= Pęcławice Górne =

- Village
- Location within Poland
- Coordinates: 50°38′44″N 21°19′38″E
- Country: Poland
- Voivodeship: Świętokrzyskie
- County: Staszów
- Gmina: Bogoria
- Sołectwo: Pęcławice Górne
- Elevation: 289.1 m (948 ft)

Population (31 December 2009 at Census)
  - Total: 108
- Time zone: UTC+1 (CET)
  - Summer (DST): UTC+2 (CEST)
- Postal code: 28–210
- Area code: +48 15
- Number plates: TSZ

Pęcławice Górne [pɛnt͡swaˈvit͡sɛ ˈɡurnɛ] is a village in Gmina Bogoria, Staszów County, Świętokrzyskie Voivodeship in south-central Poland. It is about 5 km (3 mi) east of Bogoria, 15 km (9 mi) north-east of Staszów and 57 km (35 mi) south-east of the regional capital, Kielce. In 2009, the village population had fallen to 108.

== History ==
The village, originally known as Panczlawicze (or Penczlawicze), was probably founded during the 15th century. Fiefs, granges and serfs tithed to the church in Szczeglice. According to a 1508 tax register in Sandomierz, the village belonged to John de Peczlawycze Kula. In 1578, Pęcławice Górne belonged to Dymitrowskiego Benedict and had peasant farmland and craftsmen. In the 1629 Sandomierz register, the village was known as Pęczlauice and belonged to nobleman John Podkański. Six peasants on three fiefs paid 12 złoty tax, a farmland owner paid two złoty and 18 groszy, a craftsman paid 16 groszy and six poor peasants paid 24 groszy. The village collected a total of 15 złoty and 22 groszy in tax. It belonged to Sandomierz' District III after the partitions of Poland. In 1809 Pęcławice Górne became part of the Duchy of Warsaw, and later to the Kingdom of Poland. In 1827, the village had a population of 228 in 27 houses.

Pęcławice Górne had a school, founded in 1853 and documented by rural teachers until 1939. During the January Uprising, there was an 1863 battle at Kolonia Pęcławice. In 1885 the village was part of Pęcławice with 572 fields, including arable land and gardens. Sixteen morga were meadows, 23 morga were pasture and 234 were virgin forest, with 12 buildings and 34 morga of wooded wasteland. In 1887, it joined the Sandomierz district in the Górki municipality and had 20 houses and 163 morga of fields.

Józef Piłsudski's 1st Brigade fought in the Battle of Konary from 16 to 25 May 1915. After regaining independence, Pęcławice Górne was administered by Sandomierz in the Kielce region. By the beginning of World War II, German planes had circled the village twice. Under Nazi occupation, it was controlled by the General Government. The rural area was used by conspirators, the Home Army and peasant battalions. After the war, Pęcławice Górne was again part of the Kielce district. From 1975 to 1998, it was part of the Tarnobrzeg Voivodeship.

== World War I dead ==
According to village farmer Stanislaus Witkowski, Kazimierz Jan Piątek (nicknamed "Herwin") and the other Polish Legion dead were initially buried in individual graves; Piątek's body was exhumed and reburied in Szczeglice. Lieutenant Wincenty Kwiecinski's (nicknamed "Thistle") mother had his body exhumed in July 1916, a year after his death, and he is now buried in Miechów.
