= Wysoki =

Wysoki may refer to the following places in Poland:

- Kolonia Wysoki Małe
- Wysoki Bór
- Wysoki Duże
- Wysoki Garb
- Wysoki Grad
- Wysoki Kościół
- Wysoki Małe
- Wysoki Średnie

== See also ==
- Osiedle Wysoki Stoczek, Białystok
- Wysoki Most (disambiguation)
