= Jurkowice, Staszów County =

Jurkowice
- Village
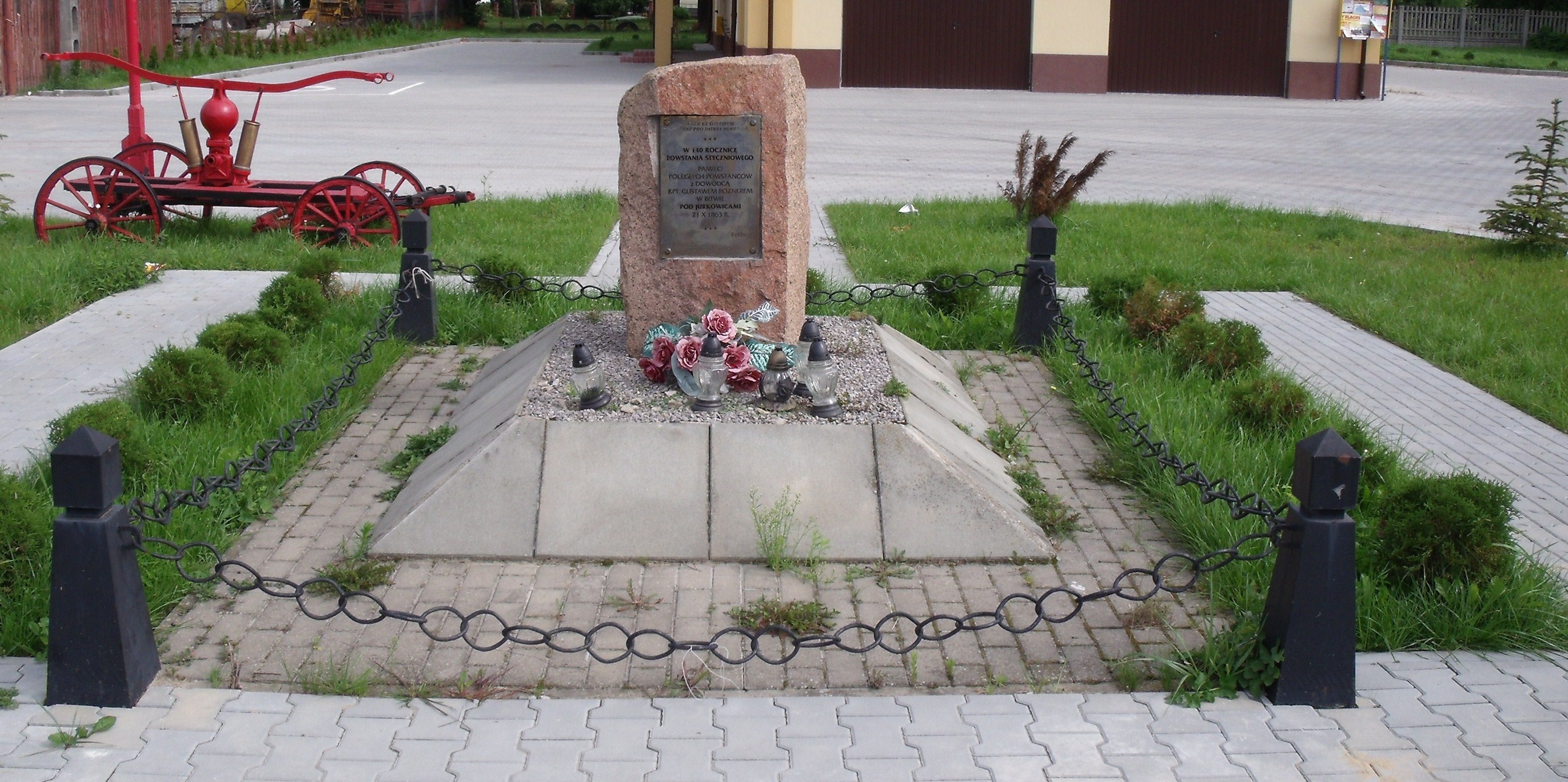

- Location within Poland
- Coordinates: 50°38′11″N 21°21′59″E
- Country: Poland
- Voivodeship: Świętokrzyskie
- County: Staszów
- Gmina: Bogoria
- Sołectwo: Jurkowice
- Elevation: 296 m (971 ft)

Population (31 December 2009 at Census)
  - Total: ▲535
- Time zone: UTC+1 (CET)
  - Summer (DST): UTC+2 (CEST)
- Postal code: 28–210
- Area code: +48 15
- Car plates: TSZ

Jurkowice [jurkɔˈvit͡sɛ] is a village in the administrative district of Gmina Bogoria, within Staszów County, Świętokrzyskie Voivodeship, in south-central Poland. It lies approximately 8 km (5 mi) east of Bogoria, 17 km (11 mi) north-east of Staszów, and 60 km (37 mi) south-east of the regional capital Kielce.
