= Kiełczyna =

- Village
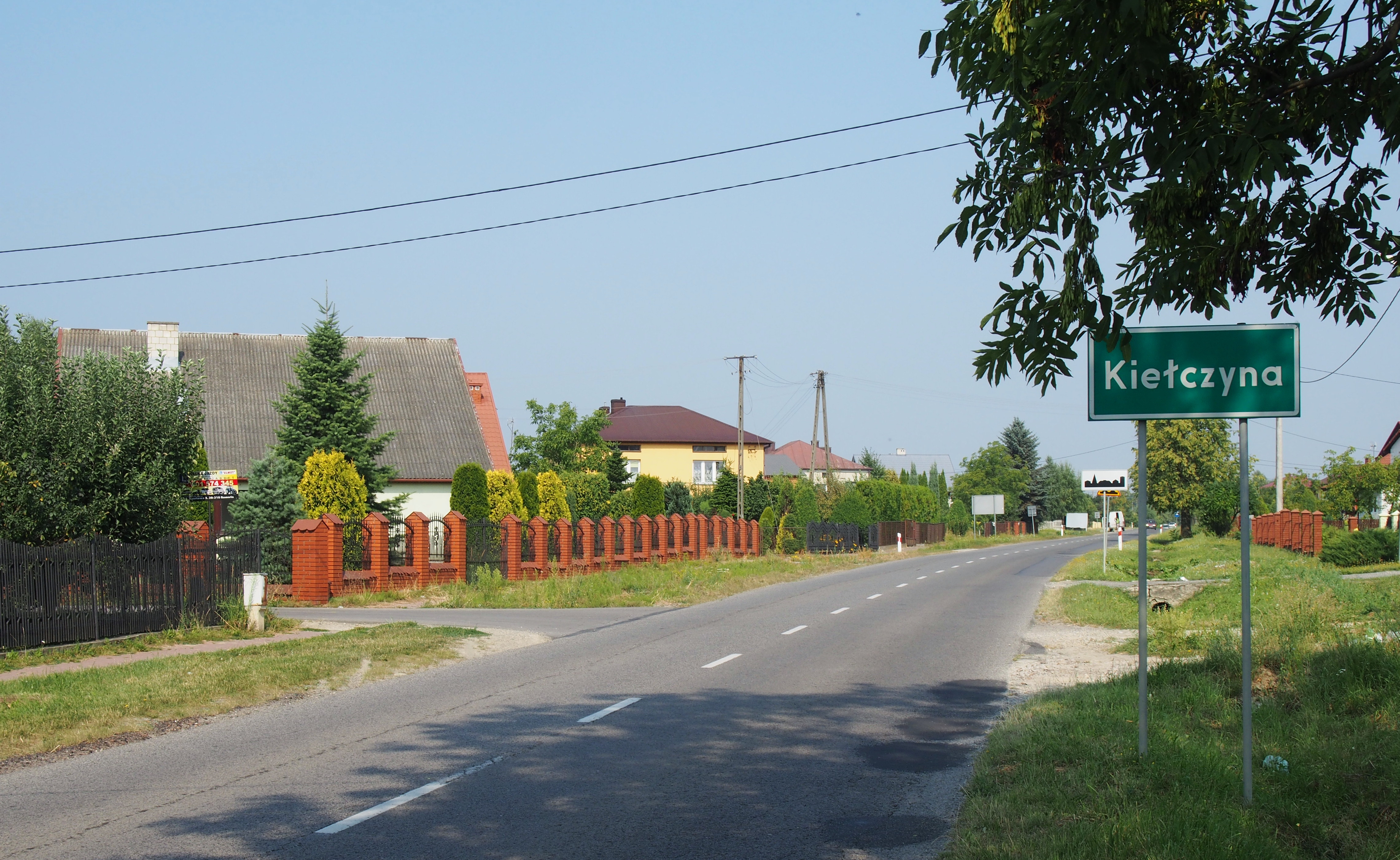

- Location within Poland
- Coordinates: 50°40′00″N 21°14′43″E
- Country: Poland
- Voivodeship: Świętokrzyskie
- County: Staszów
- Gmina: Bogoria
- Sołectwo: Kiełczyna
- Elevation: 303.1 m (994 ft)

Population (31 December 2009 at Census)
  - Total: ▲435
- Time zone: UTC+1 (CET)
  - Summer (DST): UTC+2 (CEST)
- Postal code: 28–210
- Area code: +48 15
- Car plates: TSZ

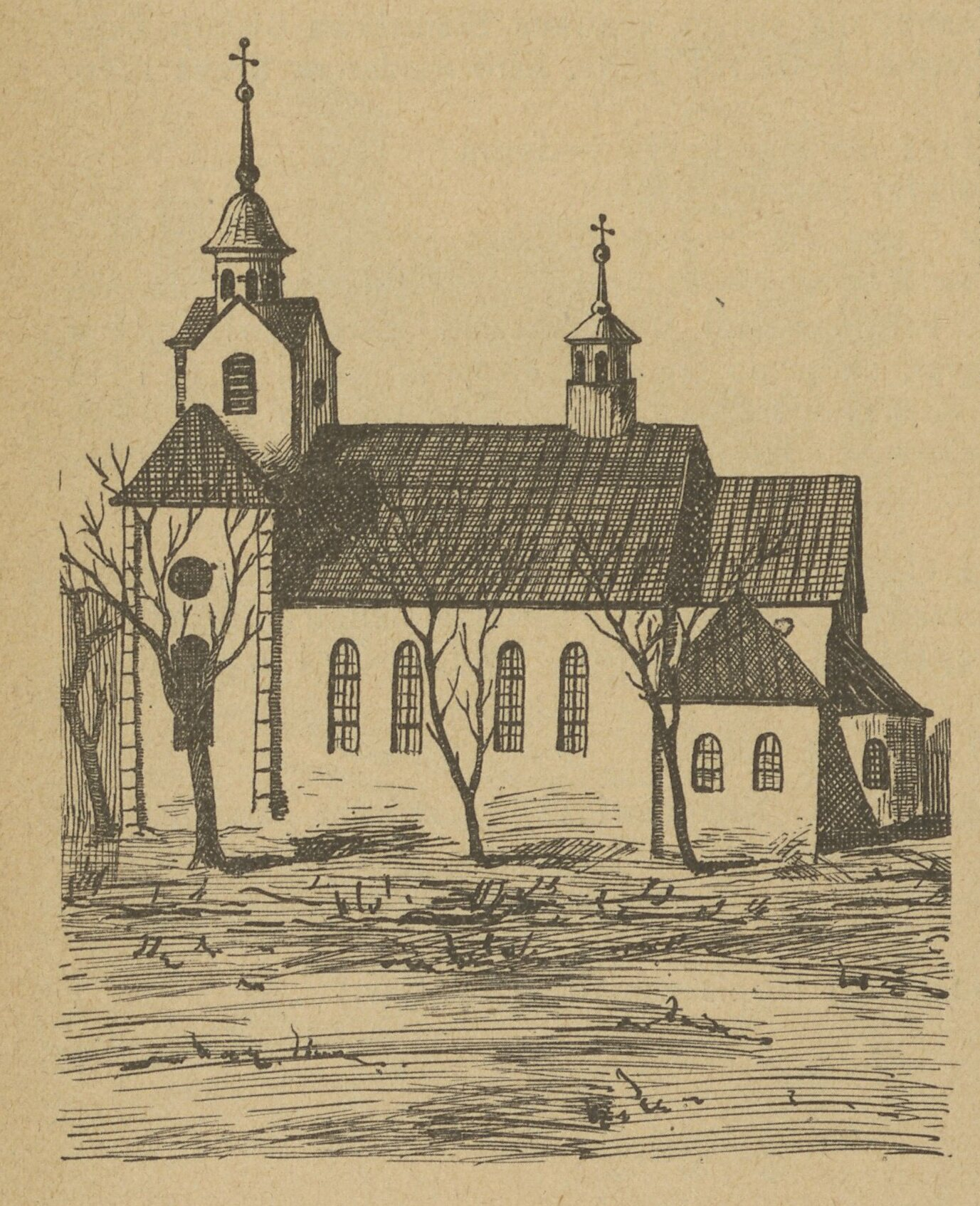
Saint Nicholas church before 1907

Kiełczyna [kʲɛu̯ˈt͡ʂɨna] is a village in the administrative district of Gmina Bogoria, within Staszów County, Świętokrzyskie Voivodeship, in south-central Poland. It lies approximately 2 km (1 mi) north of Bogoria, 14 km (9 mi) north-east of Staszów, and 52 km (32 mi) south-east of the regional capital Kielce.
