= Zagorzyce, Świętokrzyskie Voivodeship =

Zagorzyce
- Village
- Location within Poland
- Coordinates: 50°39′51″N 21°19′19″E
- Country: Poland
- Voivodeship: Świętokrzyskie
- County: Staszów
- Gmina: Bogoria
- Sołectwo: Zagorzyce

Government
  - Mayor village: Władysław Marcin Brudek (KWW GzP)
  - Village Council: Members' List: • Maciej Tutak (KW PO RP) — Council President; • Wiesława Zakrzewska (KW PSL) — Vice-President of Council; • Zdzisław Roman Trybuszkiewicz (KWW "UŻ") — Vice-President of Council; • Wiesław Paweł Barabasz (KWW GzP) — Commission Vice-Chair; • Władysław Jaworski (KWW ZMnN) — Commission Vice-Chair; • Bogdan Andrzej Lech (KWW ZMnN); • Edmund Maciąg (KWW GzP) — Commission Vice-Chair; • Zygmunt Madej (KWW ZMnN); • Stanisław Marzec (KWW GzP); • Andrzej Mucha (KW PSL) — Commission Chair; • Andrzej Pańczyk (KWW ZMnN); • Jolanta Teresa Piotrowska (KWW GzP) — Commission Chair; • Mieczysław Sztaba (KWW PiR-B); • Andrzej Jan Wołowski (KWW N"N"); • Jolanta Wyrzykowska (KWW GzP) — Commission Chair
  - Chief village: Monika Urbańska
- Elevation: 276.1 m (906 ft)

Population (31 December 2009 at Census)
  - Total: ▲394
- Time zone: UTC+1 (CET)
  - Summer (DST): UTC+2 (CEST)
- Postal code: 28-210
- Area code: +48 15
- Car plates: TSZ

Zagorzyce [zaɡɔˈʐɨt͡sɛ] is a village in the administrative district of Gmina Bogoria, within Staszów County, Świętokrzyskie Voivodeship, in south-central Poland. It lies approximately 5 km (3 mi) east of Bogoria, 16 km (10 mi) north-east of Staszów, and 56 km (35 mi) south-east of the regional capital Kielce.
