= Budy, Staszów County =

Budy
- Village
- Location within Poland
- Coordinates: 50°37′22″N 21°21′17″E
- Country: Poland
- Voivodeship: Świętokrzyskie
- County: Staszów
- Gmina: Bogoria
- Sołectwo: Budy
- Elevation: 247 m (810 ft)

Population (31 December 2009 at Census)
  - Total: ▲199
- Time zone: UTC+1 (CET)
  - Summer (DST): UTC+2 (CEST)
- Postal code: 28–210
- Area code: +48 15
- Car plates: TSZ

Budy [ˈbudɨ] is a village in the administrative district of Gmina Bogoria, within Staszów County, Świętokrzyskie Voivodeship, in south-central Poland. It lies approximately 8 km (5 mi) south-east of Bogoria, 15 km (9 mi) north-east of Staszów, and 60 km (37 mi) south-east of the regional capital Kielce.
