= Wolica, Gmina Bogoria =

Wolica
- Village
- Location within Poland
- Coordinates: 50°39′10″N 21°19′40″E
- Country: Poland
- Voivodeship: Świętokrzyskie
- County: Staszów
- Gmina: Bogoria
- Sołectwo: Wolica
- Elevation: 280.1 m (919 ft)

Population (31 December 2009 at Census)
  - Total: ▲58
- Time zone: UTC+1 (CET)
  - Summer (DST): UTC+2 (CEST)
- Postal code: 28-210
- Area code: +48 15
- Car plates: TSZ

Wolica [vɔˈlit͡sa] is a village in the administrative district of Gmina Bogoria, within Staszów County, Świętokrzyskie Voivodeship, in south-central Poland. It lies approximately 5 km (3 mi) east of Bogoria, 16 km (10 mi) north-east of Staszów, and 56 km (35 mi) south-east of the regional capital Kielce.
