= Wola Kiełczyńska =

- Village
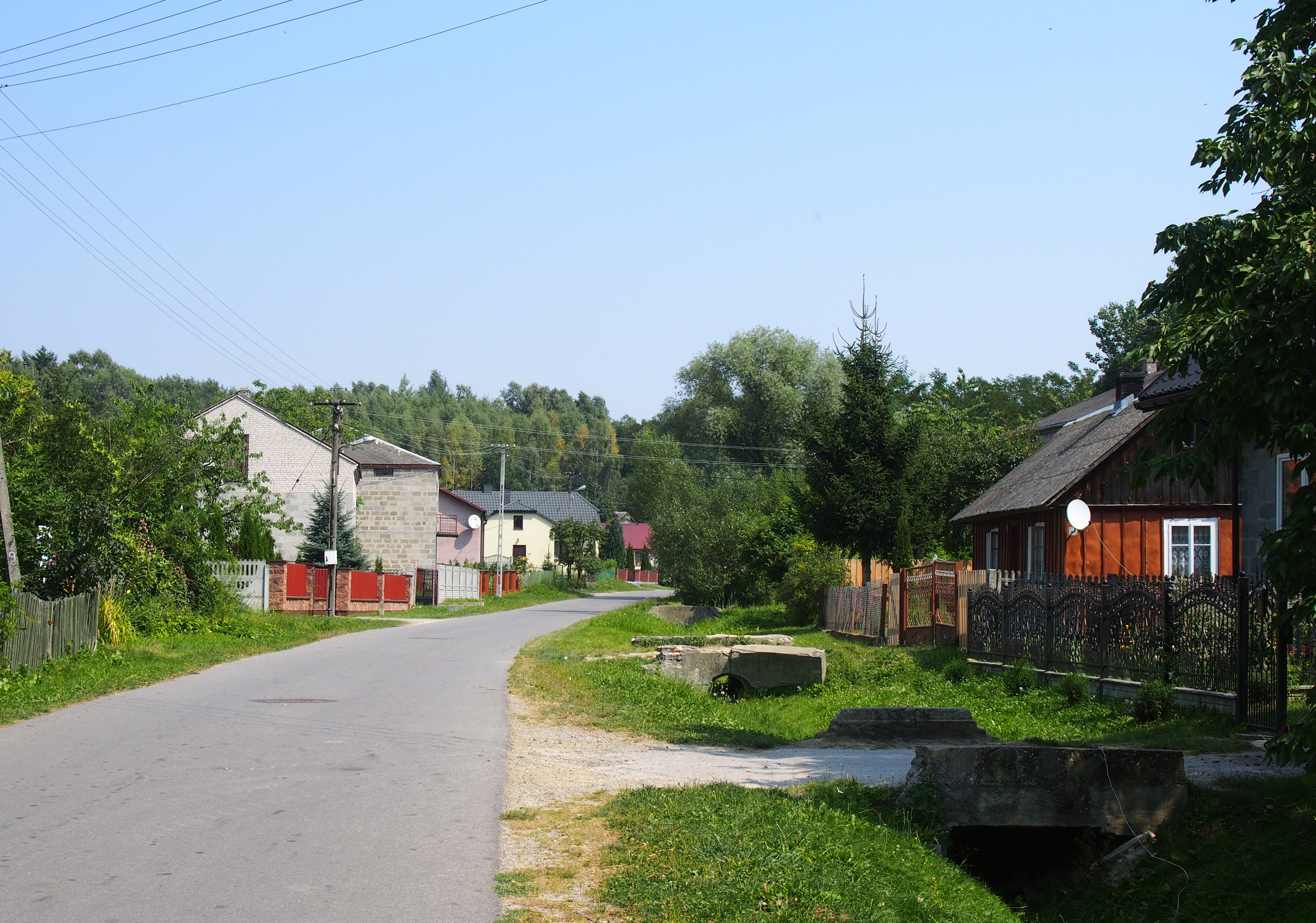

- Location within Poland
- Coordinates: 50°39′48″N 21°14′05″E
- Country: Poland
- Voivodeship: Świętokrzyskie
- County: Staszów
- Gmina: Bogoria
- Sołectwo: Wola Kiełczyńska
- Elevation: 277.4 m (910 ft)

Population (31 December 2009 at Census)
  - Total: ▲169
- Time zone: UTC+1 (CET)
  - Summer (DST): UTC+2 (CEST)
- Postal code: 28-210
- Area code: +48 15
- Car plates: TSZ

Wola Kiełczyńska [ˈvɔla kʲɛu̯ˈt͡ʂɨɲska] is a village in the administrative district of Gmina Bogoria, within Staszów County, Świętokrzyskie Voivodeship, in south-central Poland. It lies approximately 3 km (2 mi) north-west of Bogoria, 13 km (8 mi) north-east of Staszów, and 50 km (31 mi) south-east of the regional capital Kielce.
