= Ujazdek =

- Village
- Location within Poland
- Coordinates: 50°41′40″N 21°11′29″E
- Country: Poland
- Voivodeship: Świętokrzyskie
- County: Staszów
- Gmina: Bogoria
- Sołectwo: Ujazdek
- Elevation: 309.9 m (1,017 ft)

Population (31 December 2009 at Census)
  - Total: ▼90
- Time zone: UTC+1 (CET)
  - Summer (DST): UTC+2 (CEST)
- Postal code: 28-210
- Area code: +48 15
- Car plates: TSZ

Ujazdek [uˈjazdɛk] is a village in the administrative district of Gmina Bogoria, within Staszów County, Świętokrzyskie Voivodeship, in south-central Poland. It lies approximately 7 km (4 mi) north-west of Bogoria, 15 km (9 mi) north of Staszów, and 46 km (29 mi) south-east of the regional capital Kielce.
