= Niedźwiedź, Staszów County =

Niedźwiedź
- Village
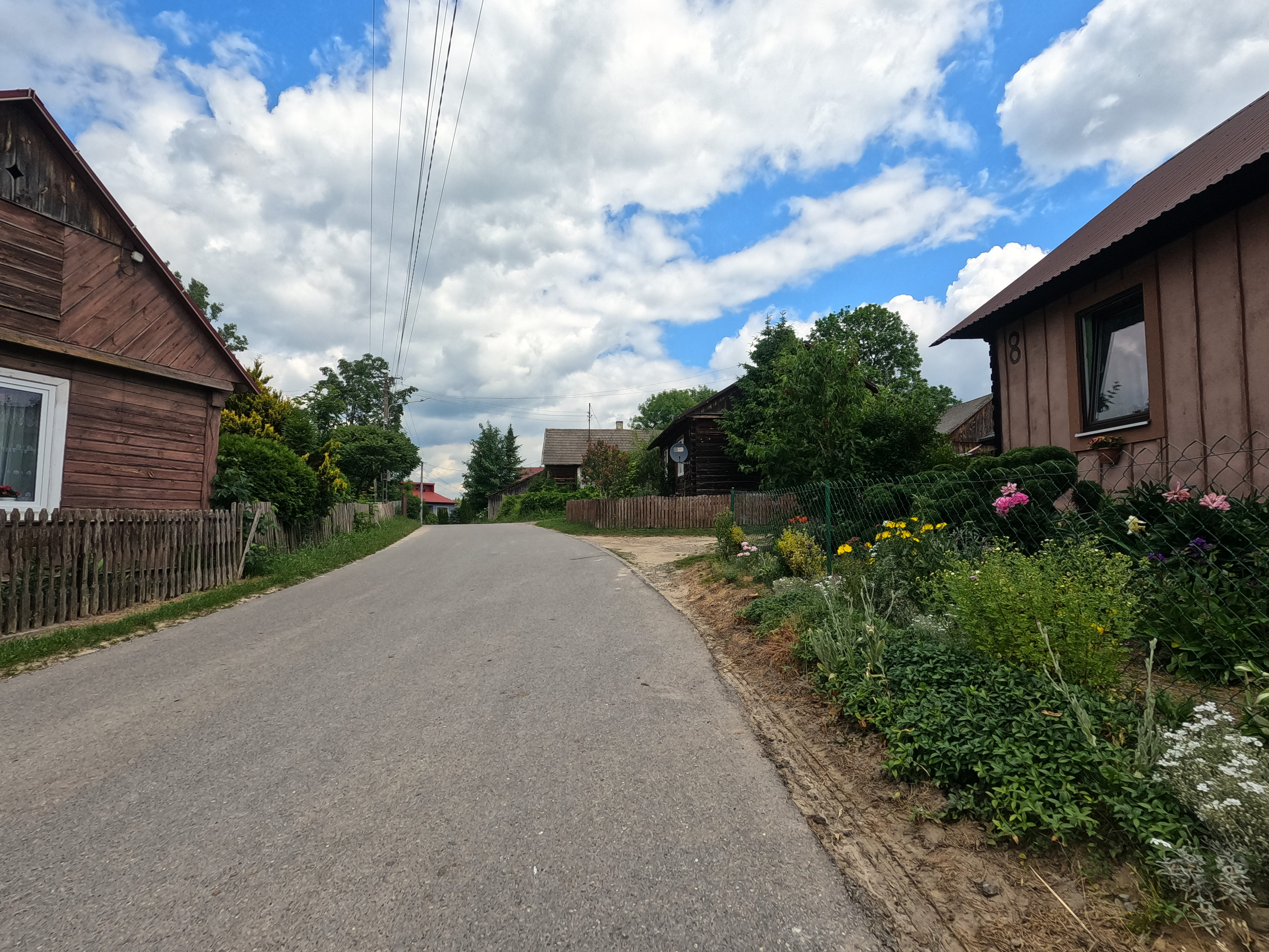

- Location within Poland
- Coordinates: 50°40′46″N 21°09′26″E
- Country: Poland
- Voivodeship: Świętokrzyskie
- County: Staszów
- Gmina: Bogoria
- Sołectwo: Niedźwiedź
- Elevation: 266.3 m (874 ft)

Population (31 December 2009 at Census)
  - Total: ▼200
- Time zone: UTC+1 (CET)
  - Summer (DST): UTC+2 (CEST)
- Postal code: 28–210
- Area code: +48 15
- Car plates: TSZ

Niedźwiedź [ˈɲɛd͡ʑvjɛt͡ɕ] is a village in the administrative district of Gmina Bogoria, within Staszów County, Świętokrzyskie Voivodeship, in south-central Poland. It lies approximately 8 km (5 mi) north-west of Bogoria, 14 km (9 mi) north of Staszów, and 45 km (28 mi) south-east of the regional capital Kielce.
