= Łagówka =

- Village
- Location within Poland
- Coordinates: 50°41′54″N 21°09′34″E
- Country: Poland
- Voivodeship: Świętokrzyskie
- County: Staszów
- Gmina: Bogoria
- Sołectwo: Łagówka
- Elevation: 280.5 m (920 ft)

Population (31 December 2009 at Census)
  - Total: ▼53
- Time zone: UTC+1 (CET)
  - Summer (DST): UTC+2 (CEST)
- Postal code: 28–210
- Area code: +48 15
- Car plates: TSZ

Łagówka [waˈɡufka] is a village in the administrative district of Gmina Bogoria, within Staszów County, Świętokrzyskie Voivodeship, in south-central Poland. It lies approximately 9 km (6 mi) northwest of Bogoria, 16 km (10 mi) north of Staszów, and 44 km (27 mi) south-east of the regional capital Kielce.
