= Malkowice, Świętokrzyskie Voivodeship =

Malkowice
- Village
- Location within Poland
- Coordinates: 50°40′33″N 21°11′35″E
- Country: Poland
- Voivodeship: Świętokrzyskie
- County: Staszów
- Gmina: Bogoria
- Sołectwo: Malkowice
- Elevation: 279.9 m (918 ft)

Population (31 December 2009 at Census)
  - Total: ▼144
- Time zone: UTC+1 (CET)
  - Summer (DST): UTC+2 (CEST)
- Postal code: 28-210
- Area code: +48 15
- Car plates: TSZ

Malkowice [malkɔˈvit͡sɛ] (till December 31, 2000 the official name of locality did not exist in Polish law) is a village in the administrative district of Gmina Bogoria, within Staszów County, Świętokrzyskie Voivodeship, in south-central Poland. It lies approximately 5 km (3 mi) north-west of Bogoria, 13 km (8 mi) north of Staszów, and 48 km (30 mi) south-east of the regional capital Kielce.
