= Józefów Witowicki =

- Colony
- Location within Poland
- Coordinates: 50°38′01″N 21°20′26″E
- Country: Poland
- Voivodeship: Świętokrzyskie
- County: Staszów
- Gmina: Bogoria
- Sołectwo: Józefów Witowicki
- Elevation: 250.2 m (821 ft)

Population (31 December 2009 at Census)
  - Total: ▼129
- Time zone: UTC+1 (CET)
  - Summer (DST): UTC+2 (CEST)
- Postal code: 28–210
- Area code: +48 15
- Car plates: TSZ

Józefów Witowicki (Polish pronunciation: [juˈzɛfuv vitɔˈvit͡skʲi]) is a colony in the administrative district of Gmina Bogoria, within Staszów County, Świętokrzyskie Voivodeship, in south-central Poland. It lies approximately 7 km (4 mi) east of Bogoria, 15 km (9 mi) north-east of Staszów, and 59 km (37 mi) south-east of the regional capital Kielce.
