= Moszyny =

- Village
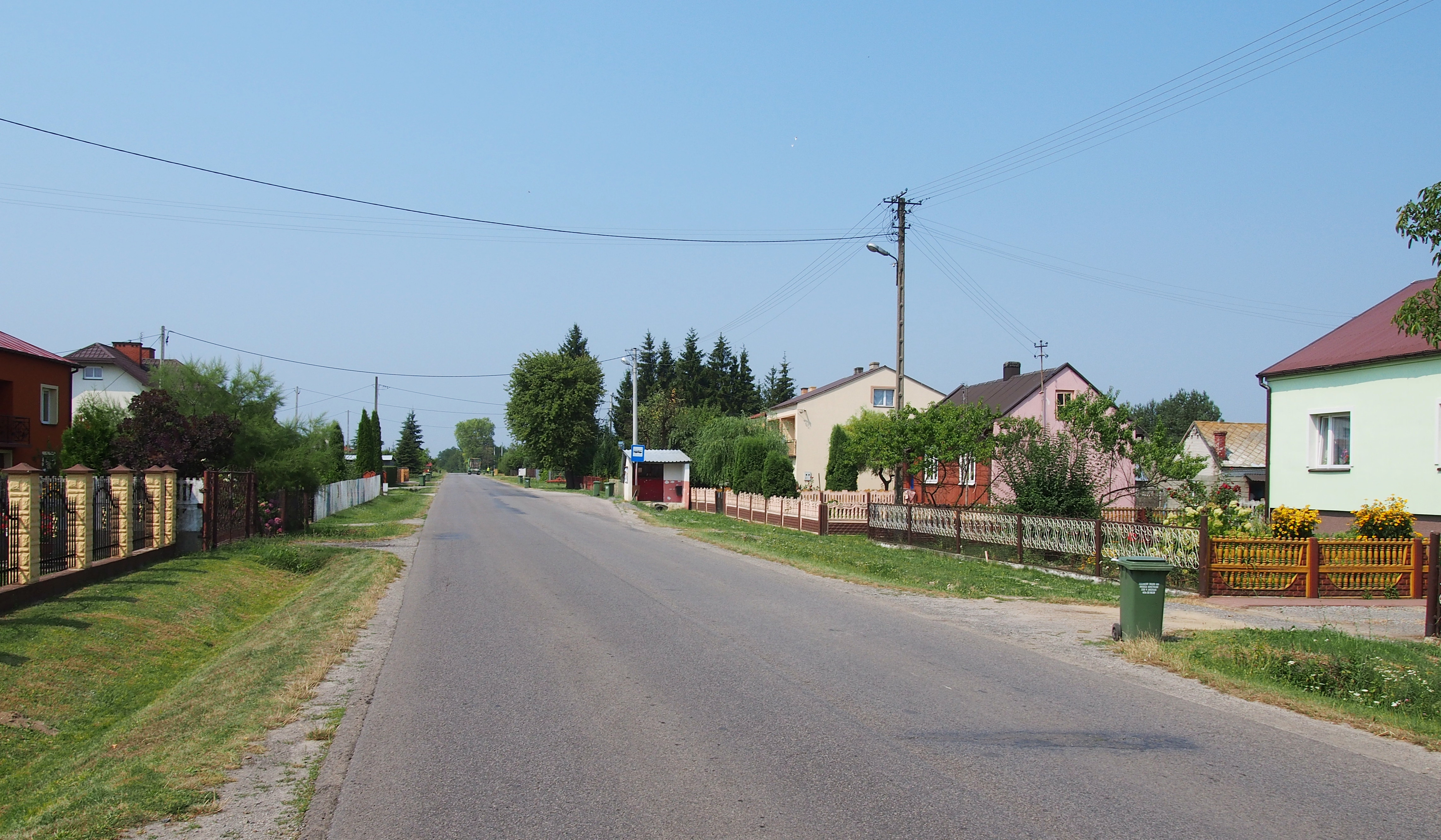

- Location within Poland
- Coordinates: 50°38′40″N 21°17′09″E
- Country: Poland
- Voivodeship: Świętokrzyskie
- County: Staszów
- Gmina: Bogoria
- Sołectwo: Moszyny
- Elevation: 262.8 m (862 ft)

Population (31 December 2009 at Census)
  - Total: ▲349
- Time zone: UTC+1 (CET)
  - Summer (DST): UTC+2 (CEST)
- Postal code: 28–210
- Area code: +48 15
- Car plates: TSZ

Moszyny [mɔˈʂɨnɨ] is a village in the administrative district of Gmina Bogoria, within Staszów County, Świętokrzyskie Voivodeship, in south-central Poland. It lies approximately 2 km (1 mi) east of Bogoria, 13 km (8 mi) north-east of Staszów, and 54 km (34 mi) south-east of the regional capital Kielce.
