= Domaradzice, Świętokrzyskie Voivodeship =

Domaradzice
- Village
- Location within Poland
- Coordinates: 50°39′55″N 21°20′46″E
- Country: Poland
- Voivodeship: Świętokrzyskie
- County: Staszów
- Gmina: Bogoria
- Sołectwo: Domaradzice
- Elevation: 269.3 m (884 ft)

Population (31 December 2009 at Census)
  - Total: ▲222
- Time zone: UTC+1 (CET)
  - Summer (DST): UTC+2 (CEST)
- Postal code: 28–210
- Area code: +48 15
- Car plates: TSZ

Domaradzice [dɔmaraˈd͡ʑit͡sɛ] is a village in the administrative district of Gmina Bogoria, within Staszów County, Świętokrzyskie Voivodeship, in south-central Poland. It lies approximately 7 km (4 mi) east of Bogoria, 18 km (11 mi) north-east of Staszów, and 57 km (35 mi) south-east of the regional capital Kielce.
