= Gorzków, Staszów County =

Gorzków
- Village
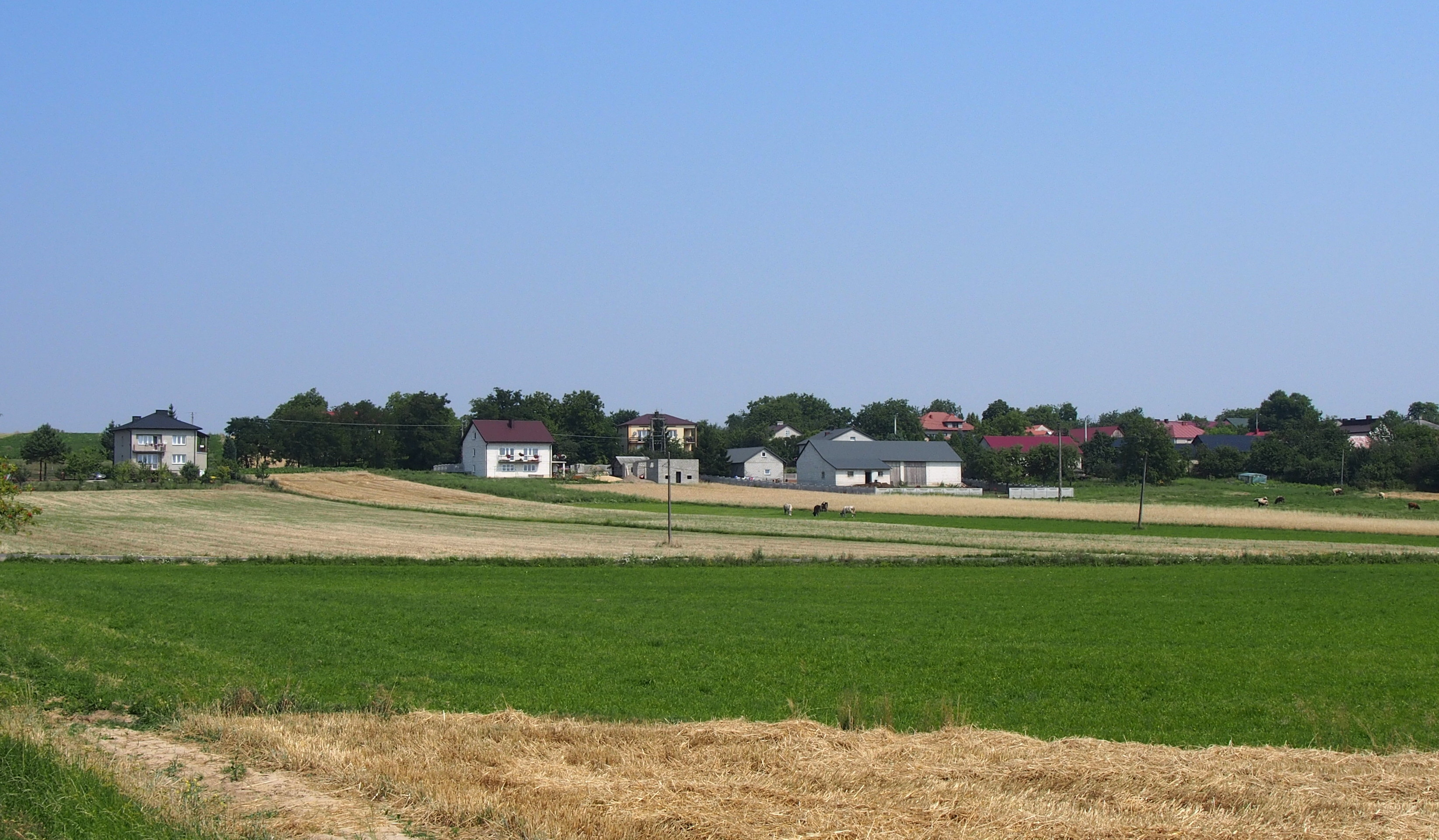

- Location within Poland
- Coordinates: 50°41′14″N 21°14′42″E
- Country: Poland
- Voivodeship: Świętokrzyskie
- County: Staszów
- Gmina: Bogoria
- Sołectwo: Gorzków
- Elevation: 339.5 m (1,114 ft)

Population (31 December 2009 at Census)
  - Total: ▼212
- Time zone: UTC+1 (CET)
  - Summer (DST): UTC+2 (CEST)
- Postal code: 28–210
- Area code: +48 15
- Car plates: TSZ

Gorzków [ˈɡɔʂkuf] is a village in the administrative district of Gmina Bogoria, within Staszów County, Świętokrzyskie Voivodeship, in south-central Poland. It lies approximately 5 km (3 mi) north of Bogoria, 16 km (10 mi) north of Staszów, and 50 km (31 mi) south-east of the regional capital Kielce.
