= Grzybów, Gmina Bogoria =

Grzybów
- Village
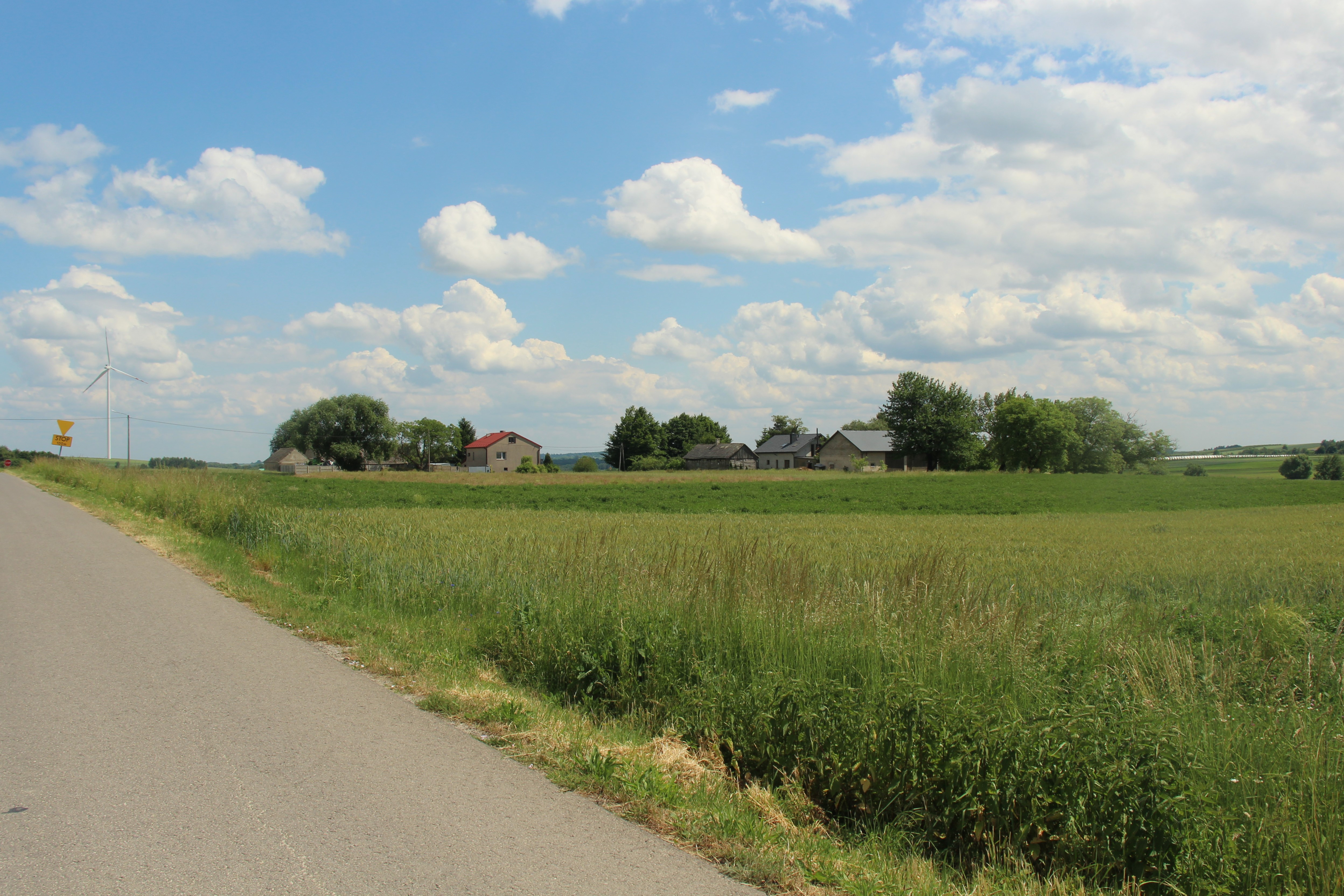

- Location within Poland
- Coordinates: 50°40′36″N 21°17′23″E
- Country: Poland
- Voivodeship: Świętokrzyskie
- County: Staszów
- Gmina: Bogoria
- Sołectwo: Grzybów
- Elevation: 318.5 m (1,045 ft)

Population (31 December 2009 at Census)
  - Total: ▼277
- Time zone: UTC+1 (CET)
  - Summer (DST): UTC+2 (CEST)
- Postal code: 28–210
- Area code: +48 15
- Car plates: TSZ

Grzybów [ˈɡʐɨbuf] is a village in the administrative district of Gmina Bogoria, within Staszów County, Świętokrzyskie Voivodeship, in south-central Poland. It lies approximately 4 km (2 mi) north-east of Bogoria, 16 km (10 mi) north-east of Staszów, and 53 km (33 mi) south-east of the regional capital Kielce.
