= Przyborowice, Świętokrzyskie Voivodeship =

Przyborowice
- Village
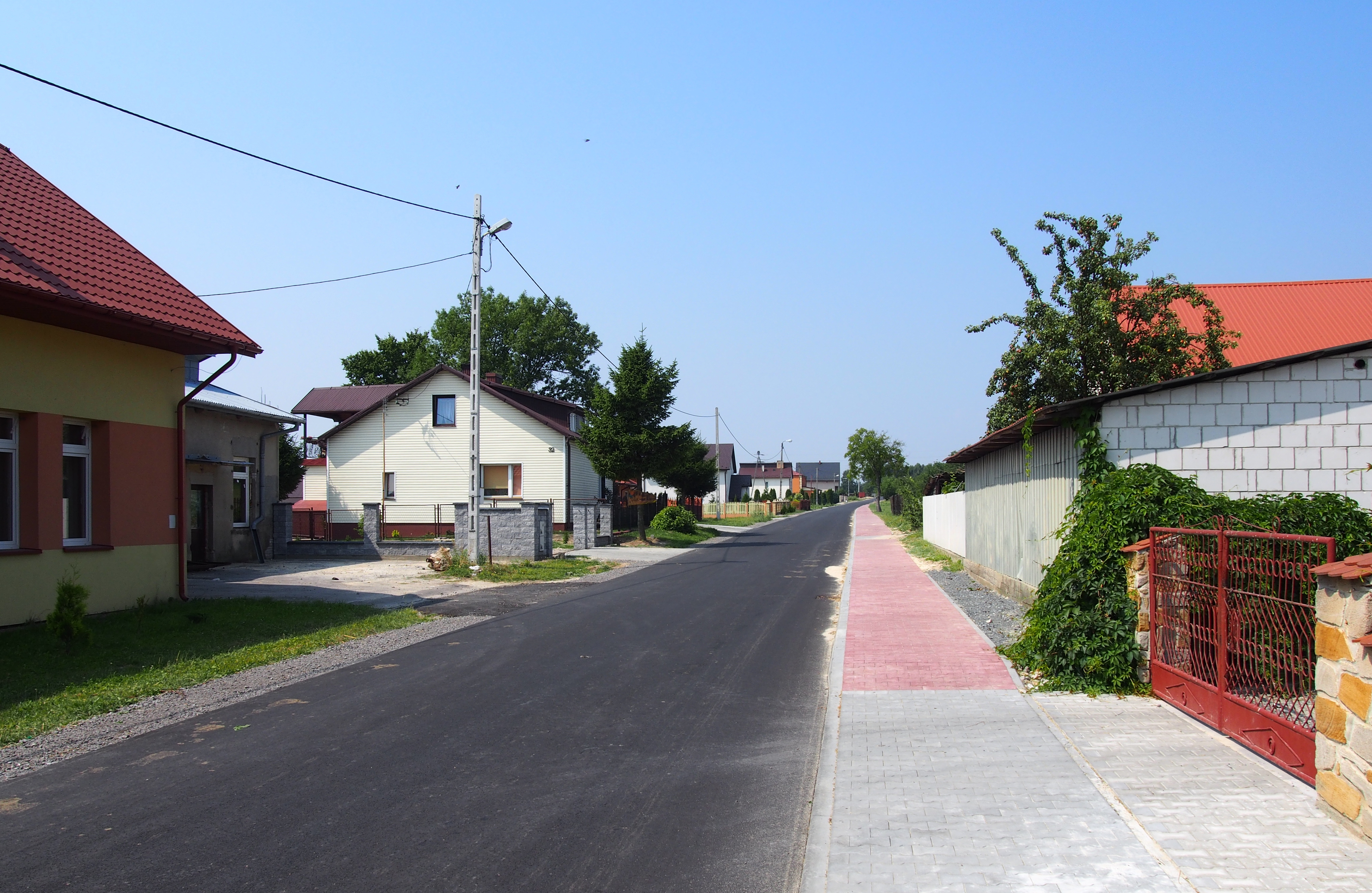

- Location within Poland
- Coordinates: 50°40′31″N 21°14′28″E
- Country: Poland
- Voivodeship: Świętokrzyskie
- County: Staszów
- Gmina: Bogoria
- Sołectwo: Przyborowice
- Elevation: 310.9 m (1,020 ft)

Population (31 December 2009 at Census)
  - Total: ▼260
- Time zone: UTC+1 (CET)
  - Summer (DST): UTC+2 (CEST)
- Postal code: 28-210
- Area code: +48 15
- Car plates: TSZ

Przyborowice [pʂɨbɔrɔˈvit͡sɛ] is a village in the administrative district of Gmina Bogoria, within Staszów County, Świętokrzyskie Voivodeship, in south-central Poland. It lies approximately 3 km (2 mi) north-west of Bogoria, 14 km (9 mi) north-east of Staszów, and 50 km (31 mi) south-east of the regional capital Kielce.
