= Kolonia Pęcławska =

- Village
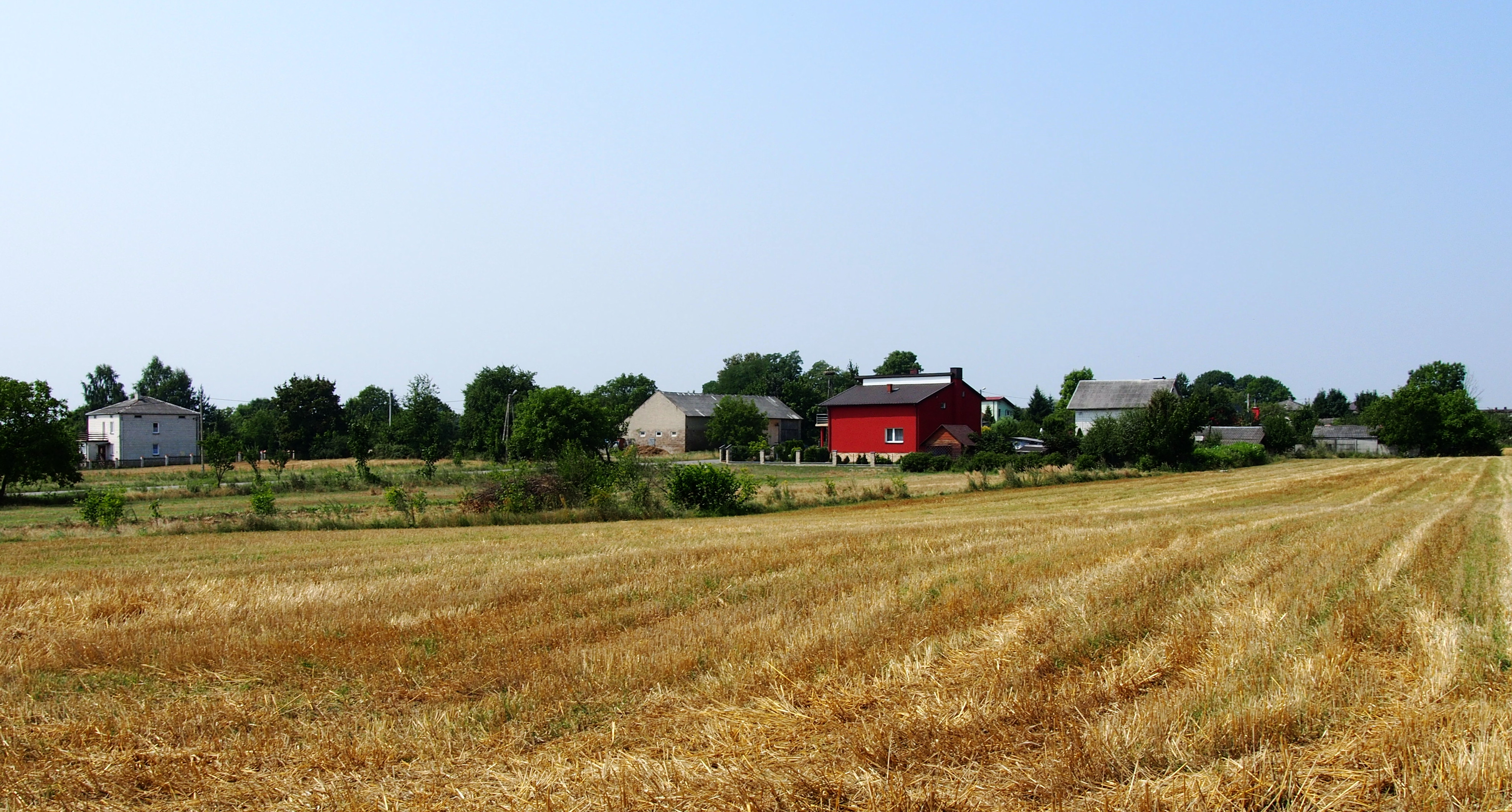

- Location within Poland
- Coordinates: 50°38′13″N 21°19′43″E
- Country: Poland
- Voivodeship: Świętokrzyskie
- County: Staszów
- Gmina: Bogoria
- Sołectwo: Kolonia Pęcławska
- Elevation: 251.4 m (825 ft)

Population (31 December 2009 at Census)
  - Total: ▼137
- Time zone: UTC+1 (CET)
  - Summer (DST): UTC+2 (CEST)
- Postal code: 28–210
- Area code: +48 15
- Car plates: TSZ

Kolonia Pęcławska [kɔˈlɔɲa pɛnt͡sˈwafska] is a village in the administrative district of Gmina Bogoria, within Staszów County, Świętokrzyskie Voivodeship, in south-central Poland. It lies approximately 6 km (4 mi) east of Bogoria, 15 km (9 mi) north-east of Staszów, and 57 km (35 mi) south-east of the regional capital Kielce.
