= Kolonia Bogoria =

- Village
- Location within Poland
- Coordinates: 50°37′25″N 21°13′25″E
- Country: Poland
- Voivodeship: Świętokrzyskie
- County: Staszów
- Gmina: Bogoria
- Sołectwo: Kolonia Bogoria
- Elevation: 243 m (797 ft)

Population (31 December 2009 at Census)
  - Total: ▲257
- Time zone: UTC+1 (CET)
  - Summer (DST): UTC+2 (CEST)
- Postal code: 28–210
- Area code: +48 15
- Car plates: TSZ

Kolonia Bogoria [kɔˈlɔɲa bɔˈɡɔrja] (till 31 December 2000 as at Bogoria Kolonia and till 31 December 2005 with type of settlement as of colony independent) is a village in the administrative district of Gmina Bogoria, within Staszów County, Świętokrzyskie Voivodeship, in south-central Poland. It lies approximately 4 km (2 mi) south-west of Bogoria, 9 km (6 mi) north-east of Staszów, and 52 km (32 mi) south-east of the regional capital Kielce.
