= Pełczyce, Świętokrzyskie Voivodeship =

Pełczyce
- Village
- Location within Poland
- Coordinates: 50°38′47″N 21°22′42″E
- Country: Poland
- Voivodeship: Świętokrzyskie
- County: Staszów
- Gmina: Bogoria
- Sołectwo: Pełczyce
- Elevation: 254.1 m (834 ft)

Population (31 December 2009 at Census)
  - Total: ▲384
- Time zone: UTC+1 (CET)
  - Summer (DST): UTC+2 (CEST)
- Postal code: 28–210
- Area code: +48 15
- Car plates: TSZ

Pełczyce [pɛu̯ˈt͡ʂɨt͡sɛ] is a village in the administrative district of Gmina Bogoria, within Staszów County, Świętokrzyskie Voivodeship, in south-central Poland. It lies approximately 9 km (6 mi) east of Bogoria, 18 km (11 mi) north-east of Staszów, and 60 km (37 mi) south-east of the regional capital Kielce.
