= Zimnowoda, Świętokrzyskie Voivodeship =

Zimnowoda
- Village
- Location within Poland
- Coordinates: 50°37′50″N 21°14′24″E
- Country: Poland
- Voivodeship: Świętokrzyskie
- County: Staszów
- Gmina: Bogoria
- Sołectwo: Zimnowoda
- Elevation: 236.5 m (776 ft)

Population (31 December 2009 at Census)
  - Total: ▲236
- Time zone: UTC+1 (CET)
  - Summer (DST): UTC+2 (CEST)
- Postal code: 28-210
- Area code: +48 15
- Car plates: TSZ

Zimnowoda [ʑimnɔˈvɔda] is a village in the administrative district of Gmina Bogoria, within Staszów County, Świętokrzyskie Voivodeship, in south-central Poland. It lies approximately 3 km (2 mi) southwest of Bogoria, 10 km (6 mi) northeast of Staszów, and 52 km (32 mi) south-east of the regional capital Kielce.
