= Pęcławice (disambiguation) =

Pęcławice may refer to the following places in Poland:

- Pęcławice
- Kolonia Pęcławice
- Pęcławice Górne
