= Ceber, Świętokrzyskie Voivodeship =

Ceber
- Village
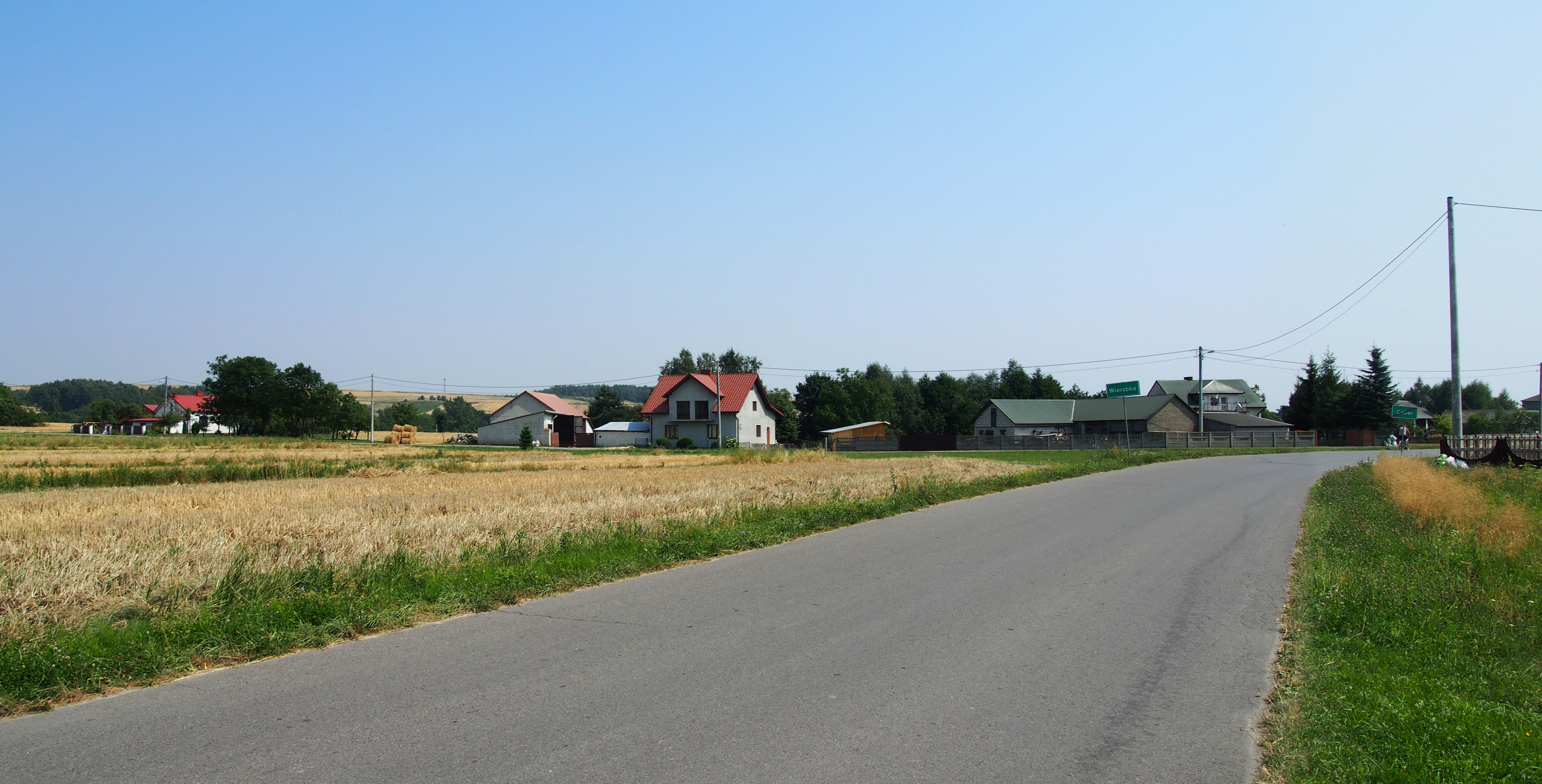

- Location within Poland
- Coordinates: 50°41′07″N 21°13′21″E
- Country: Poland
- Voivodeship: Świętokrzyskie
- County: Staszów
- Gmina: Bogoria
- Sołectwo: Ceber
- Elevation: 307.6 m (1,009 ft)

Population (31 December 2009 at Census)
  - Total: ▼188
- Time zone: UTC+1 (CET)
  - Summer (DST): UTC+2 (CEST)
- Postal code: 28–210
- Area code: +48 15
- Car plates: TSZ

Ceber [ˈt͡sɛbɛr] is a village in the administrative district of Gmina Bogoria, within Staszów County, Świętokrzyskie Voivodeship, in south-central Poland. It lies approximately 5 km (3 mi) north-west of Bogoria, 15 km (9 mi) north of Staszów, and 48 km (30 mi) south-east of the regional capital Kielce.
