= Wola Malkowska =

- Village
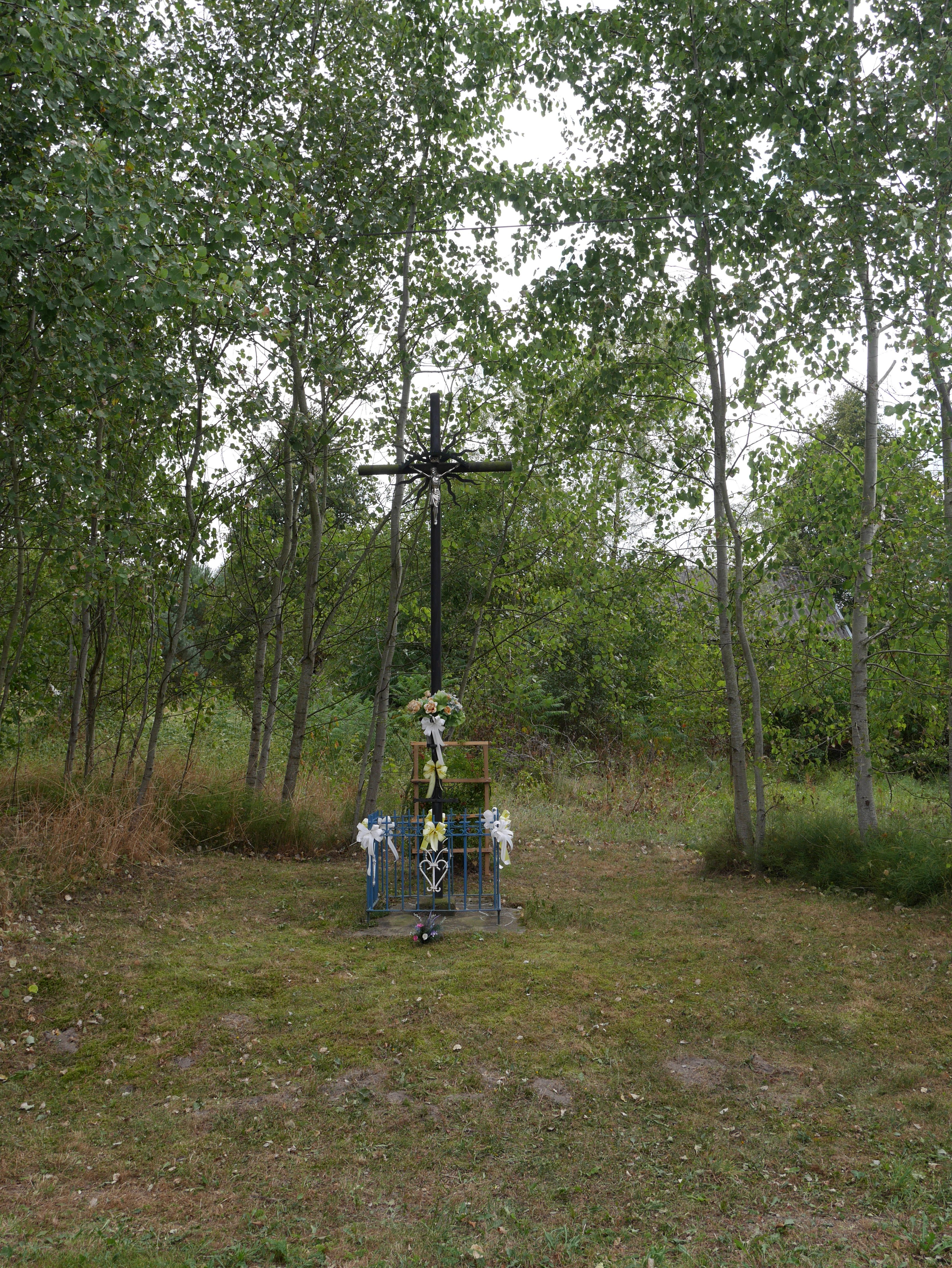

- Location within Poland
- Coordinates: 50°39′38″N 21°11′53″E
- Country: Poland
- Voivodeship: Świętokrzyskie
- County: Staszów
- Gmina: Bogoria
- Sołectwo: Wola Malkowska
- Elevation: 247.2 m (811 ft)

Population (31 December 2009 at Census)
  - Total: ▼224
- Time zone: UTC+1 (CET)
  - Summer (DST): UTC+2 (CEST)
- Postal code: 28-210
- Area code: +48 15
- Car plates: TSZ

Wola Malkowska [ˈvɔla malˈkɔfska] is a village in the administrative district of Gmina Bogoria, within Staszów County, Świętokrzyskie Voivodeship, in south-central Poland. It lies approximately 5 km (3 mi) west of Bogoria, 12 km (7 mi) north of Staszów, and 48 km (30 mi) south-east of the regional capital Kielce.
