= Szczeglice =

- Village
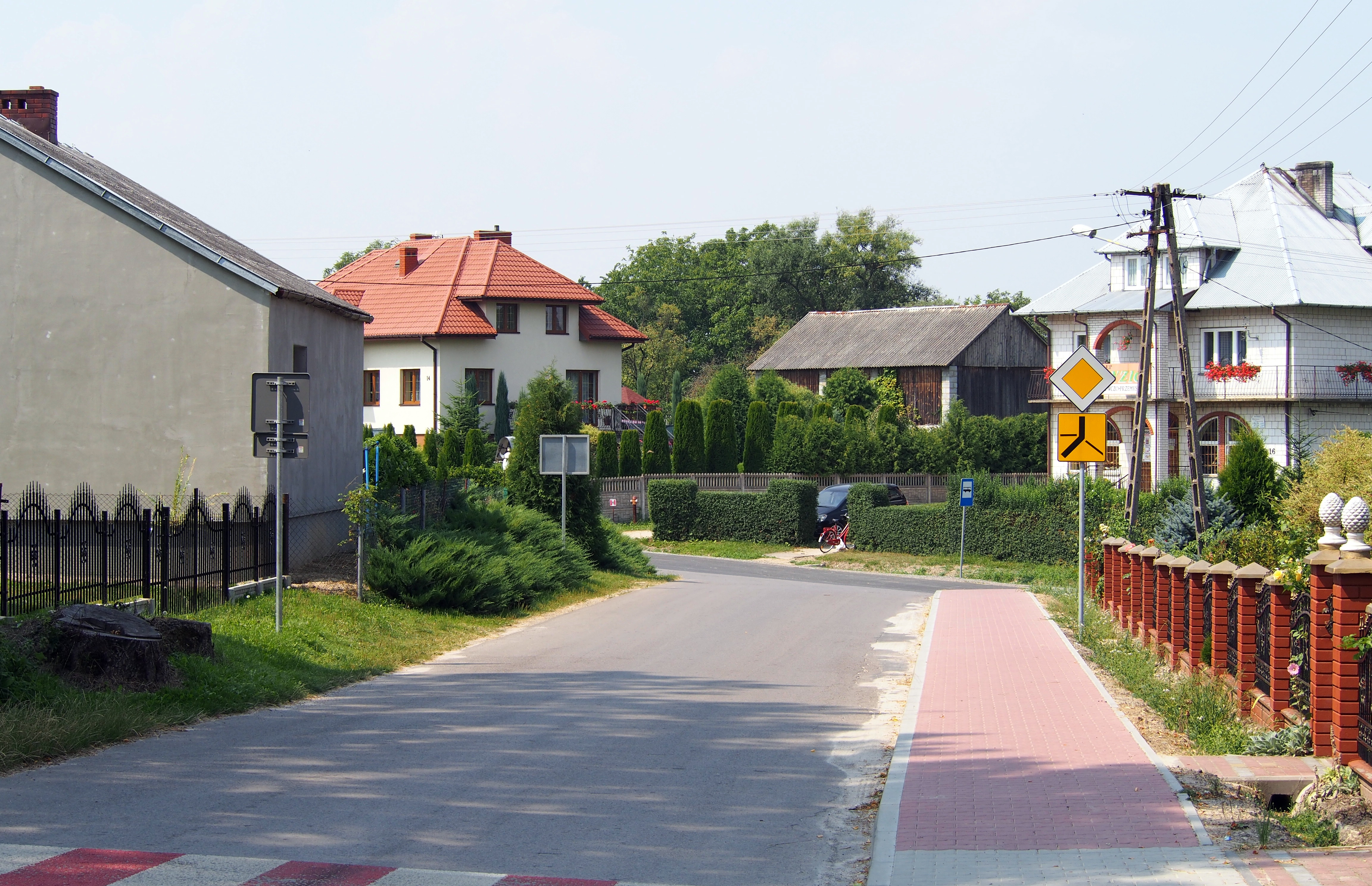

- Location within Poland
- Coordinates: 50°40′29″N 21°18′55″E
- Country: Poland
- Voivodeship: Świętokrzyskie
- County: Staszów
- Gmina: Bogoria
- Sołectwo: Szczeglice
- Elevation: 297.2 m (975 ft)

Population (31 December 2009 at Census)
  - Total: ▼239
- Time zone: UTC+1 (CET)
  - Summer (DST): UTC+2 (CEST)
- Postal code: 28-210
- Area code: +48 15
- Car plates: TSZ

Szczeglice [ʂt͡ʂɛˈɡlit͡sɛ] is a village in the administrative district of Gmina Bogoria, within Staszów County, Świętokrzyskie Voivodeship, in south-central Poland. It lies approximately 5 km (3 mi) north-east of Bogoria, 17 km (11 mi) north-east of Staszów, and 55 km (34 mi) south-east of the regional capital Kielce.
