= Mała Wieś, Świętokrzyskie Voivodeship =

Mała Wieś
- Village
- Location within Poland
- Coordinates: 50°39′51″N 21°17′12″E
- Country: Poland
- Voivodeship: Świętokrzyskie
- County: Staszów
- Gmina: Bogoria
- Sołectwo: Mała Wieś
- Elevation: 302.3 m (992 ft)

Population (31 December 2009 at Census)
  - Total: ▲95
- Time zone: UTC+1 (CET)
  - Summer (DST): UTC+2 (CEST)
- Postal code: 28–210
- Area code: +48 15
- Car plates: TSZ

Mała Wieś [ˈmawa ˈvjɛɕ] is a village in the administrative district of Gmina Bogoria, within Staszów County, Świętokrzyskie Voivodeship, in south-central Poland. It lies approximately 3 km (2 mi) north-east of Bogoria, 14 km (9 mi) north-east of Staszów, and 54 km (34 mi) south-east of the regional capital Kielce.
