= Kolonia Wysoki Małe =

- Village
- Location within Poland
- Coordinates: 50°38′33″N 21°18′18″E
- Country: Poland
- Voivodeship: Świętokrzyskie
- County: Staszów
- Gmina: Bogoria
- Sołectwo: Kolonia Wysoki Małe
- Elevation: 254 m (833 ft)

Population (31 December 2009 at Census)
  - Total: ▲111
- Time zone: UTC+1 (CET)
  - Summer (DST): UTC+2 (CEST)
- Postal code: 28-210
- Area code: +48 15
- Car plates: TSZ

Kolonia Wysoki Małe [kɔˈlɔɲa vɨˈsɔki ˈmawɛ] (till December 31, 2000 as at Wysoki-Kolonia) is a village in the administrative district of Gmina Bogoria, within Staszów County, Świętokrzyskie Voivodeship, in south-central Poland. It lies approximately 4 km (2 mi) north-east of Bogoria, 15 km (9 mi) north-east of Staszów, and 54 km (34 mi) south-east of the regional capital Kielce.
