= Pełczyce (disambiguation) =

Pełczyce may refer to the following places in Poland:

- Pełczyce, a town in West Pomeranian Voivodeship (NW Poland)
- Pełczyce, Oława County in Lower Silesian Voivodeship (south-west Poland)
- Pełczyce, Wrocław County in Lower Silesian Voivodeship (south-west Poland)
- Pełczyce, Świętokrzyskie Voivodeship (south-central Poland)
