= Zimnowoda =

Zimnowoda may refer to the following places:

- Zimnowoda, Greater Poland Voivodeship (west-central Poland)
- Zimnowoda, Masovian Voivodeship (east-central Poland)
- Zimnowoda, Świętokrzyskie Voivodeship (south-central Poland)
- Zimnowoda, Silesian Voivodeship (south Poland)
