= Kolonia Pęcławice =

- Village
- Location within Poland
- Coordinates: 50°38′30″N 21°19′01″E
- Country: Poland
- Voivodeship: Świętokrzyskie
- County: Staszów
- Gmina: Bogoria
- Sołectwo: Kolonia Pęcławice
- Elevation: 260.4 m (854 ft)

Population (31 December 2009 at Census)
  - Total: ▼142
- Time zone: UTC+1 (CET)
  - Summer (DST): UTC+2 (CEST)
- Postal code: 28–210
- Area code: +48 15
- Car plates: TSZ

Kolonia Pęcławice [kɔˈlɔɲa pɛnt͡swaˈvit͡sɛ] (till 31 December 2000 as at Tomtasówka-Kolonia Pęcławice) is a village in the administrative district of Gmina Bogoria, within Staszów County, Świętokrzyskie Voivodeship, in south-central Poland. It lies approximately 3 km (2 mi) east of Bogoria, 13 km (8 mi) north-east of Staszów, and 55 km (34 mi) south-east of the regional capital Kielce.
