= Battle of Ceber =

Minor World War II battle, part of Operation Tempest

Coordinates: 50°40′59″N 21°13′14″E

- Part of Operation Tempest in the Eastern Front of World War II
Date	4–5 August 1944
Location	Ceber, Poland
Result	Polish victory

Belligerents
Polish Underground State	Germany

Commanders and leaders
Dionizy Mędrzycki; Witold Józefowski	

Strength
84	?

Casualties and losses
1 wounded, 1 killed	40 killed, 39 captured

The Battle of Ceber was a World War II battle took place overnight on 4–5 August 1944 in the village of Ceber in the Holy Cross Mountains (Świętokrzyskie). A battalion of Polish partisans of the Home Army's 2nd Legions' Infantry Regiment led by Capt. Michał Mandziara (nom de guerre Siwy) assaulted a German garrison of the village, took it by surprise and annihilated it after a brief encounter. The battle was part of a larger Operation Tempest.

The Polish unit numbered 84 men (entire 3rd battalion of the 2nd Legions' Infantry Regiment) and was organised into two platoons led by second lieutenant Dionizy Mędrzycki (nom de guerre Reder) and second lieutenant Witold Józefowski (nom de guerre Miś). The Poles assaulted the German garrison overnight and from numerous directions. After a brief fight the enemy force was destroyed. The Poles acquired plenty of war materiel, including 22 machine guns, a gun repair shop, an infantry mortar with ammunition, an ambulance and plenty of supplies.

Polish losses were relatively small: only one soldier and one officer were wounded in action and died the following day. German losses were approximately 40 killed and 39 taken prisoner of war.
