= Gmina Bogoria =

Gmina Bogoria Bogoria Commune
- Gmina
- Coat of arms

- Location within Staszów County
- Coordinates (Bogoria): 50°39′07.32″N 21°16′45.31″E
- Country: Poland
- Voivodeship: Świętokrzyskie
- County: Staszów
- Seat: Bogoria

Area (through the years 2006-2010)
  - Total: 122.89 km^{2} (47.45 sq mi)

Population (31 December 2010 at Census)
  - Total: 7,983
  - Density: 64.96/km^{2} (168.2/sq mi)
- Time zone: UTC+1 (CET)
  - Summer (DST): UTC+2 (CEST)
- Postal code: 28-210
- Area code: +48 15
- Car plates: TSZ
- Website: http://www.bogoria.pl/

Gmina Bogoria is a rural gmina (administrative district) in Staszów County, Świętokrzyskie Voivodeship, in south-central Poland. From 1975–1998 it was part of the former Tarnobrzeg Voivodeship. The gmina seat is the city of Bogoria, which lies approximately 12 kilometres (7 mi) north-east of Staszów and 53 km (33 mi) south-east of the regional capital Kielce.

The gmina covers an area of 122.89 square kilometres (47.4 sq mi), and as of 2010 its total population is ▼7,983.

== Demography ==
According to the 2011 Poland census, there were 7,983 people residing in Bogoria Commune, of whom 50% were male and 50% were female. In the commune, the population was spread out, with 21.9% under the age of 18, 38.3% from 18 to 44, 21.9% from 45 to 64, and 17.8% who were 65 years of age or older.

Table 1. Population level of commune in 2010 — by age group
SPECIFICATION					Measure unit	POPULATION (by age group in 2010)																		
SPECIFICATION					Measure unit	TOTAL	0-4	5-9	10-14	15-19	20-24	25-29	30-34	35-39	40-44	45-49	50-54	55-59	60-64	65-69	70-74	75-79	80-84	85 +
I.	TOTAL				person	7,983	476	434	502	612	619	628	536	529	472	462	573	506	418	239	317	288	224	148
I.	—	of which in			%	100	6	5.4	6.3	7.7	7.8	7.9	6.7	6.6	5.9	5.8	7.2	6.3	5.2	3	4	3.6	2.8	1.9
I.	1.	BY SEX																						
I.	1.	A.	Males		person	3,990	251	224	254	310	312	331	268	285	249	244	335	265	211	96	126	120	67	42
I.	1.	A.	—	of which in	%	50	3.1	2.8	3.2	3.9	3.9	4.1	3.4	3.6	3.1	3.1	4.2	3.3	2.6	1.2	1.6	1.5	0.8	0.5
I.	1.	B.	Females		person	3,993	225	210	248	302	307	297	268	244	223	218	238	241	207	143	191	168	157	106
I.	1.	B.	—	of which in	%	50	2.8	2.6	3.1	3.8	3.8	3.7	3.4	3.1	2.8	2.7	3	3	2.6	1.8	2.4	2.1	2	1.3

Figure 1. Population pyramid of commune in 2010 — by age group and sex

Table 2. Population level of commune in 2010 — by sex
SPECIFICATION						Measure unit	POPULATION (by sex in 2010)		
SPECIFICATION						Measure unit	TOTAL	Males	Females
I.	TOTAL					person	7,983	3,990	3,993
I.	—	of which in				%	100	50	50
I.	1.	BY AGE GROUP							
I.	1.	A.	At pre-working age			person	1,749	906	843
I.	1.	A.	—	of which in		%	21.9	11.3	10.6
I.	1.	B.	At working age. grand total			person	4,811	2,633	2,178
I.	1.	B.	—	of which in		%	60.3	33	27.3
I.	1.	B.	a.	at mobile working age		person	3,059	1,578	1,481
I.	1.	B.	a.	—	of which in	%	38.3	19.8	18.6
I.	1.	B.	b.	at non-mobile working age		person	1,752	1,055	697
I.	1.	B.	b.	—	of which in	%	21.9	13.2	8.7
I.	1.	C.	At post-working age			person	1,423	451	972
I.	1.	C.	—	of which in		%	17.8	5.6	12.2

== Villages ==
Gmina Bogoria contains the villages and settlements of Bogoria, Budy, Ceber, Domaradzice, Gorzków, Grzybów, Józefów Witowicki, Jurkowice, Kiełczyna, Kolonia Bogoria, Kolonia Pęcławice, Kolonia Pęcławska, Kolonia Wysoki Małe, Łagówka, Mała Wieś, Malkowice, Miłoszowice, Moszyny, Niedźwiedź, Pęcławice Górne, Pełczyce, Podlesie, Przyborowice, Rosołówka, Szczeglice, Ujazdek, Wagnerówka, Wierzbka, Witowice, Wola Kiełczyńska, Wola Malkowska, Wolica, Wysoki Duże, Wysoki Małe, Wysoki Średnie, Zagorzyce and Zimnowoda.

== Neighbouring gminas ==
Gmina Bogoria is bordered by the gminas of Iwaniska, Klimontów, Raków and Staszów.
