= Witowice =

Witowice may refer to the following places in Poland:

- Witowice, Lower Silesian Voivodeship (south-west Poland)
- Witowice, Kuyavian-Pomeranian Voivodeship (north-central Poland)
- Witowice, Lublin Voivodeship (east Poland)
- Witowice, Lesser Poland Voivodeship (south Poland)
- Witowice, Świętokrzyskie Voivodeship (south-central Poland)
