= Mała Wieś =

Mała Wieś may refer to the following places:

- Mała Wieś, Radomsko County in Łódź Voivodeship (central Poland)
- Mała Wieś, Rawa County in Łódź Voivodeship (central Poland)
- Mała Wieś, Pomeranian Voivodeship (north Poland)
- Mała Wieś, Wieluń County in Łódź Voivodeship (central Poland)
- Mała Wieś, Lesser Poland Voivodeship (south Poland)
- Mała Wieś, Świętokrzyskie Voivodeship (south-central Poland)
- Mała Wieś, Białobrzegi County in Masovian Voivodeship (east-central Poland)
- Mała Wieś, Grójec County in Masovian Voivodeship (east-central Poland)
- Mała Wieś, Mińsk County in Masovian Voivodeship (east-central Poland)
- Mała Wieś, Płock County in Masovian Voivodeship (east-central Poland)
- Mała Wieś, Płońsk County in Masovian Voivodeship (east-central Poland)
- Mała Wieś, Greater Poland Voivodeship (west-central Poland)
