= Małkowski =

Małkowski (masculine) or Małkowska (feminine) may refer to

- Małkowski (surname)
- Wola Malkowska, a village in Poland
- Rainer-Malkowski-Preis, a literary prize in Germany
