= Wysoki Most =

Wysoki Most may refer to the following places in Poland:

- Wysoki Most, Kuyavian-Pomeranian Voivodeship
- Wysoki Most, Podlaskie Voivodeship

== See also ==
- Wysoki (disambiguation)
