= Bogoria, Poland =

Bogoria
- Town
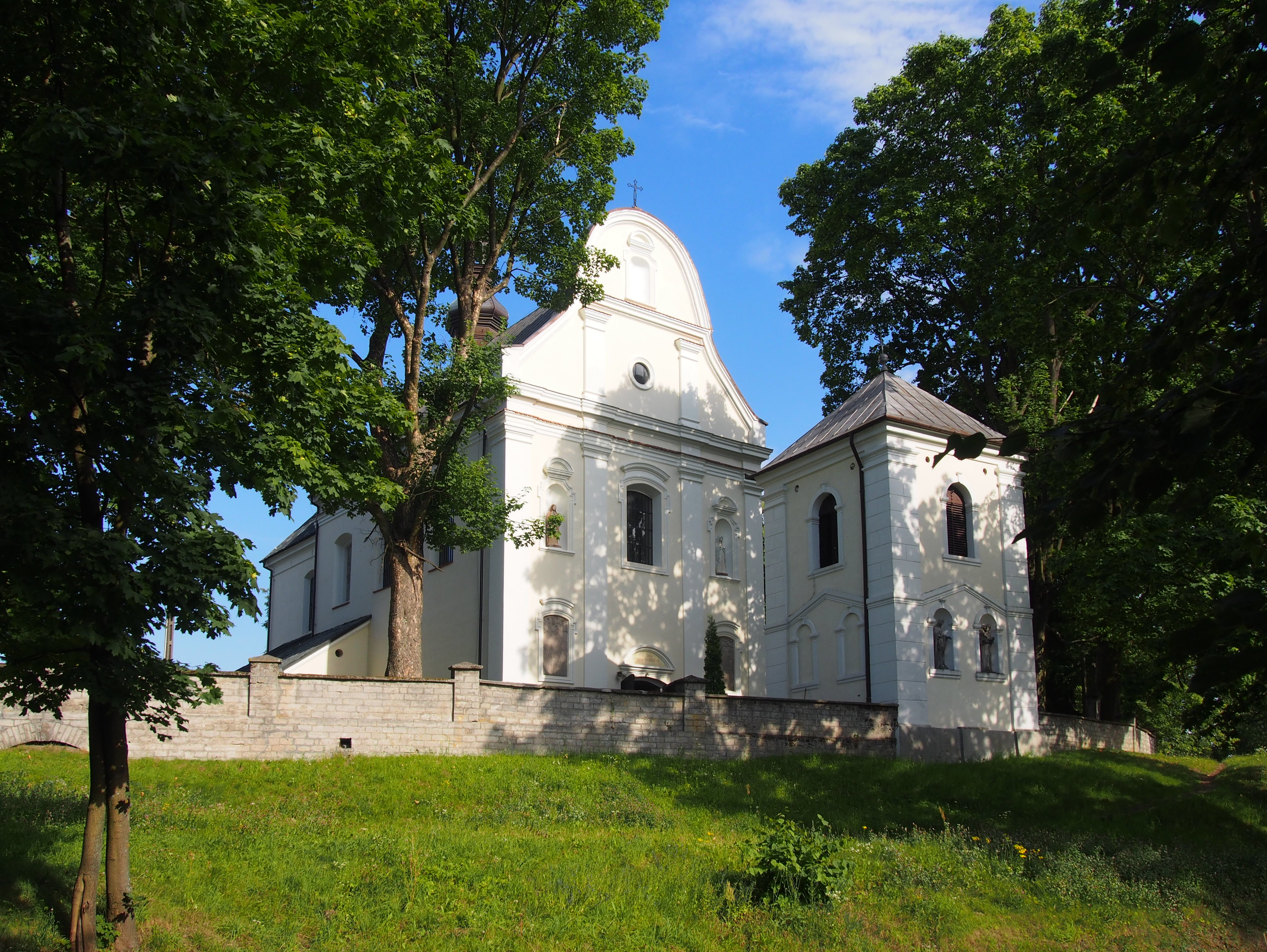

- Coat of arms

- Location within Poland
- Coordinates: 50°38′59″N 21°15′40″E
- Country: Poland
- Voivodeship: Świętokrzyskie
- County: Staszów
- Gmina: Bogoria
- Sołectwo: Bogoria
- Town rights: 1616
- Elevation: 253 m (830 ft)

Population (31 December 2009 at Census)
  - Total: ▲1,053
- Time zone: UTC+1 (CET)
  - Summer (DST): UTC+2 (CEST)
- Postal code: 28-210
- Area code: +48 15
- Car plates: TSZ
- Website: http://www.bogoria.pl/

Bogoria [bɔˈɡɔrja] is a town in Staszów County, Świętokrzyskie Voivodeship, in south-central Poland. It is the seat of the gmina (administrative district) called Gmina Bogoria. It lies approximately 12 km (7 mi) north-east of Staszów and 53 km (33 mi) south-east of the regional capital Kielce. Bogoria belongs to historic Lesser Poland.

It is notable for its 18th-century baroque church of Holy Trinity, which was built by the castellan of Sandomierz Michał Konarski, in 1748–1778, replacing a wooden church from 1620.

== History ==
The name of the village comes from the Bogoria family, which resided in the nearby village of Skotniki. In 1578, Bogoria was a small settlement, and a local nobleman named Krzysztof Bogoria Podlecki decided to found here a town. In 1616, King Sigismund III Vasa granted it Magdeburg rights, and Bogoria quickly developed, with its own town hall, artisans and eight fairs every year. The town belonged to Sandomierz Voivodeship in the Lesser Poland Province, and like other locations, it was completely destroyed by Swedish soldiers in the Deluge (1655–1660). In 1662, it had only 300 inhabitants, and by 1676, the population shrank to 100. In the 18th century, the situation improved, with merchants and cloth makers opening their shops here. In 1770, however, Bogoria burned, together with the town hall. By 1827, when after the Partitions of Poland, the town belonged to the Russian-controlled Congress Poland, it had a population of 425, with 73 houses. Bogoria lost its town charter after the November Uprising (1869), together with a number of other towns of northern Lesser Poland.

During World War II, Bogoria was one of centers of the Home Army. In December 1942, the Jędrusie resistance organization attacked a German train, robbing it of 30 tons of sugar, and killed a local German spy. Polish underground press was distributed in Bogoria. The Germans destroyed 80% of the village.
