= Staszów County =

Staszów County Powiat staszowski
- County
- Flag Coat of arms

- Location within the voivodeship

- Division into gminas
- Coordinates (Staszów): 50°31′01.56″N 21°11′37.64″E
- Country: Poland
- Voivodeship: Świętokrzyskie
- Seat: Staszów
- Gminas: Total 8: Gmina Bogoria; Gmina Łubnice; Gmina Oleśnica; Gmina Osiek; Gmina Połaniec; Gmina Rytwiany; Gmina Staszów; Gmina Szydłów

Area (through the years 2008-2010)
  - Total: 924.80 km^{2} (357.07 sq mi)

Population (2019)
  - Total: 67,331
  - Density: 72.806/km^{2} (188.57/sq mi)
  - Urban: 24,867
  - Rural: 42,464
- Time zone: UTC+1 (CET)
  - Summer (DST): UTC+2 (CEST)
- Postal code: 28-200, 28-210, 28-220, 28-221, 28-225, 28-230, 28-232 and 28-236
- Area code: + 48 15 or +48 41
- Car plates: TSZ
- Website: www.staszowski.eu

Staszów County (Polish: powiat staszowski) is a unit of territorial administration and local government (powiat) in Świętokrzyskie Voivodeship, south-central Poland. It came into being on January 1, 1999, as a result of the Polish local government reforms passed in 1998. Its administrative seat and largest town is Staszów, which lies 53 kilometres (33 mi) south-east of the regional capital Kielce. The county also contains the towns of Połaniec, lying 17 km (11 mi) south-east of Staszów, and Osiek, 21 km (13 mi) east of Staszów.

The county covers an area of 924.80 square kilometres (357.1 sq mi). As of 2019 its total population is ▼67,331, out of which the population of Staszów is ▼14,762, that of Połaniec is ▼8,098, that of Osiek is ▲2,007, and the rural population is ▼42,464.

== Demography ==
According to the 2011 Poland census, there were 73,125 people residing in Staszów County, of whom 49.5% were male and 50.5% were female (out of which the population in townships amounts to 25,336, of whom 48.8% were male and 51.2% were female; and the population of the villageships part of the county is 47,789, of whom 49.9% were male and 50.1% were female). In the county, the population was spread out, with 19.8% under the age of 18, 38.7% from 18 to 44, 24.5% from 45 to 64, and 17% who were 65 years of age or older (out of which the population in rural areas amounts to 19% under the age of 18, 39.1% from 18 to 44, 28.2% from 45 to 64, and 13.7% who were 65 years of age or older; and the population of the villageships part of the county is 20.3% under the age of 18, 38.5% from 18 to 44, 22.6% from 45 to 64, and 18.7% who were 65 years of age or older).

Table 1. Population level of county in 2010 — by age group
SPECIFICATION					Measure unit	POPULATION (by age group in 2010)																		
SPECIFICATION					Measure unit	TOTAL	0-4	5-9	10-14	15-19	20-24	25-29	30-34	35-39	40-44	45-49	50-54	55-59	60-64	65-69	70-74	75-79	80-84	85 +
I.	TOTAL				person	73,125	3,720	3,551	4,273	5,218	5,741	6,025	5,107	4,764	4,413	4,699	5,728	5,334	4,383	2,432	2,510	2,168	1,751	1,308
I.	—	of which in			%	100	5.1	4.9	5.8	7.1	7.9	8.2	7	6.5	6	6.4	7.8	7.3	6	3.3	3.4	3	2.4	1.8
I.	1.	BY SEX																						
I.	1.	A.	Males		person	36,213	1,906	1,808	2,195	2,646	2,958	3,176	2,716	2,460	2,243	2,371	2,998	2,679	2,154	1,102	998	836	615	352
I.	1.	A.	—	of which in	%	49.5	2.6	2.5	3	3.6	4	4.3	3.7	3.4	3.1	3.2	4.1	3.7	2.9	1.5	1.4	1.1	0.8	0.5
I.	1.	B.	Females		person	36,912	1,814	1,743	2,078	2,572	2,783	2,849	2,391	2,304	2,170	2,328	2,730	2,655	2,229	1,330	1,512	1,332	1,136	956
I.	1.	B.	—	of which in	%	50.5	2.5	2.4	2.8	3.5	3.8	3.9	3.3	3.2	3	3.2	3.7	3.6	3	1.8	2.1	1.8	1.6	1.3

Table 2. Population level of townships in 2010 — by age group
SPECIFICATION					Measure unit	POPULATION (by age group in 2010)																		
SPECIFICATION					Measure unit	TOTAL	0-4	5-9	10-14	15-19	20-24	25-29	30-34	35-39	40-44	45-49	50-54	55-59	60-64	65-69	70-74	75-79	80-84	85 +
I.	TOTAL				person	25,336	1,281	1,133	1,437	1,721	2,014	2,174	1,861	1,591	1,515	1,790	2,370	2,172	1,688	841	680	512	305	251
I.	—	of which in			%	100	5.1	4.5	5.7	6.8	7.9	8.6	7.3	6.3	6	7.1	9.4	8.6	6.7	3.3	2.7	2	1.2	1
I.	1.	BY SEX																						
I.	1.	A.	Males		person	12,372	648	556	758	852	992	1,192	973	812	718	838	1,134	1,035	804	387	279	202	132	60
I.	1.	A.	—	of which in	%	48.8	2.6	2.2	3	3.4	3.9	4.7	3.8	3.2	2.8	3.3	4.5	4.1	3.2	1.5	1.1	0.8	0.5	0.2
I.	1.	B.	Females		person	12,964	633	577	679	869	1,022	982	888	779	797	952	1,236	1,137	884	454	401	310	173	191
I.	1.	B.	—	of which in	%	51.2	2.5	2.3	2.7	3.4	4	3.9	3.5	3.1	3.1	3.8	4.9	4.5	3.5	1.8	1.6	1.2	0.7	0.8

Table 3. Population level of villageships in 2010 — by age group
SPECIFICATION					Measure unit	POPULATION (by age group in 2010)																		
SPECIFICATION					Measure unit	TOTAL	0-4	5-9	10-14	15-19	20-24	25-29	30-34	35-39	40-44	45-49	50-54	55-59	60-64	65-69	70-74	75-79	80-84	85 +
I.	TOTAL				person	47,789	2,439	2,418	2,836	3,497	3,727	3,851	3,246	3,173	2,898	2,909	3,358	3,162	2,695	1,591	1,830	1,656	1,446	1,057
I.	—	of which in			%	100	5.1	5.1	5.9	7.3	7.8	8.1	6.8	6.6	6.1	6.1	7	6.6	5.6	3.3	3.8	3.5	3	2.2
I.	1.	BY SEX																						
I.	1.	A.	Males		person	23,841	1,258	1,252	1,437	1,794	1,966	1,984	1,743	1,648	1,525	1,533	1,864	1,644	1,350	715	719	634	483	292
I.	1.	A.	—	of which in	%	49.9	2.6	2.6	3	3.8	4.1	4.2	3.6	3.4	3.2	3.2	3.9	3.4	2.8	1.5	1.5	1.3	1	0.6
I.	1.	B.	Females		person	23,948	1,181	1,166	1,399	1,703	1,761	1,867	1,503	1,525	1,373	1,376	1,494	1,518	1,345	876	1,111	1,022	963	765
I.	1.	B.	—	of which in	%	50.1	2.5	2.4	2.9	3.6	3.7	3.9	3.1	3.2	2.9	2.9	3.1	3.2	2.8	1.8	2.3	2.1	2	1.6

Figure 1. Population pyramid of county in 2010 — by age group and sex
Figure 2. Population pyramid of townships in 2010 — by age group and sex
Figure 3. Population pyramid of villageships in 2010 — by age group and sex

Table 4. Population level of county in 2010 — by sex
SPECIFICATION						Measure unit	POPULATION (by sex in 2010)		
SPECIFICATION						Measure unit	TOTAL	Males	Females
I.	TOTAL					person	73,125	36,213	36,912
I.	—	of which in				%	100	49.5	50.5
I.	1.	BY AGE GROUP							
I.	1.	A.	At pre-working age			person	14,509	7,439	7,070
I.	1.	A.	—	of which in		%	19.8	10.1	9.7
I.	1.	B.	At working age. grand total			person	46,218	24,871	21,347
I.	1.	B.	—	of which in		%	63.2	34	29.2
I.	1.	B.	a.	at mobile working age		person	28,303	14,669	13,634
I.	1.	B.	a.	—	of which in	%	38.7	20.1	18.6
I.	1.	B.	b.	at non-mobile working age		person	17,915	10,202	7,713
I.	1.	B.	b.	—	of which in	%	24.5	14	10.5
I.	1.	C.	At post-working age			person	12,398	3,903	8,495
I.	1.	C.	—	of which in		%	17	5.4	11.6

Table 5. Population level of townships in 2010 — by sex
SPECIFICATION						Measure unit	POPULATION (by sex in 2010)		
SPECIFICATION						Measure unit	TOTAL	Males	Females
I.	TOTAL					person	25,336	12,372	12,964
I.	—	of which in				%	100	48.8	51.2
I.	1.	BY AGE GROUP							
I.	1.	A.	At pre-working age			person	4,823	2,464	2,359
I.	1.	A.	—	of which in		%	19	9.7	9.3
I.	1.	B.	At working age. grand total			person	17,040	8,848	8,192
I.	1.	B.	—	of which in		%	67.3	34.9	32.3
I.	1.	B.	a.	at mobile working age		person	9,904	5,037	4,867
I.	1.	B.	a.	—	of which in	%	39.1	19.9	19.2
I.	1.	B.	b.	at non-mobile working age		person	7,136	3,811	3,325
I.	1.	B.	b.	—	of which in	%	28.2	15.1	13.1
I.	1.	C.	At post-working age			person	3,473	1,060	2,413
I.	1.	C.	—	of which in		%	13.7	4.2	9.5

Table 6. Population level of villageships in 2010 — by sex
SPECIFICATION						Measure unit	POPULATION (by sex in 2010)		
SPECIFICATION						Measure unit	TOTAL	Males	Females
I.	TOTAL					person	47,789	23,841	23,948
I.	—	of which in				%	100	49.9	50.1
I.	1.	BY AGE GROUP							
I.	1.	A.	At pre-working age			person	9,686	4,975	4,711
I.	1.	A.	—	of which in		%	20.3	10.4	9.9
I.	1.	B.	At working age. grand total			person	29,178	16,023	13,155
I.	1.	B.	—	of which in		%	61.1	33.5	27.5
I.	1.	B.	a.	at mobile working age		person	18,399	9,632	8,767
I.	1.	B.	a.	—	of which in	%	38.5	20.2	18.3
I.	1.	B.	b.	at non-mobile working age		person	10,779	6,391	4,388
I.	1.	B.	b.	—	of which in	%	22.6	13.4	9.2
I.	1.	C.	At post-working age			person	8,925	2,843	6,082
I.	1.	C.	—	of which in		%	18.7	5.9	12.7

== Neighbouring counties ==
Staszów County is bordered by Opatów County to the north-east, Sandomierz County and Tarnobrzeg County to the east, Mielec County and Dąbrowa County to the south, Busko County to the west, and Kielce County to the north-west.

== Administrative divisions ==
The county is subdivided into eight gminas (three urban-rural and five rural). These are listed in the following table, in descending order of population.

Gmina	Type	Area (km^{2})	Population (2010)	Seat
Gmina Staszów	urban-rural	227.52	25,695	Staszów
Gmina Połaniec	urban-rural	75.01	11,814	Połaniec
Gmina Bogoria	rural	122.89	7,703	Bogoria
Gmina Osiek	urban-rural	129.30	7,744	Osiek
Gmina Rytwiany	rural	124.66	6,367	Rytwiany
Gmina Szydłów	rural	107.90	3,595	Szydłów
Gmina Łubnice	rural	84.14	4,116	Łubnice
Gmina Oleśnica	rural	53.38	2,020	Oleśnica
