= Budziska =

Budziska may refer to:

- Budziska, Kuyavian-Pomeranian Voivodeship (north-central Poland)
- Budziska, Lublin Voivodeship (east Poland)
- Budziska, Świętokrzyskie Voivodeship (south-central Poland)
- Budziska, Garwolin County in Masovian Voivodeship (east-central Poland)
- Budziska, Gmina Halinów in Masovian Voivodeship (east-central Poland)
- Budziska, Gmina Latowicz in Masovian Voivodeship (east-central Poland)
- Budziska, Węgrów County in Masovian Voivodeship (east-central Poland)
- Budziska, Silesian Voivodeship (south Poland)
- Budziska, Pomeranian Voivodeship (north Poland)
- Budziska, Gołdap County in Warmian-Masurian Voivodeship (north Poland)
- Budziska, Mrągowo County in Warmian-Masurian Voivodeship (north Poland)
