= Beszowa =

- Village
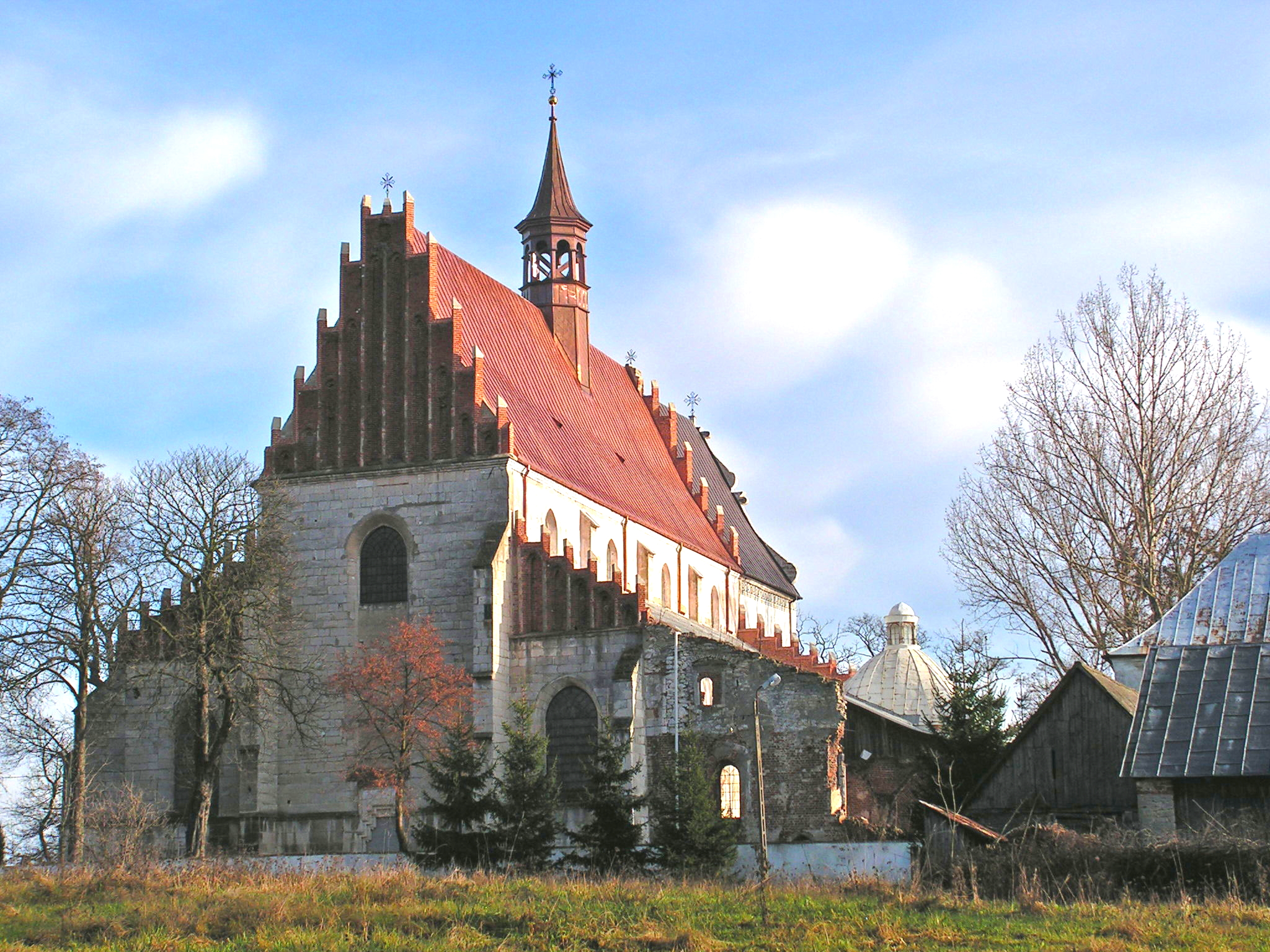
- Saints Peter and Paul church in Beszowa

- Location within Poland
- Coordinates: 50°25′07″N 21°06′46″E
- Country: Poland
- Voivodeship: Świętokrzyskie
- County: Staszów
- Gmina: Łubnice
- Sołectwo: Beszowa
- Elevation: 188.6 m (619 ft)

Population (31 December 2009 at Census)
  - Total: ▲281
- Time zone: UTC+1 (CET)
  - Summer (DST): UTC+2 (CEST)
- Postal code: 28-232
- Area code: +48 15
- Car plates: TSZ

Beszowa [bɛˈʂɔva] is a village in the administrative district of Gmina Łubnice, within Staszów County, Świętokrzyskie Voivodeship, in southern Poland. It lies approximately 3 km (2 mi) north-west of Łubnice, 16 km (10 mi) south of Staszów, and 62 km (39 mi) south-east of the regional capital Kielce.

From 1975 to 1998 the town was administratively part of the Tarnobrzeg Voivodeship.
