= Mieczysław Gil =

Polish trade unionist and politician (1944–2022)

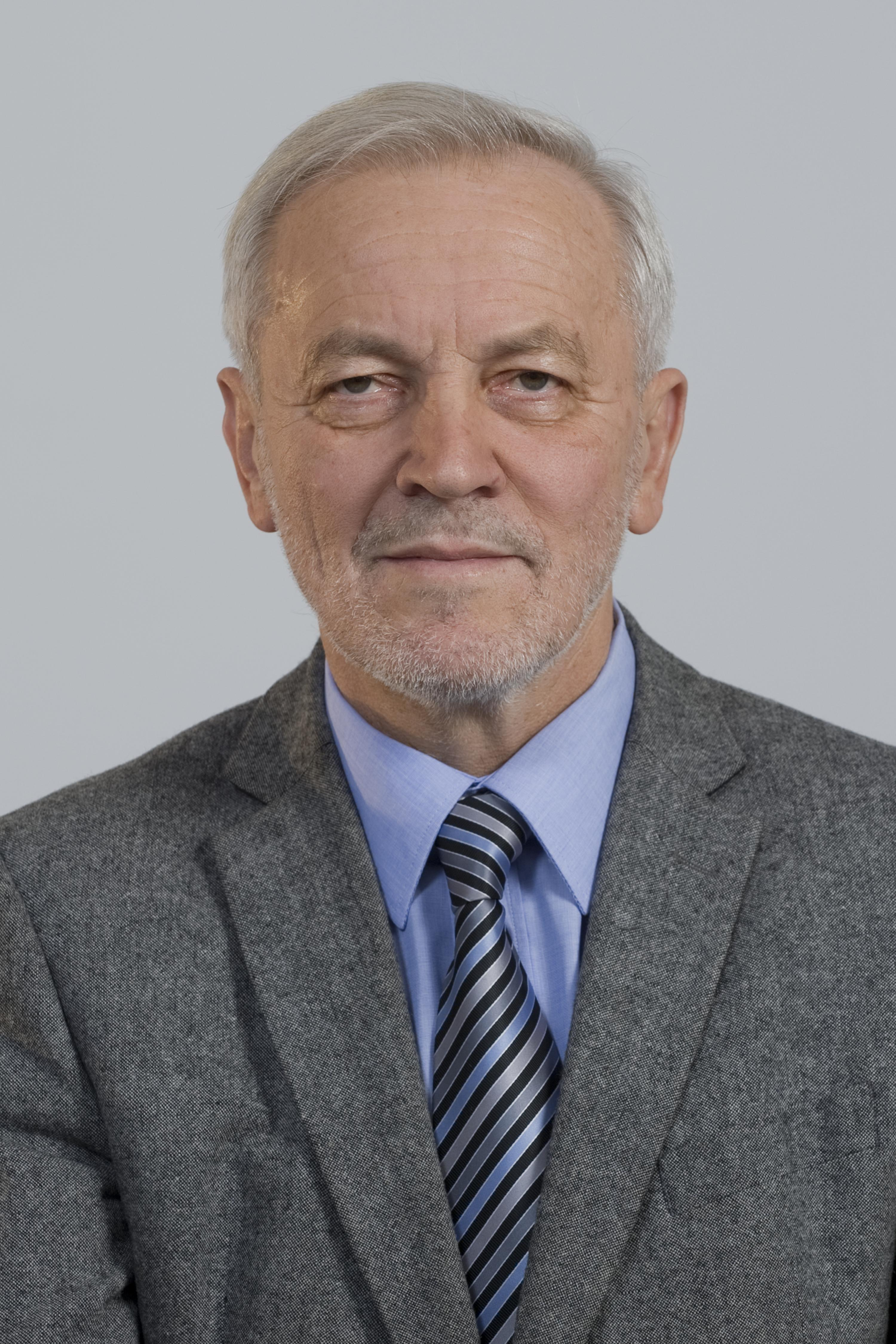
- Gil in 2011

Member of the Senate of Poland
- In office 8 November 2011 – 11 November 2015

Member of the Sejm
- In office 18 June 1989 – 31 May 1993

Personal details
- Born: Mieczysław Władysław Gil; 9 January 1944 Gace Słupieckie, General Government
- Died: 29 September 2022 (aged 78) Kraków, Poland
- Party: PZPR (1968–1982); KO "S"; PChD (1996–1999); PPChD; PiS
- Education: Technikum Hutniczo-Mechaniczne w Nowej Hucie
- Occupation: Trade unionist

Mieczysław Władysław Gil (9 January 1944 – 29 September 2022) was a Polish trade unionist and politician. A member of the Solidarity Citizens' Committee and later Law and Justice, he served in the Sejm from 1989 to 1993 and the Senate from 2011 to 2015.

Gil died on 29 September 2022, at the age of 78.
