= Przeczów, Świętokrzyskie Voivodeship =

Przeczów
- Village
- Location within Poland
- Coordinates: 50°24′34″N 21°12′03″E
- Country: Poland
- Voivodeship: Świętokrzyskie
- County: Staszów
- Gmina: Łubnice
- Sołectwo: Przeczów
- Elevation: 162.8 m (534 ft)

Population (31 December 2009 at Census)
  - Total: ▼313
- Time zone: UTC+1 (CET)
  - Summer (DST): UTC+2 (CEST)
- Postal code: 28-232
- Area code: +48 15
- Car plates: TSZ

Przeczów [ˈpʂɛt͡ʂuf] is a village in the administrative district of Gmina Łubnice, within Staszów County, Świętokrzyskie Voivodeship, in south-central Poland. It lies approximately 3 km (2 mi) east of Łubnice, 18 km (11 mi) south of Staszów, and 67 km (42 mi) south-east of the regional capital Kielce.
