= Słupiec =

Słupiec may refer to places in Poland:

- Słupiec, Lesser Poland Voivodeship, a village in the Gmina Szczucin, Dąbrowa County
- Słupiec, Lower Silesian Voivodeship, a district of Nowa Ruda, Kłodzko County
- Słupiec, Świętokrzyskie Voivodeship, a village in the Gmina Łubnice, Staszów County

== See also ==
- Słupca
- Słupsk
