= Wolica, Gmina Łubnice =

Wolica
- Village
- Location within Poland
- Coordinates: 50°27′14″N 21°10′45″E
- Country: Poland
- Voivodeship: Świętokrzyskie
- County: Staszów
- Gmina: Łubnice
- Sołectwo: Wolica
- Elevation: 166.4 m (546 ft)

Population (31 December 2009 at Census)
  - Total: ▲255
- Time zone: UTC+1 (CET)
  - Summer (DST): UTC+2 (CEST)
- Postal code: 28-232
- Area code: +48 15
- Car plates: TSZ

Wolica [vɔˈlit͡sa] is a village in the administrative district of Gmina Łubnice, within Staszów County, Świętokrzyskie Voivodeship, in south-central Poland. It lies approximately 6 km (4 mi) north-east of Łubnice, 12 km (7 mi) south of Staszów, and 62 km (39 mi) south-east of the regional capital Kielce.
