= Grabowa =

Grabowa may refer to the following places:

- Grabowa (river) (German: Grabow), a river in Pomerania, northern Poland
- Grabowa, Opoczno County in Łódź Voivodeship (central Poland)
- Grabowa, Wieluń County in Łódź Voivodeship (central Poland)
- Grabowa, Świętokrzyskie Voivodeship (south-central Poland)
- Grabowa, Gmina Potworów in Masovian Voivodeship (east-central Poland)
- Grabowa, Gmina Rusinów in Masovian Voivodeship (east-central Poland)
- Grabowa, Greater Poland Voivodeship (west-central Poland)
- Grabowa, Częstochowa County in Silesian Voivodeship (south Poland)
