= Walter Raymond (disambiguation) =

Walter Raymond was a novelist.

Walter Raymond may also refer to:

- Walter John Raymond, academic
- Walter Raymond of Raymond & Whitcomb Travel Association, namesake of Raymond, California
