= Borki, Staszów County =

Borki
- Village
- Location within Poland
- Coordinates: 50°26′04″N 21°10′09″E
- Country: Poland
- Voivodeship: Świętokrzyskie
- County: Staszów
- Gmina: Łubnice
- Sołectwo: Borki
- Elevation: 199.9 m (656 ft)

Population (31 December 2009 at Census)
  - Total: ▼119
- Time zone: UTC+1 (CET)
  - Summer (DST): UTC+2 (CEST)
- Postal code: 28-232
- Area code: +48 15
- Car plates: TSZ

Borki [ˈbɔrki] is a village in the administrative district of Gmina Łubnice, within Staszów County, Świętokrzyskie Voivodeship, in south-central Poland. It lies approximately 3 km (2 mi) north-east of Łubnice, 15 km (9 mi) south of Staszów, and 64 km (40 mi) south-east of the regional capital Kielce.
