= Czarzyzna =

- Village
- Location within Poland
- Coordinates: 50°22′50″N 21°11′35″E
- Country: Poland
- Voivodeship: Świętokrzyskie
- County: Staszów
- Gmina: Łubnice
- Sołectwo: Czarzyzna
- Elevation: 158.8 m (521 ft)

Population (31 December 2009 at Census)
  - Total: ▼313
- Time zone: UTC+1 (CET)
  - Summer (DST): UTC+2 (CEST)
- Postal code: 28-232
- Area code: +48 15
- Car plates: TSZ

Czarzyzna [t͡ʂaˈʐɨzna] is a village in the administrative district of Gmina Łubnice, within Staszów County, Świętokrzyskie Voivodeship, in south-central Poland. It lies approximately 5 km (3 mi) south-east of Łubnice, 20 km (12 mi) south of Staszów, and 70 km (43 mi) south-east of the regional capital Kielce.
