= Rejterówka =

- Village
- Location within Poland
- Coordinates: 50°23′11″N 21°10′24″E
- Country: Poland
- Voivodeship: Świętokrzyskie
- County: Staszów
- Gmina: Łubnice
- Sołectwo: Rejterówka
- Elevation: 158.4 m (520 ft)

Population (31 December 2009 at Census)
  - Total: 108
- Time zone: UTC+1 (CET)
  - Summer (DST): UTC+2 (CEST)
- Postal code: 28-232
- Area code: +48 15
- Car plates: TSZ

Rejterówka [rɛi̯tɛˈrufka] is a village in the administrative district of Gmina Łubnice, within Staszów County, Świętokrzyskie Voivodeship, in south-central Poland. It lies approximately 4 km (2 mi) south-east of Łubnice, 20 km (12 mi) south of Staszów, and 68 km (42 mi) south-east of the regional capital Kielce.
