= Orzelec Duży =

- Village
- Location within Poland
- Coordinates: 50°23′52″N 21°08′27″E
- Country: Poland
- Voivodeship: Świętokrzyskie
- County: Staszów
- Gmina: Łubnice
- Sołectwo: Orzelec Duży
- Elevation: 179.7 m (590 ft)

Population (31 December 2009 at Census)
  - Total: ▼300
- Time zone: UTC+1 (CET)
  - Summer (DST): UTC+2 (CEST)
- Postal code: 28-232
- Area code: +48 15
- Car plates: TSZ

Orzelec Duży [ɔˈʐɛlɛt͡s ˈduʐɨ] is a village in the administrative district of Gmina Łubnice, within Staszów County, Świętokrzyskie Voivodeship, in south-central Poland. It lies approximately 2 km (1 mi) south of Łubnice, 19 km (12 mi) south of Staszów, and 66 km (41 mi) south-east of the regional capital Kielce.
