= Jankowice, Racibórz County =

Jankowice
- Village
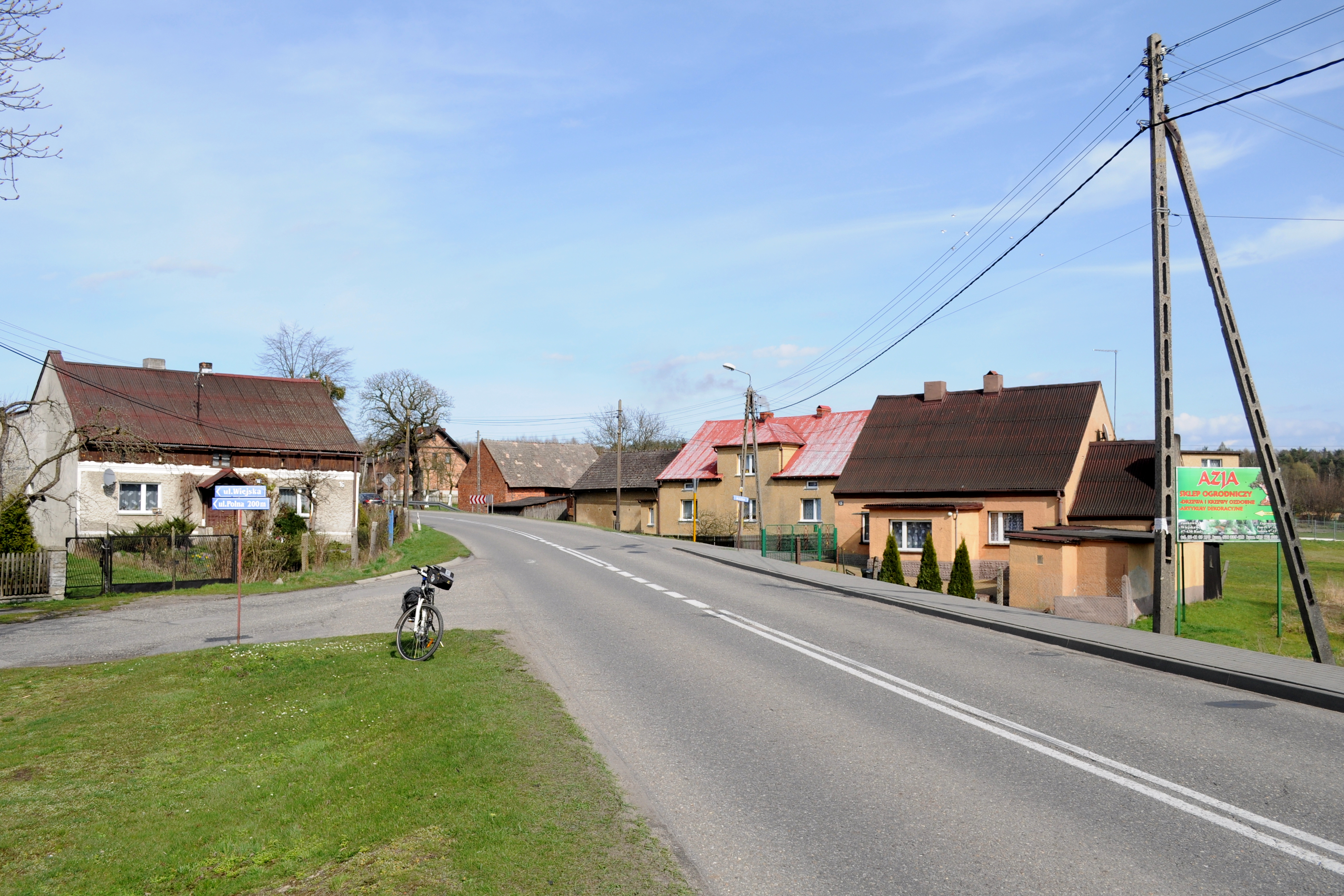
- Road through the village

- Location within Poland
- Coordinates: 50°10′6″N 18°23′16″E
- Country: Poland
- Voivodeship: Silesian
- County: Racibórz
- Gmina: Kuźnia Raciborska
- Population: 440

Jankowice [jankɔˈvit͡sɛ] is a village in the administrative district of Gmina Kuźnia Raciborska, within Racibórz County, Silesian Voivodeship, in southern Poland.
