= Turze, Silesian Voivodeship =

Turze
- Village
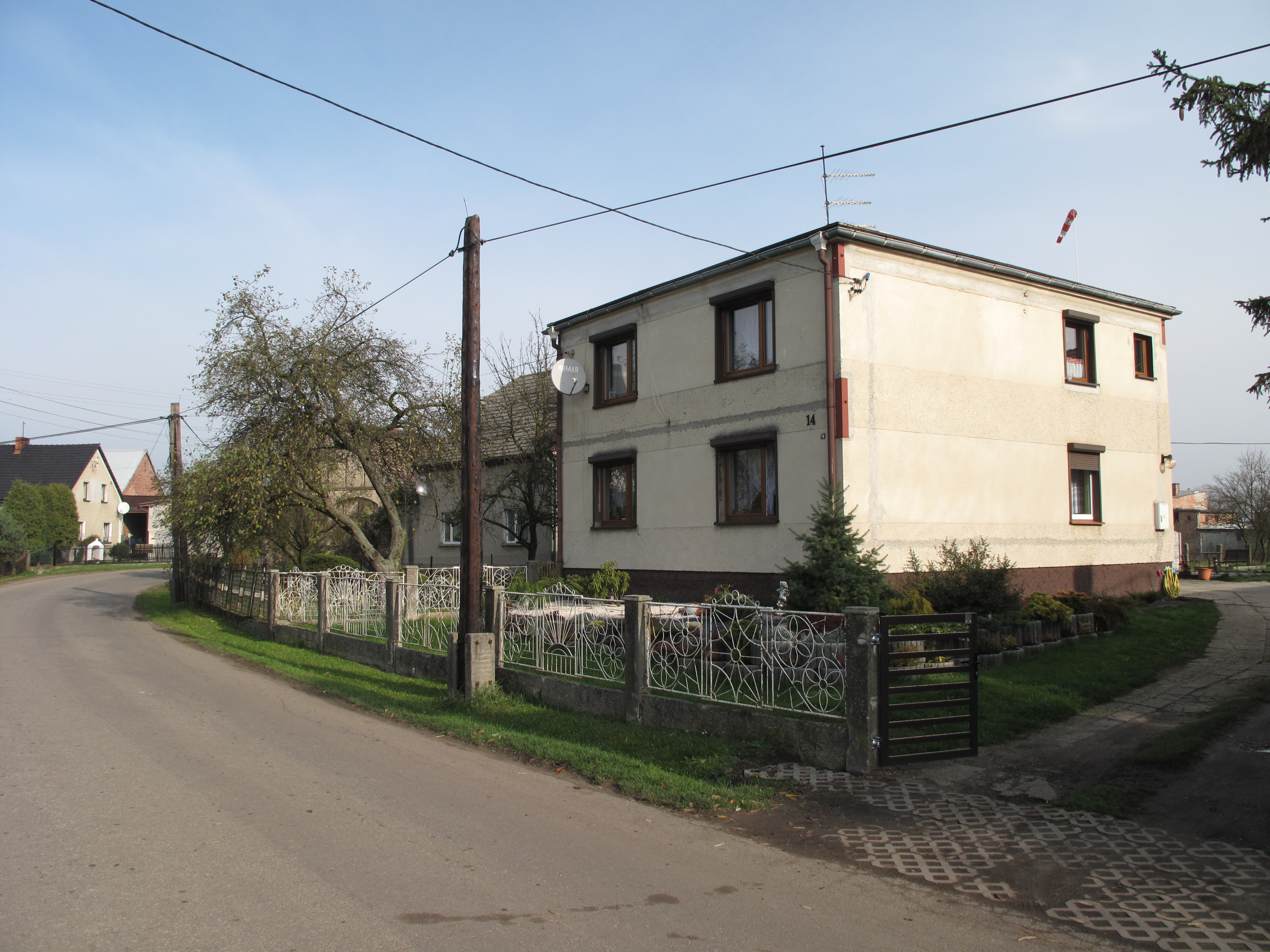
- Houses

- Location within Poland
- Coordinates: 50°11′N 18°16′E
- Country: Poland
- Voivodeship: Silesian
- County: Racibórz
- Gmina: Kuźnia Raciborska
- Population: 950

Turze [ˈtuʐɛ] is a village in the administrative district of Gmina Kuźnia Raciborska, within Racibórz County, Silesian Voivodeship, in southern Poland.

Ruda River enters the Odra River in the village.

== Gallery ==
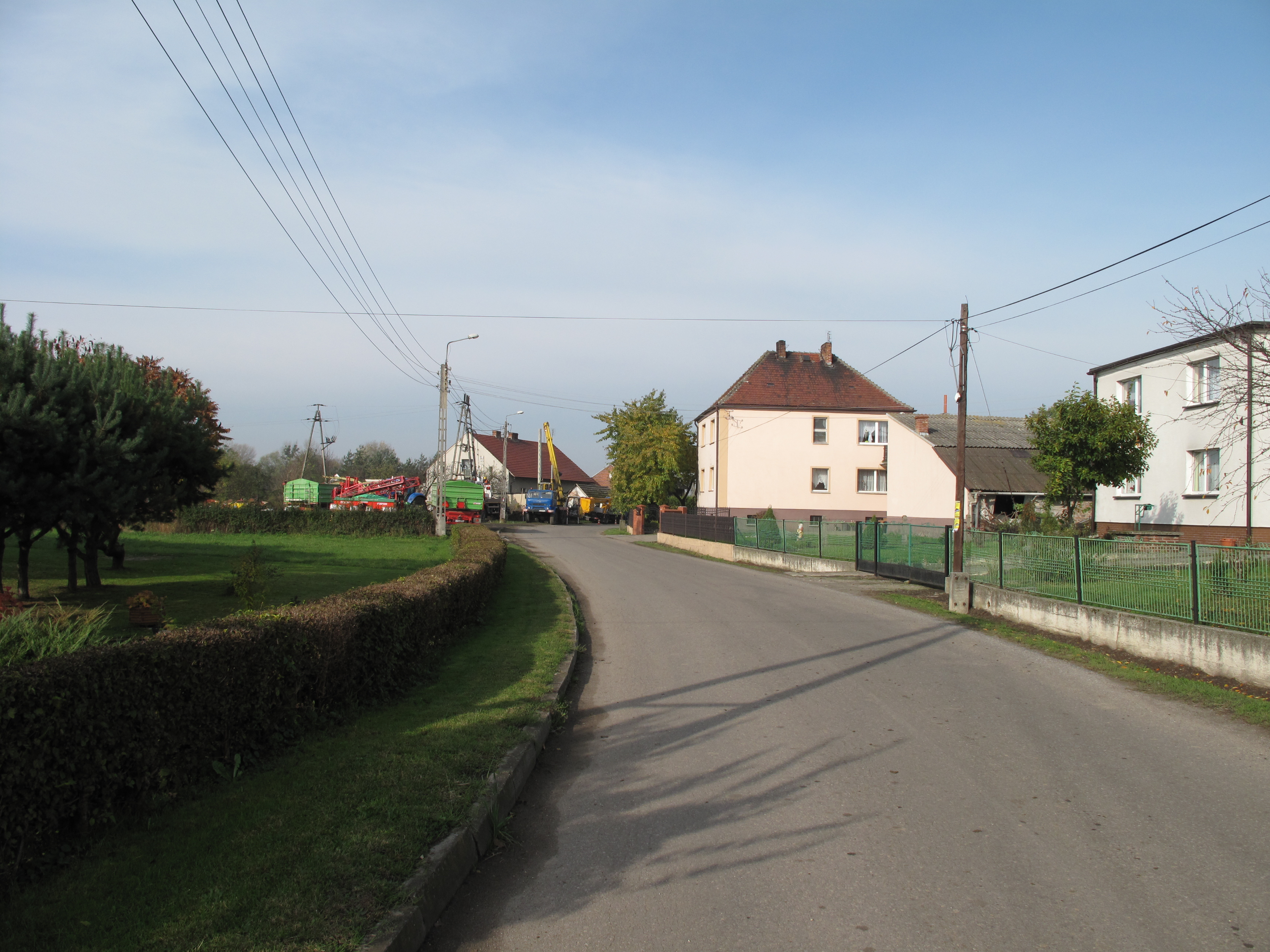
Powerline deployment

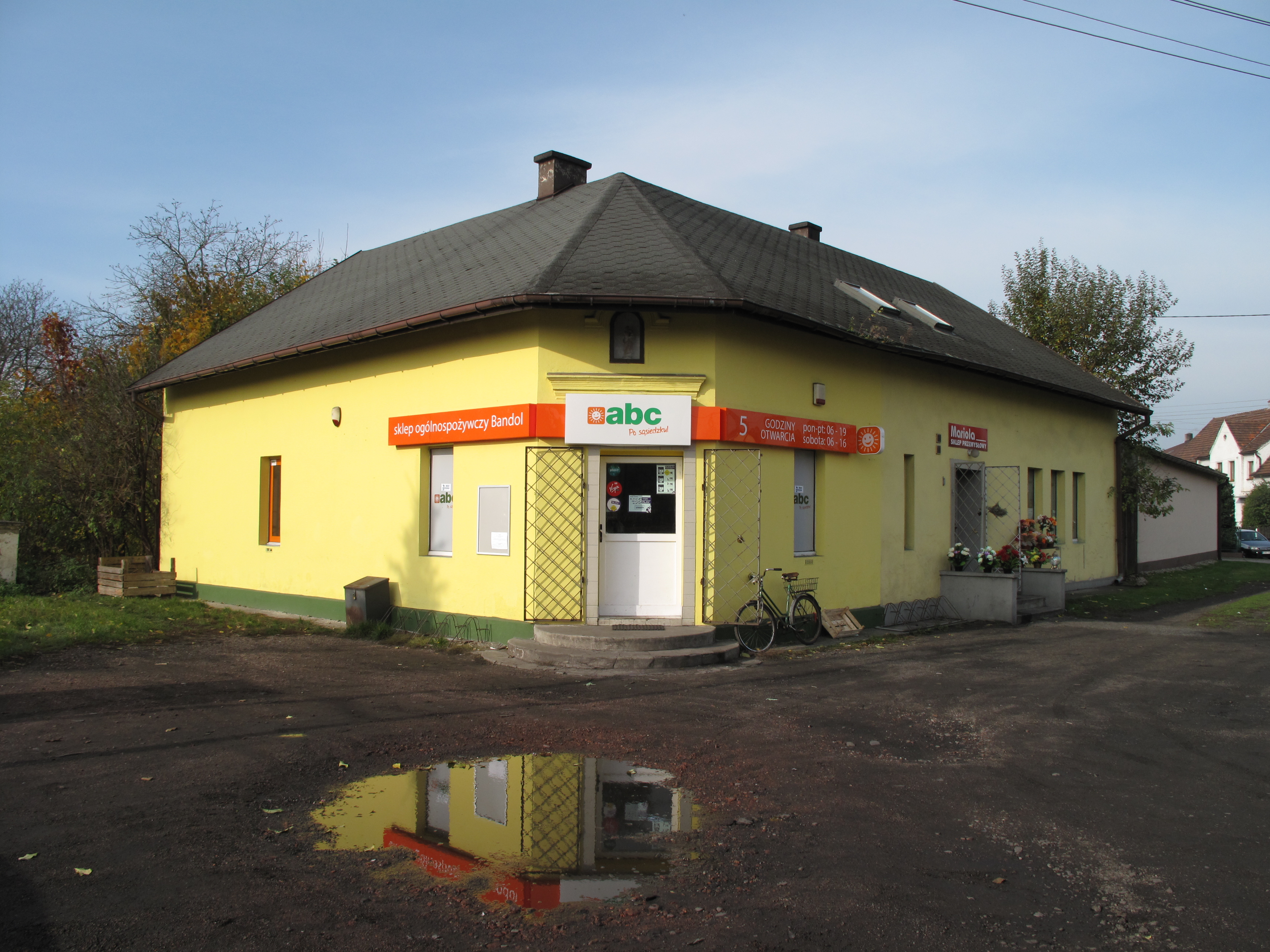
Shop

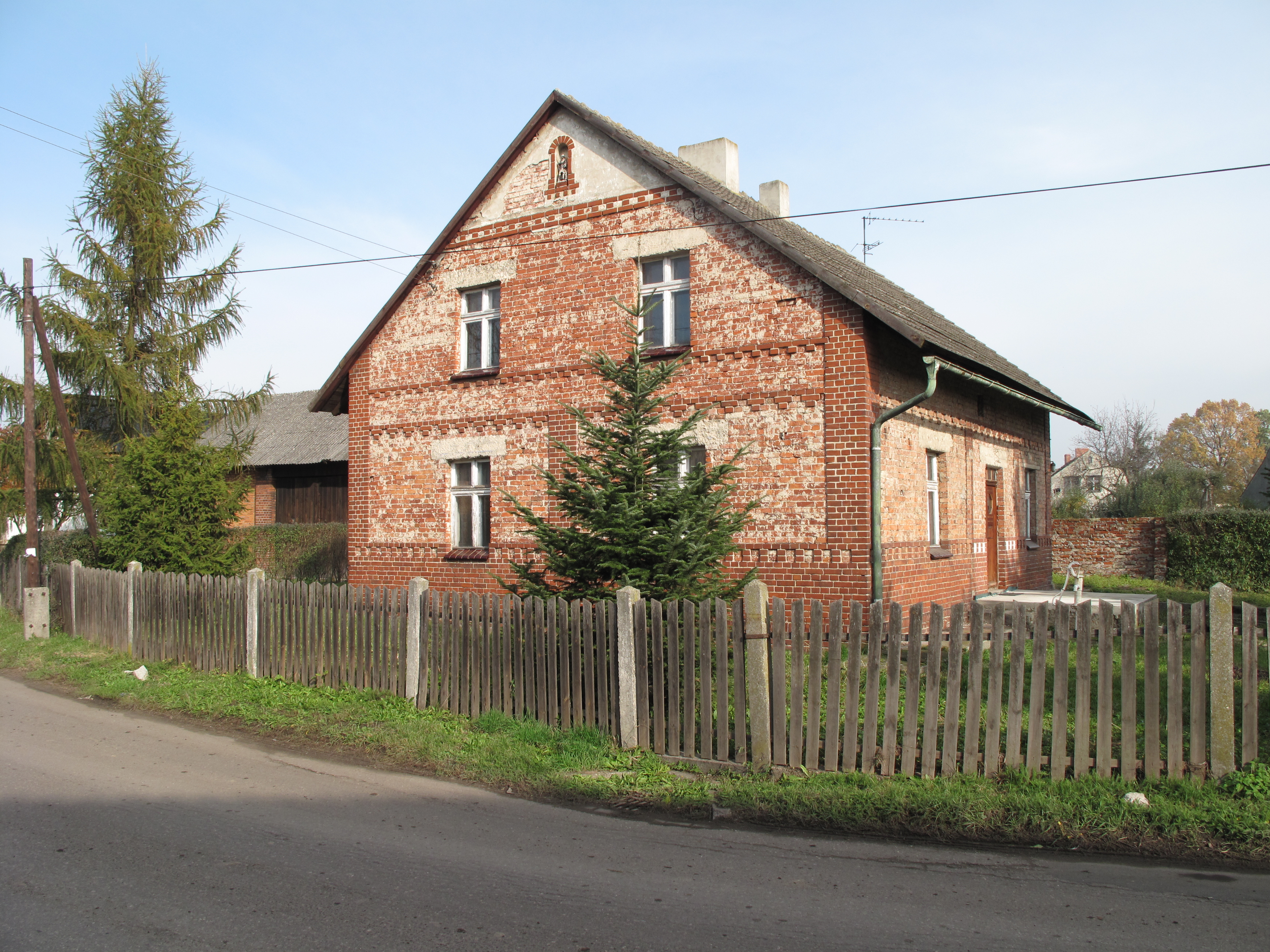
House
