= Grabowa, Świętokrzyskie Voivodeship =

Grabowa
- Village
- Location within Poland
- Coordinates: 50°25′20″N 21°11′20″E
- Country: Poland
- Voivodeship: Świętokrzyskie
- County: Staszów
- Gmina: Łubnice
- Sołectwo: Grabowa
- Elevation: 194.2 m (637 ft)

Population (31 December 2009 at Census)
  - Total: ▼67
- Time zone: UTC+1 (CET)
  - Summer (DST): UTC+2 (CEST)
- Postal code: 28-232
- Area code: +48 15
- Car plates: TSZ

Grabowa [ɡraˈbɔva] is a village in the administrative district of Gmina Łubnice, within Staszów County, Świętokrzyskie Voivodeship, in south-central Poland. It lies approximately 4 km (2 mi) north-east of Łubnice, 16 km (10 mi) south of Staszów, and 66 km (41 mi) south-east of the regional capital Kielce.
