= Walter John Raymond =

Walter John Raymond (February 24, 1930 – October 14, 2007) was an American publisher, professor of political science, and chairman of Saint Paul's College's Department of Social Sciences until he retired in 1986. He was part of the Polish underground and received the Partisan Cross from the Polish Armed Forces.

== Early life ==
Raymond was born in Szczebrzusz, Poland, the son of a naturalized U.S. citizen who had emigrated from Poland and later returned.

During World War II, the family farm was occupied by German troops and later by Russian forces. The family hid two young Jewish men despite daily Gestapo searches. Raymond ran messages for the Polish underground when he was 14.

After the war, when the communist government wanted him to enlist in the Polish Army, he fled to Berlin. He came to the United States in 1952.

== Education and professorships ==
Raymond worked as a bus dispatcher in Washington, D.C. until completing his master's degree in political science from the University of Maryland in 1961. He earned a doctorate in political science from Clark Atlanta University.

He taught at Hampton Institute, the College of William and Mary and Virginia Commonwealth University.

== Publishing company ==
In 1967, Raymond and his wife founded Brunswick Publishing Corp., initially so he could publish his 767pp. volume now called the Dictionary of Politics, Selected American and Foreign Political and Legal Terms.

== Works ==
- Raymond, Walter John. (1992). Politics: Selected American and Foreign Political and Legal Terms, 7th ed. Lawrenceville, Virginia: Brunswick Publishing Corporation. ISBN 978-1556180088
- Belyakov, Vladimir Veniaminovich; and Walter John Raymond, eds. (1994). Constitution of the Russian Federation: With Commentaries and Interpretation. Lawrenceville, Virginia: Brunswick Publishing Corporation, 1994. ISBN 978-1556181429

== Awards ==
In 1991, Raymond was honored with the Polish Armed Forces Partisan Cross for his actions in the Second World War.
