= Ruda Kozielska =

- Village
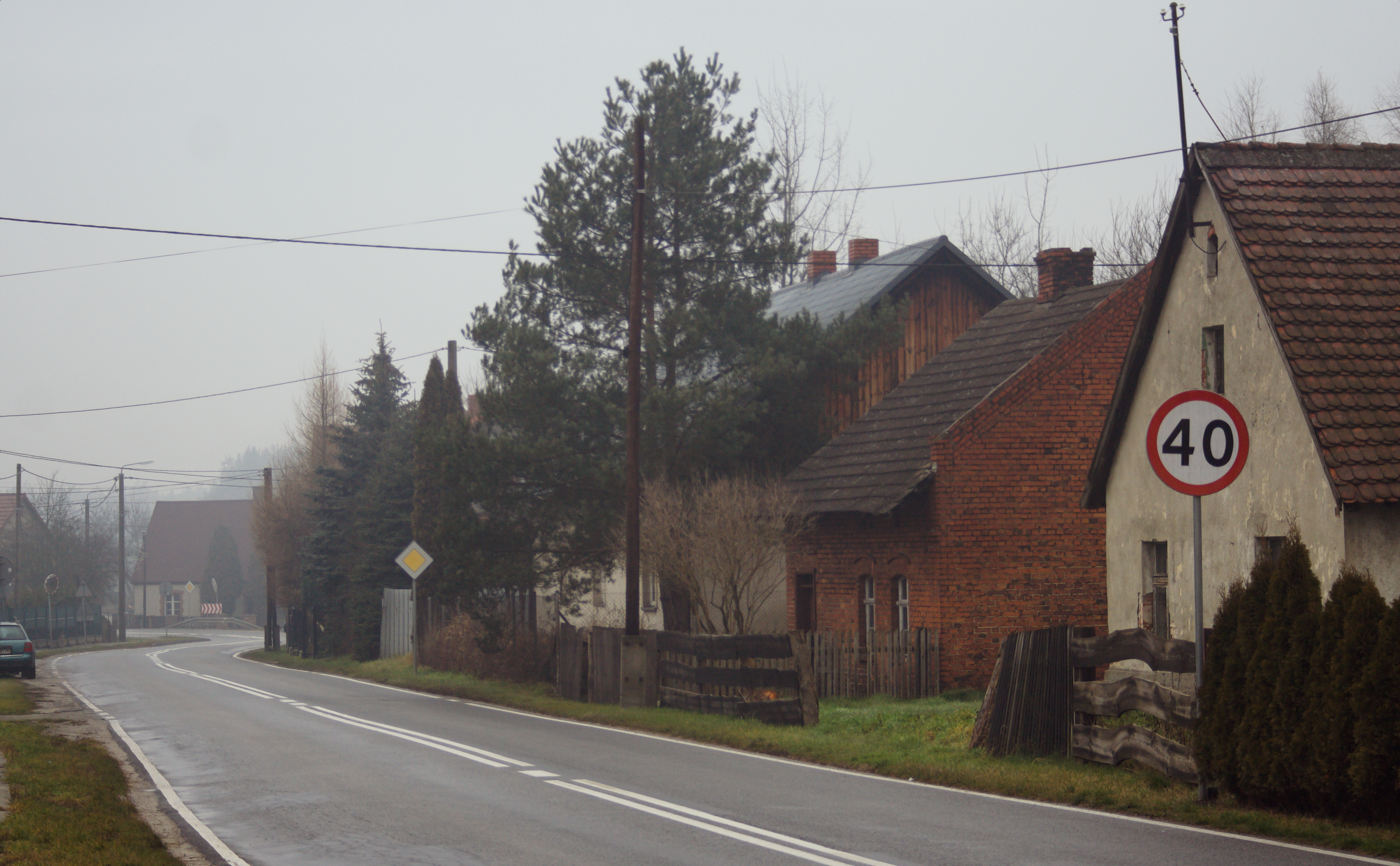

- Location within Poland
- Coordinates: 50°12′N 18°25′E
- Country: Poland
- Voivodeship: Silesian
- County: Racibórz
- Gmina: Kuźnia Raciborska

Ruda Kozielska [ˈruda kɔˈʑɛlska] is a village in the administrative district of Gmina Kuźnia Raciborska, within Racibórz County, Silesian Voivodeship, in southern Poland.
