= Siedliska, Racibórz County =

Siedliska
- Village
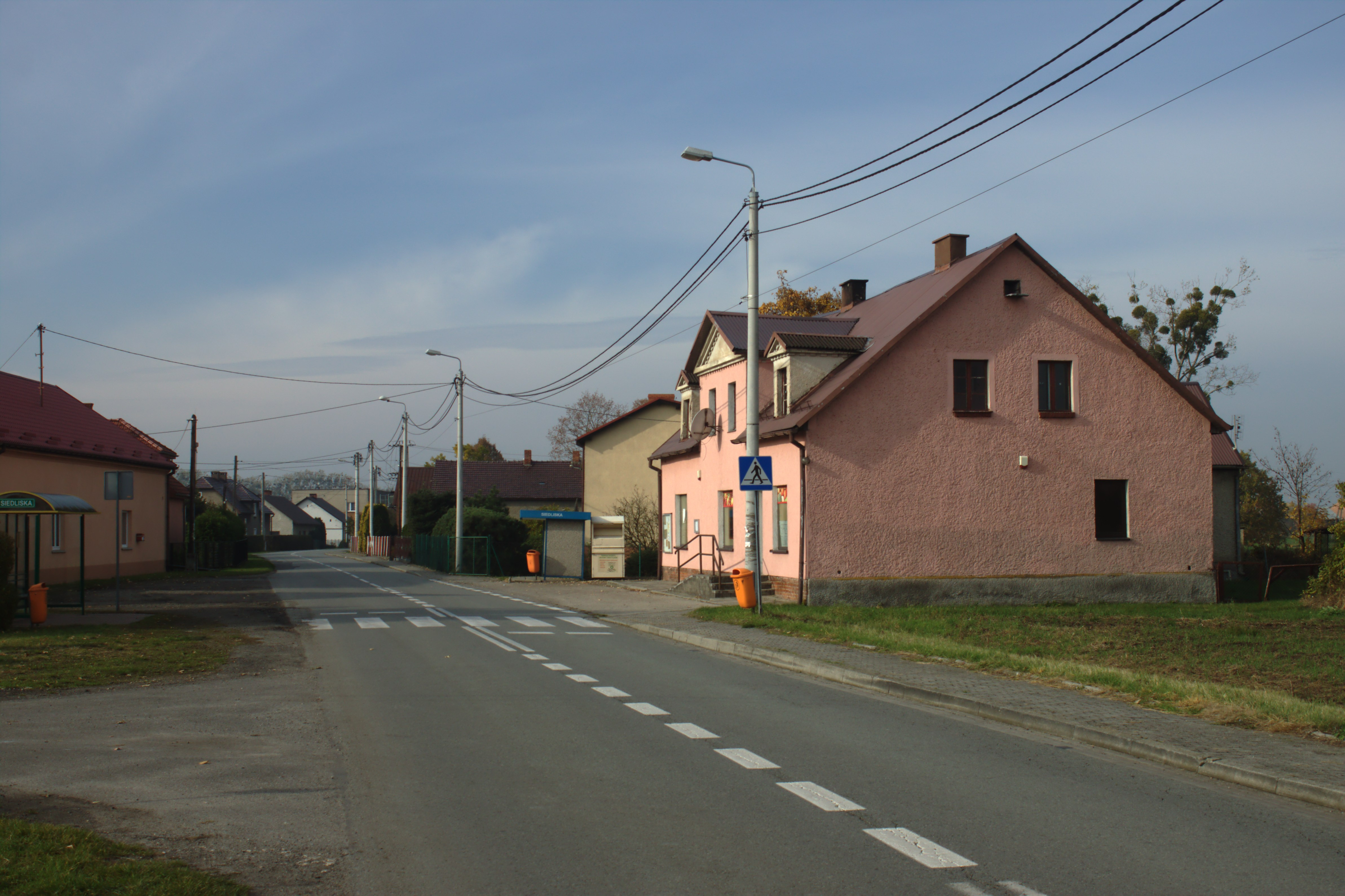
- Main road

- Location within Poland
- Coordinates: 50°11′N 18°17′E
- Country: Poland
- Voivodeship: Silesian
- County: Racibórz
- Gmina: Kuźnia Raciborska
- Population: 670

Siedliska [ɕɛdˈlʲiska] is a village in the administrative district of Gmina Kuźnia Raciborska, within Racibórz County, Silesian Voivodeship, in southern Poland.

== Gallery ==
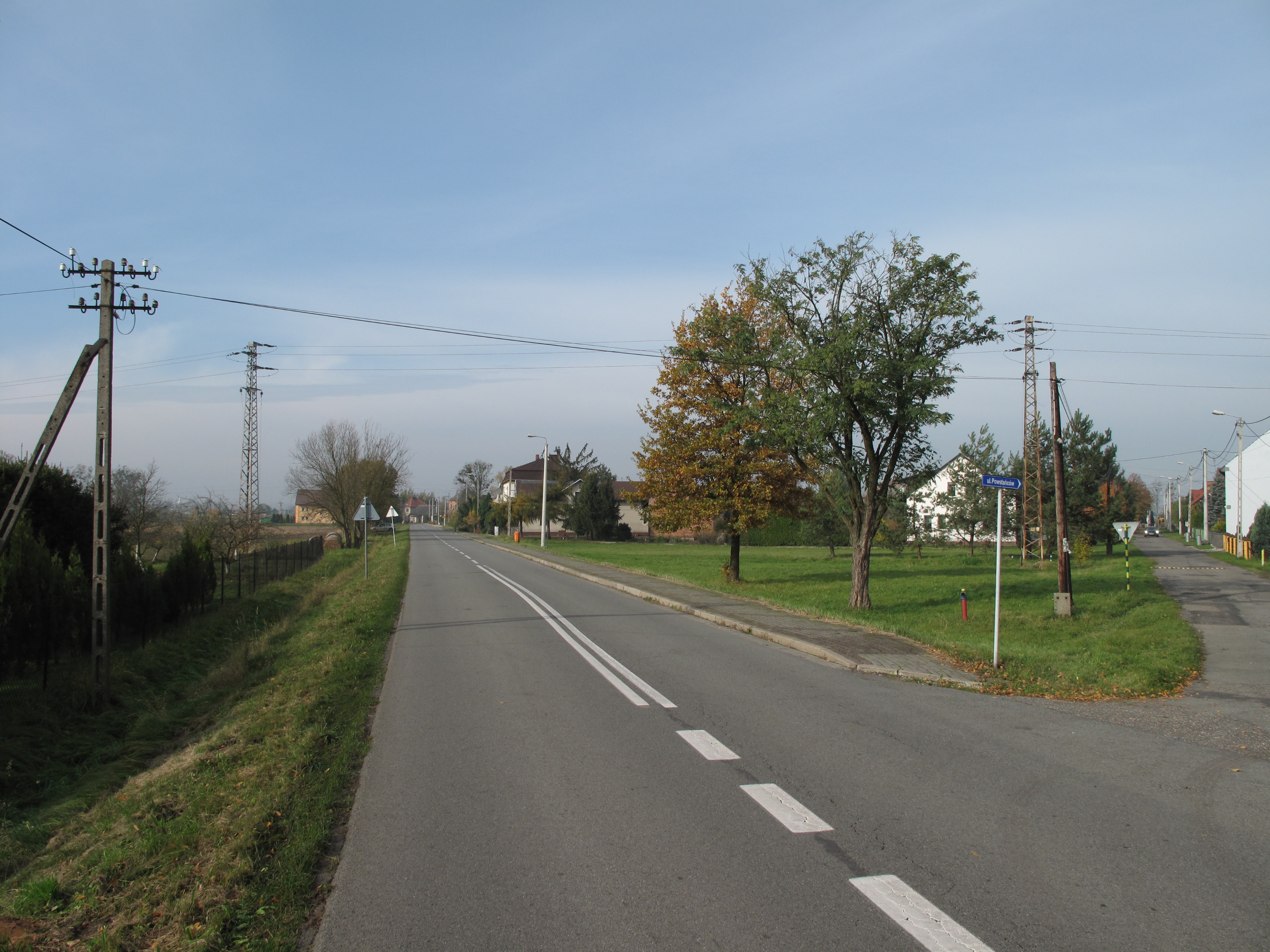
Main roa

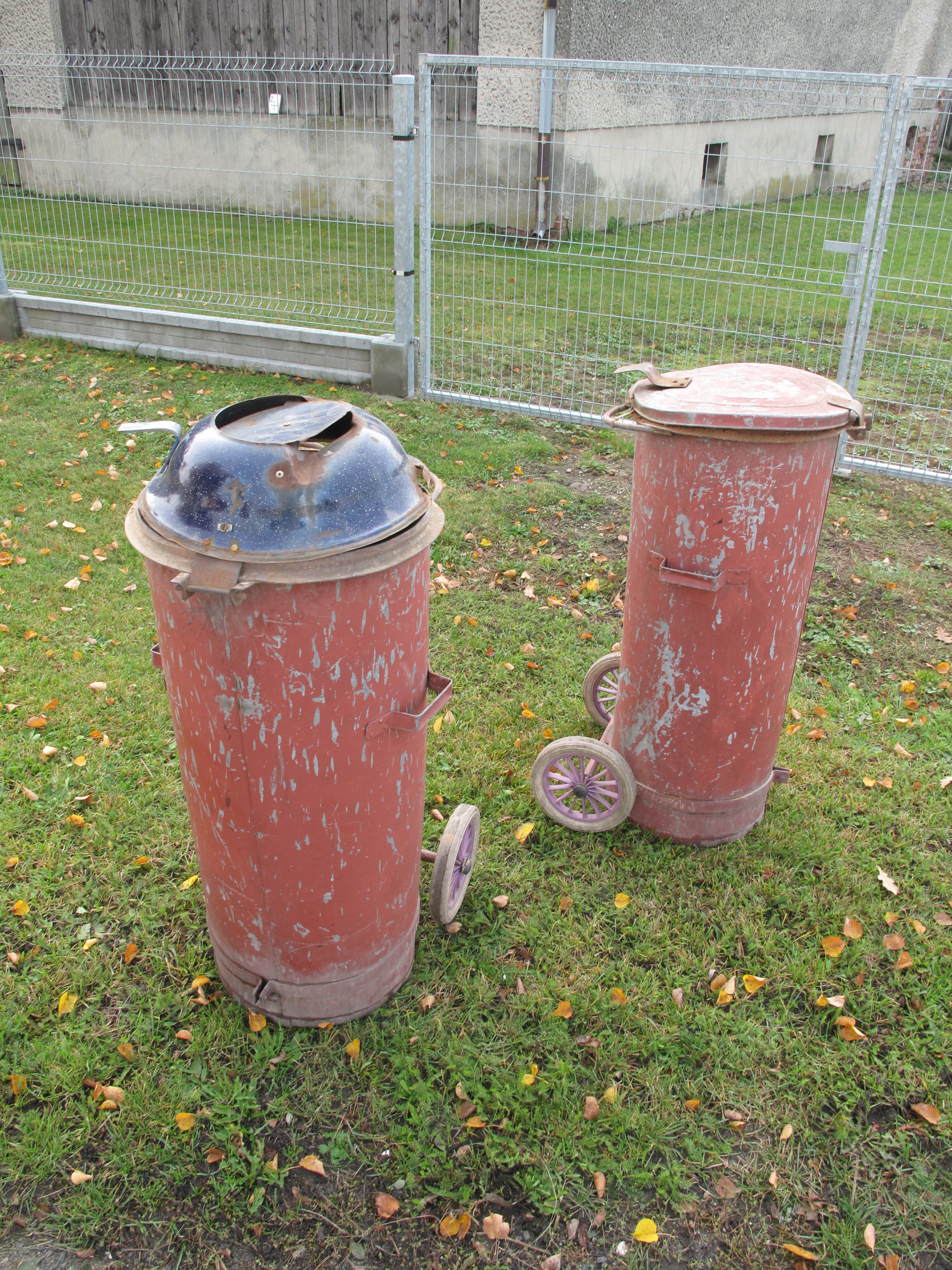
Bins

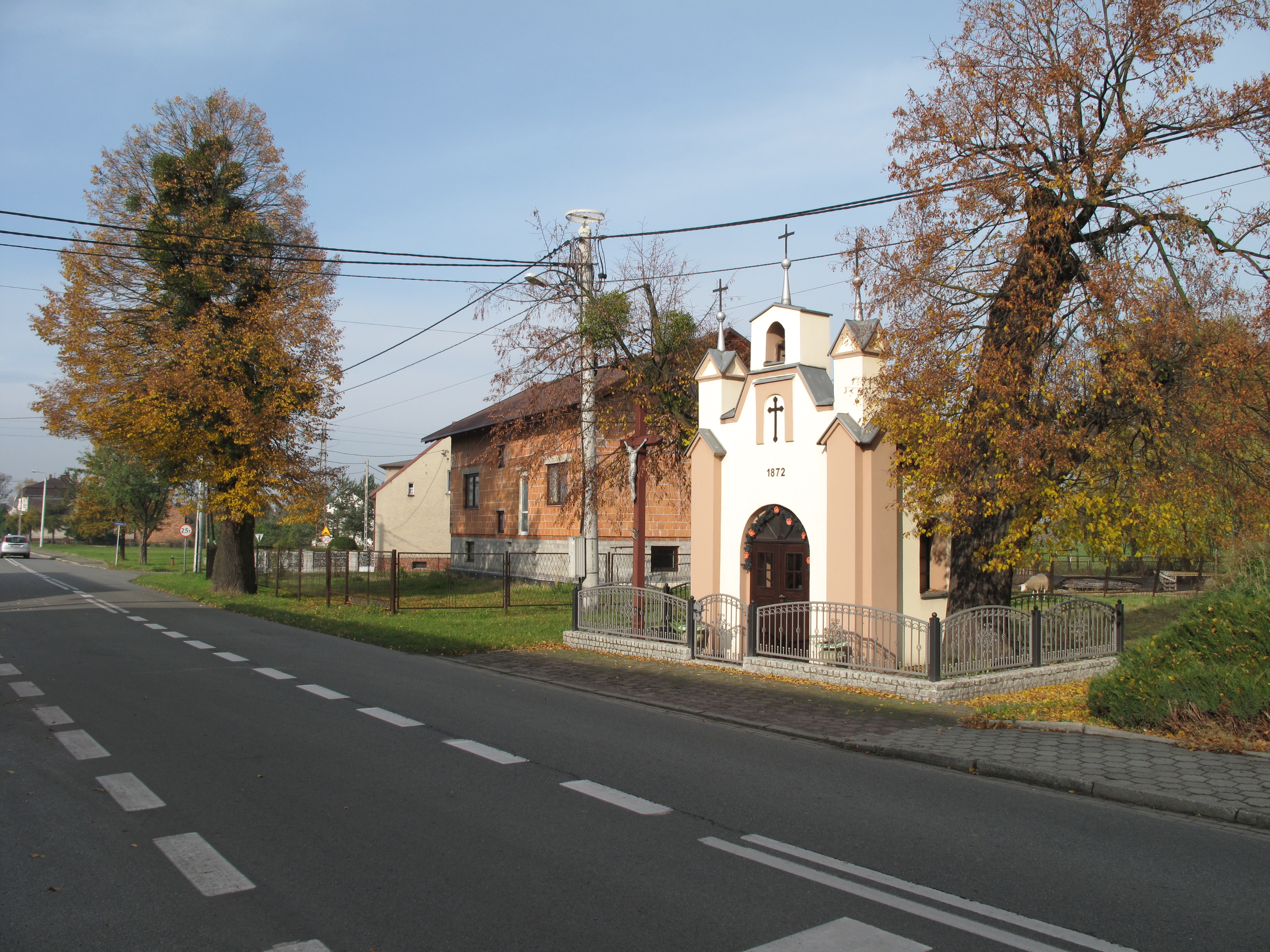
Village chapell
