= Gace Słupieckie =

- Village
- Location within Poland
- Coordinates: 50°21′57″N 21°08′52″E
- Country: Poland
- Voivodeship: Świętokrzyskie
- County: Staszów
- Gmina: Łubnice
- Sołectwo: Gace Słupieckie
- Elevation: 160 m (520 ft)

Population (31 December 2009 at Census)
  - Total: ▼215
- Time zone: UTC+1 (CET)
  - Summer (DST): UTC+2 (CEST)
- Postal code: 28-232
- Area code: +48 15
- Car plates: TSZ

Gace Słupieckie (Polish pronunciation: [ˈɡat͡sɛ swuˈpjɛt͡skʲɛ]) is a village in the administrative district of Gmina Łubnice, within Staszów County, Świętokrzyskie Voivodeship, in south-central Poland. It lies approximately 6 km (4 mi) south of Łubnice, 22 km (14 mi) south of Staszów, and 69 km (43 mi) south-east of the regional capital Kielce.
