= Ruda, Silesian Voivodeship =

Ruda
- Village
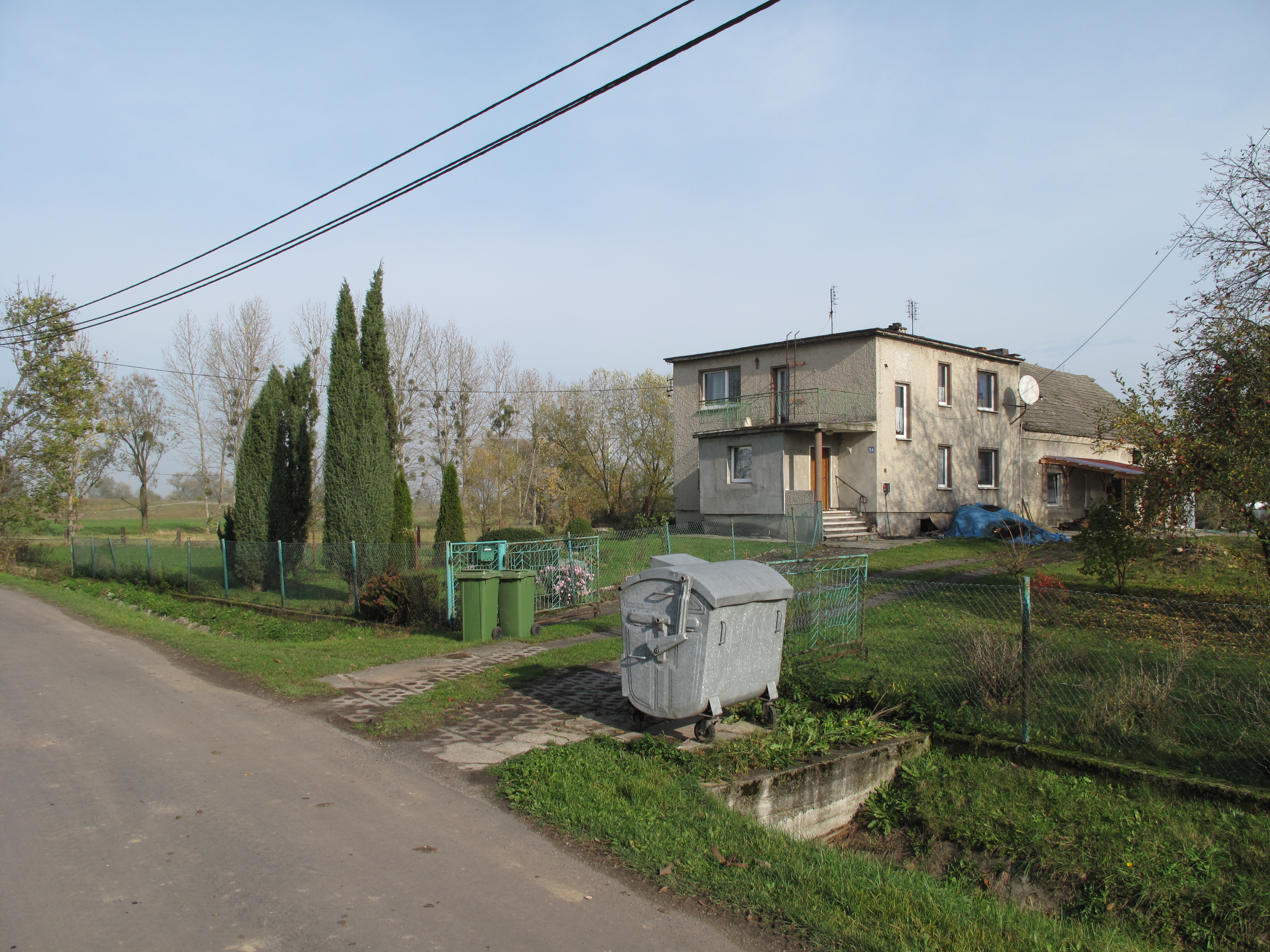
- House with garden

- Location within Poland
- Coordinates: 50°11′26″N 18°27′04″E
- Country: Poland
- Voivodeship: Silesian
- County: Racibórz
- Gmina: Kuźnia Raciborska

Ruda [ˈruda] is a village in the administrative district of Gmina Kuźnia Raciborska, within Racibórz County, Silesian Voivodeship, in southern Poland.

== Gallery ==
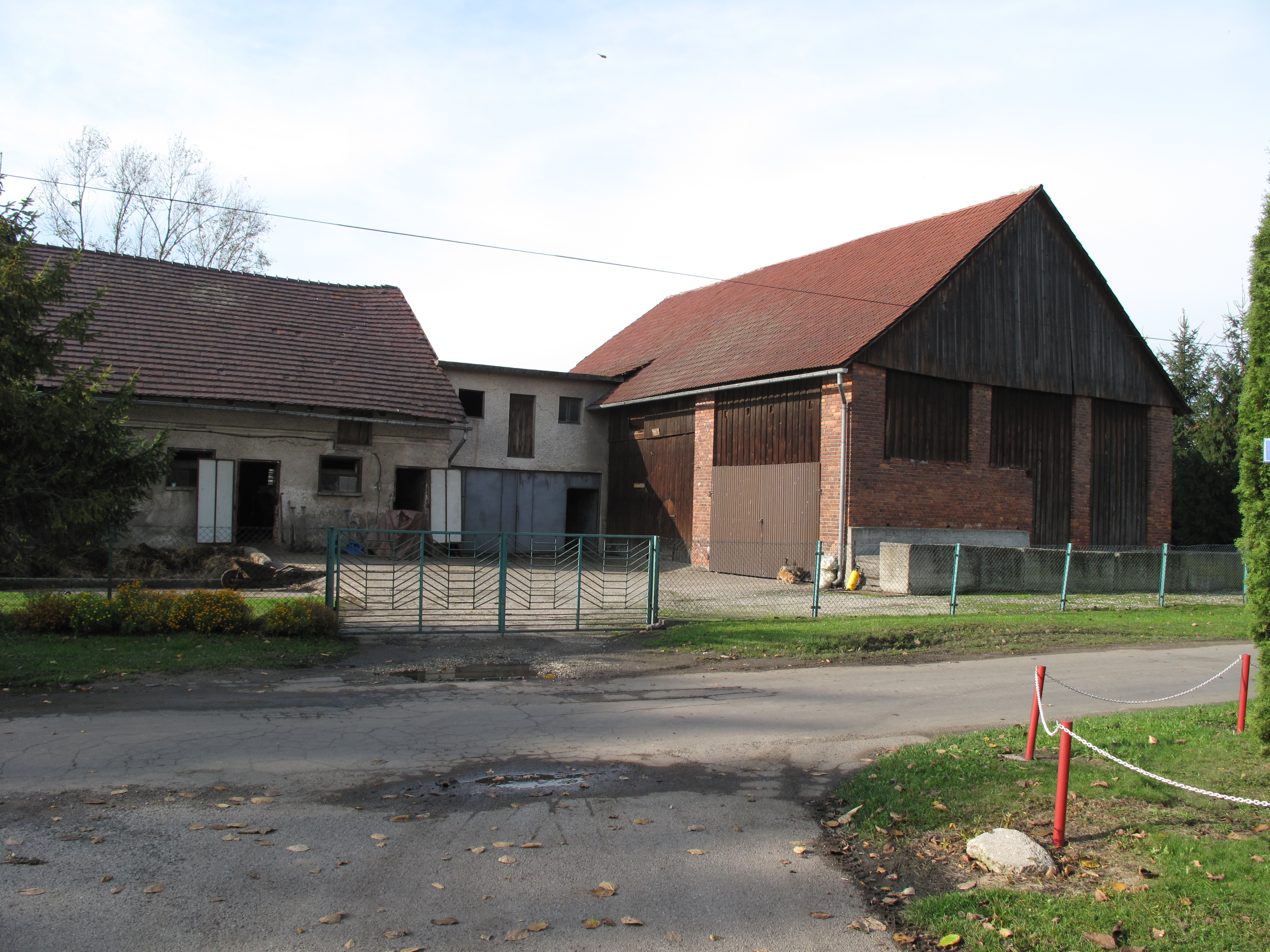
Farm

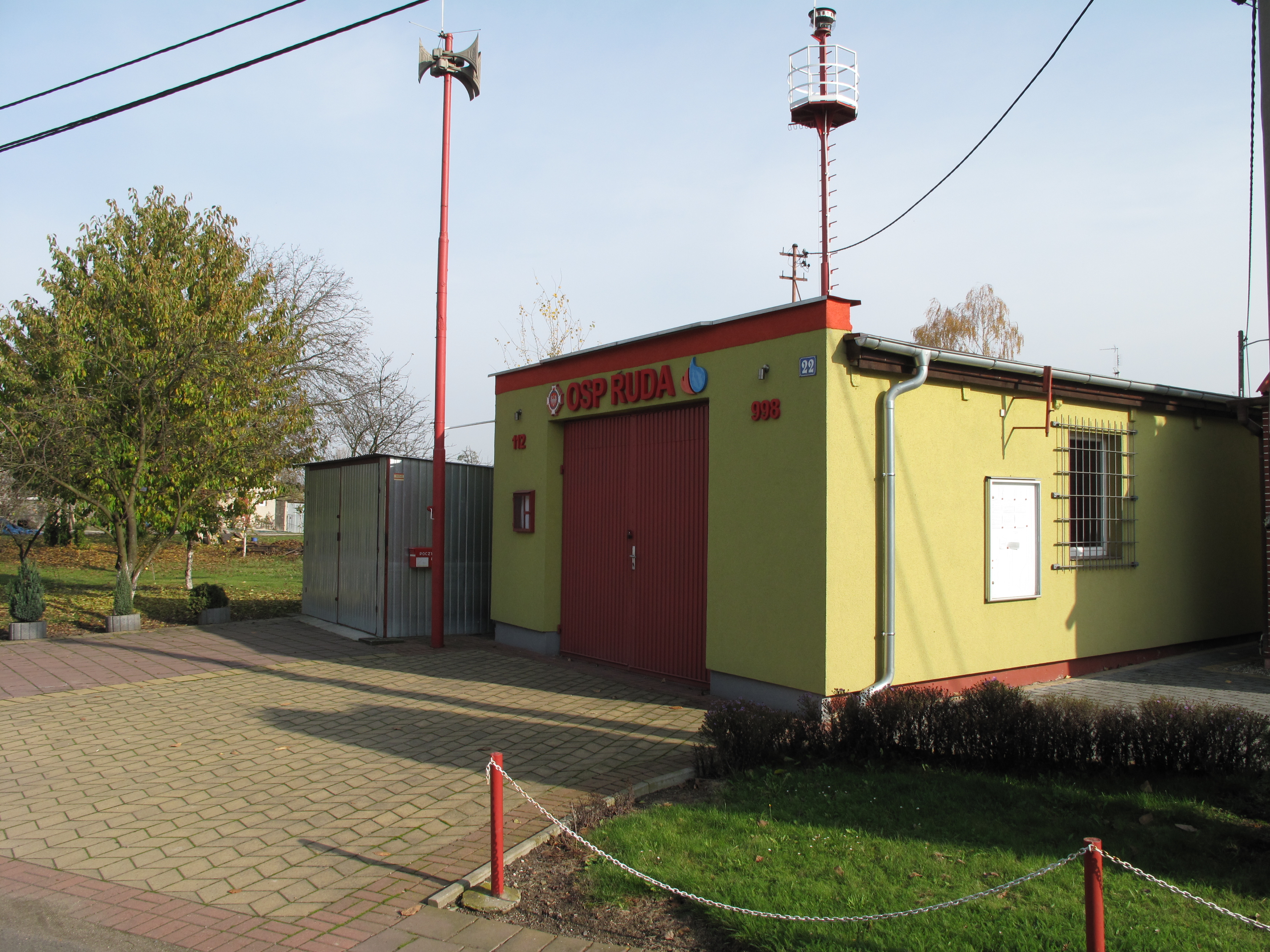
Fire department station

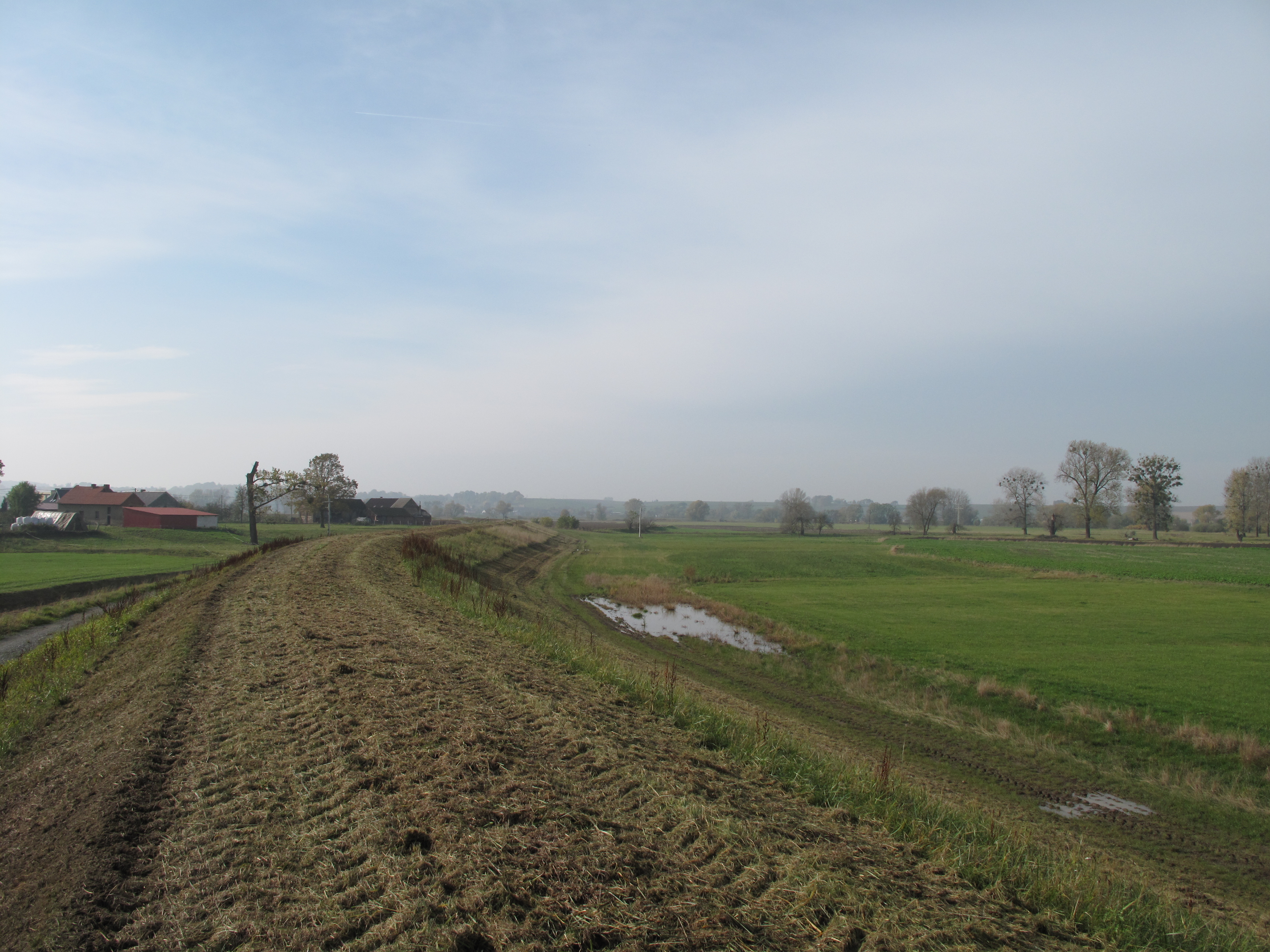
Dam
