= Szczebrzusz =

- Village
- Location within Poland
- Coordinates: 50°21′55″N 21°10′06″E
- Country: Poland
- Voivodeship: Świętokrzyskie
- County: Staszów
- Gmina: Łubnice
- Sołectwo: Szczebrzusz
- Elevation: 159.9 m (525 ft)

Population (31 December 2009 at Census)
  - Total: ▲145
- Time zone: UTC+1 (CET)
  - Summer (DST): UTC+2 (CEST)
- Postal code: 28-232
- Area code: +48 15
- Car plates: TSZ

Szczebrzusz [ˈʂt͡ʂɛbʐuʂ] is a village in the administrative district of Gmina Łubnice, within Staszów County, Świętokrzyskie Voivodeship, in south-central Poland. It lies approximately 4 km (2 mi) south of Łubnice, 20 km (12 mi) south of Staszów, and 68 km (42 mi) south-east of the regional capital Kielce.
