= Gmina Łubnice, Świętokrzyskie Voivodeship =

Gmina Łubnice Łubnice Commune
- Gmina
- Coat of arms

- Coordinates (Łubnice): 50°23′51.09″N 21°10′08.48″E
- Country: Poland
- Voivodeship: Świętokrzyskie
- County: Staszów
- Seat: Łubnice

Area (through the years 2006–2010)
  - Total: 84.14 km^{2} (32.49 sq mi)

Population (31 December 2010 at Census)
  - Total: 4,382
  - Density: 52.08/km^{2} (134.9/sq mi)
- Time zone: UTC+1 (CET)
  - Summer (DST): UTC+2 (CEST)
- Postal code: 28-232
- Area code: +48 15
- Car plates: TSZ
- Website: http://free.polbox.pl/l/lubnice/lubnice/

Gmina Łubnice is a rural gmina (administrative district) in Staszów County, Świętokrzyskie Voivodeship, in south-central Poland. Its seat is the village of Łubnice, which lies approximately 17 kilometres (11 mi) south of Staszów and 65 km (40 mi) south-east of the regional capital Kielce.

The gmina covers an area of 84.14 square kilometres (32.5 sq mi), and as of 2010 its total population is ▲4,382.

== Demography ==
According to the 2011 Poland census, there were 4,382 people residing in Łubnice Commune, of whom 48.6% were male and 51.4% were female. In the commune, the population was spread out, with 19.2% under the age of 18, 37.8% from 18 to 44, 21.5% from 45 to 64, and 21.5% who were 65 years of age or older.

Table 1. Population level of commune in 2010 – by age group
| SPECIFICATION | | | | | Measure unit | POPULATION (by age group in 2010) | | | | | | | | | | | | | | | | | | |
| SPECIFICATION | | | | | Measure unit | TOTAL | 0–4 | 5–9 | 10–14 | 15–19 | 20–24 | 25–29 | 30–34 | 35–39 | 40–44 | 45–49 | 50–54 | 55–59 | 60–64 | 65–69 | 70–74 | 75–79 | 80–84 | 85 + |
|---|---|---|---|---|---|---|---|---|---|---|---|---|---|---|---|---|---|---|---|---|---|---|---|---|
| I. | TOTAL | | | | person | 4,382 | 215 | 200 | 254 | 307 | 339 | 360 | 297 | 260 | 267 | 274 | 279 | 280 | 232 | 159 | 198 | 202 | 141 | 118 |
| I. | — | of which in | | | % | 100 | 4.9 | 4.6 | 5.8 | 7 | 7.7 | 8.2 | 6.8 | 5.9 | 6.1 | 6.3 | 6.4 | 6.4 | 5.3 | 3.6 | 4.5 | 4.6 | 3.2 | 2.7 |
| I. | 1. | BY SEX | | | | | | | | | | | | | | | | | | | | | | |
| I. | 1. | A. | Males | | person | 2,131 | 107 | 102 | 121 | 162 | 189 | 176 | 160 | 129 | 131 | 138 | 158 | 150 | 110 | 71 | 67 | 80 | 43 | 37 |
| I. | 1. | A. | — | of which in | % | 48.6 | 2.4 | 2.3 | 2.8 | 3.7 | 4.3 | 4 | 3.7 | 2.9 | 3 | 3.1 | 3.6 | 3.4 | 2.5 | 1.6 | 1.5 | 1.8 | 1 | 0.8 |
| I. | 1. | B. | Females | | person | 2,251 | 108 | 98 | 133 | 145 | 150 | 184 | 137 | 131 | 136 | 136 | 121 | 130 | 122 | 88 | 131 | 122 | 98 | 81 |
| I. | 1. | B. | — | of which in | % | 51.4 | 2.5 | 2.2 | 3 | 3.3 | 3.4 | 4.2 | 3.1 | 3 | 3.1 | 3.1 | 2.8 | 3 | 2.8 | 2 | 3 | 2.8 | 2.2 | 1.8 |

Figure 1. Population pyramid of commune in 2010 – by age group and sex

Table 2. Population level of commune in 2010 – by sex
| SPECIFICATION | | | | | | Measure unit | POPULATION (by sex in 2010) | | |
| SPECIFICATION | | | | | | Measure unit | TOTAL | Males | Females |
|---|---|---|---|---|---|---|---|---|---|
| I. | TOTAL | | | | | person | 4,382 | 2,131 | 2,251 |
| I. | — | of which in | | | | % | 100 | 48.6 | 51.4 |
| I. | 1. | BY AGE GROUP | | | | | | | |
| I. | 1. | A. | At pre-working age | | | person | 843 | 407 | 436 |
| I. | 1. | A. | — | of which in | | % | 19.2 | 9.3 | 9.9 |
| I. | 1. | B. | At working age. grand total | | | person | 2,599 | 1,426 | 1,173 |
| I. | 1. | B. | — | of which in | | % | 59.3 | 32.5 | 26.8 |
| I. | 1. | B. | a. | at mobile working age | | person | 1,656 | 870 | 786 |
| I. | 1. | B. | a. | — | of which in | % | 37.8 | 19.9 | 17.9 |
| I. | 1. | B. | b. | at non-mobile working age | | person | 943 | 556 | 387 |
| I. | 1. | B. | b. | — | of which in | % | 21.5 | 12.7 | 8.8 |
| I. | 1. | C. | At post-working age | | | person | 940 | 298 | 642 |
| I. | 1. | C. | — | of which in | | % | 21.5 | 6.8 | 14.7 |

== Villages ==
Gmina Łubnice contains the villages and settlements of Beszowa, Borki, Budziska, Czarzyzna, Gace Słupieckie, Góra, Grabowa, Łubnice, Łyczba, Orzelec Duży, Orzelec Mały, Przeczów, Rejterówka, Słupiec, Szczebrzusz, Wilkowa, Wolica, Zalesie and Zofiówka.

== Neighbouring gminas ==
Gmina Łubnice is bordered by the gminas of Czermin, Oleśnica, Pacanów, Połaniec, Rytwiany and Szczucin.
