= Kuźnia Raciborska =

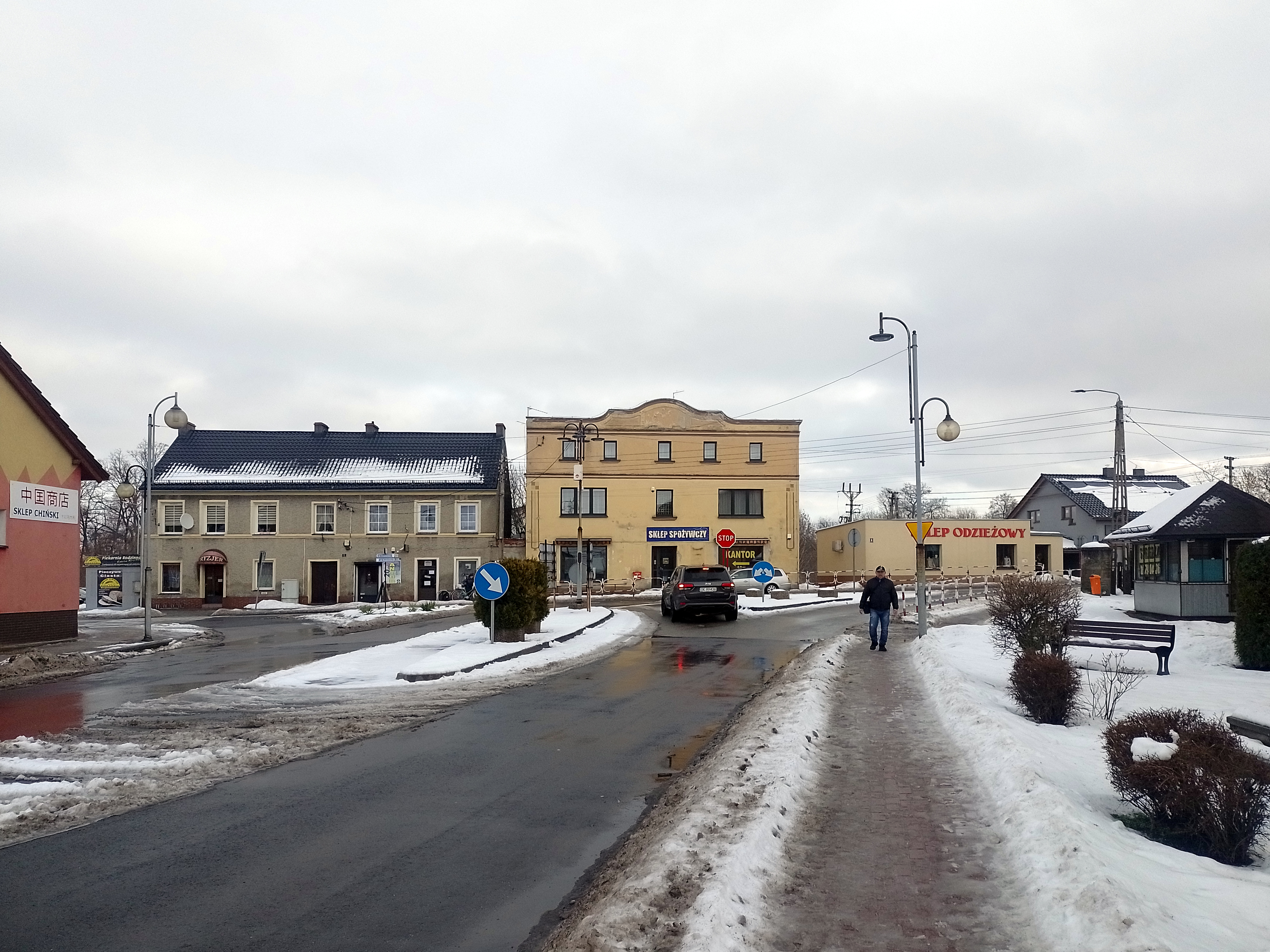
- Town centre

- Flag Coat of arms

- Location within Poland
- Coordinates: 50°13′N 18°18′E
- Country: Poland
- Voivodeship: Silesian
- County: Racibórz
- Gmina: Kuźnia Raciborska
- Founded: 1641

Government
  - Mayor: Wojciech Gdesz

Area
  - Total: 31.75 km^{2} (12.26 sq mi)

Population (2019-06-30)
  - Total: 5,359
  - Density: 168.8/km^{2} (437.2/sq mi)
- Time zone: UTC+1 (CET)
  - Summer (DST): UTC+2 (CEST)
- Postal code: 47-420
- Vehicle registration: SRC
- Website: https://kuzniaraciborska.pl/

Kuźnia Raciborska [ˈkuʑɲa rat͡ɕiˈbɔrska] (German: Ratiborhammer) is a town in Racibórz County, Silesian Voivodeship, in southern Poland, with 5,359 inhabitants (2019). It is situated on the Ruda River.

== History ==
The settlement was founded in 1641.

During World War II, it was the location of a German-operated forced labour subcamp of the Nazi prison in Racibórz.

The Polish 11th Air Defence Missile Squadron was stationed in the town from 1962 to 1990.

== Twin towns – sister cities ==
See twin towns of Gmina Kuźnia Raciborska.
