= Budziska, Świętokrzyskie Voivodeship =

Budziska
- Village
- Location within Poland
- Coordinates: 50°23′18″N 21°13′07″E
- Country: Poland
- Voivodeship: Świętokrzyskie
- County: Staszów
- Gmina: Łubnice
- Sołectwo: Budziska
- Elevation: 158.5 m (520 ft)

Population (31 December 2009 at Census)
  - Total: ▲462
- Time zone: UTC+1 (CET)
  - Summer (DST): UTC+2 (CEST)
- Postal code: 28-232
- Area code: +48 15
- Car plates: TSZ

Budziska [buˈd͡ʑiska] is a village in the administrative district of Gmina Łubnice, within Staszów County, Świętokrzyskie Voivodeship, in south-central Poland. It lies approximately 7 km (4 mi) south-east of Łubnice, 21 km (13 mi) south of Staszów, and 71 km (44 mi) south-east of the regional capital Kielce.
