= Rudy, Silesian Voivodeship =

Rudy
- Village
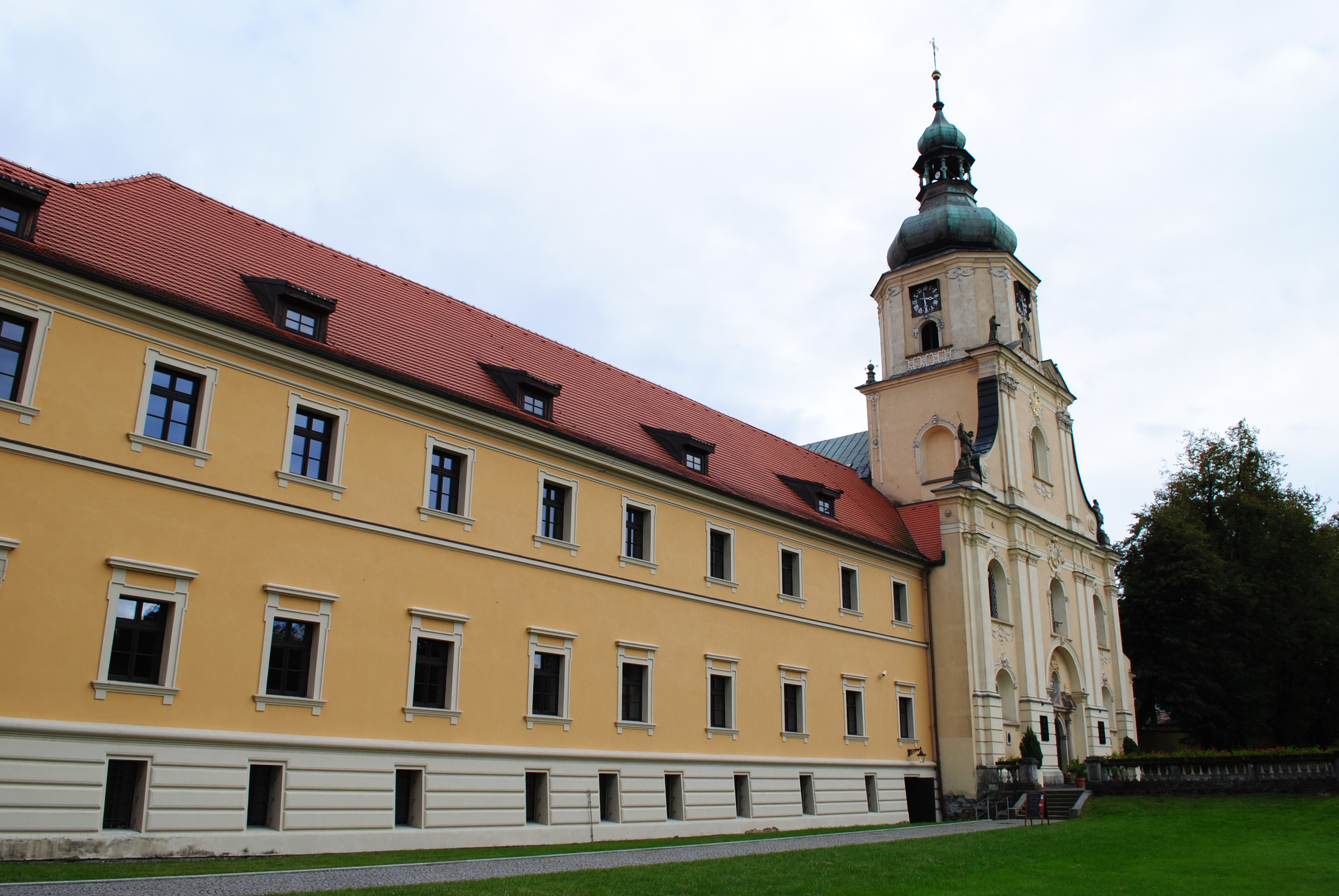
- Our Lady Basilica and monastery in Rudy

- Location within Poland
- Coordinates: 50°11′N 18°27′E
- Country: Poland
- Voivodeship: Silesian
- County: Racibórz
- Gmina: Kuźnia Raciborska
- Established: 13th century
- Population: 2,800
- Time zone: UTC+1 (CET)
  - Summer (DST): UTC+2 (CEST)
- Vehicle registration: SRC

Rudy ([ˈrudɨ], also known as Rudy Wielkie or Rudy Raciborskie) is a village in the administrative district of Gmina Kuźnia Raciborska, within Racibórz County, Silesian Voivodeship, in southern Poland.

With history going back to the 13th century, it is a site of the gothic Cistercian Rudy Palace-Monastery. There is also a narrow gauge railway station and museum in the village.

Rudy gives its name to the protected area called Rudy Landscape Park (in full: "Landscape Park of the Cistercian Landscape Compositions of Rudy Wielkie").

== History ==
In the early 13th century a monastery was founded at the site, however, it was destroyed in the First Mongol invasion of Poland in 1241. The Cistercians rebuilt the monastery in 1252–1255. A foundation document was issued by Duke Władysław Opolski of the Polish Piast dynasty in 1258, and it was confirmed by Pope Gregory X in 1274. The Cistercians developed the village. In the early 14th century, Duke Przemysław of Racibórz funded the construction of a new church (present-day Basilica) in Rudy.

During World War II, the Germans established and operated three forced labour subcamps (E374, E588, E742) of the Stalag VIII-B/344 prisoner-of-war camp in the village. In the final stages of the war, in 1945, a German-conducted death march of prisoners of a subcamp of the Auschwitz concentration camp in Sosnowiec passed through the village towards Opava.

== Sports ==
The local football team is LKS Buk Rudy. It competes in the lower leagues.

== Notable people ==
- Viktor II (1847–1923), Duke of Ratibor
- Viktor III (1879–1945), Duke of Ratibor

== Gallery ==
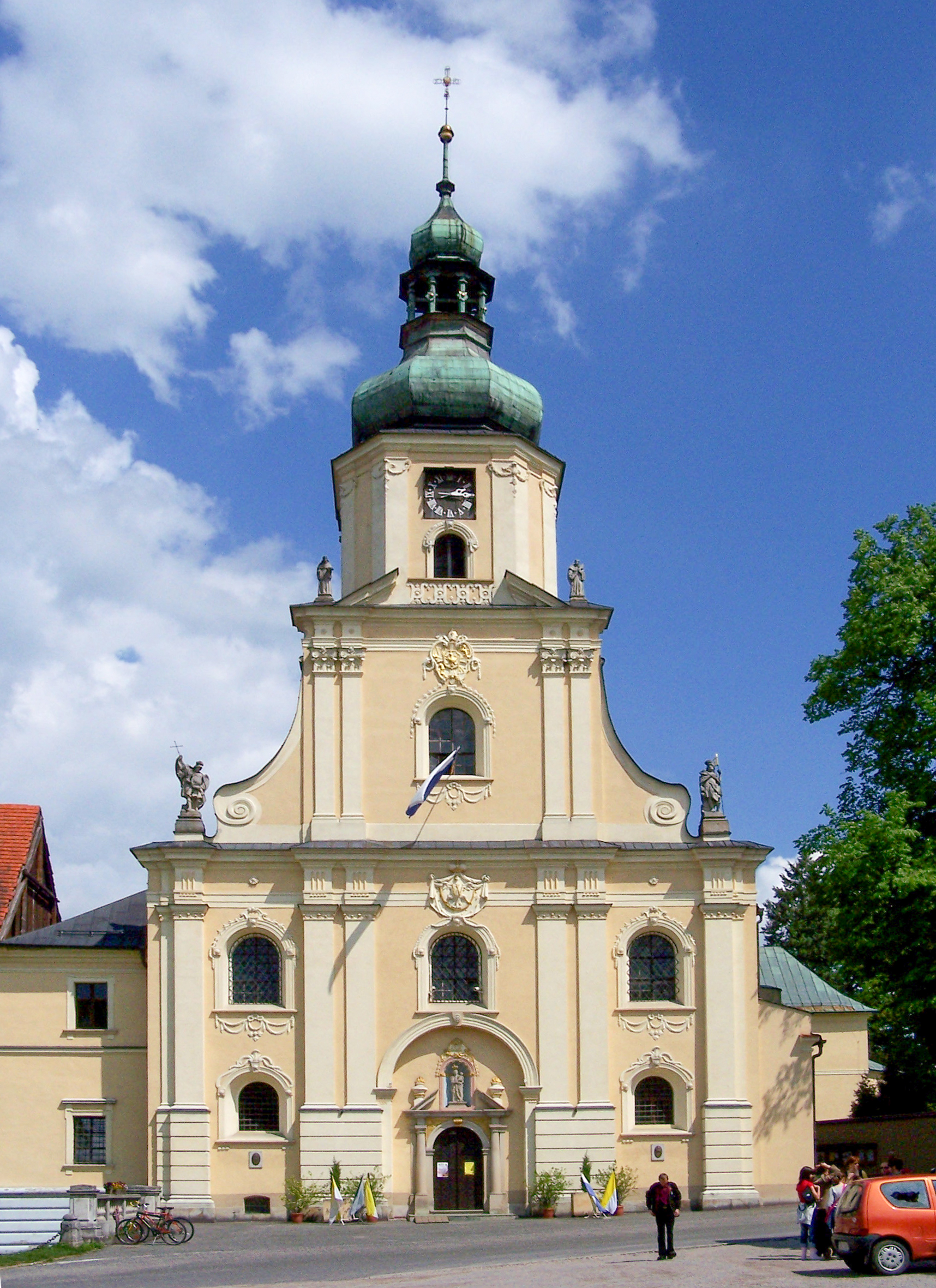
Our Lady Basilica

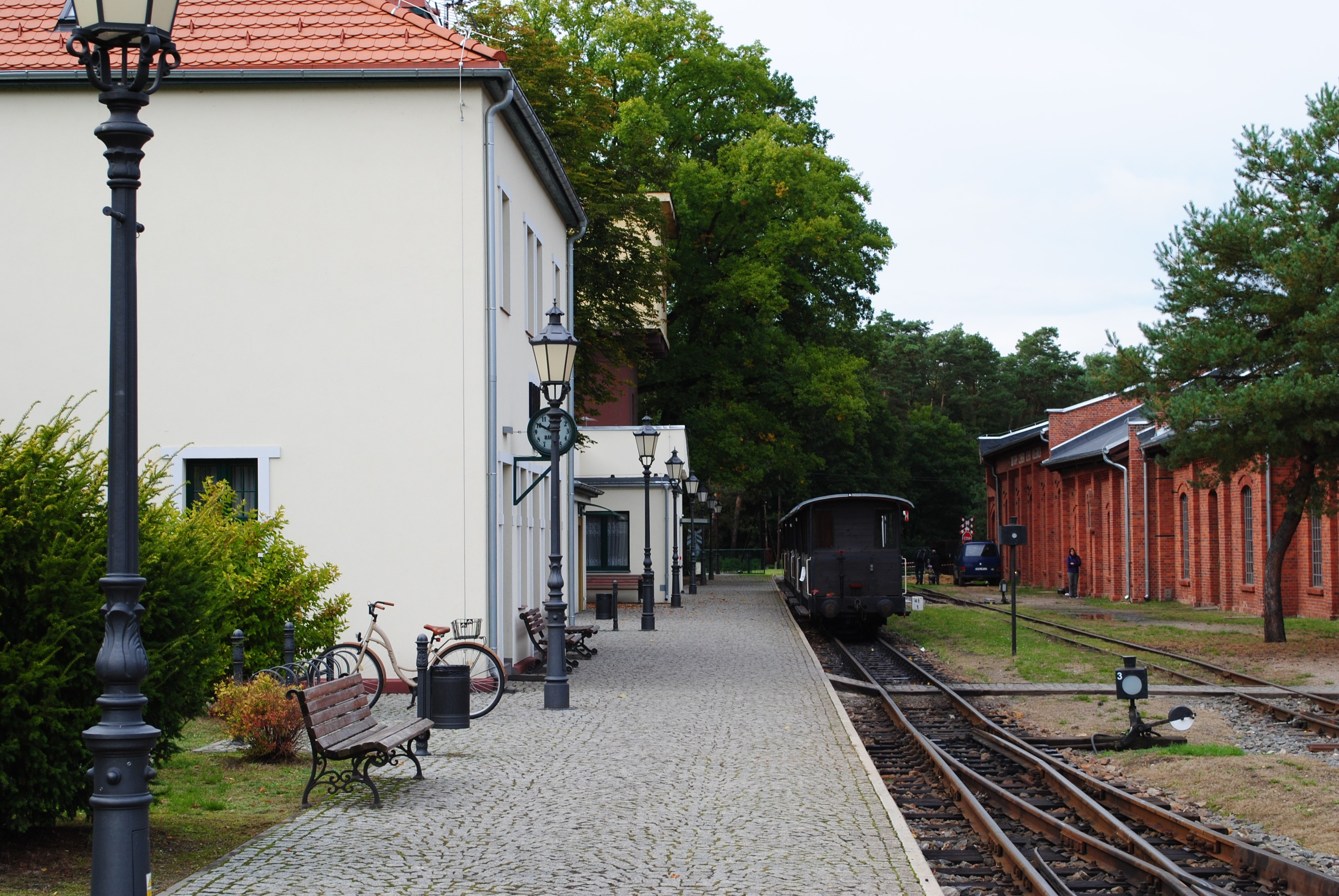
Narrow gauge railway station and museum

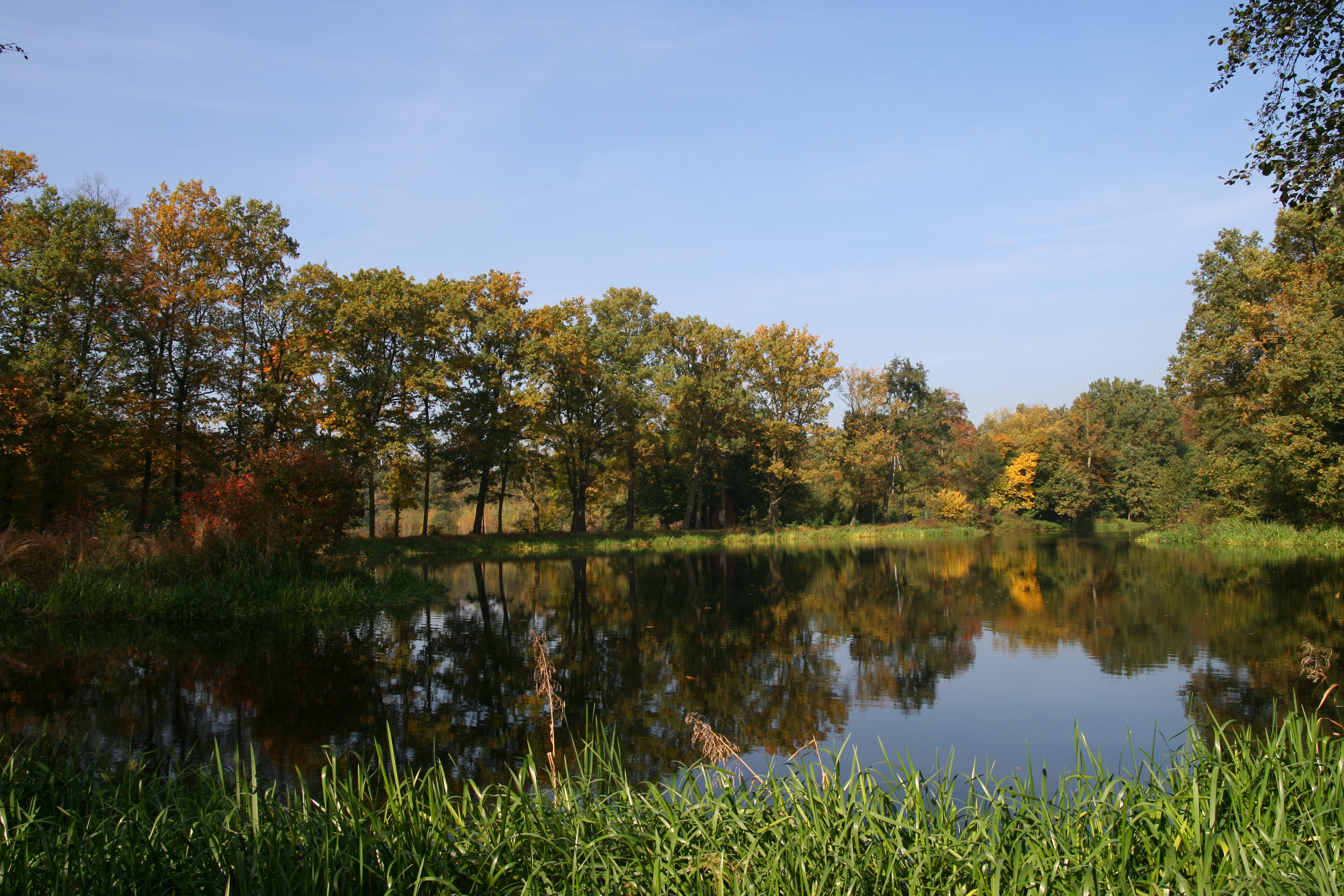
Park

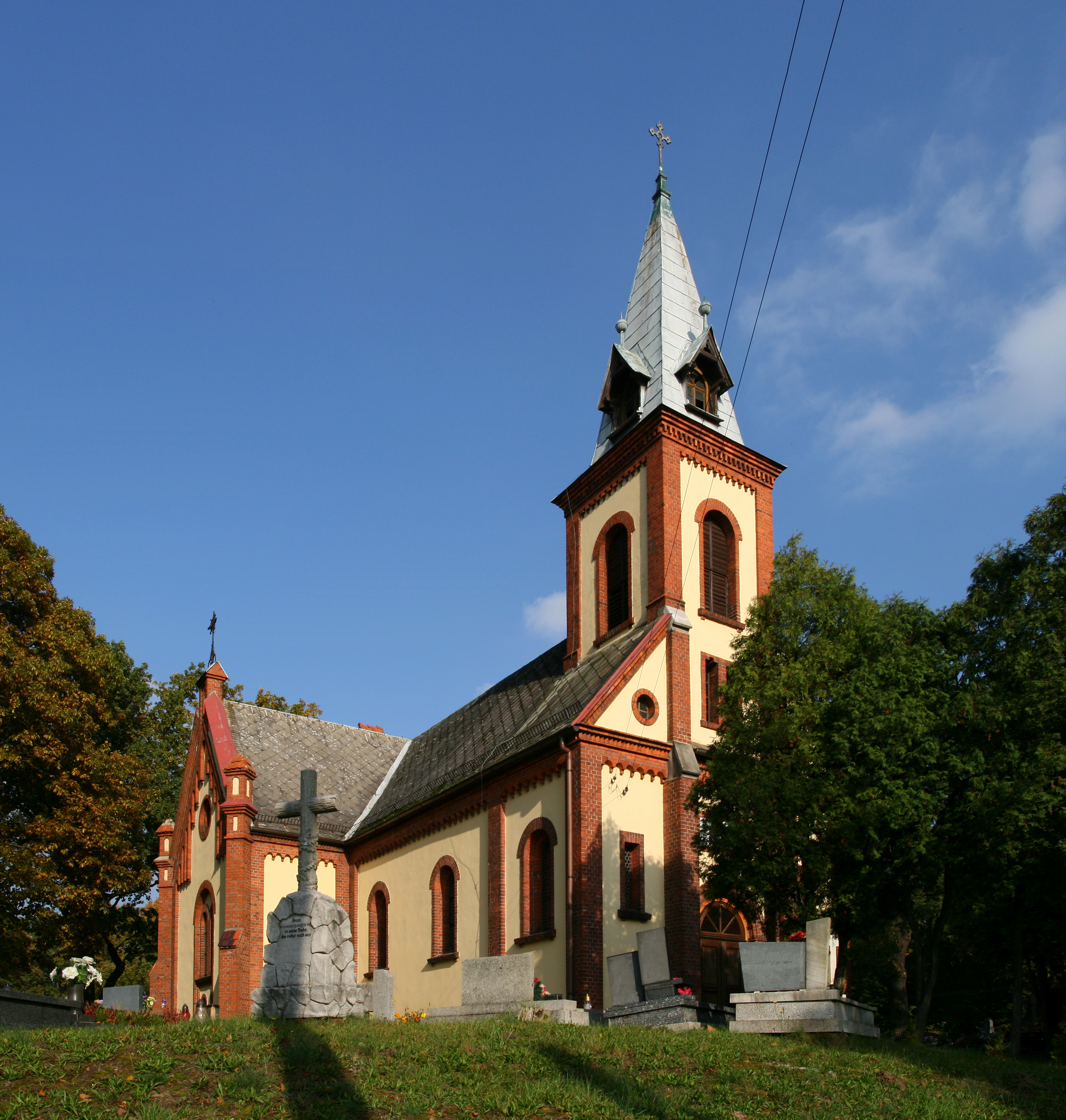
St. Mary Magdalene Church
