= Gmina Kuźnia Raciborska =

Gmina Kuźnia Raciborska Kuźnia Raciborska Commune
- Gmina
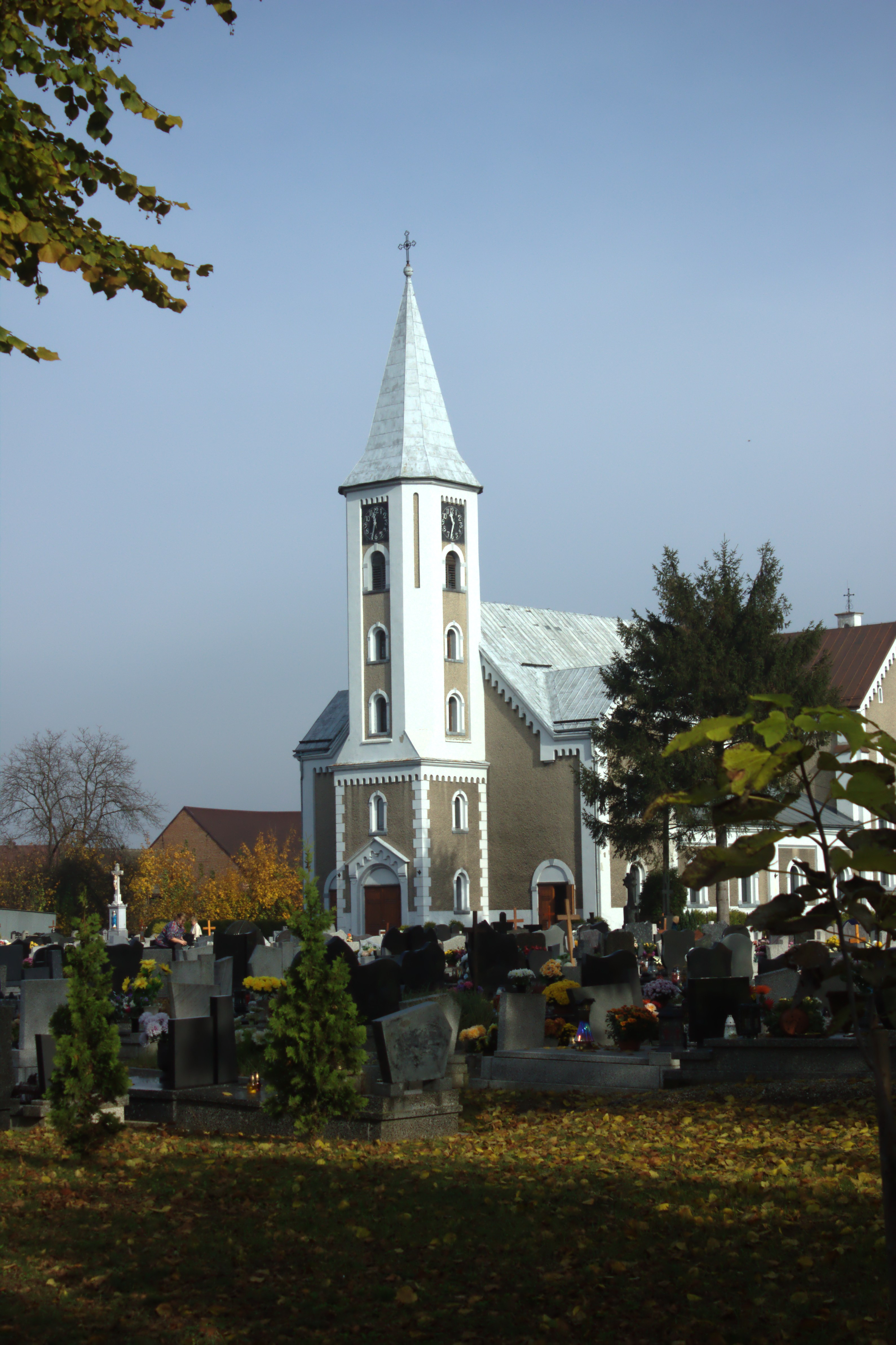
- Church in Turze

- Flag Coat of arms
- Interactive map of Gmina Kuźnia Raciborska
- Coordinates (Kuźnia Raciborska): 50°13′N 18°18′E
- Country: Poland
- Voivodeship: Silesian
- County: Racibórz
- Seat: Kuźnia Raciborska

Area
  - Total: 126.84 km^{2} (48.97 sq mi)

Population (2019-06-30)
  - Total: 11,851
  - Density: 93.433/km^{2} (241.99/sq mi)
  - Urban: 5,359
  - Rural: 6,492
- Website: https://kuzniaraciborska.pl/

Gmina Kuźnia Raciborska is an urban-rural gmina (administrative district) in Racibórz County, Silesian Voivodeship, in southern Poland. Its seat is the town of Kuźnia Raciborska, which lies approximately 16 kilometres (10 mi) north of Racibórz and 50 km (31 mi) west of the regional capital Katowice.

The gmina covers an area of 126.84 square kilometres (49.0 sq mi), and as of 2019, its total population was 11,851.

== Villages ==
Apart from the town of Kuźnia Raciborska, Gmina Kuźnia Raciborska contains the villages and settlements of Budziska, Jankowice, Ruda, Ruda Kozielska, Rudy, Siedliska and Turze.

== Neighbouring gminas ==
Gmina Kuźnia Raciborska is bordered by the city of Rybnik and by the gminas of Bierawa, Cisek, Lyski, Nędza, Pilchowice, Rudnik and Sośnicowice.

== Twin towns – sister cities ==
Gmina Kuźnia Raciborska is twinned with:

- Kelheim, Germany
- Odry, Czech Republic

== Gallery ==
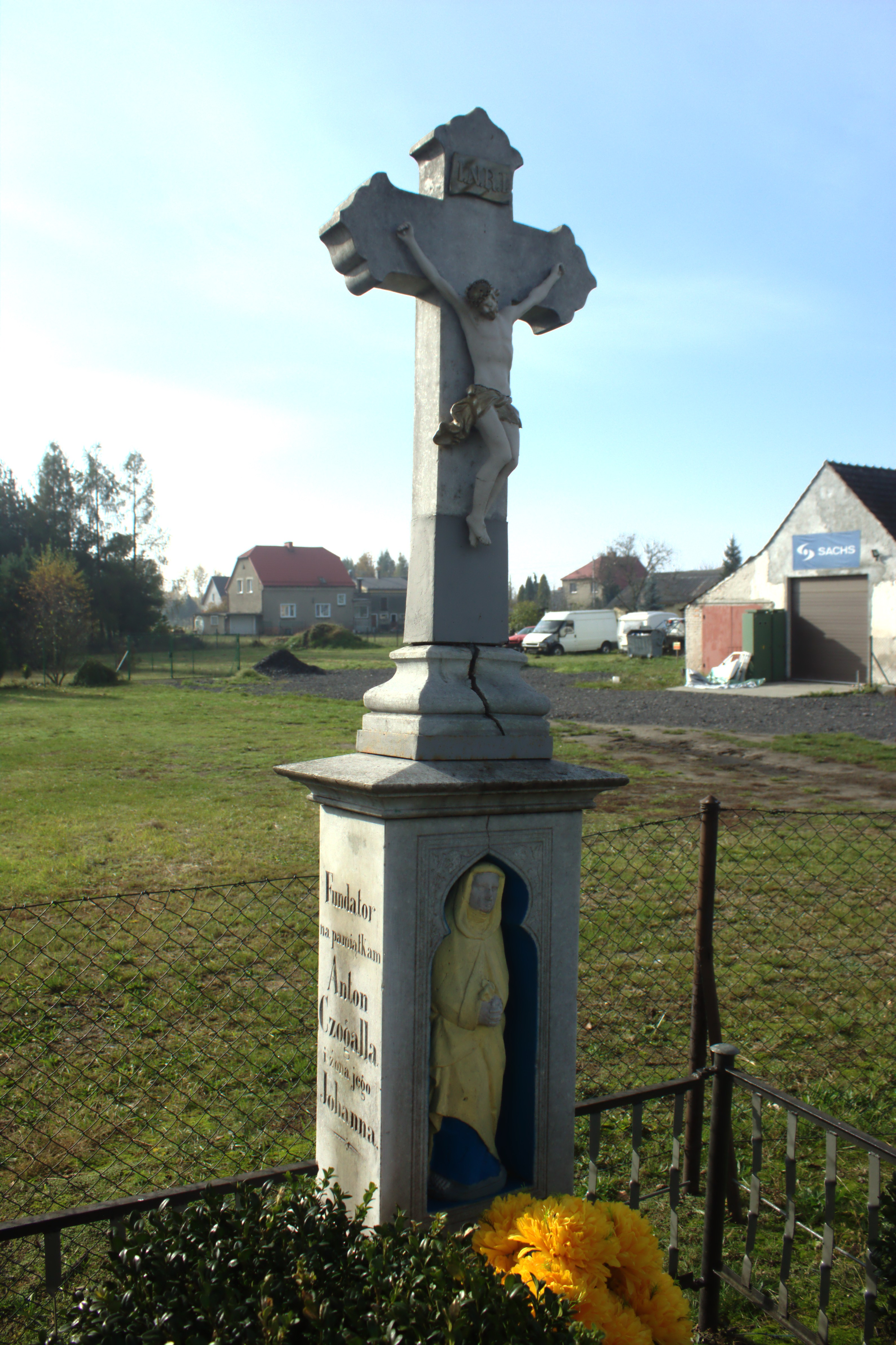
Wayside shrine in Siedliska

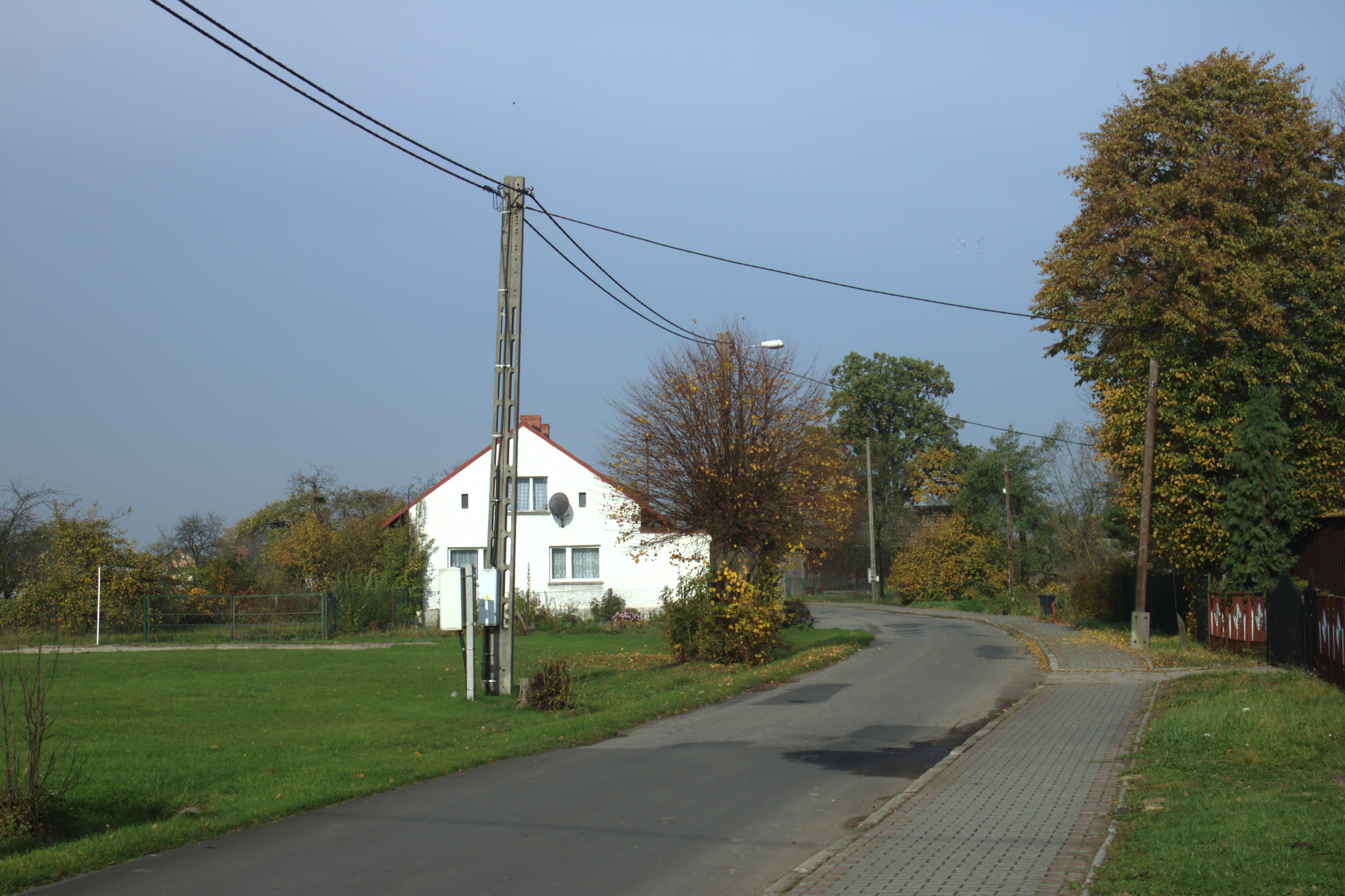
Road in Ruda

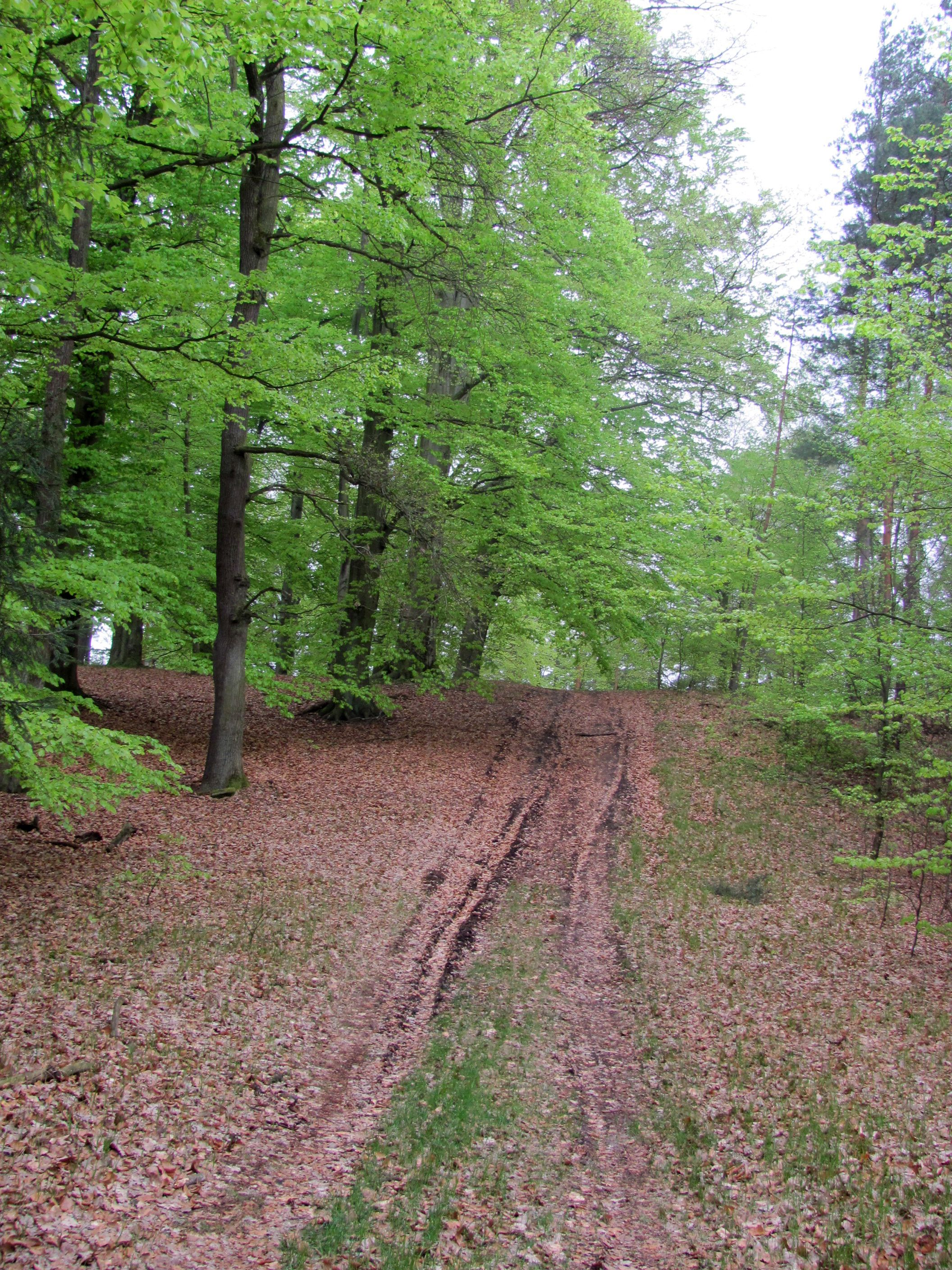
Zamkowa Góra forest
