= Budziska, Silesian Voivodeship =

Budziska
- Village
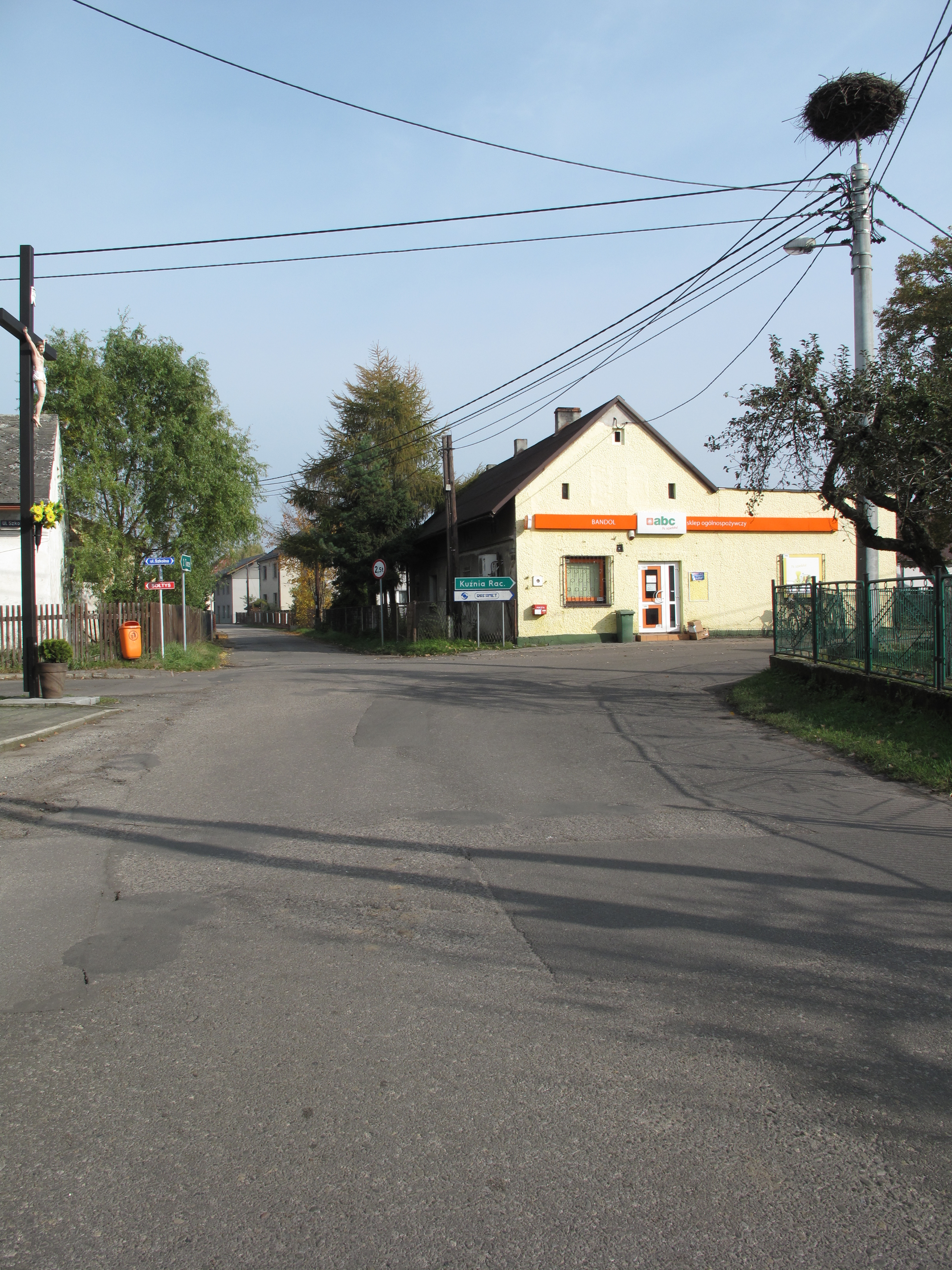
- Crossroads

- Location within Poland
- Coordinates: 50°12′N 18°16′E
- Country: Poland
- Voivodeship: Silesian
- County: Racibórz
- Gmina: Kuźnia Raciborska
- Population: 670

Budziska [buˈd͡ʑiska] is a village in the administrative district of Gmina Kuźnia Raciborska, within Racibórz County, Silesian Voivodeship, in southern Poland.

== Gallery ==
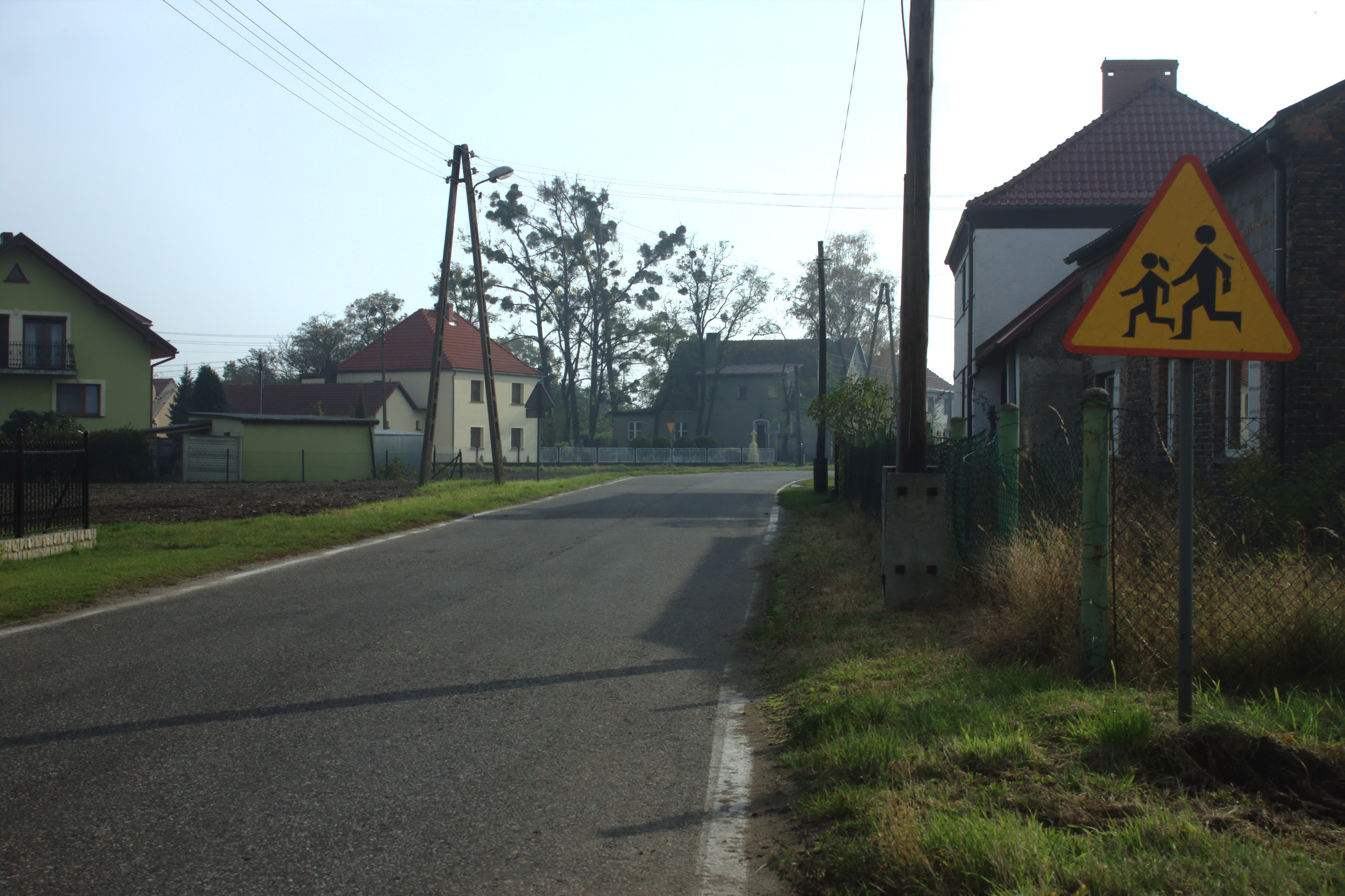
Road

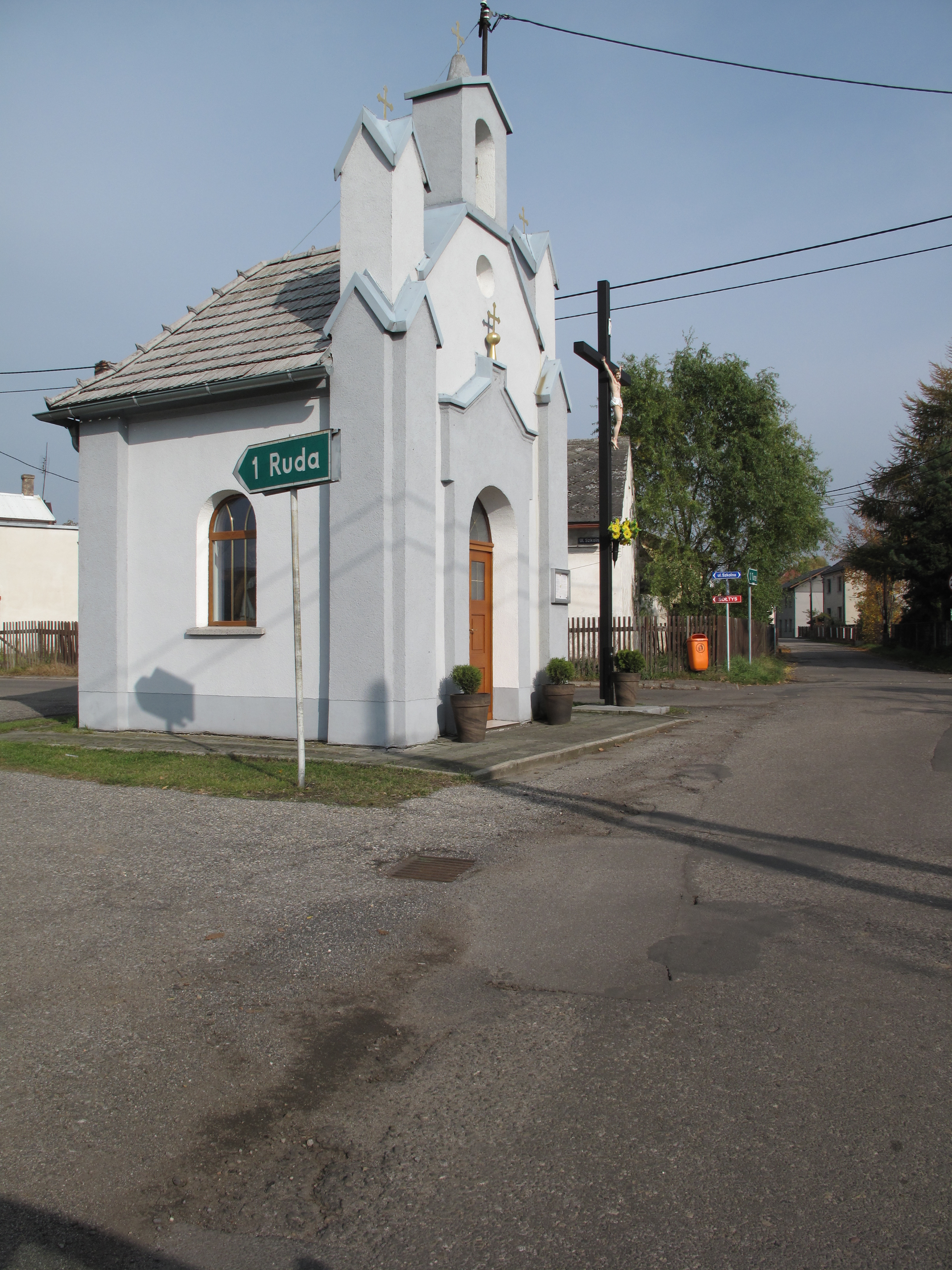
Village chapell

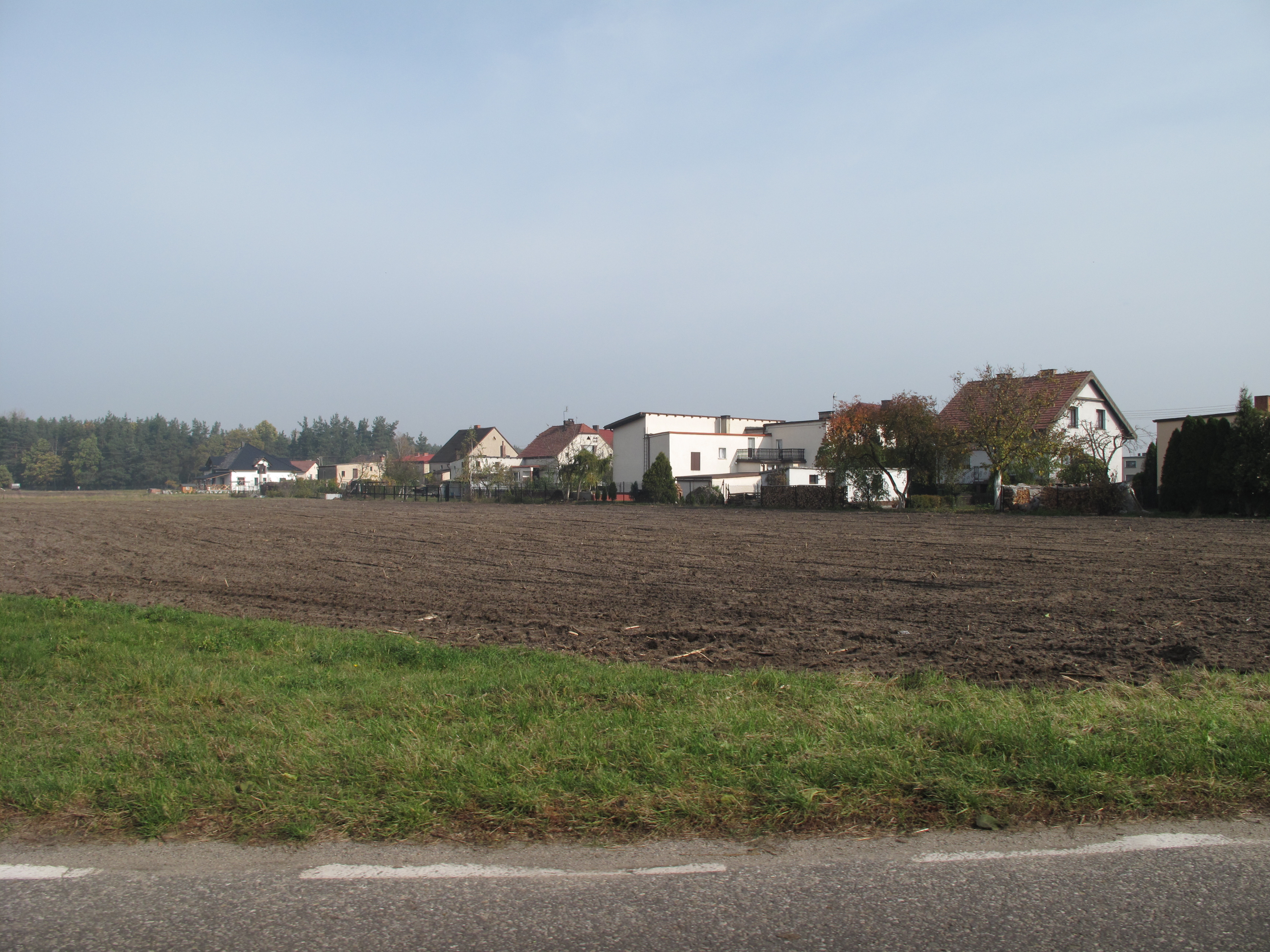
Houses behind the field
