= Łubnice, Świętokrzyskie Voivodeship =

Łubnice
- Village
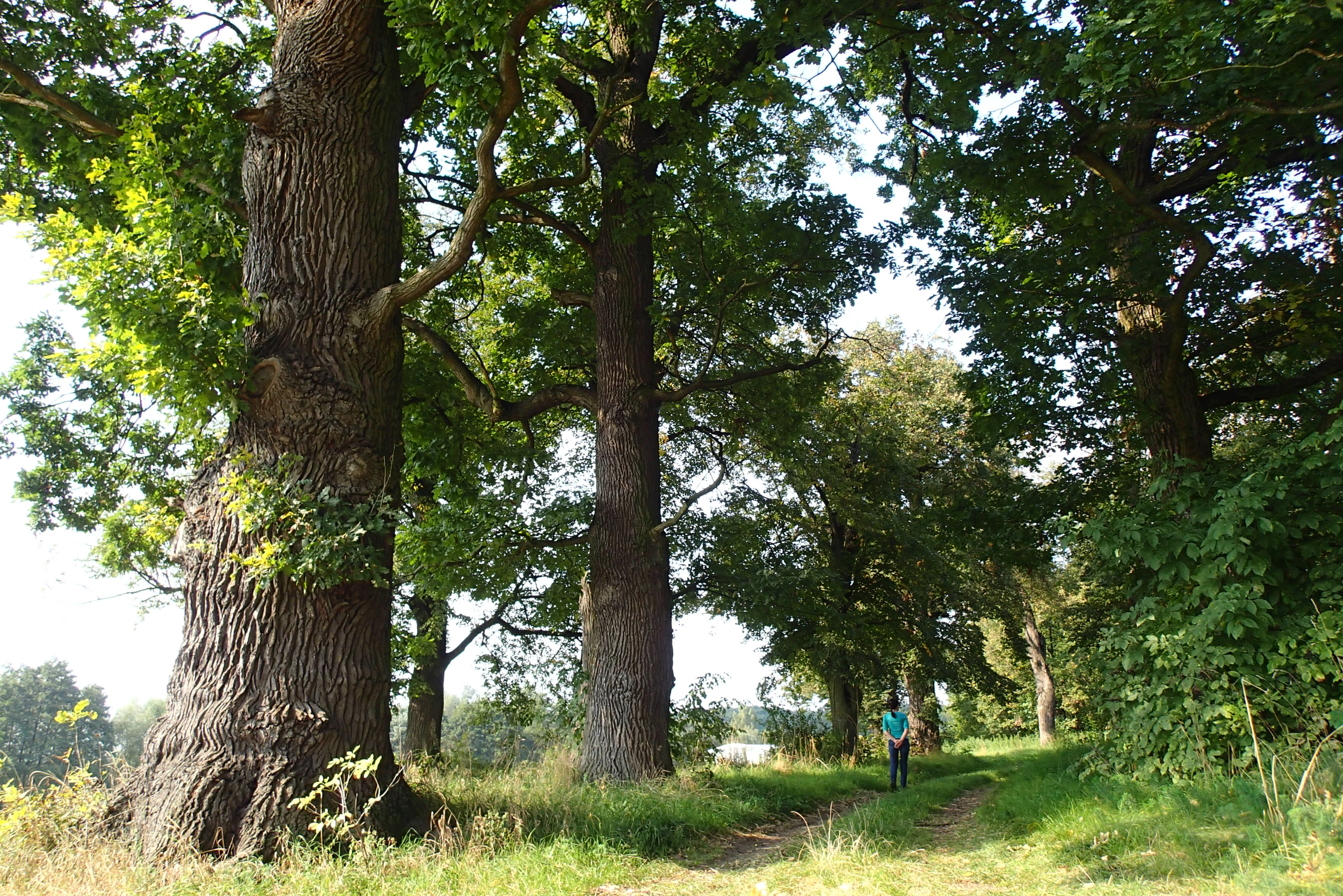
- Park

- Coat of arms

- Location within Poland
- Coordinates: 50°24′42″N 21°09′01″E
- Country: Poland
- Voivodeship: Świętokrzyskie
- County: Staszów
- Gmina: Łubnice
- Sołectwo: Łubnice
- Elevation: 183.3 m (601 ft)

Population (31 December 2009 at Census)
  - Total: ▲347
- Time zone: UTC+1 (CET)
  - Summer (DST): UTC+2 (CEST)
- Postal code: 28-232
- Area code: +48 15
- Car plates: TSZ

Łubnice [wubˈnit͡sɛ] is a village in Staszów County, Świętokrzyskie Voivodeship, in south-central Poland. It is the seat of the gmina (administrative district) called Gmina Łubnice. It lies approximately 17 km (11 mi) south of Staszów and 65 km (40 mi) south-east of the regional capital Kielce.
