= Wolica, Gmina Szydłów =

Wolica
- Village
- Location within Poland
- Coordinates: 50°34′33″N 20°57′38″E
- Country: Poland
- Voivodeship: Świętokrzyskie
- County: Staszów
- Gmina: Szydłów
- Sołectwo: Wolica
- Elevation: 218.1 m (716 ft)

Population (31 December 2009 at Census)
  - Total: ▲106
- Time zone: UTC+1 (CET)
  - Summer (DST): UTC+2 (CEST)
- Postal code: 28-225
- Area code: +48 41
- Car plates: TSZ

Wolica [vɔˈlit͡sa] is a village in the administrative district of Gmina Szydłów, within Staszów County, Świętokrzyskie Voivodeship, in south-central Poland. It lies approximately 4 km (2 mi) south-west of Szydłów, 15 km (9 mi) west of Staszów, and 42 km (26 mi) south-east of the regional capital Kielce.
