= Grabki Duże =

- Village
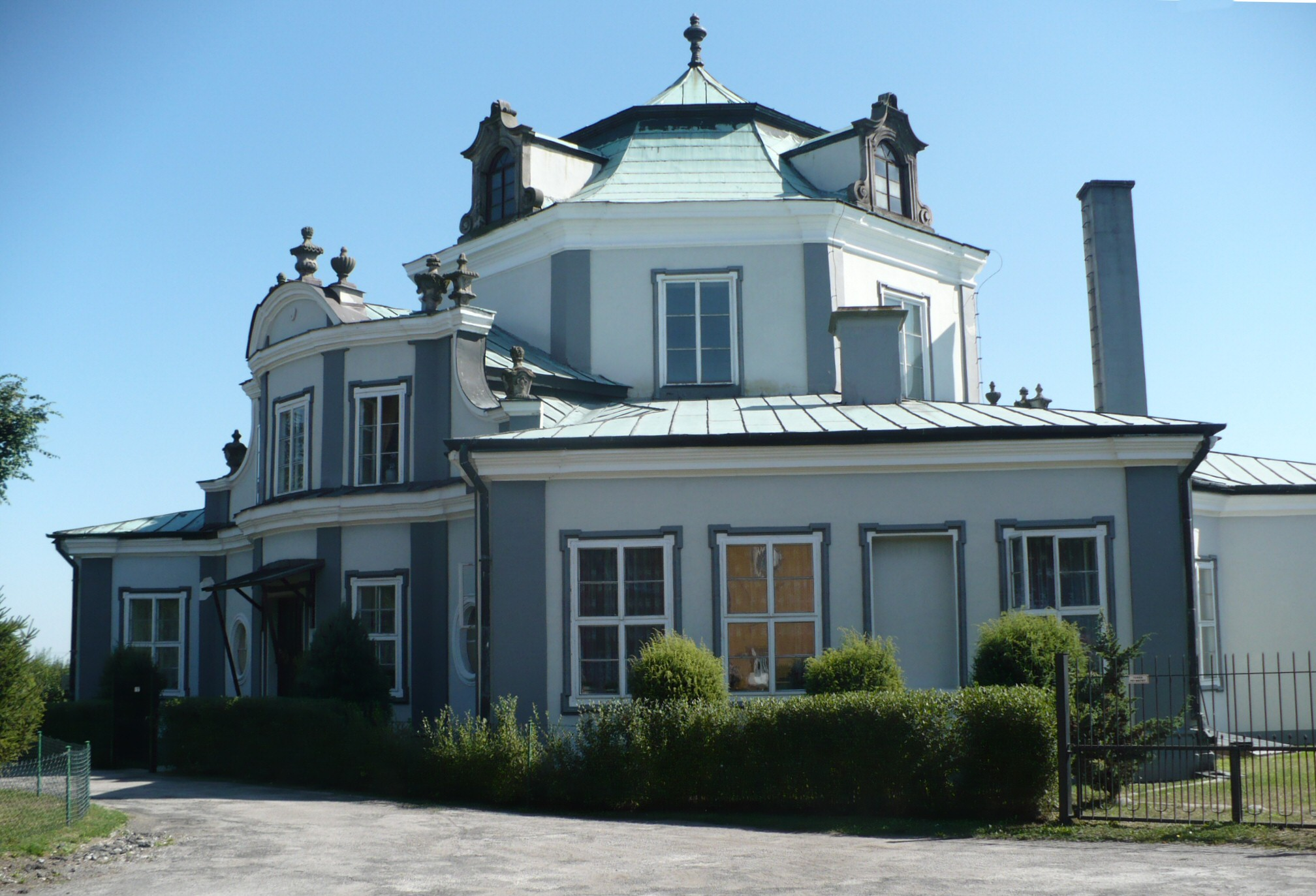
- Palace in Grabki Duże

- Location within Poland
- Coordinates: 50°35′12″N 20°57′12″E
- Country: Poland
- Voivodeship: Świętokrzyskie
- County: Staszów
- Gmina: Szydłów
- Sołectwo: Grabki Duże
- Elevation: 235.2 m (772 ft)

Population (31 December 2009 at Census)
  - Total: ▼375
- Time zone: UTC+1 (CET)
  - Summer (DST): UTC+2 (CEST)
- Postal code: 28-225
- Area code: +48 41
- Car plates: TSZ

Grabki Duże [ˈɡrapki ˈduʐɛ] is a village in the administrative district of Gmina Szydłów, within Staszów County, Świętokrzyskie Voivodeship, in south-central Poland. It lies approximately 4 km (2 mi) west of Szydłów, 16 km (10 mi) west of Staszów, and 41 km (25 mi) south-east of the regional capital Kielce.

In a village there is a baroque palace from 1742, designed in oriental style by Franciszek Placidi. It was built by a noble Stanisław Rupniewski, who spent some time in a Turkish captivity and converted himself to Islam. The palace was nicknamed "harem" by the neighbors. The palace is in private hands and can be viewed from the outside.

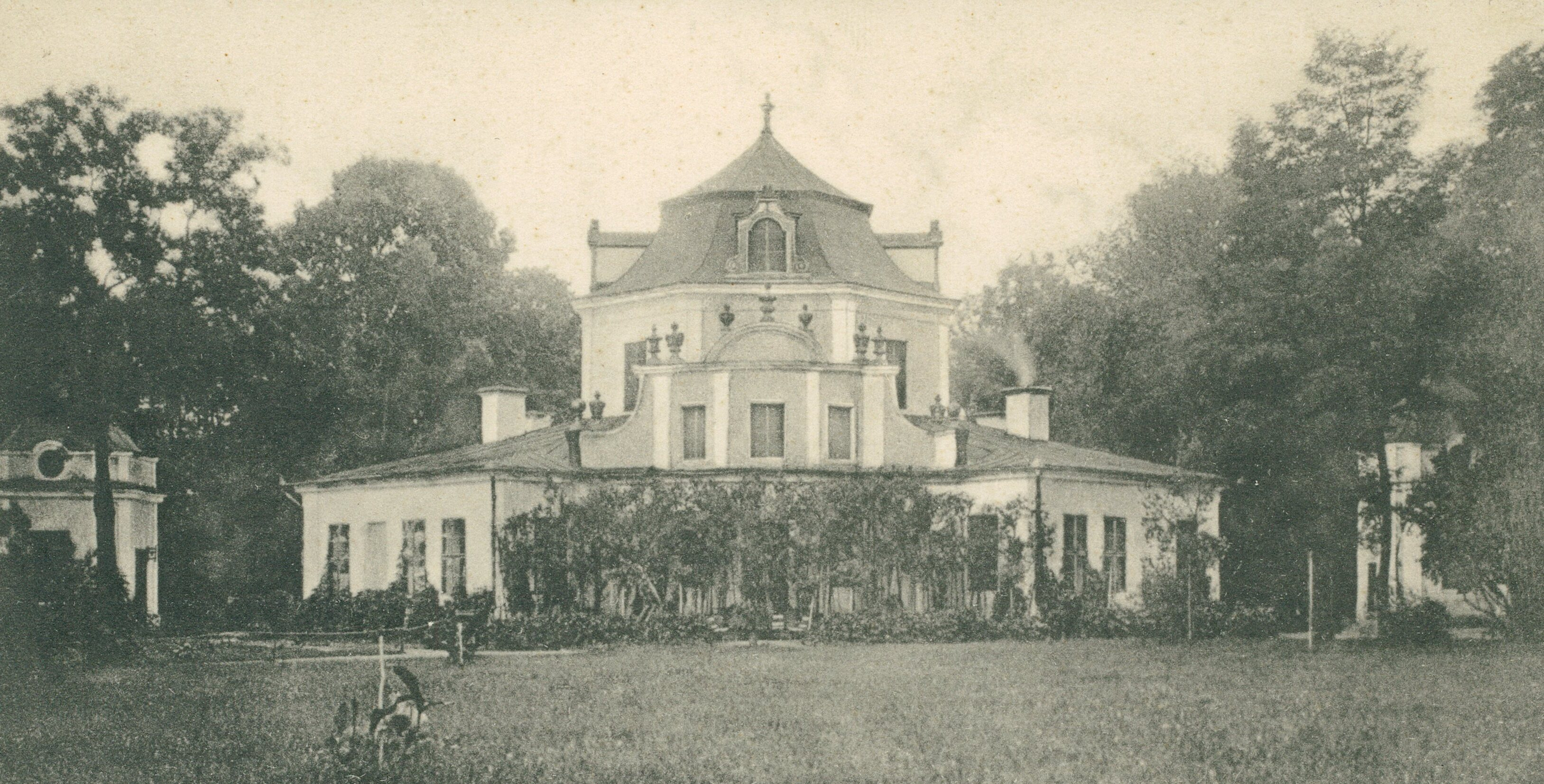
View of the palace before 1917
