= Stary Solec =

- Village
- Location within Poland
- Coordinates: 50°33′47″N 20°57′18″E
- Country: Poland
- Voivodeship: Świętokrzyskie
- County: Staszów
- Gmina: Szydłów
- Sołectwo: Stary Solec
- Elevation: 209.2 m (686 ft)

Population (31 December 2009 at Census)
  - Total: ▼385
- Time zone: UTC+1 (CET)
  - Summer (DST): UTC+2 (CEST)
- Postal code: 28-225
- Area code: +48 41
- Car plates: TSZ

Stary Solec [ˈstarɨ ˈsɔlɛt͡s] is a village in the administrative district of Gmina Szydłów, within Staszów County, Świętokrzyskie Voivodeship, in south-central Poland. It lies approximately 5 km (3 mi) south-west of Szydłów, 15 km (9 mi) west of Staszów, and 43 km (27 mi) south-east of the regional capital Kielce.

== See also ==
- The Lesser Polish Way
