= Gacki, Staszów County =

Gacki
- Village
- Location within Poland
- Coordinates: 50°34′19″N 21°01′16″E
- Country: Poland
- Voivodeship: Świętokrzyskie
- County: Staszów
- Gmina: Szydłów
- Sołectwo: Gacki
- Elevation: 229.5 m (753 ft)
  - Total: 466
- Time zone: UTC+1 (CET)
  - Summer (DST): UTC+2 (CEST)
- Postal code: 28-225
- Area code: +48 41
- Car plates: TSZ

Gacki (Polish pronunciation: [ˈɡat͡skʲi]) is a village in the administrative district of Gmina Szydłów, within Staszów County, Świętokrzyskie Voivodeship, in south-central Poland. It lies approximately 3 km (2 mi) south-east of Szydłów, 11 km (7 mi) west of Staszów, and 45 km (28 mi) south-east of the regional capital Kielce.
