= Brzeziny, Staszów County =

Brzeziny
- Village
- Location within Poland
- Coordinates: 50°36′56″N 20°57′48″E
- Country: Poland
- Voivodeship: Świętokrzyskie
- County: Staszów
- Gmina: Szydłów
- Sołectwo: Brzeziny
- Elevation: 284.9 m (935 ft)

Population (31 December 2009 at Census)
  - Total: ▼389
- Time zone: UTC+1 (CET)
  - Summer (DST): UTC+2 (CEST)
- Postal code: 28-225
- Area code: +48 41
- Car plates: TSZ

Brzeziny [bʐɛˈʑinɨ] is a village in the administrative district of Gmina Szydłów, within Staszów County, Świętokrzyskie Voivodeship, in south-central Poland. It lies approximately 4 km (2 mi) north-west of Szydłów, 16 km (10 mi) north-west of Staszów, and 39 km (24 mi) south-east of the regional capital Kielce.
