= Mokre, Świętokrzyskie Voivodeship =

Mokre
- Village
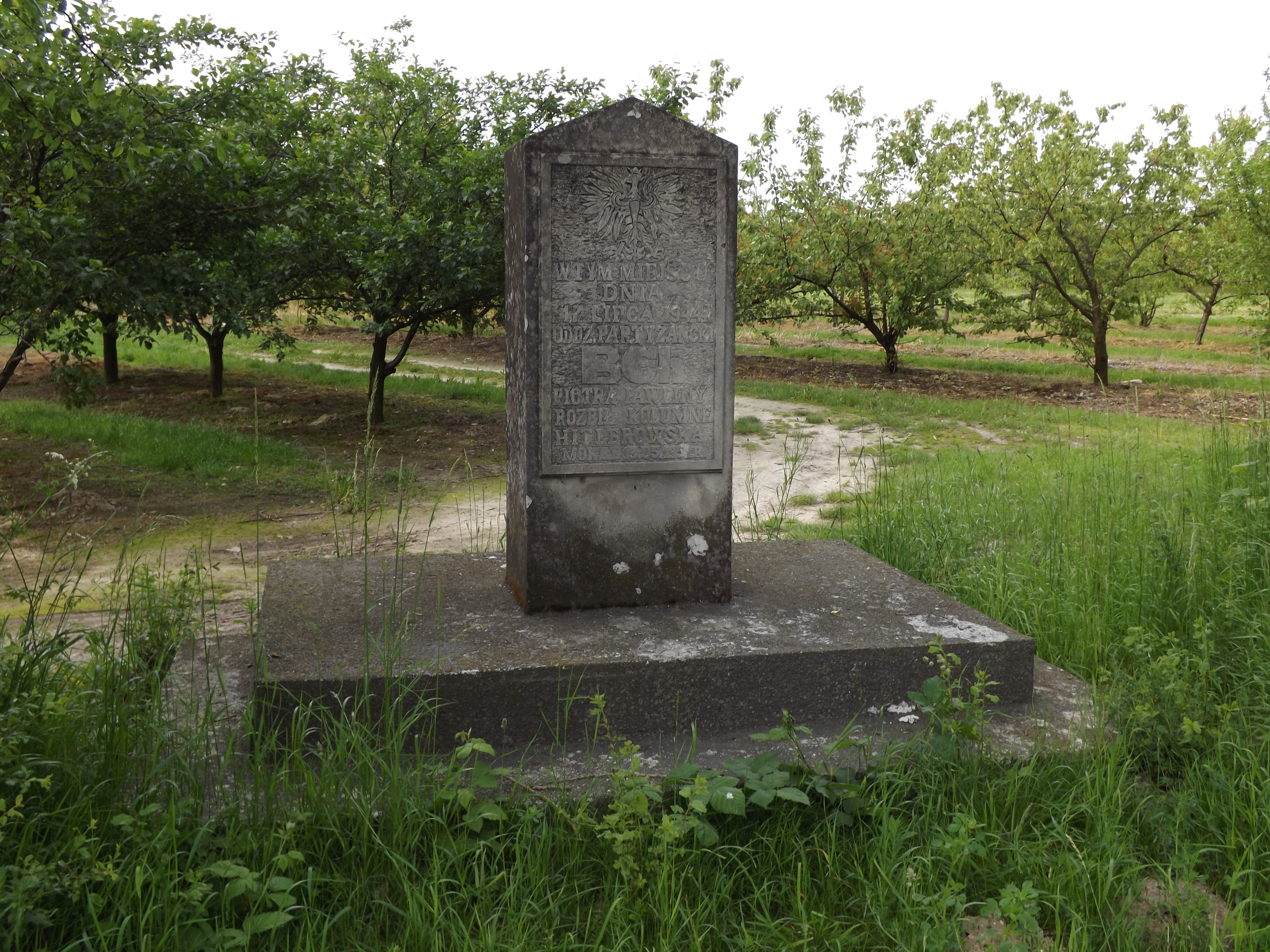

- Location within Poland
- Coordinates: 50°34′37″N 21°02′37″E
- Country: Poland
- Voivodeship: Świętokrzyskie
- County: Staszów
- Gmina: Szydłów
- Sołectwo: Mokre
- Elevation: 234 m (768 ft)

Population (31 December 2009 at Census)
  - Total: ▲157
- Time zone: UTC+1 (CET)
  - Summer (DST): UTC+2 (CEST)
- Postal code: 28-225
- Area code: +48 41
- Car plates: TSZ

Mokre [ˈmɔkrɛ] is a village in the administrative district of Gmina Szydłów, within Staszów County, Świętokrzyskie Voivodeship, in south-central Poland. It lies approximately 4 km (2 mi) south-east of Szydłów, 9 km (6 mi) west of Staszów, and 46 km (29 mi) south-east of the regional capital Kielce.
