= Jabłonica =

Jabłonica may refer to the following places:

- Jabłonica, Masovian Voivodeship (east-central Poland)
- Jabłonica, Subcarpathian Voivodeship (south-east Poland)
- Jabłonica, Świętokrzyskie Voivodeship (south-central Poland)
