= Kotuszów, Świętokrzyskie Voivodeship =

Kotuszów
- Village
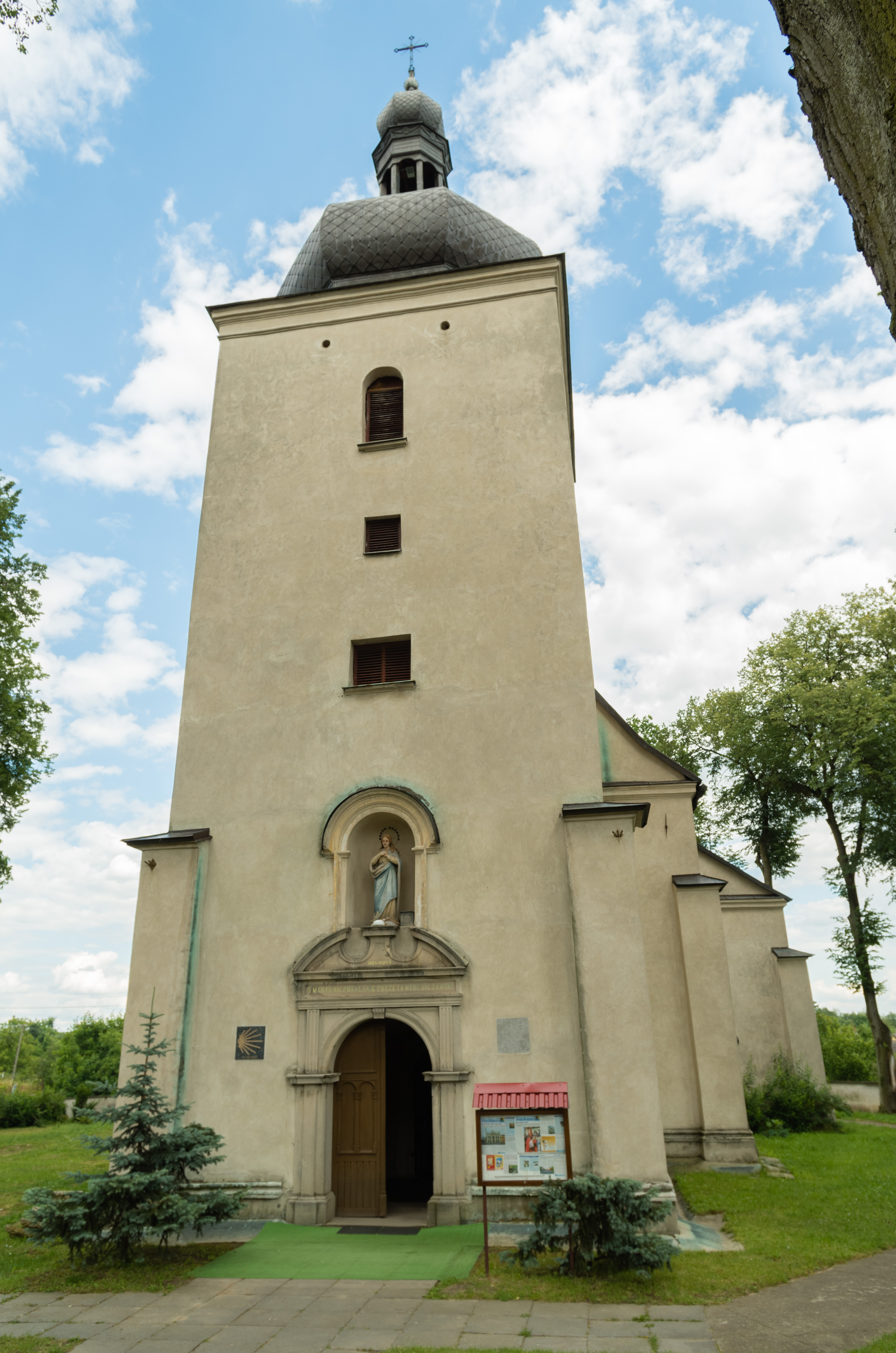
- Catholic church

- Location within Poland
- Coordinates: 50°36′23″N 21°04′06″E
- Country: Poland
- Voivodeship: Świętokrzyskie
- County: Staszów
- Gmina: Szydłów
- Sołectwo: Kotuszów
- Elevation: 224.8 m (738 ft)

Population (31 December 2009 at Census)
  - Total: ▼272
- Time zone: UTC+1 (CET)
  - Summer (DST): UTC+2 (CEST)
- Postal code: 28-225
- Area code: +48 41
- Car plates: TSZ
- Website: https://www.kotuszow.pl/

Kotuszów [kɔˈtuʂuf] is a village in the administrative district of Gmina Szydłów, within Staszów County, Świętokrzyskie Voivodeship, in south-central Poland. It lies approximately 6 km (4 mi) east of Szydłów, 9 km (6 mi) north-west of Staszów, and 45 km (28 mi) south-east of the regional capital Kielce.

== See also ==
- Lesser Polish Way
