= Rudki, Staszów County =

Rudki
- Village
- Location within Poland
- Coordinates: 50°38′56″N 20°54′15″E
- Country: Poland
- Voivodeship: Świętokrzyskie
- County: Staszów
- Gmina: Szydłów
- Sołectwo: Rudki
- Elevation: 282.3 m (926 ft)

Population (31 December 2009 at Census)
  - Total: ▲296
- Time zone: UTC+1 (CET)
  - Summer (DST): UTC+2 (CEST)
- Postal code: 28-225
- Area code: +48 41
- Car plates: TSZ

Rudki [ˈrutki] is a village in the administrative district of Gmina Szydłów, within Staszów County, Świętokrzyskie Voivodeship, in south-central Poland. It lies approximately 11 km (7 mi) north-west of Szydłów, 22 km (14 mi) north-west of Staszów, and 33 km (21 mi) south-east of the regional capital Kielce.
