= Potok, Staszów County =

Potok
- Village
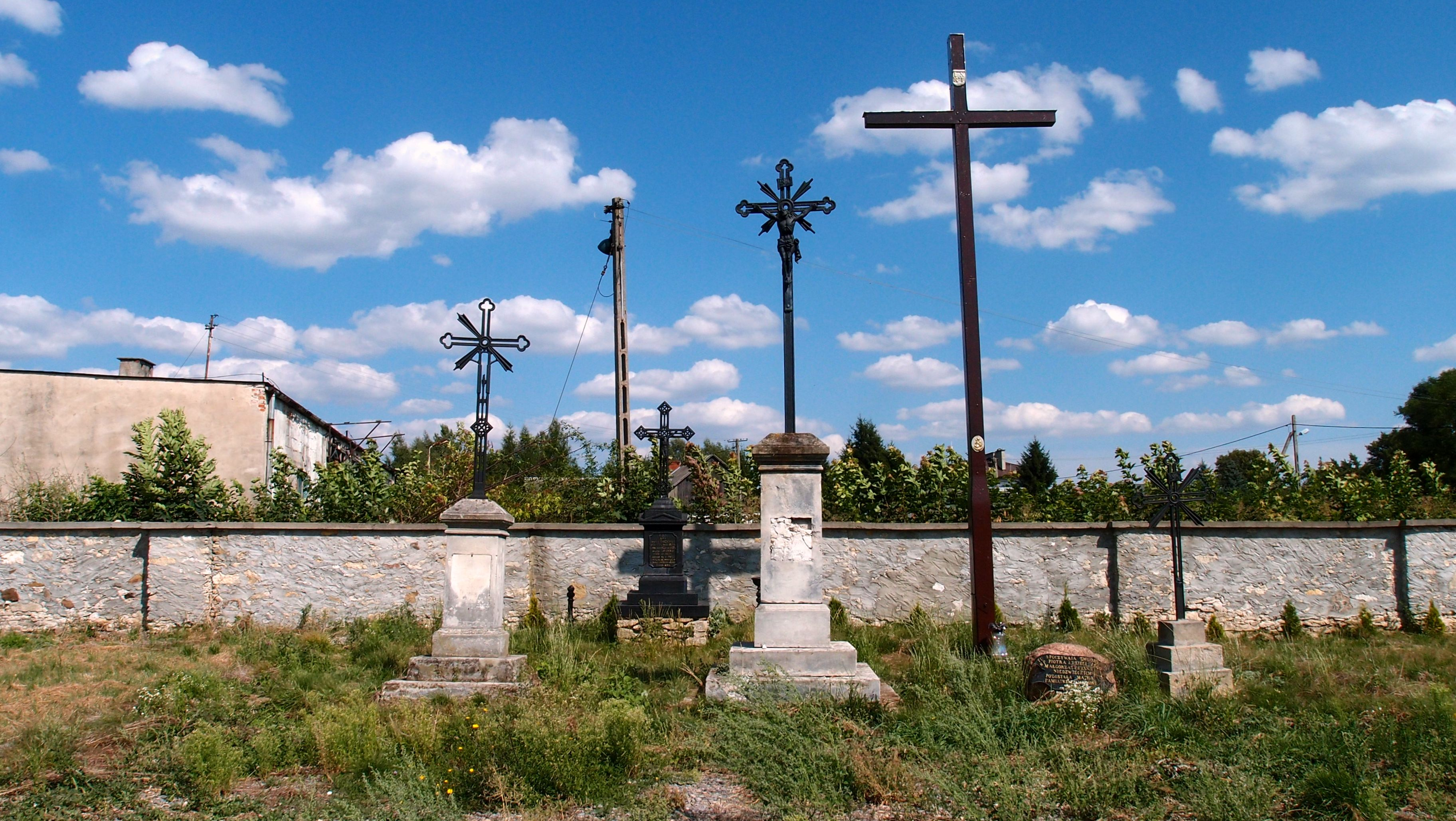
- Cemetery

- Location within Poland
- Coordinates: 50°38′59″N 20°57′15″E
- Country: Poland
- Voivodeship: Świętokrzyskie
- County: Staszów
- Gmina: Szydłów
- Sołectwo: Potok
- Elevation: 265 m (869 ft)

Population (31 December 2009 at Census)
  - Total: ▲410
- Time zone: UTC+1 (CET)
  - Summer (DST): UTC+2 (CEST)
- Postal code: 28-225
- Area code: +48 41
- Car plates: TSZ

Potok [ˈpɔtɔk] is a village in the administrative district of Gmina Szydłów, within Staszów County, Świętokrzyskie Voivodeship, in south-central Poland. It lies approximately 8 km (5 mi) north-west of Szydłów, 18 km (11 mi) north-west of Staszów, and 36 km (22 mi) south-east of the regional capital Kielce.
