= Korytnica, Staszów County =

Korytnica
- Village
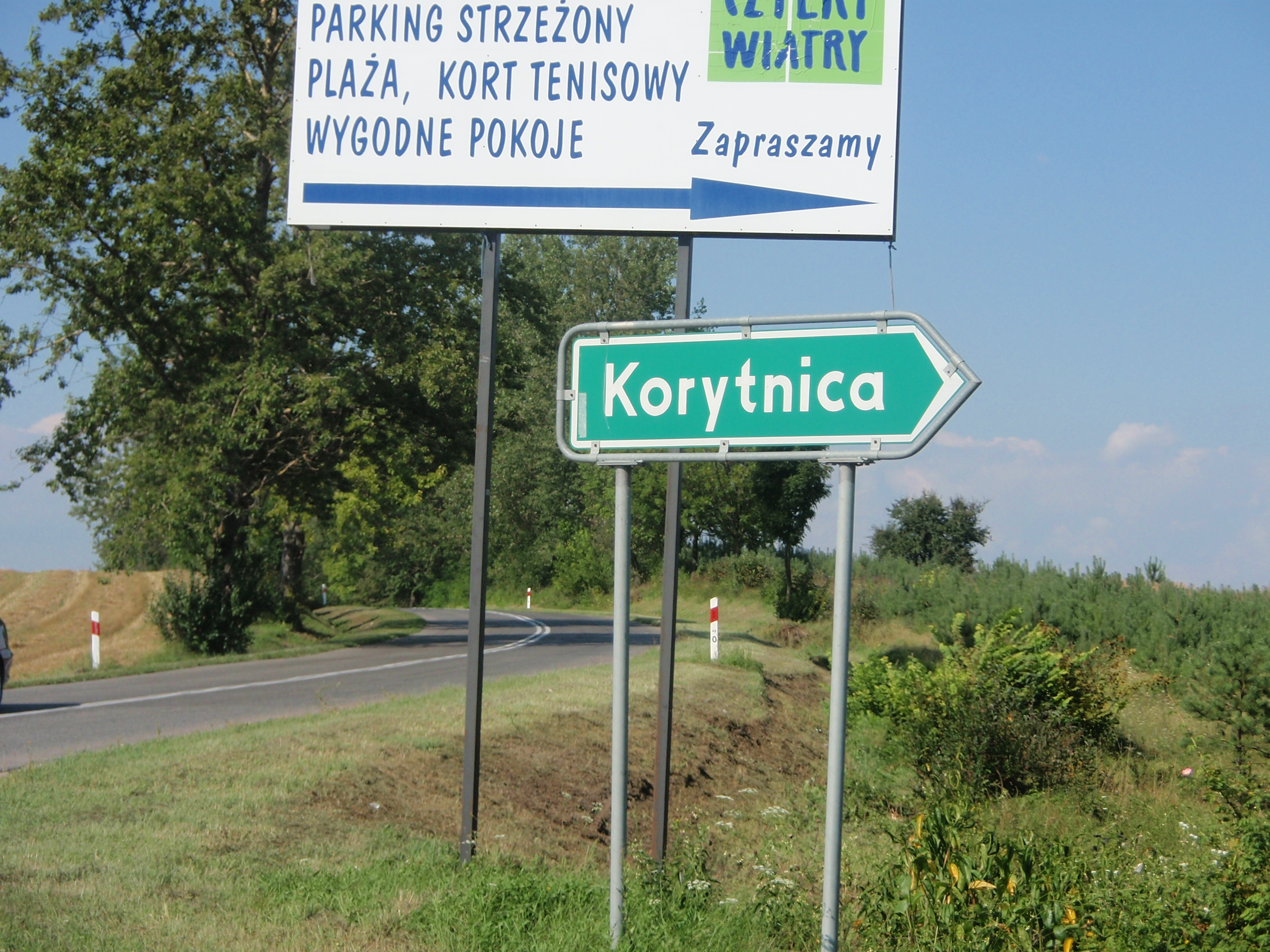

- Location within Poland
- Coordinates: 50°37′17″N 21°03′25″E
- Country: Poland
- Voivodeship: Świętokrzyskie
- County: Staszów
- Gmina: Szydłów
- Sołectwo: Korytnica
- Elevation: 228.4 m (749 ft)

Population (31 December 2009 at Census)
  - Total: ▲253
- Time zone: UTC+1 (CET)
  - Summer (DST): UTC+2 (CEST)
- Postal code: 28-225
- Area code: +48 41
- Car plates: TSZ

Korytnica [kɔrɨtˈnit͡sa] is a village in the administrative district of Gmina Szydłów, within Staszów County, Świętokrzyskie Voivodeship, in south-central Poland. It lies approximately 6 km (4 mi) north-east of Szydłów, 11 km (7 mi) north-west of Staszów, and 43 km (27 mi) south-east of the regional capital Kielce.
