= Wola Żyzna =

- Village
- Location within Poland
- Coordinates: 50°33′46″N 20°59′35″E
- Country: Poland
- Voivodeship: Świętokrzyskie
- County: Staszów
- Gmina: Szydłów
- Sołectwo: Wola Żyzna
- Elevation: 214.2 m (703 ft)

Population (31 December 2009 at Census)
  - Total: ▼282
- Time zone: UTC+1 (CET)
  - Summer (DST): UTC+2 (CEST)
- Postal code: 28-225
- Area code: +48 41
- Car plates: TSZ

Wola Żyzna [ˈvɔla ˈʐɨzna] is a village in the administrative district of Gmina Szydłów, within Staszów County, Świętokrzyskie Voivodeship, in south-central Poland. It lies approximately 4 km (2 mi) south of Szydłów, 13 km (8 mi) west of Staszów, and 45 km (28 mi) south-east of the regional capital Kielce.
