= Osówka =

Osówka may refer to the following places:

- Osówka, Kuyavian-Pomeranian Voivodeship (north-central Poland)
- Osówka, Bielsk County in Podlaskie Voivodeship (north-east Poland)
- Osówka, Hajnówka County in Podlaskie Voivodeship (north-east Poland)
- Osówka, Lublin Voivodeship (east Poland)
- Osówka, Świętokrzyskie Voivodeship (south-central Poland)
- Osówka, Lipsko County in Masovian Voivodeship (east-central Poland)
- Osówka, Sierpc County in Masovian Voivodeship (east-central Poland)
- Osówka, Żuromin County in Masovian Voivodeship (east-central Poland)
- Osówka, Greater Poland Voivodeship (west-central Poland)
