= Potok Rządowy =

- Village
- Location within Poland
- Coordinates: 50°38′28″N 20°58′28″E
- Country: Poland
- Voivodeship: Świętokrzyskie
- County: Staszów
- Gmina: Szydłów
- Sołectwo: Potok Rządowy
- Elevation: 263.5 m (865 ft)

Population (31 December 2009 at Census)
  - Total: ▼96
- Time zone: UTC+1 (CET)
  - Summer (DST): UTC+2 (CEST)
- Postal code: 28-225
- Area code: +48 41
- Car plates: TSZ

Potok Rządowy [ˈpɔtɔk ʐɔnˈdɔvɨ] is a village in the administrative district of Gmina Szydłów, within Staszów County, Świętokrzyskie Voivodeship, in south-central Poland. It lies approximately 6 km (4 mi) north of Szydłów, 17 km (11 mi) north-west of Staszów, and 38 km (24 mi) south-east of the regional capital Kielce.
