= Wymysłów, Gmina Szydłów =

Wymysłów
- Village
- Location within Poland
- Coordinates: 50°38′25″N 20°59′30″E
- Country: Poland
- Voivodeship: Świętokrzyskie
- County: Staszów
- Gmina: Szydłów
- Sołectwo: Wymysłów
- Elevation: 268 m (879 ft)
- Population (2021): 20
- Time zone: UTC+1 (CET)
  - Summer (DST): UTC+2 (CEST)
- Postal code: 28-225
- Area code: +48 41
- Car plates: TSZ

Wymysłów [vɨˈmɨswuf] is a village in the administrative district of Gmina Szydłów, within Staszów County, Świętokrzyskie Voivodeship, in south-central Poland.
