= Mateo Gucci =

Polish-Italian architect and sculptor

- Born: around 1500
- Died: around 1550
- Occupations: architect, sculptor
- Notable work: Old Synagogue

Mateo Gucci (c. 1500 – c. 1550) was a Polish-Italian Renaissance architect and sculptor.

He rebuilt the Old Synagogue in the Kraków suburb of Kazimierz, and he may have worked on the Wawel Castle. He is believed to have died in 1550, according to the town books of Kraków. He was the brother of Santi Gucci, who also worked as sculptor and architect in Poland.
