= Osówka, Świętokrzyskie Voivodeship =

Osówka
- Village
- Location within Poland
- Coordinates: 50°36′59″N 20°59′45″E
- Country: Poland
- Voivodeship: Świętokrzyskie
- County: Staszów
- Gmina: Szydłów
- Sołectwo: Osówka
- Elevation: 286.5 m (940 ft)

Population (31 December 2009 at Census)
  - Total: ▼214
- Time zone: UTC+1 (CET)
  - Summer (DST): UTC+2 (CEST)
- Postal code: 28-225
- Area code: +48 41
- Car plates: TSZ

Osówka [ɔˈsufka] is a village in the administrative district of Gmina Szydłów, within Staszów County, Świętokrzyskie Voivodeship, in south-central Poland. It lies approximately 3 km (2 mi) north of Szydłów, 14 km (9 mi) north-west of Staszów, and 40 km (25 mi) south-east of the regional capital Kielce.
