= Szydłów Synagogue =

Former synagogue in Szydłów, Poland

- Polish: Synagoga w Szydłowie
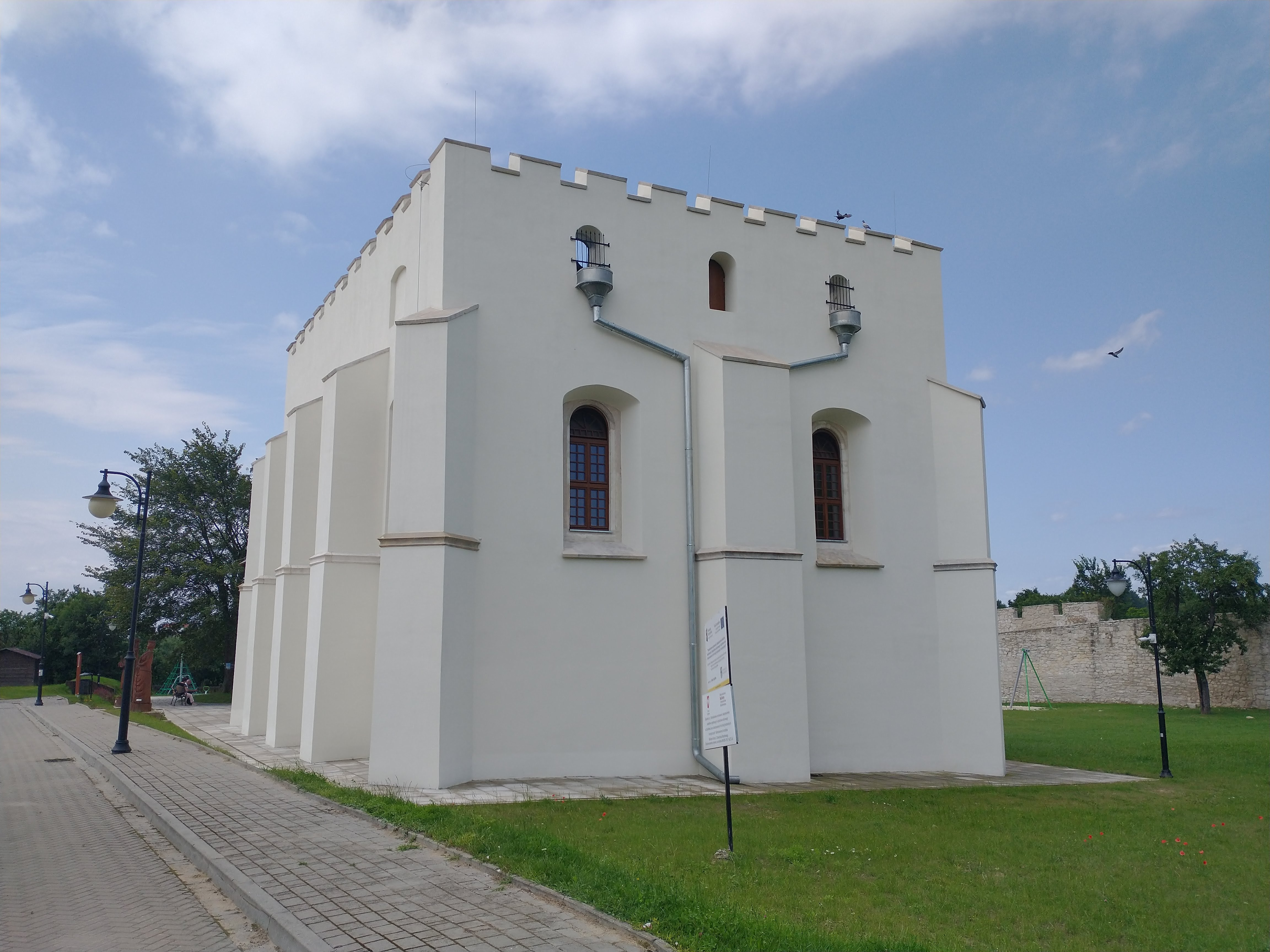
- The former synagogue, after renovation (2023)

- Location of the former synagogue in Świętokrzyskie Voivodeship

Religion
- Affiliation: Orthodox Judaism (former)
- Rite: Nusach Ashkenaz
- Ecclesiastical or organizational status: Synagogue (1564–1939); Profane use (during WWII); Cultural center; Jewish museum (since the 1980s)
- Status: Abandoned (as a synagogue); Repurposed

Location
- Location: 3 Targowa Street, Szydłów, Świętokrzyskie Voivodeship
- Country: Poland
- Interactive map of Szydłów Synagogue
- Coordinates: 50°35′31″N 21°00′04″E

Architecture
- Type: Synagogue architecture
- Style: Fortress synagogue; Renaissance; Gothic Survival
- Groundbreaking: 1534
- Completed: 1564
- Materials: Stone

The Szydłów Synagogue (Polish: Synagoga w Szydłowie) is a former Orthodox Jewish congregation and synagogue, that is located at 3 Targowa Street, in Szydłów, in the Świętokrzyskie Voivodeship of Poland. The stone fortress synagogue with heavy buttresses on all sides was completed in 1564 in the Renaissance and Gothic Survival styles.

The synagogue served as a house of prayer until World War II when it was devastated by Nazis. During the war it served as a weapons and food magazine. After the war, it briefly served as a village cinema, cultural center and has operated as a Jewish museum since the 1980s.

== History ==
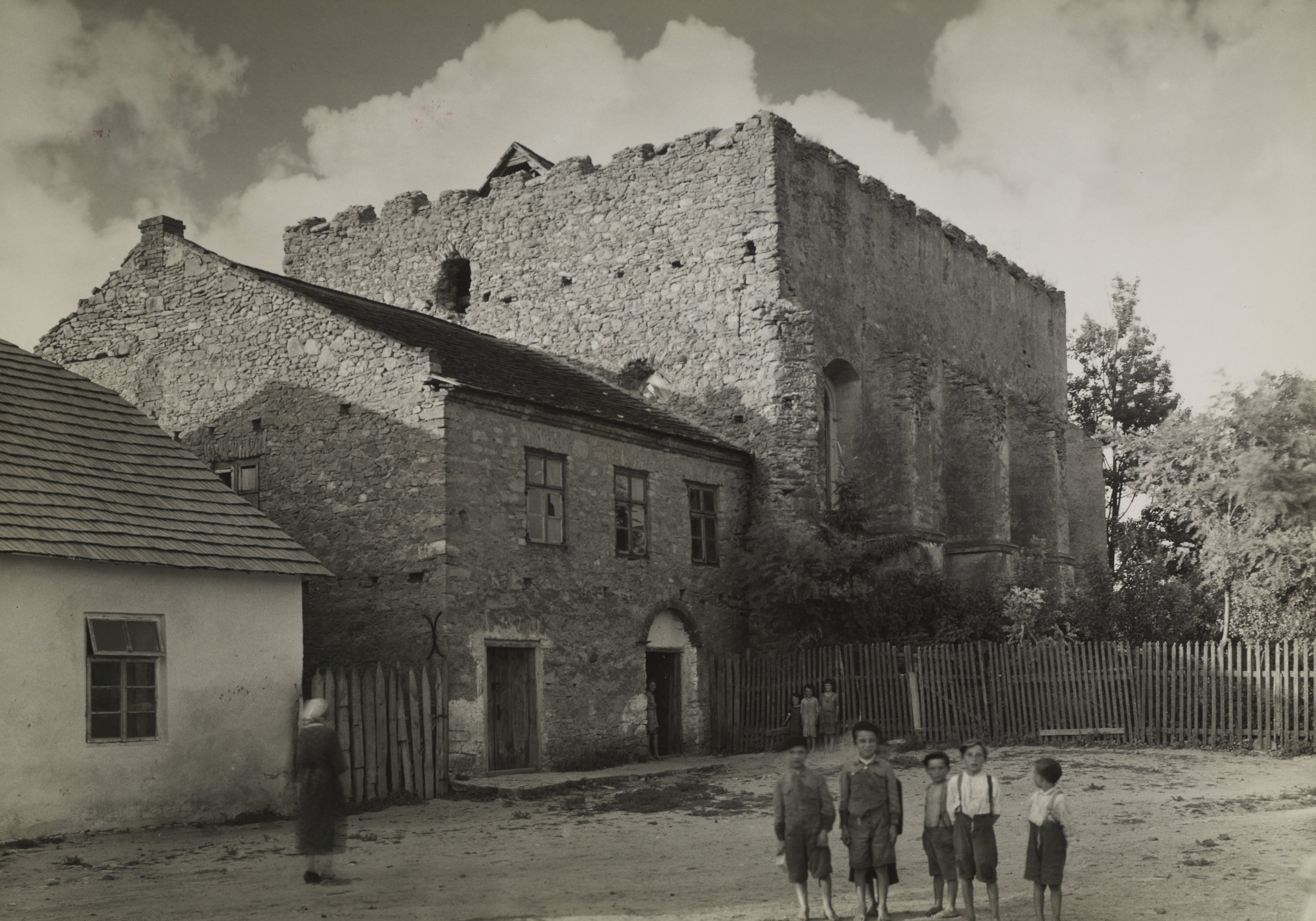
Synagogue circa 1936

Completed in the 16th century and rebuilt in the 18th-century, the interior was richly decorated by Jehuda Lejb, an artist who had decorated synagogues in Działdów and Pińczów.

Following its desecration in World War II, the building was renovated in the 1960s for use as a library and cultural centre. The women's gallery served as a town library while the main floor was a cultural center. In 1995 the library was closed due to budget cuts and the building stood in need of repair, especially to the roof, which was leaking. The renovation altered the building's exterior appearance, but the interior was preserved intact. The original, built-in, masonry Torah Ark is particularly notable.

The first official inventory of important buildings in Poland, A General View of the Nature of Ancient Monuments in the Kingdom of Poland, led by Kazimierz Stronczynski from 1844 to 1855, describes the Szydłów Synagogue as one of Poland's architecturally notable buildings.

A further renovation during the 1980s restored some of the former synagogue's historical features, including several unique wall lamps. The renovated synagogue hosts a small exhibition of Judaica elements.

== See also ==
- Chronology of Jewish Polish history
- History of the Jews in Poland
- List of active synagogues in Poland
