= Jabłonica, Świętokrzyskie Voivodeship =

Jabłonica
- Village
- Location within Poland
- Coordinates: 50°35′29″N 21°04′19″E
- Country: Poland
- Voivodeship: Świętokrzyskie
- County: Staszów
- Gmina: Szydłów
- Sołectwo: Jabłonica
- Elevation: 230.2 m (755 ft)

Population (31 December 2009 at Census)
  - Total: ▼181
- Time zone: UTC+1 (CET)
  - Summer (DST): UTC+2 (CEST)
- Postal code: 28-225
- Area code: +48 41
- Car plates: TSZ

Jabłonica [jabwɔˈnit͡sa] is a village in the administrative district of Gmina Szydłów, within Staszów County, Świętokrzyskie Voivodeship, in south-central Poland. It lies approximately 5 km (3 mi) east of Szydłów, 8 km (5 mi) north-west of Staszów, and 46 km (29 mi) south-east of the regional capital Kielce.
