= Royal Castle in Szydłów =

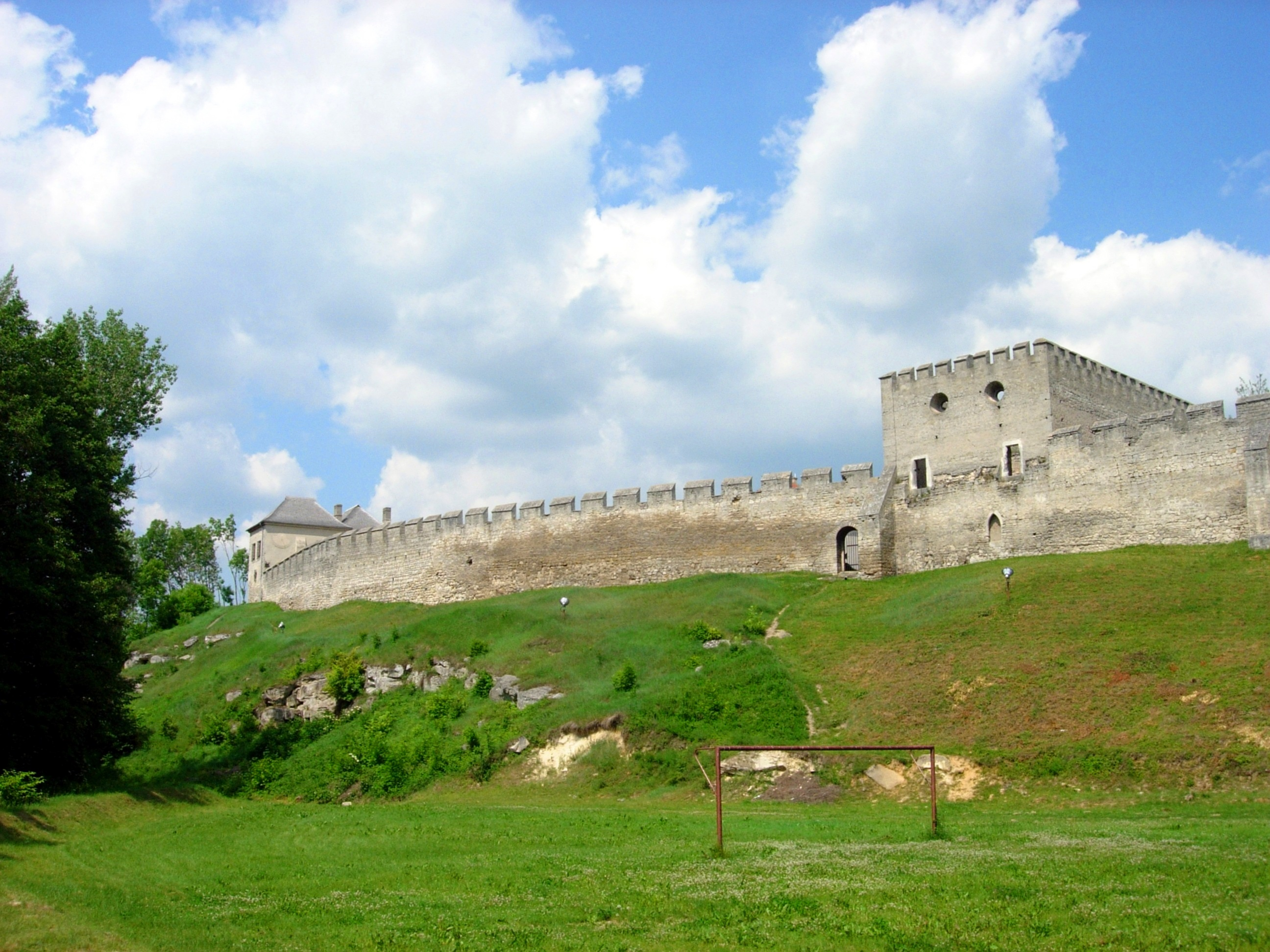
- Royal Castle in Szydłów

- Location of the Royal Castle in Szydłów in Poland
- 50°35′27″N 20°59′56″E

History
- Built: 14th century

Site notes
- Architectural style: Gothic

Royal Castle in Szydłów (Polish: Zamek Królewski w Szydłowie) is in Szydłów in Świętokrzyskie Voivodeship, Poland. The castle is located on a hill, on the bank of the River Ciekąca. The castle is located in the confinement of the town's fortification. The castle was largely used as living quarters which can be related to the interior courtyard and the large residential building.

The castle was rebuilt in the 15th century, and then twice in the 16th century following fires in 1528 and 1541. In 1630, the castle burned down due to riots by mercenary troops who demanded the payment of overdue wages. Then the castle was destroyed by the Swedish and Transylvanian troops of George II Rákóczi during the Swedish Deluge.

In 1723, the starost Józef Załuski renovated the castle and placed his coat of arms cartouche on the facade. At the end of the 18th century, the castle was abandoned by the inhabitants, which caused its slow destruction in the 19th century. During this period it was used as a stable.

In 1927, the ruins of the castle were secured. In 1946, under the leadership of Jerzy Żukowski, the west side of the perimeter walls with battlements was reconstructed. The walls of the large house were raised and crowned with new pseudo-blocks.
