= Old Synagogue (Kraków) =

Cultural museum and former synagogue in Kraków, Poland

- Polish: Synagoga Stara
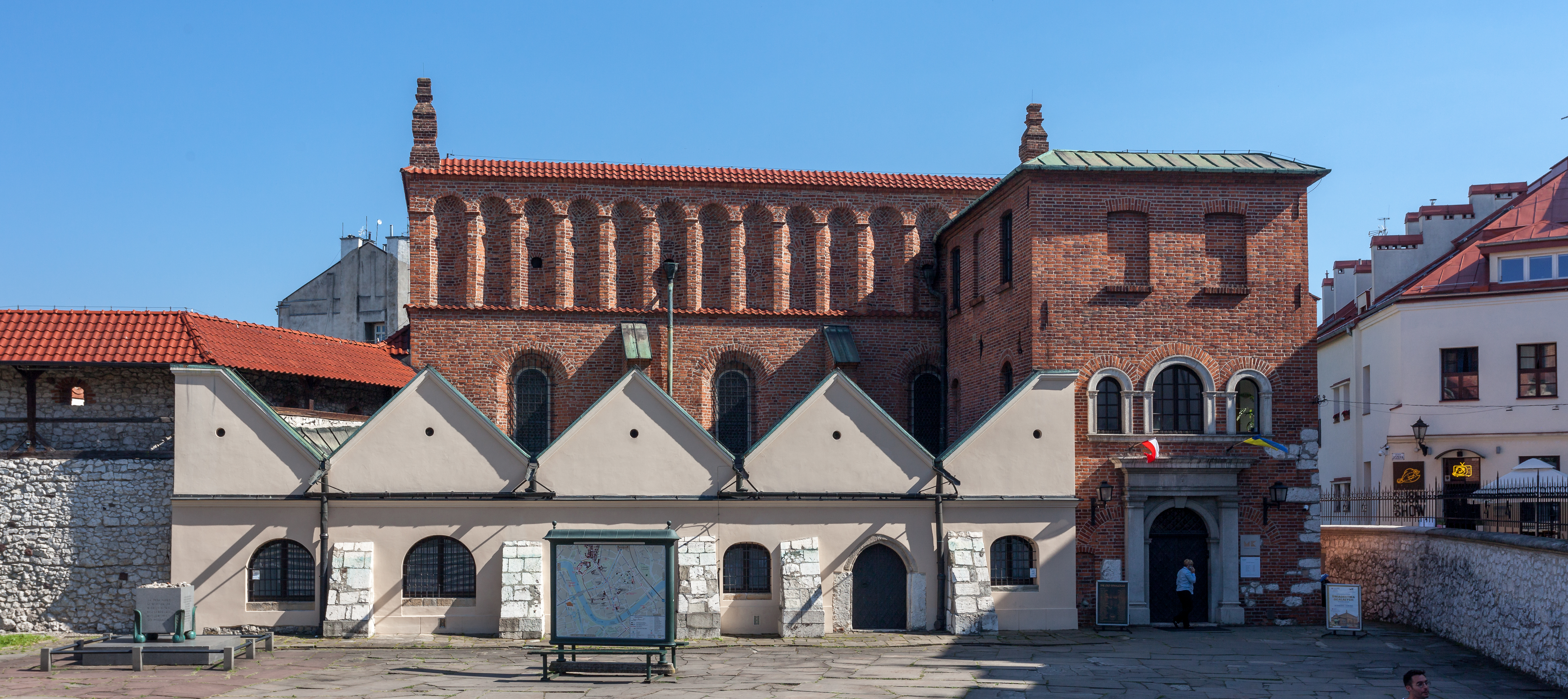

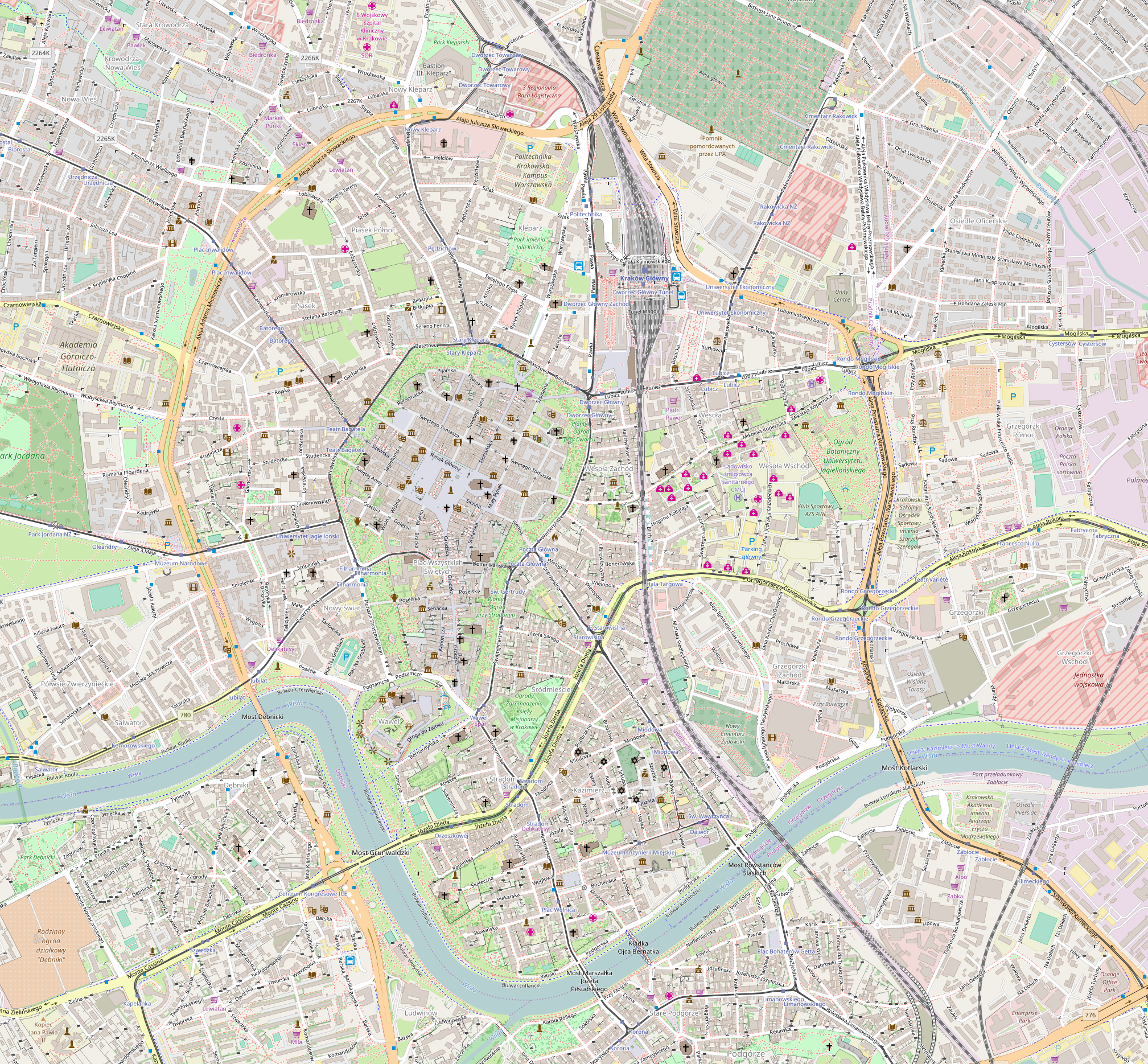
- Location of the former synagogue, now museum, in Kraków-Kazimierz

Religion
- Affiliation: Orthodox Judaism (former)
- Rite: Nusach Ashkenaz
- Ecclesiastical or organisational status: Synagogue (15th-century–1939); Profane use (1940s); Jewish museum (since 1958)
- Status: Inactive (as a synagogue); Repurposed

Location
- Location: 24 Szeroka Street, Kraków, Lesser Poland Voivodeship
- Country: Poland
- Coordinates: 50°03′05″N 19°56′55″E

Architecture
- Architects: Mateo Gucci, the Younger
- Type: Synagogue architecture (fortress synagogue)
- Style: Gothic; Mannerist
- Completed: 15th-century
- Materials: Brick

UNESCO World Heritage Site
- Type: Cultural
- Criteria: iv
- Designated: 1978
- Part of: Historic Centre of Kraków
- Reference no.: 29
- Region: Europe and North America

Historic Monument of Poland
- Designated: 1994-09-08
- Part of: Kraków historical city complex
- Reference no.: M.P. 1994 nr 50 poz. 418

The Old Synagogue (Polish: Synagoga Stara; Yiddish: דער אַלטער שול, romanized: Der Alter Shul) was a former Orthodox Jewish congregation and fortress synagogue, located at 24 Szeroka Street, in the Kazimierz district of Kraków, in the Lesser Poland Voivodeship of Poland.

Designed by Mateo Gucci, the Younger, in the Gothic and Mannerist styles, estimates vary as to when the synagogue was completed, ranging from 1407 to 1570. It is the oldest synagogue building still standing in Poland, and one of the most precious landmarks of Jewish architecture in Europe. The synagogue served as a house of prayer until World War II when it was desecrated by Nazis in 1939. It was one of the city's most important synagogues as well as the main religious, social, and organizational centre of the Kraków Jewish community.

Since 1958, the building has been repurposed as a branch of the Historical Museum of Kraków.

== History ==
The synagogue was built in 1407 or 1492; the date of building varies with several sources. The original building was rebuilt in 1570, by the Italian architect Mateo Gucci. The rebuilding included the attic wall with loopholes, windows placed far above ground level, and thick, masonry walls with heavy buttressing to withstand siege, all features borrowed from military architecture. There was further reconstruction work in 1904 and in 1913. The Old Synagogue is a rare, surviving example of a Polish fortress synagogue.

In 1794 General Tadeusz Kościuszko spoke from the synagogue to gain the Jewish support in the Kościuszko Uprising. A plaque in the entrance hall commemorates this event:

"The Jews proved to the world that whenever humanity can gain, they would not spare themselves."

— General Tadeusz Kościuszko

The synagogue was completely devastated and ransacked by the Germans during World War II. Its artwork and Jewish relics, looted. During the occupation, the synagogue was used as a warehouse. In 1943, 30 Polish hostages were executed at its wall.

== Museum ==
The Old Synagogue was renovated from 1956 to 1959 and currently operates as a museum. It is a division of the Historical Museum of Kraków, with particular focus on Kraków's Jews. The exhibits are divided into themes dealing with birth, prayer rituals, diet, divorce and death. The women's prayer room (Ezrat Nashim), dating back to the 17th century, is often used to hold temporary exhibitions. Its director is Michał Niezabitowski; and the curator is Eugeniusz Duda.

== Gallery ==
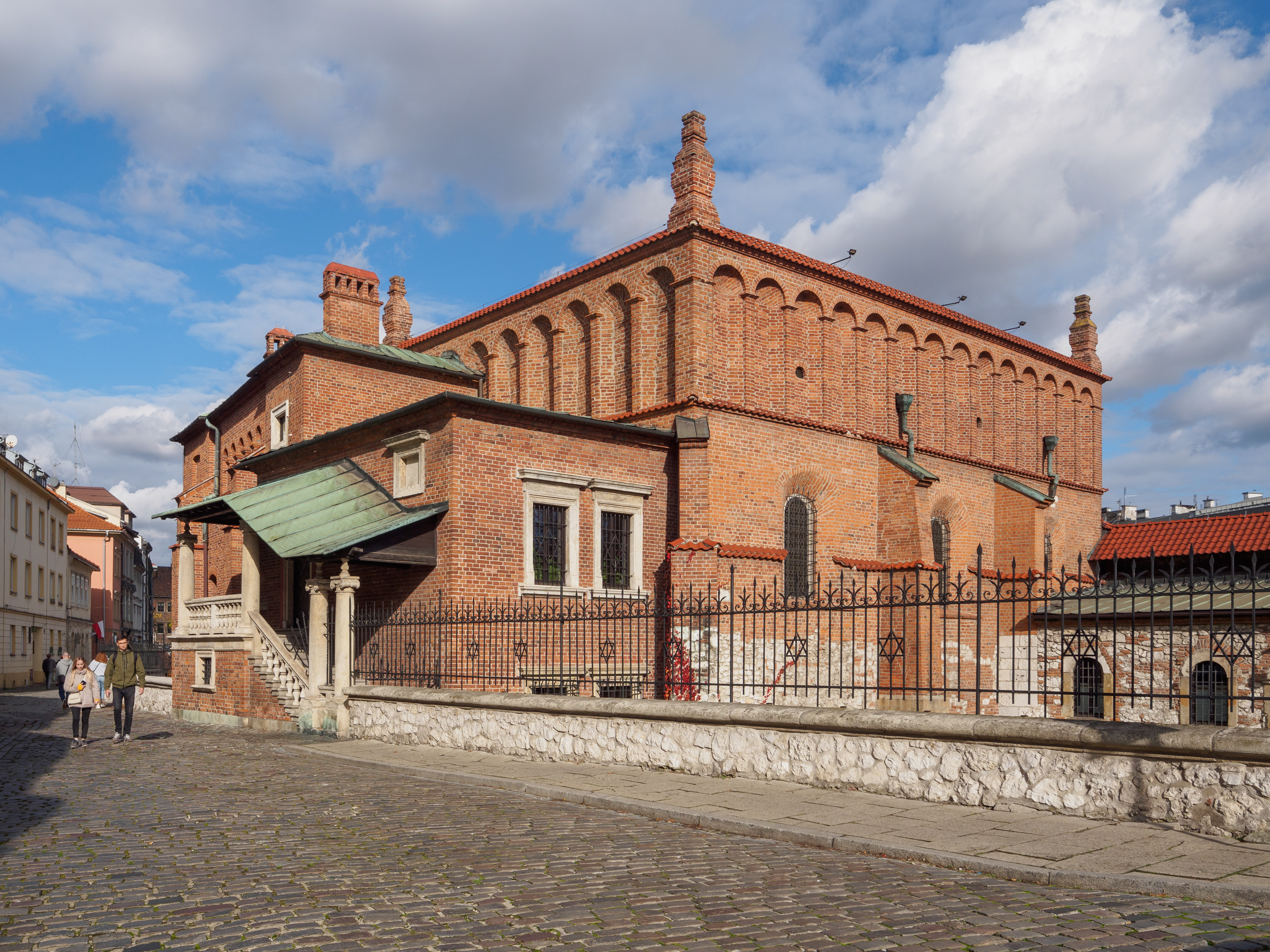
Entrance from the west and on the right the women's room

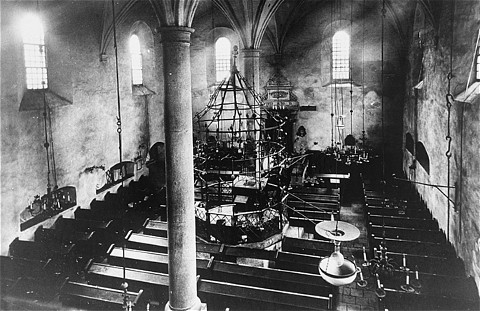
Interior of the Old Synagogue before 1939

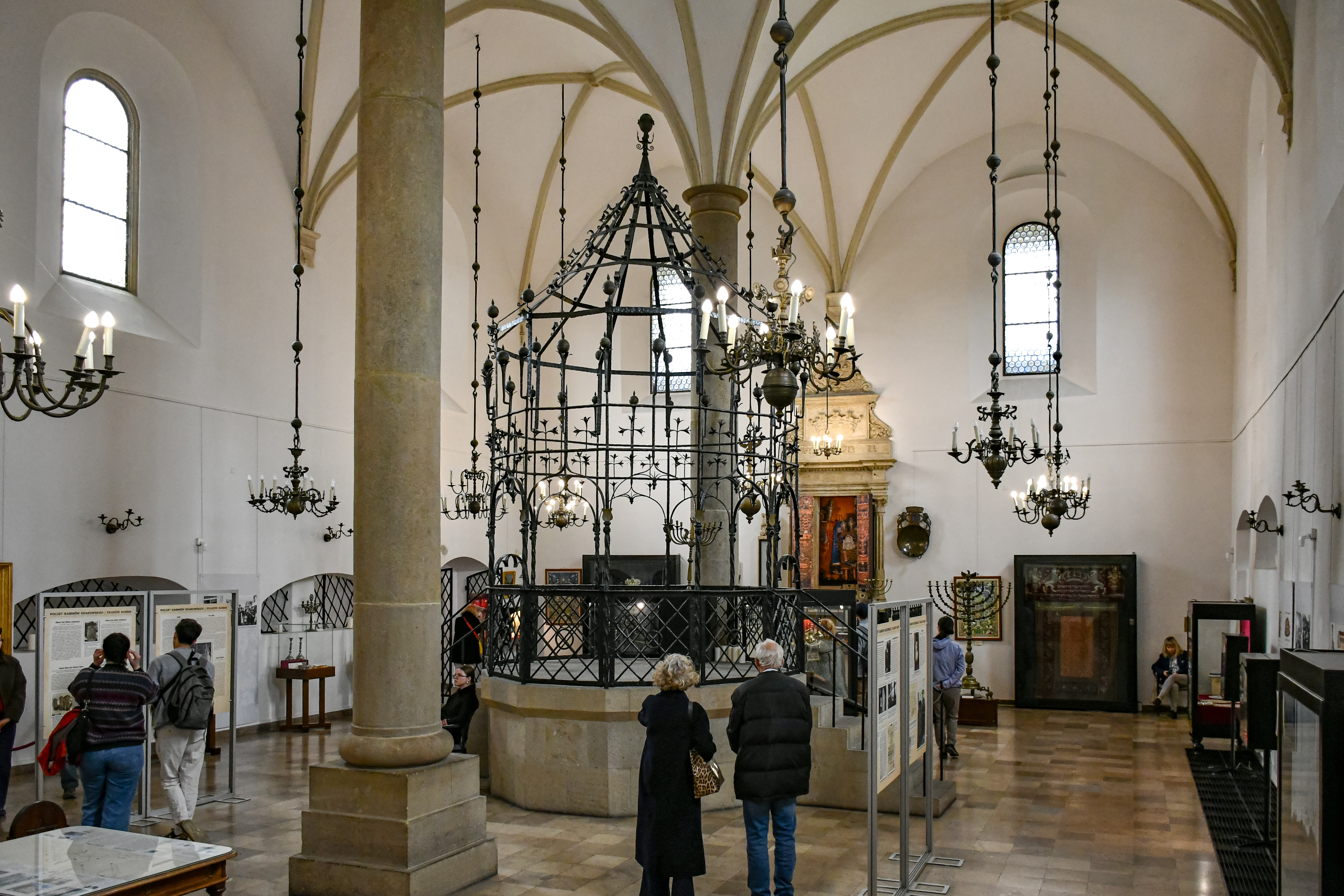
Interior of the synagogue (2025)

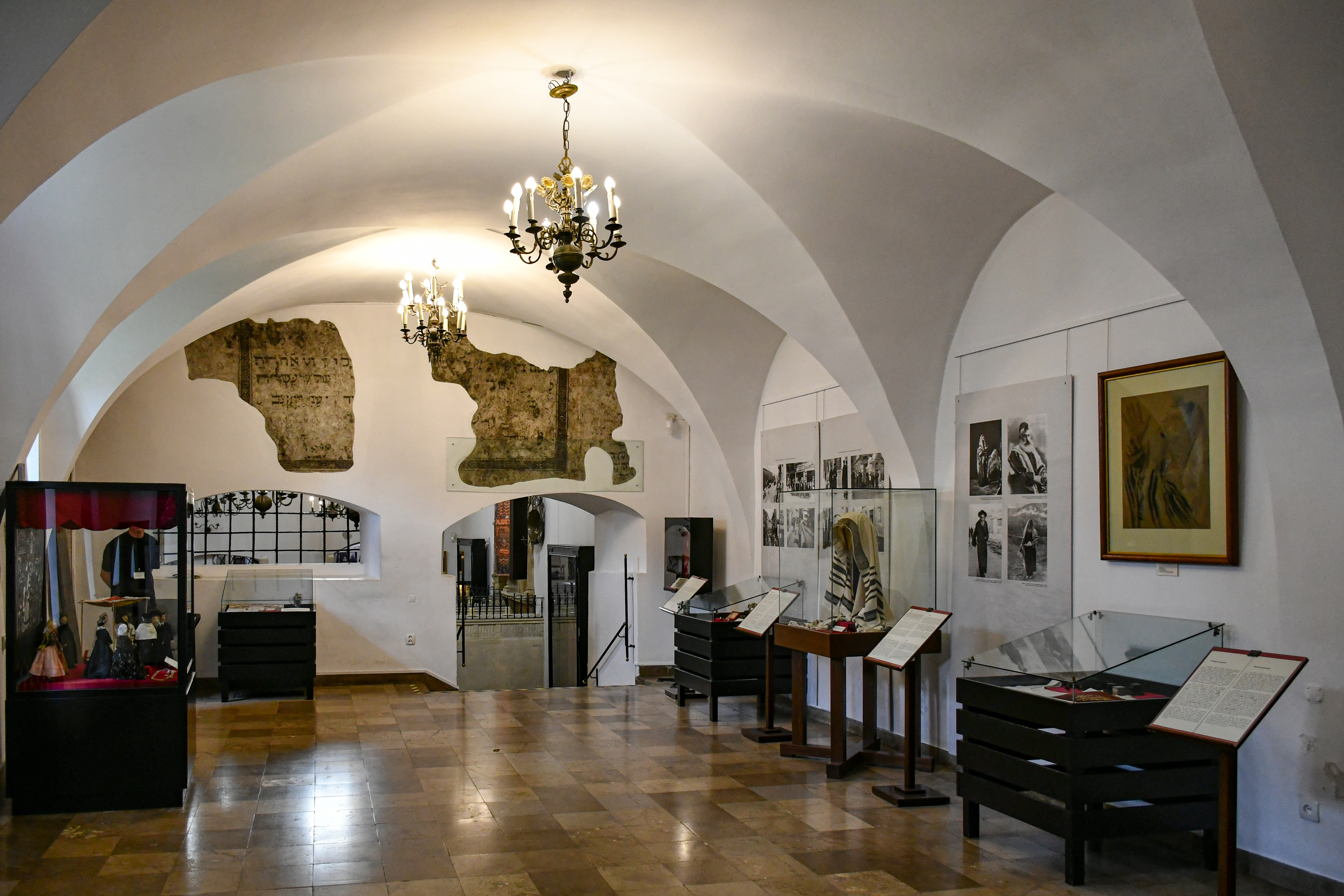
Interior of the women's room

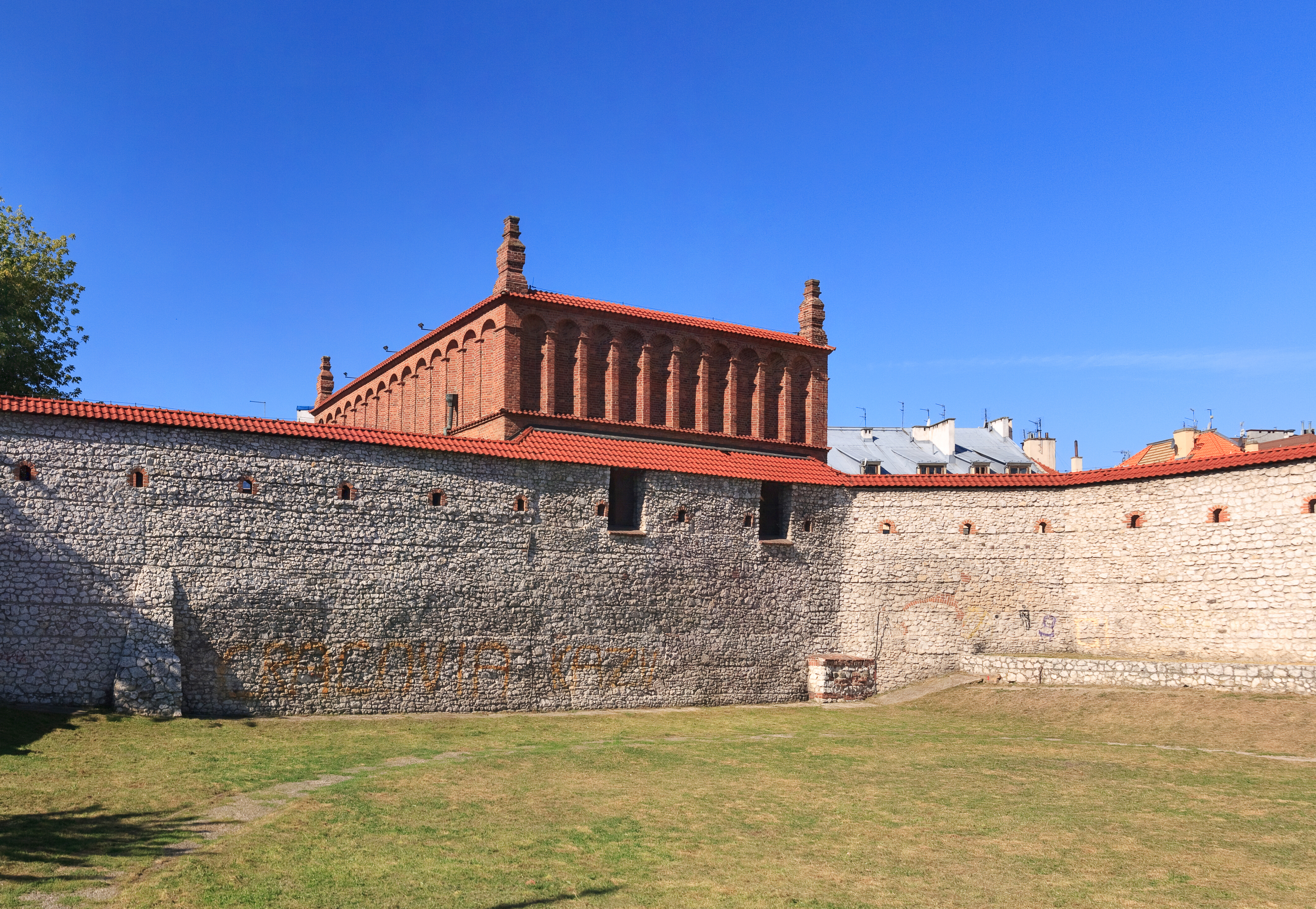
Kazimierz defensive wall

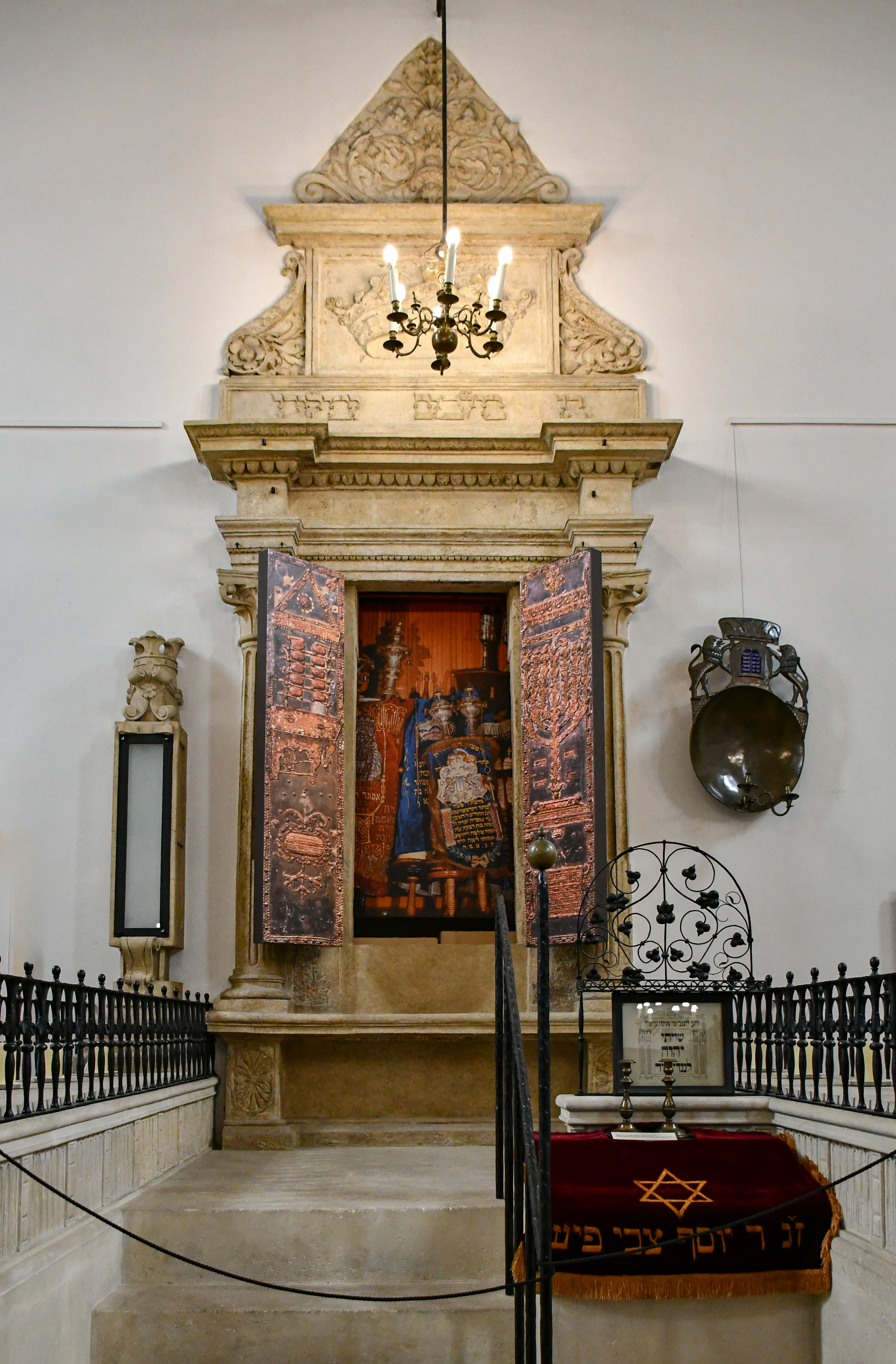
Torah ark (Aron ha-Kodesh)

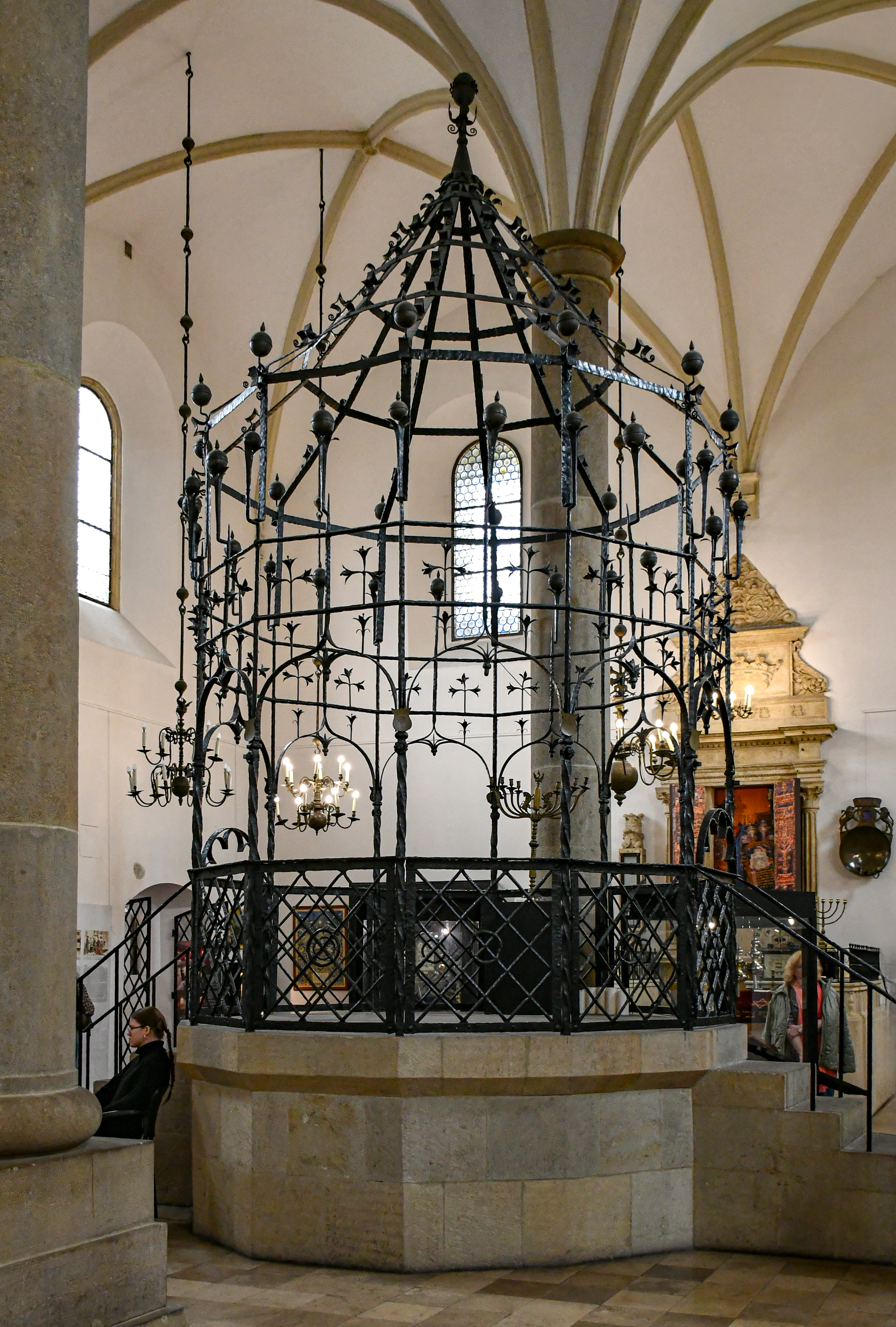
Bema

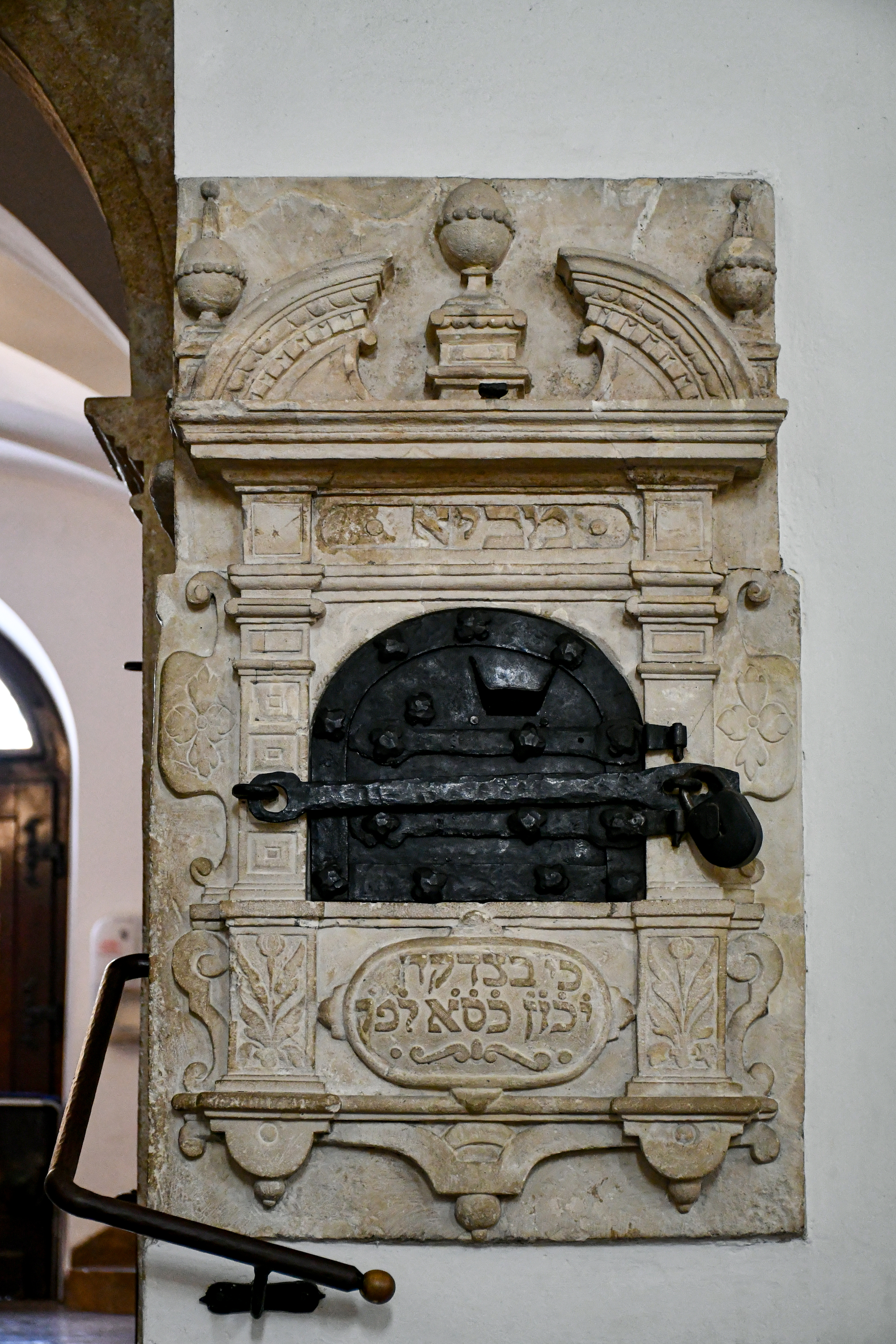
Alms box (1638)

== See also ==
- History of the Jews in Poland
- List of active synagogues in Poland
- List of museums in Poland
- Oldest synagogues in the World
- Synagogues of Kraków
