= Old Synagogue (Przemyśl) =

Destroyed synagogue in Przemyśl, Poland

- Polish: Stara Synagoga w Przemyślu
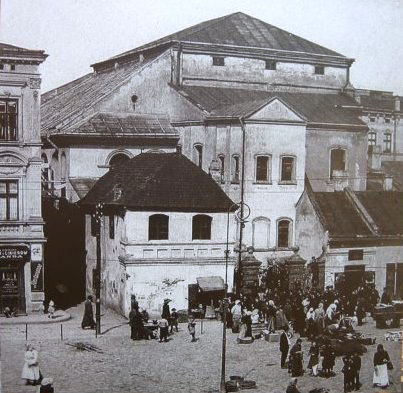
- The former synagogue, undated

- Location of the destroyed synagogue in Subcarpathian Voivodeship

Religion
- Affiliation: Orthodox Judaism (former)
- Ecclesiastical or organizational status: Synagogue (1594–1939)
- Status: Destroyed

Location
- Location: Przemyśl
- Country: Poland
- Interactive map of Old Synagogue
- Coordinates: 49°47′02″N 22°46′19″E

Architecture
- Architects: Bononi (1595); Tadeusz Mokłowski (1914)
- Type: Synagogue architecture; Fortress synagogue
- Style: Renaissance
- Groundbreaking: 1592
- Completed: 1594
- Destroyed: September 1939 (desecrated by arson); 1941 (ruined); 1956 (ruins demolished)
- Materials: Stone

The Old Synagogue (Polish: Stara Synagoga w Przemyślu) was a former Orthodox Jewish congregation and synagogue, located in Przemyśl, in the Subcarpathian Voivodeship of southeastern Poland. Designed by Bononi and completed in 1594, the fortress synagogue served as a house of prayer until World War II when it was desecrated by arson by Nazis in 1939 as they were retreating from the eastern bank of the San River; it fell into ruin in 1941 and the debris was cleared after the war.

The stone building was rectangular in shape, typical of the Renaissance style of the time. The rectangular main hall remained the only section of the original building after a range of outhouses were added in later years. They included a yeshiva, two additional halls of prayer and offices.

== History ==
The first legal regulation regarding the Jewish community of Przemyśl dates from March 20, 1559. The privilege, granted by King Sigismund Augustus, stipulates that "Jews have been living on the Jewish street in Przemyśl for a long time" have the right to settle permanently in Przemyśl and grants them trading rights. Jews were now considered under the royal jurisdiction, i.e. the waywode's court, (which is mentioned in acts of the year 1576 as the "Jews' court"). It appears from a lawsuit of the year 1560 that the Jews then possessed a wooden synagogue, said to have been founded by two wealthy Spanish immigrants. In 1561 the synagogue was attacked by the burghers. A year later in 1592, permission to build a fortress synagogue from stone in place of the old synagogue was granted by the chapter. The new building was designed by Bononi, an Italian builder of fortifications. It was completed in 1594 and situated within the city, close to its defensive walls and made up part of the city's defence structures.

The entire ghetto including "Jewish Street" in Przemyśl was almost completely destroyed by fire in 1637. The synagogue however remained unscathed. In 1661 the king issued a decree allowing the Jewish community to use the synagogue as collateral to borrow money. This illustrates the desperate economic situation of the Przemyśl Jewish community.

In 1746 Jesuit students attacked the Jewish quarter, looting Jewish homes. They plundered the synagogue and demolished its interior. The Holy Ark was destroyed and the Torah scrolls were torn up into pieces which were scattered in the streets. They also destroyed the greater part of the valuable archives, which contained priceless documents of the waywode's court. Only a few of the original copies of the privileges were saved. The extent of the damage is indicated by the fact that after tedious negotiations the Jesuits finally paid an indemnity of 15,000 Polish gulden. In 1765 there were approximately 2,418 Jews in Przemyśl.

During the years 1910-1914 the building was restored under direction of architect Tadeusz Mokłowski. At the end of March 1919, a festive prayer service was held at the synagogue in honour of the Paris Peace Conference and its decision regarding Land of Israel. Many people took part in the prayer.

In 1934 the building was listed on the register of historical buildings and in 1936 a special committee, led by H. Klagsbald, was established to renew and renovate the "Great Synagogue".

=== Destruction ===
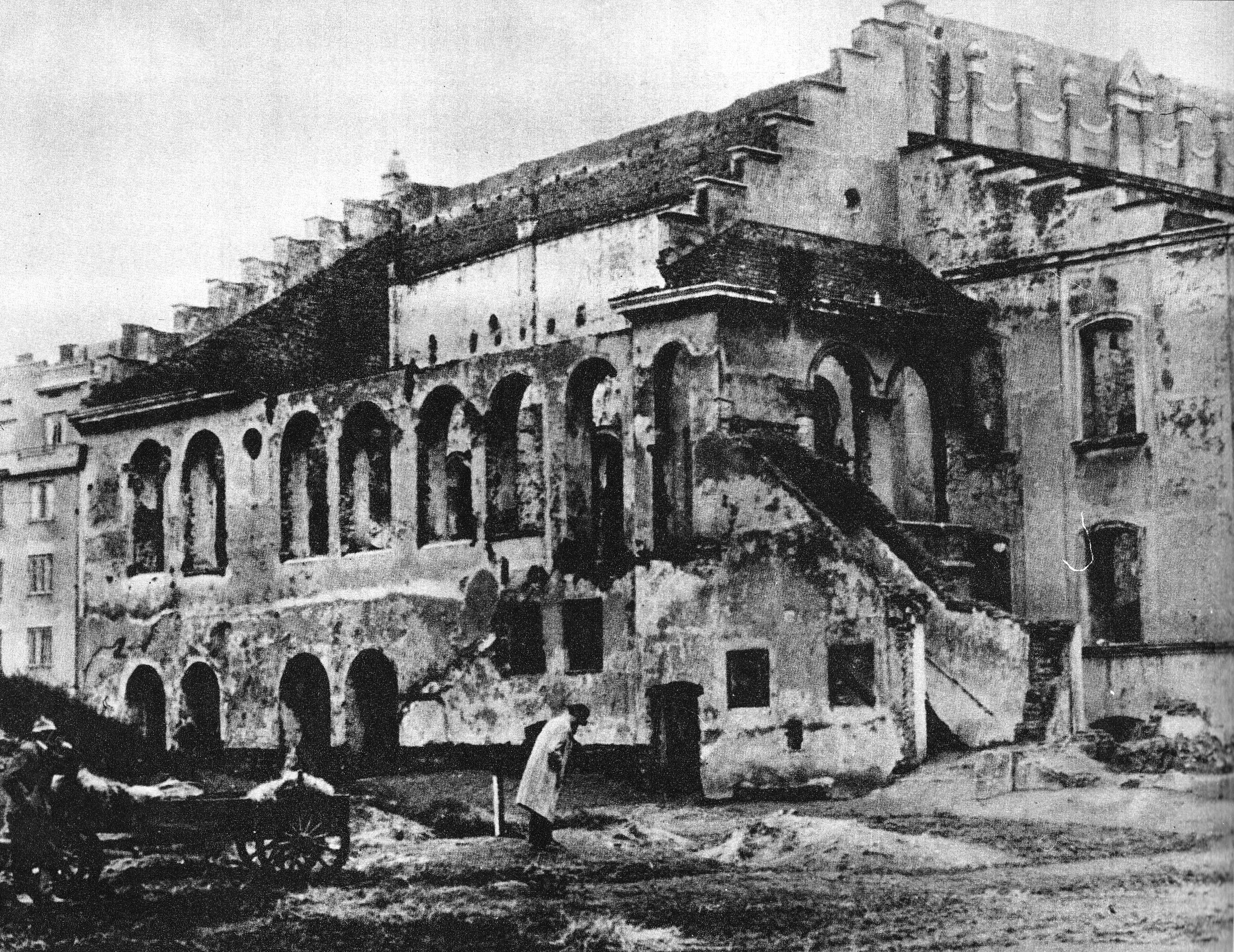
The desecrated synagogue, c. 1940

In September 1939, after the invasion of Poland by Germany and the Soviet Union, Przemyśl was divided by the German-Soviet border which ran through the middle of the city along the San River. When the Red Army entered the city on 26 September, the town centre found itself in the Soviet Union while the Zasanie district, on the western bank of the San River, was within the borders of the Nazi empire. In accordance with the Ribbentrop-Molotov pact, the Germans left the eastern bank on 28 September 1939. Before their withdrawal the Germans burned down the Old Synagogue.

In 1956 the city authorities ordered the demolition of the synagogue which had laid in ruins since 1941 when the Nazis destroyed what remained after their earlier attempt to obliterate the building. The demolition was carried out despite objections from conservationists who had plans to rebuild the synagogue.

== See also ==
- History of the Jews in Poland
- List of active synagogues in Poland
