= Gmina Szydłów =

Gmina Szydłów Szydłów Commune
- Gmina
- Coat of arms

- Coordinates (Szydłów): 50°36′18.44″N 20°59′01.85″E
- Country: Poland
- Voivodeship: Świętokrzyskie
- County: Staszów
- Seat: Szydłów

Area (through the years 2006–2010)
  - Total: 107.90 km^{2} (41.66 sq mi)

Population (31 December 2010 at Census)
  - Total: 4,800
  - Density: 44/km^{2} (120/sq mi)
- Time zone: UTC+1 (CET)
  - Summer (DST): UTC+2 (CEST)
- Postal code: 28-225
- Area code: +48 41
- Car plates: TSZ
- Website: http://www.szydlow.pl

Gmina Szydłów is a rural gmina (administrative district) in Staszów County, Świętokrzyskie Voivodeship, in south-central Poland. Its seat is the village of Szydłów, which lies approximately 13 kilometres (8 mi) west of Staszów and 43 km (27 mi) south-east of the regional capital Kielce.

The gmina covers an area of 107.90 square kilometres (41.7 sq mi), and as of 2010 its total population is ▼4,800.

== Demography ==
According to the 2011 Poland census, there were 4,800 people residing in Szydłów Commune, of whom 50.7% were male and 49.3% were female. In the commune, the population was spread out, with 18.1% under the age of 18, 36.8% from 18 to 44, 25.6% from 45 to 64, and 19.5% who were 65 years of age or older.

Table 1. Population level of commune in 2010 – by age group
SPECIFICATION					Measure unit	POPULATION (by age group in 2010)																		
SPECIFICATION					Measure unit	TOTAL	0–4	5–9	10–14	15–19	20–24	25–29	30–34	35–39	40–44	45–49	50–54	55–59	60–64	65–69	70–74	75–79	80–84	85 +
I.	TOTAL				person	4,800	234	208	260	296	408	410	286	273	262	366	377	339	292	135	180	192	185	97
I.	—	of which in			%	100	4.9	4.3	5.4	6.2	8.5	8.5	6	5.7	5.5	7.6	7.9	7.1	6.1	2.8	3.8	4	3.9	2
I.	1.	BY SEX																						
I.	1.	A.	Males		person	2,435	116	121	127	176	217	219	170	143	132	185	217	183	147	58	69	58	71	26
I.	1.	A.	—	of which in	%	50.7	2.4	2.5	2.6	3.7	4.5	4.6	3.5	3	2.8	3.9	4.5	3.8	3.1	1.2	1.4	1.2	1.5	0.5
I.	1.	B.	Females		person	2,365	118	87	133	120	191	191	116	130	130	181	160	156	145	77	111	134	114	71
I.	1.	B.	—	of which in	%	49.3	2.5	1.8	2.8	2.5	4	4	2.4	2.7	2.7	3.8	3.3	3.3	3	1.6	2.3	2.8	2.4	1.5

Figure 1. Population pyramid of commune in 2010 – by age group and sex

Table 2. Population level of commune in 2010 – by sex
SPECIFICATION						Measure unit	POPULATION (by sex in 2010)		
SPECIFICATION						Measure unit	TOTAL	Males	Females
I.	TOTAL					person	4,800	2,435	2,365
I.	—	of which in				%	100	50.7	49.3
I.	1.	BY AGE GROUP							
I.	1.	A.	At pre-working age			person	869	464	405
I.	1.	A.	—	of which in		%	18.1	9.7	8.4
I.	1.	B.	At working age. grand total			person	2,997	1,689	1,308
I.	1.	B.	—	of which in		%	62.4	35.2	27.3
I.	1.	B.	a.	at mobile working age		person	1,768	957	811
I.	1.	B.	a.	—	of which in | %	36.8	19.9	16.9	
I.	1.	B.	b.	at non-mobile working age		person	1,229	732	497
I.	1.	B.	b.	—	of which in | %	25.6	15.2	10.4	
I.	1.	C.	At post-working age			person	934	282	652
I.	1.	C.	—	of which in		%	19.5	5.9	13.6

== Villages ==
Gmina Szydłów contains the villages and settlements of Brzeziny, Gacki, Grabki Duże, Jabłonica, Korytnica, Kotuszów, Mokre, Osówka, Potok, Potok Rządowy, Rudki, Stary Solec, Szydłów, Wola Żyzna, Wolica and Wymysłów.

== Neighbouring gminas ==
Gmina Szydłów is bordered by the gminas of Gnojno, Pierzchnica, Raków, Staszów and Tuczępy.
