= Fortress synagogue =

Synagogue built to withstand attacks

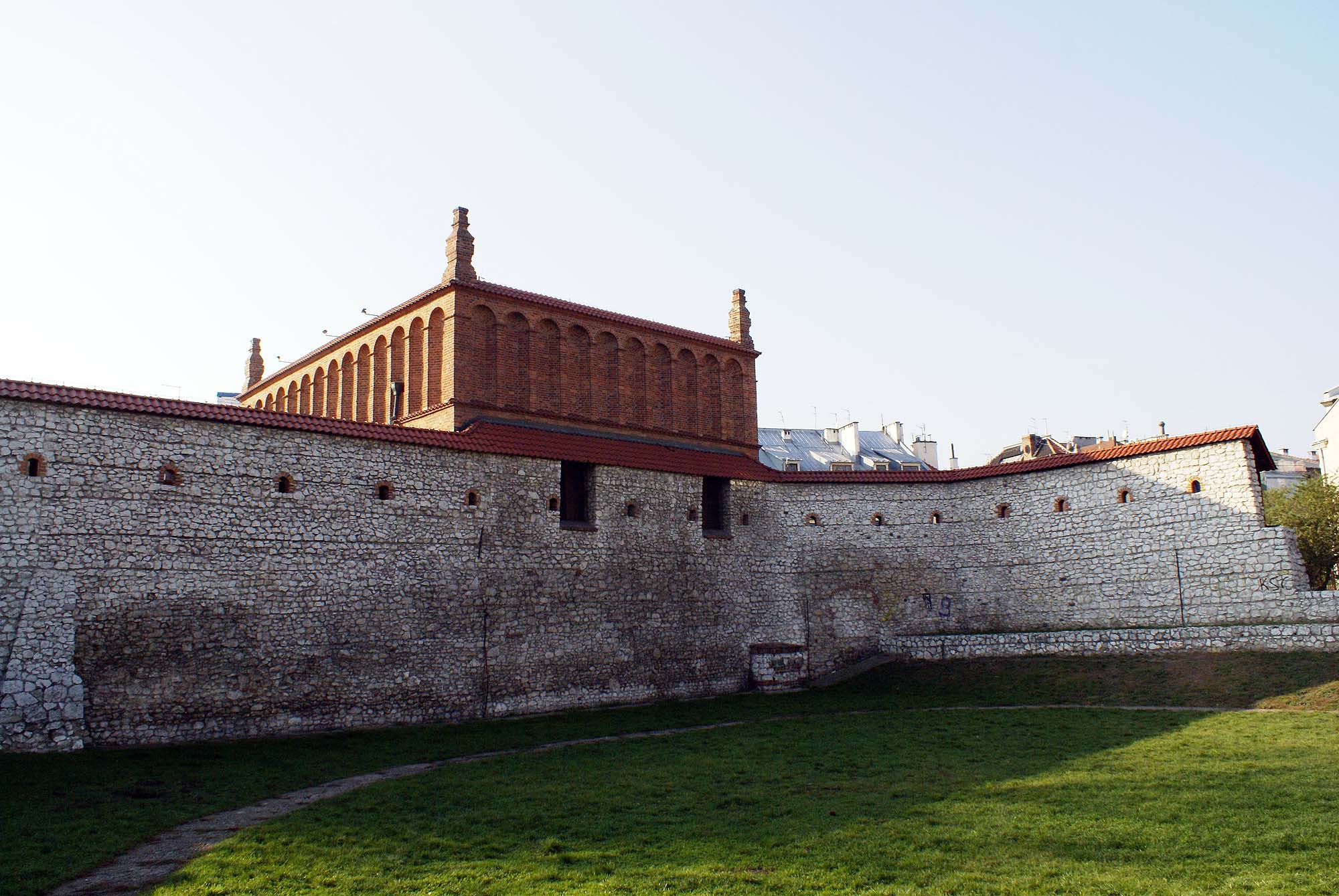
The 15th-century fortified Old Synagogue, Kraków in Poland

A fortress synagogue is a synagogue built to withstand attack while protecting the lives of people sheltering within it.

Fortress synagogues first appeared in the Polish–Lithuanian Commonwealth in the 16th century at a time of frequent invasions from the east by Ottoman, Russian and Wallachian troops. The now-destroyed Old Synagogue, Przemyśl was a typical example. The region also had fortified churches, of which St. Andrew's Church, Kraków is a surviving example.

The Old Synagogue, Kraków, a rare surviving fortress synagogue, was rebuilt in 1570 with an attic wall featuring embrasure and windows placed far above ground level, features borrowed from military architecture. It has been altered many times since.

Walls were thick masonry, with heavy buttressing to withstand assault. Like other fortifications, the synagogues were often built on hills. The Szydłów Synagogue is another example of a surviving, 16th-century fortress synagogue with rare combination of Gothic and Renaissance structural elements.

== See also ==
- Fortified church – the same concept applied to Christian churches
- Wooden synagogues in the Polish–Lithuanian Commonwealth – another style of synagogues in the Polish–Lithuanian Commonwealth
