= Szydłów =

- Town
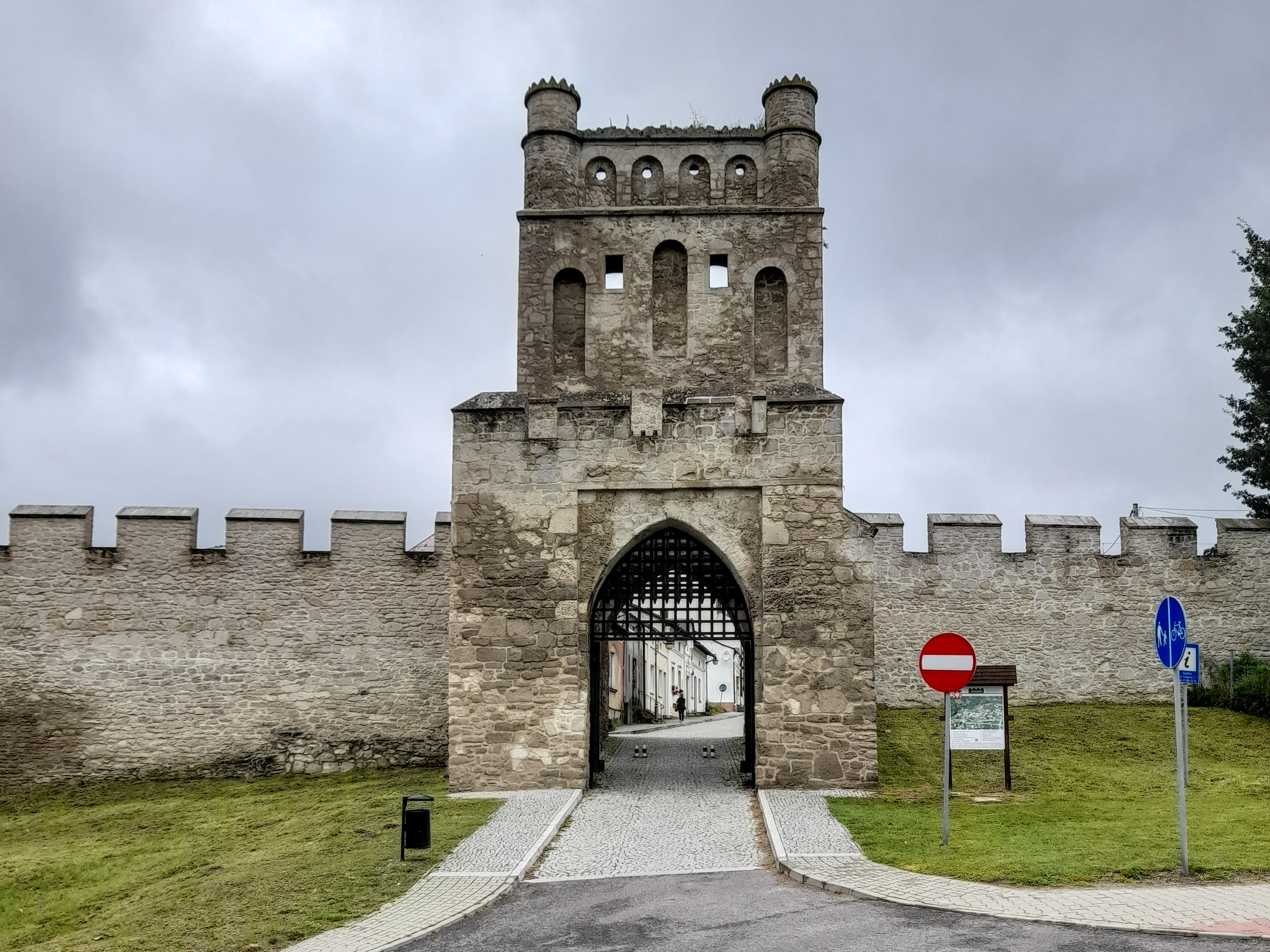
- The Kraków Gate in Szydłów

- Coat of arms

- Location within Poland
- Coordinates: 50°35′28″N 21°00′13″E
- Country: Poland
- Voivodeship: Świętokrzyskie
- County: Staszów
- Gmina: Szydłów
- Sołectwo: Szydłów
- First mentioned: 1191
- Town rights: 1329
- Elevation: 250.6 m (822 ft)

Population (31 December 2009 at Census)
  - Total: ▲1,093
- Time zone: UTC+1 (CET)
  - Summer (DST): UTC+2 (CEST)
- Postal code: 28-225
- Area code: +48 41
- Car plates: TSZ
- Website: www.szydlow.pl

Szydłów [ˈʂɨdwuf] is a fortified town in Staszów County, Świętokrzyskie Voivodeship, in southeastern Poland. It is the seat of the gmina (administrative district) called Gmina Szydłów. It lies approximately 13 km (8 mi) west of Staszów and 43 km (27 mi) south-east of the regional capital Kielce.

Szydłów's history dates to the 12th century. The town contains several tourist attractions, including several buildings and churches dating to the 14th century and the ruins of a castle from the same period, and the 16th-century Szydłów Synagogue.

== Location ==
Szydłów is located in Lesser Polish Upland, between the Świętokrzyskie Mountains and the Połaniec Plain. The village lies within borders of Chmielnik–Szydłów Protected Landscape Area. The distance to Kielce is 40 kilometers, to Staszów 12 kilometers. Due to numerous plum orchards, the village is called Plum Capital of Poland. Every year, the Plum Festival takes place here. The village is crossed by two regional roads—765th and 756th; furthermore, Szydłów is a stop along Lesser Polish Way.

== History ==
=== Medieval era ===
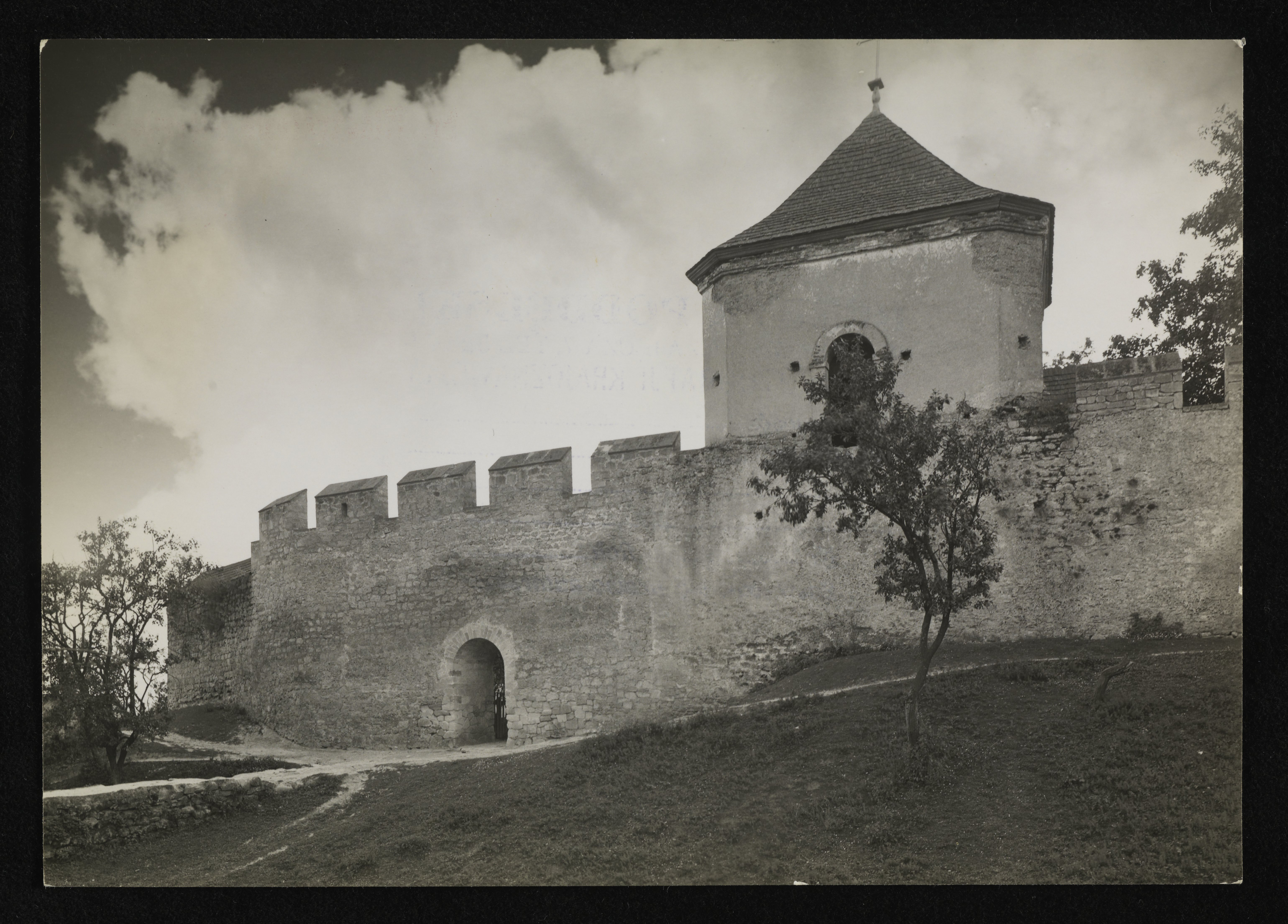
Szydłów town walls, c. 1936

First mention of Szydłów comes from the year 1191, in documents of Sandomierz Collegiate church. At that time, the village was owned by Polish Kings, located along the Vistula merchant road, which was of major importance in the late Middle Ages. On July 1, 1329, Szydłów was incorporated as a town on Środa Śląska town law (see also: Magdeburg rights).

In the mid-14th century, King Casimir III the Great founded here a fortified castle and the Church of Saint Ladislaus. The town was surrounded by a defensive wall, with three gates—Kraków Gate, Opatów Gate, and Water Gate. Soon afterwards, Szydłów became the seat of a starosta, and first artisans came here, as well as Jewish settlers. It was a royal town of the Kingdom of Poland, administratively located in the Wiślica County in the Sandomierz Voivodeship in the Lesser Poland Province. Its location helped wine, cattle and hops merchants, who would go with their goods to Sandomierz.

=== Modern era ===
In the 16th century, Szydłów emerged as a center of cloth-making. Also, tailors, bakers, shoemakers, iron smiths, saddle makers, sword makers and pot makers worked here, there also was a brewery. In 1528, waterworks and bath houses were opened, and in 1564, the town had 180 houses, of which 49 were located on the market square, but next year, large parts of Szydłów burned in a fire. At that time, a number Jews settled in the town, who in 1534–1564 built the first synagogue.

Good times came to an end in the first half of the 17th century. In 1630 Szydłów was burned by rebellious soldiers of fortune, who were not paid their salaries. Unable to enter the fortified town, the mercenaries set the suburbs on fire, and the blaze reached Szydłów. Swedish invasion of Poland (1655–1660), and the invasion of troops of George II Rakoczi (see Treaty of Radnot) brought almost complete destruction, after which town's population shrank from 1,300 to 350, and the number of houses was reduced to 54 (as for 1663). After these conflicts, Szydłów never recovered to its previous prosperity. In 1789, Szydłów had a stone town hall, 5 mills on the Ciekąca river and 196 houses, many of them abandoned. The castle was ruined, and by 1827, the number of houses grew to 202, and the population reached 1,550.

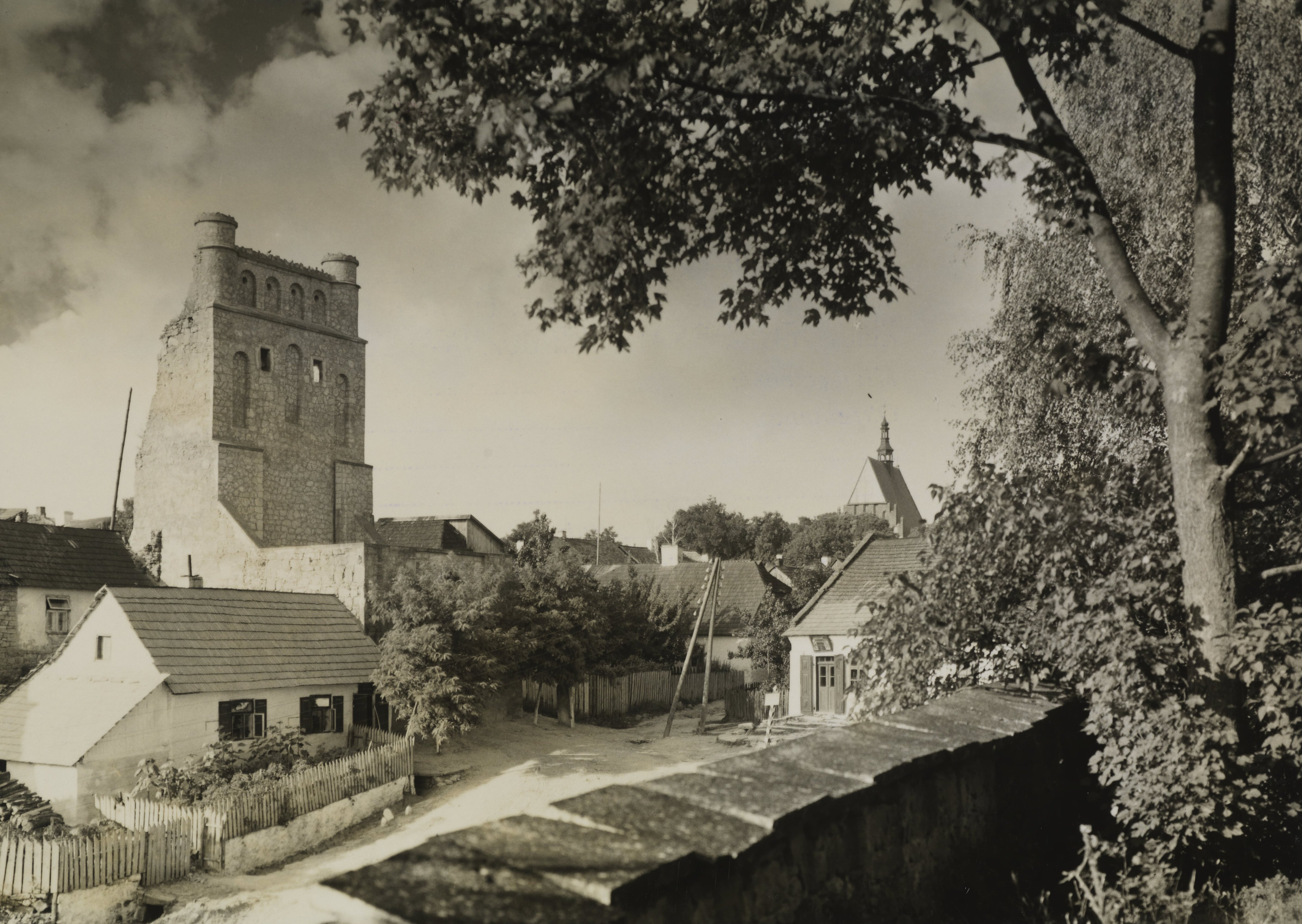
General view, c. 1936

After the Third Partition of Poland (1795), Szydłów was annexed by the Austrian Empire. After the Polish victory in the Austro-Polish War of 1809, it was regained by Poles and included within the short-lived Duchy of Warsaw, within which it became a county seat. After the duchy's dissolution in 1815, it became part of Russian-controlled Congress Poland, and in 1850, Russian authorities liquidated Szydłów County, merging it with Stopnica County. In 1869, as a punishment for participation of residents in the January Uprising, Szydłów was reduced to the status of a village. Following World War I, in 1918, Poland regained independence and control of Szydłów. Administratively, it was part of Kielce Voivodeship. According to the 1921 census, it had a population of 2,246, 74.1% Polish and 25.9% Jewish by declared nationality.

=== World War II ===
Following the joint German-Soviet invasion of Poland, which started World War II in September 1939, Szydłów was occupied by Germany until 1945. Part of the town, and almost all of its Jewish population, were destroyed. At the beginning of the war, between 500 and 600 Jews lived in the town. Immediately on occupying Szydłów, the Germans robbed and plundered Jewish homes and shops. They would randomly shoot and torture Jewish men. Men were also conscripted for forced labor. In 1940, Germans forced Jews from other towns in the region into Szydłów, doubling the Jewish population. By the end of 1941, more than 1000 Jews were in Szydłów with more Jews deported there periodically. In October 1942, 150 Jews were sent to labor camps, fifteen Jews were shot in Szydłów, and the remaining Jews, then numbering about 1000, were marched to the Szczucin train station and sent to the Treblinka extermination camp where they were immediately murdered. The number of Szydłów Holocaust survivors is unknown.

=== Post-war period ===
In 1960 the population was 1,402. On 1 January 2019, Szydłów regained its town status.

== Points of interest ==
- Medieval town center, with a 700-meter long defensive wall. Out of three gates, only Kraków Gate still exists.
- St. Stanisław Church (14th century)
- Gothic All Saints Church (14th–15th century)
- 14th-century Royal Castle in Szydłów, rebuilt in the 16th century. Main building of the complex is in ruins, currently the castle has a library and a museum. It is entered through a 17th-century gate.
- Ruins of the Holy Spirit Church and Hospital (16th century)
- Late-Renaissance synagogue (16th century), which now houses a Jewish Culture Museum. The first official inventory of important buildings in Poland, A General View of the Nature of Ancient Monuments in the Kingdom of Poland, led by Kazimierz Stronczyński from 1844 to 1855, describes the Szydłów Synagogue as one of Poland's architecturally notable buildings.
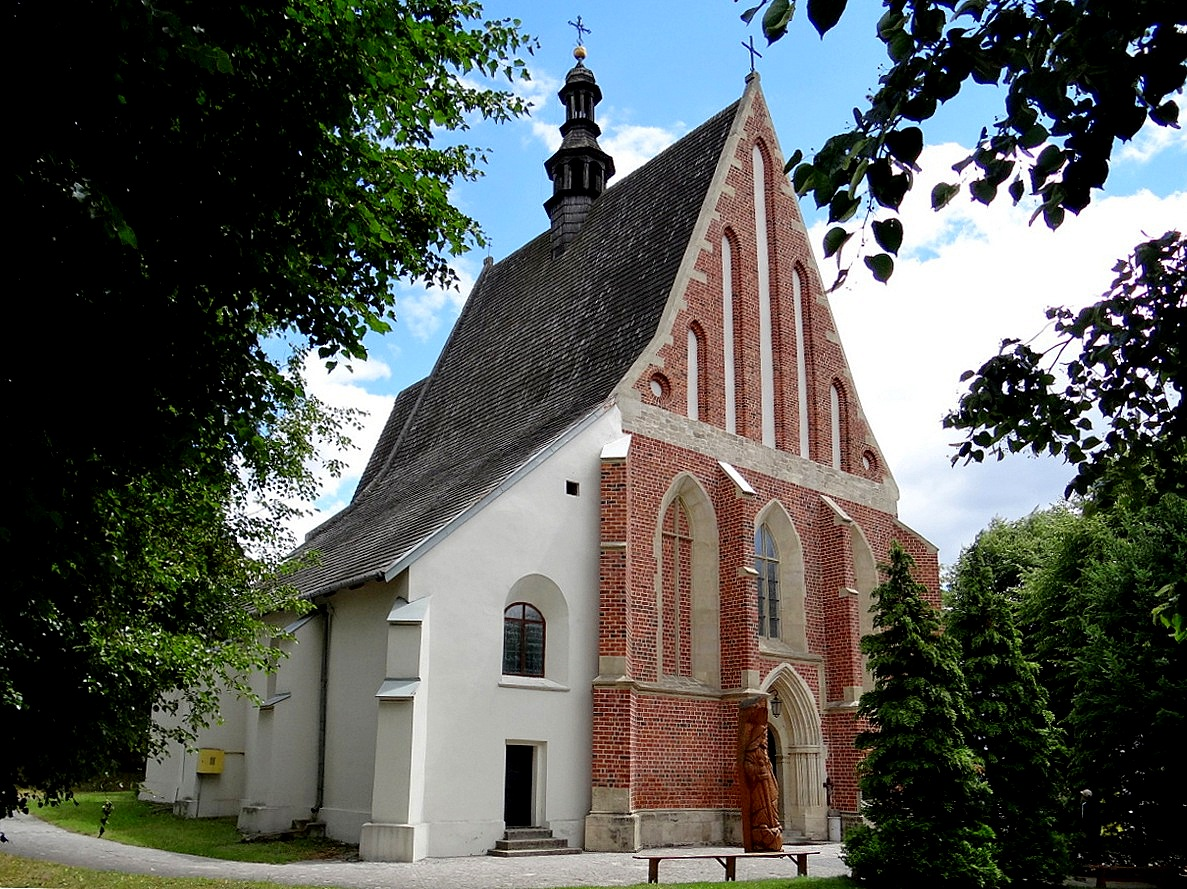
Saint Władysław Church

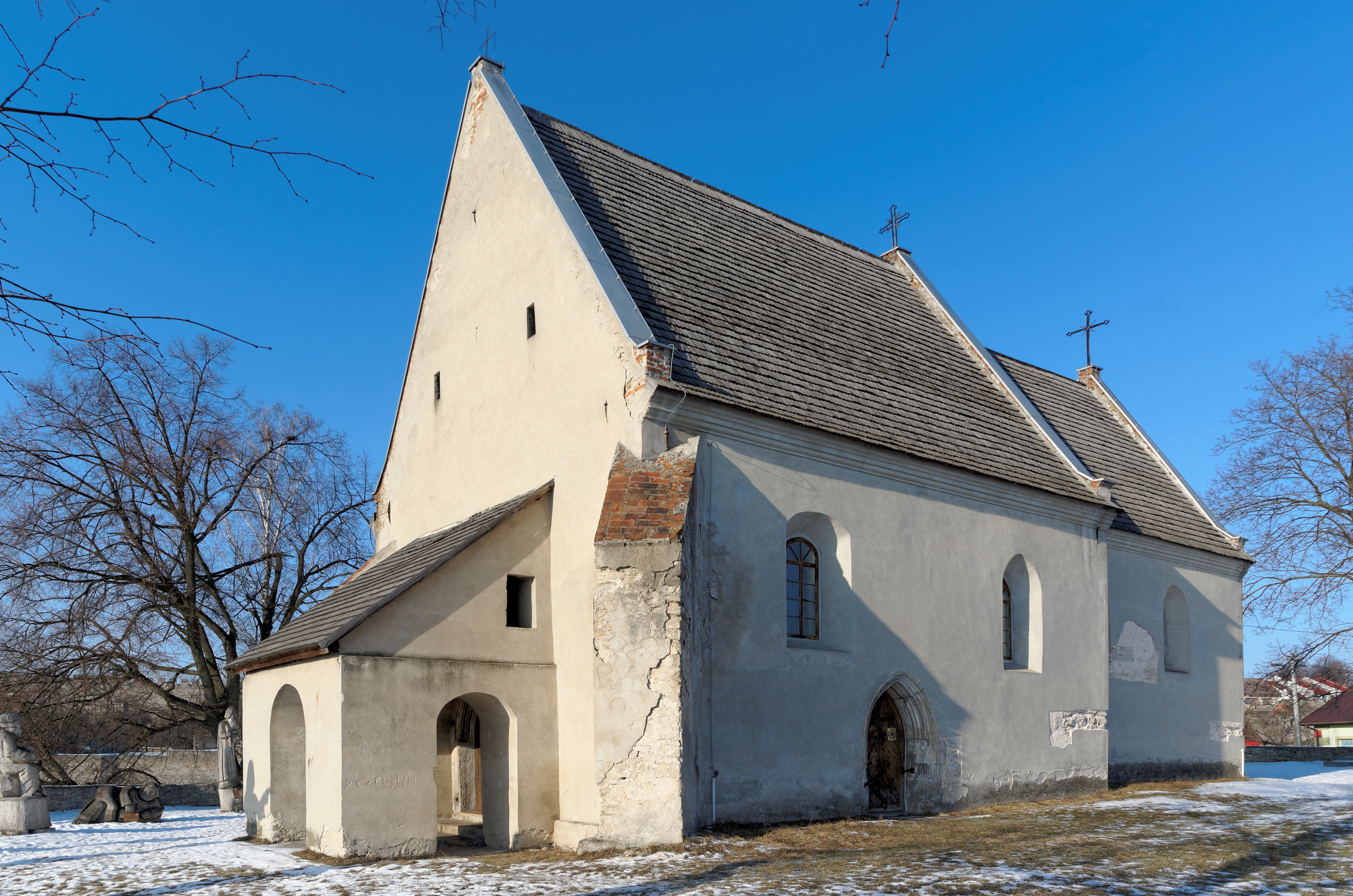
All Saints Church

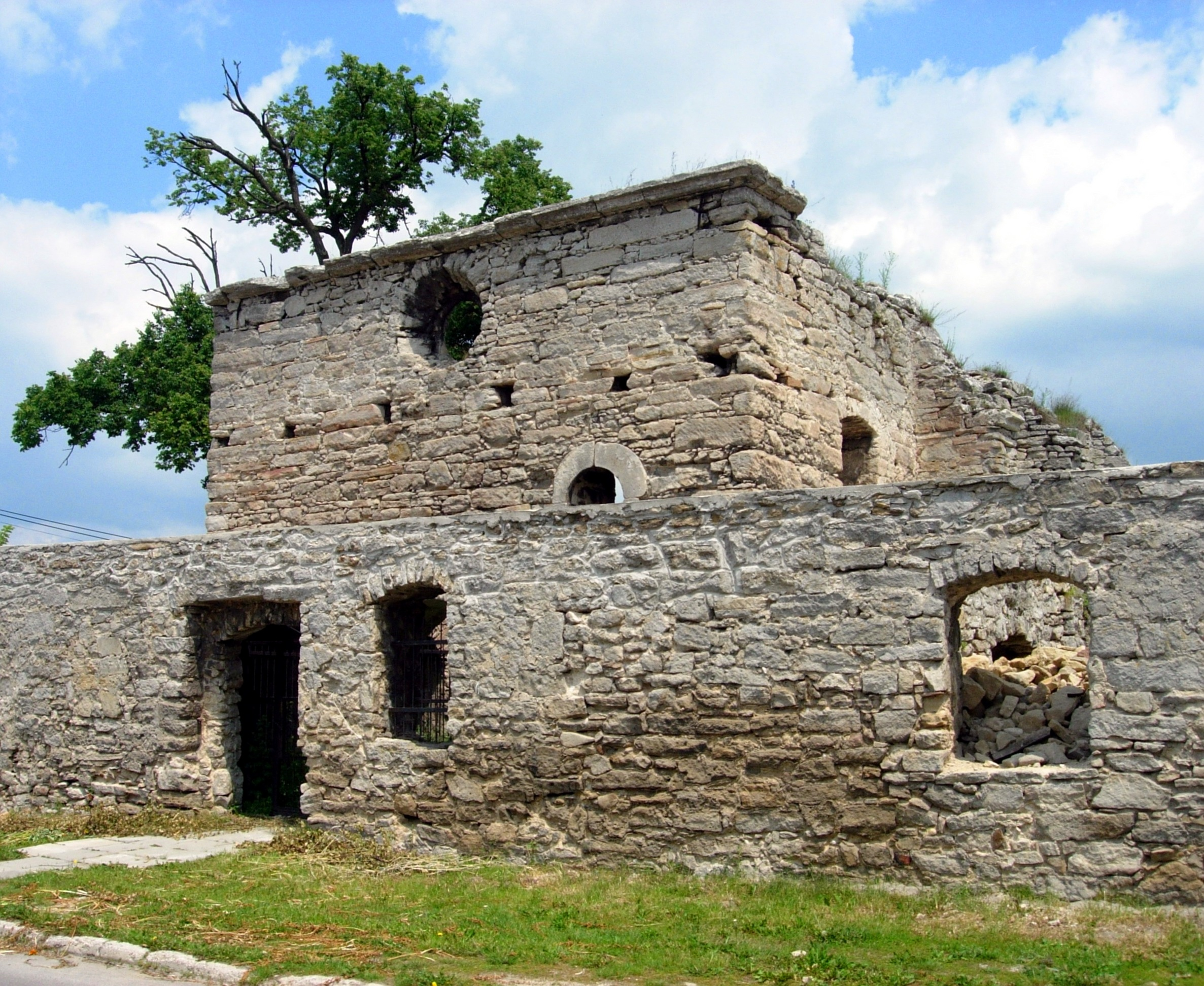
Old Church ruins

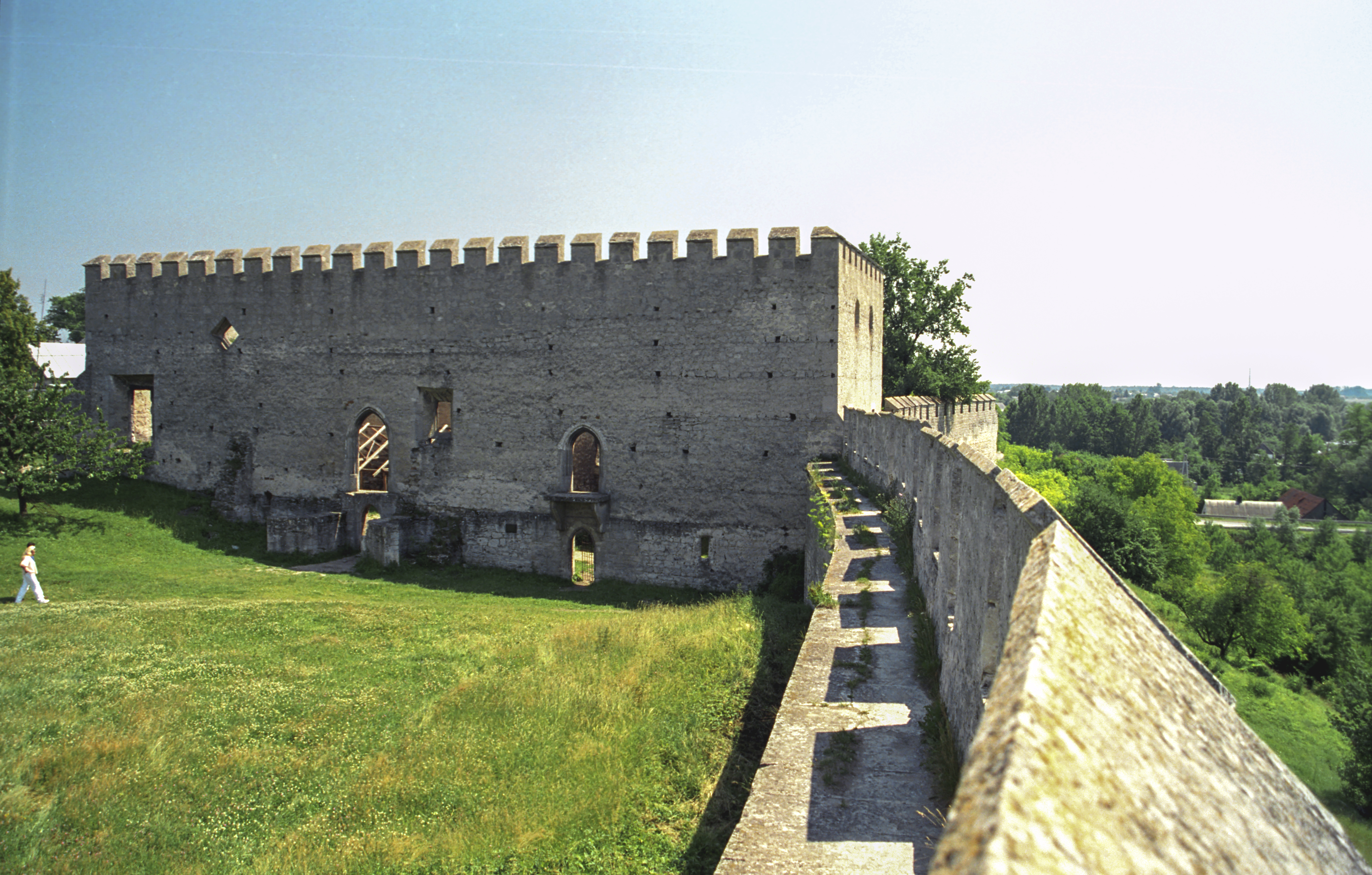
Courtyard of the Castle

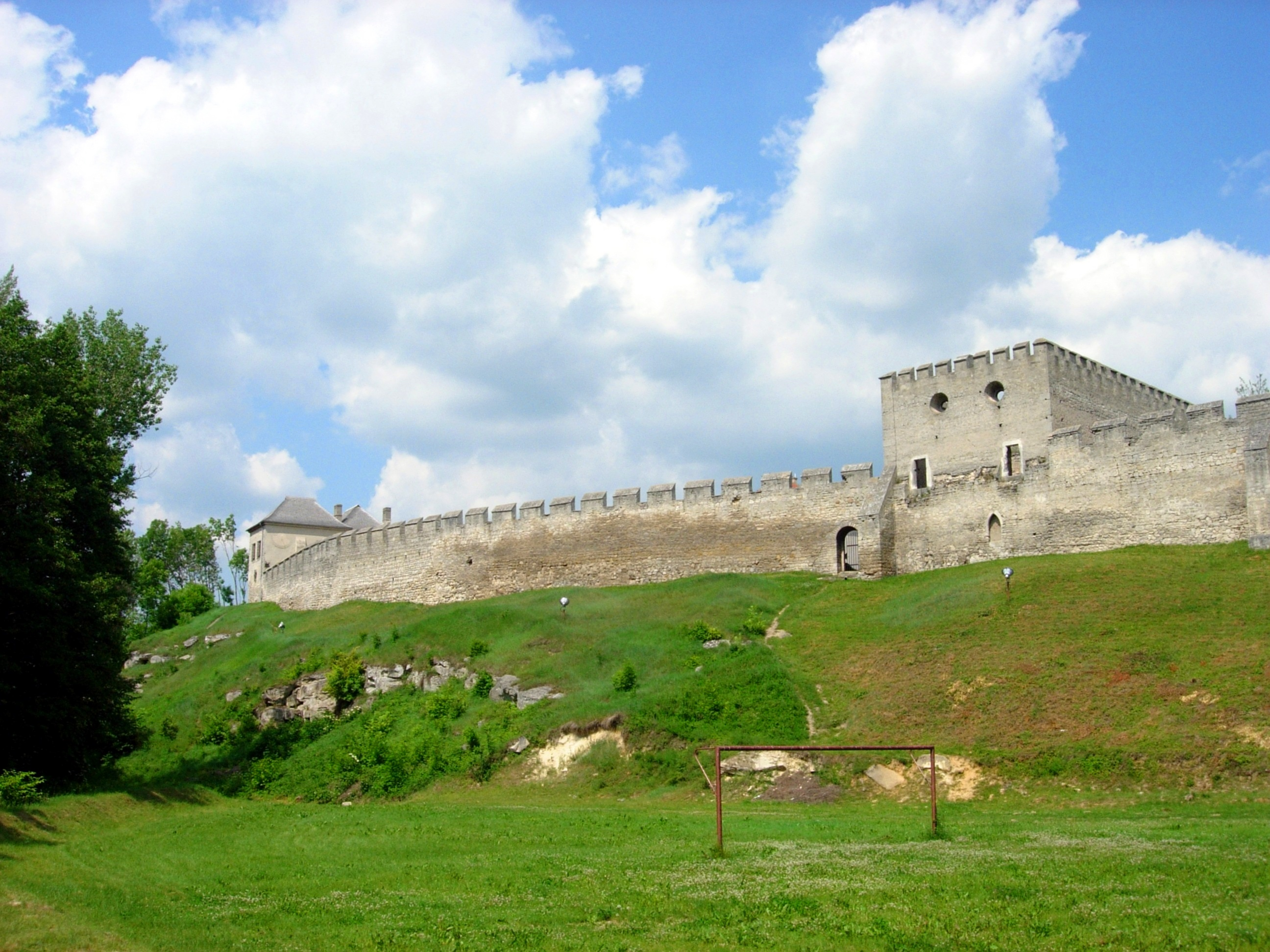
Szydłów Castle

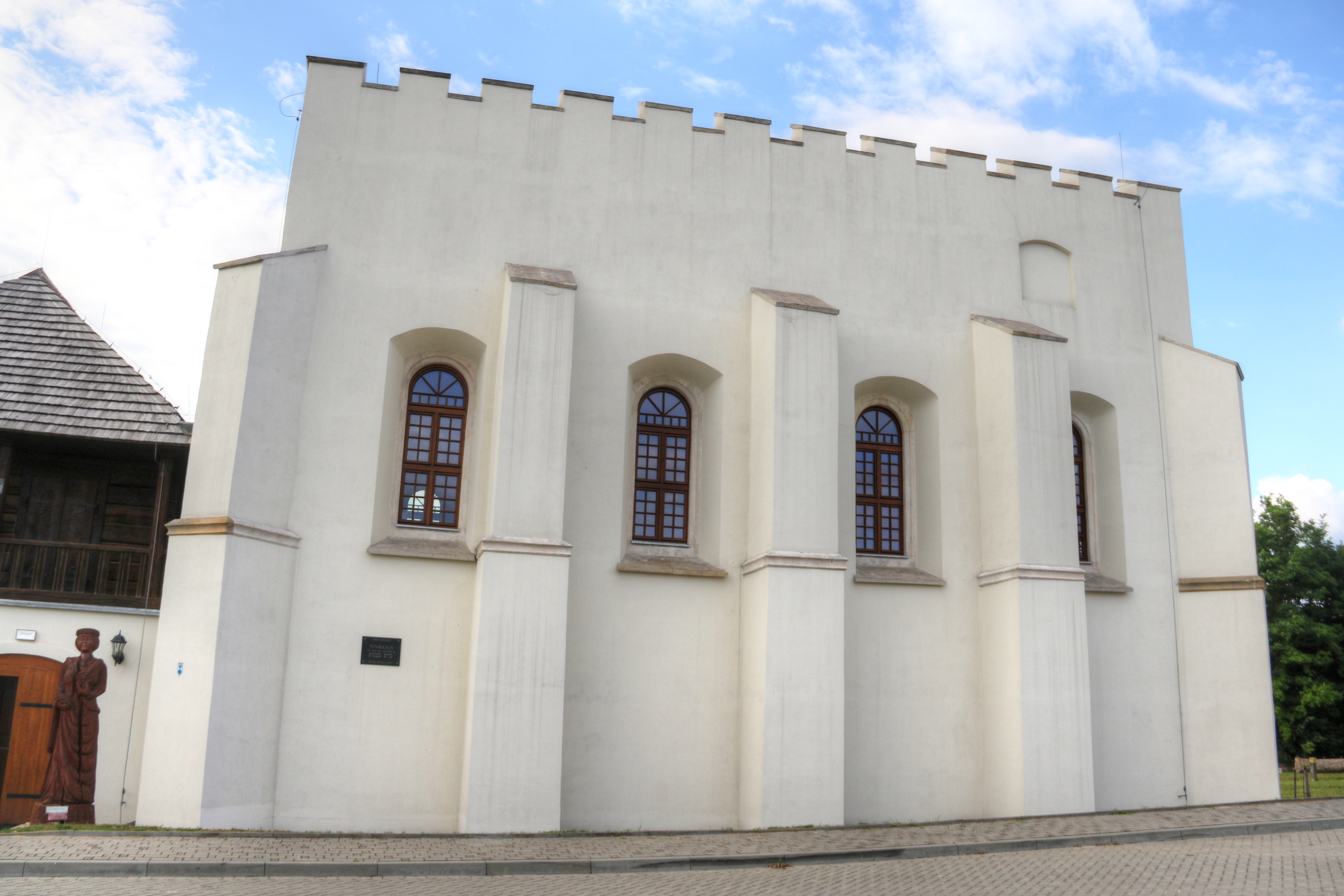
Szydłów Synagogue

== See also ==
- The Lesser Polish Way
