= Gromada Tursko Wielkie =

Polish group of villages

Gromada Tursko Wielkie is a group consisting of several villages, constituted the lowest tier of local government, taking over the role previously played by gmina Tursko Wielkie; at a smaller scale. In communist Poland between 29 September 1954 and 31 December 1972, this assembly was introduced. Gromada was the lowest (next to osiedle) administrative division of Poland.

The Gromadzka National Council was the group's executive organ. These units were created by the Communist Polish Law, and have legal authority.

The gromada continued to function in interwar Poland (administrative division of the Second Polish Republic. Sołectwo) is a subdivision of a gmina (as an auxiliary unit of a commune) from the second world war, to the end of 1954. At present sołectwo is the smallest unit of local government in rural Poland (subordinate to the gmina).

The gromada was originally the name of localities specific to the territorial council developed between the 15th and 18th centuries, and continued to function in Congress Poland.

As of 29 September 1952, Gromada Tursko Wielkie consisted of 13 villages: Matiaszów, Nakol, Niekrasów, Niekurza, Osala, Strużki, Sworoń, Szwagrów, Trzcianka Dolna, Trzcianka Folwarczna, Trzcianka Górna, Tursko Małe and Tursko Wielkie. As of 1 July 1952 the gmina Tursko Wielkie consisted of 13 gromadas: Luszyca, Matiaszów, Niekrasów Ukazowy, Niekurza, Okrągła, Ossala, Rudniki, Strużki, Sworoń, Trzcianka Górna, Tursko Małe, Tursko Wielkie and Zawada.

Table 1. Index of official names of localities and physiographic objects
Names of village — town	Names of part of village — town	Names of physiographic objects — nature of objects
I. Gromada TURSKO WIELKIE
1. Matiaszów	1. Górka; 2. Korea; 3. Podwale; 4. Staszówek	1. Jezioro Matiaszowskie — lake 2. Karczunek — field, meadow 3. Kępa Matiaszowska — field, meadows 4. Pastwisko — field 5. Pod Domem — field 6. Szwagroskie — field 7. Za Jeziorem — field
2. Nakol	1. Pod Mostem; 2. Pod Wałem	1. Dodawka — field 2. Ispy — field 3. Nakolskie — field 4. Pastwisko Nakolskie — field 5. Podpole — meadow 6. Przymiarki Nakolskie — bushes, pa- sture 7. Spory — meadow, field 8. Sworońskie Pole — field 9. Szacunek — meadow, field 10. Za Wałem — field
3. Niekrasów	1. Choiny; 2. Dąbrowa; 3. Za Górą	1. Berkówka – meadow, field 2. Choiny – field, bushes 3. Dąbrowa – field 4. Kalugi – field, meadows 5. Pod Cmentarzem – meadow 6. Stawiska – meadow 7. Strzegomka – brook
4. Niekurza	1. Glinki; 2. Koniec; 3. Rogatki	1. Glinczańskie — field 2. Glinki — field 3. Kępa Rządowa — bushes 4. Koniec — field 5. Morgi — field 6. Pastwiska — field 7. Pod Wałem — field 8. Przewóz — boat ferrying 9. Przymiarki — field 10. Rogatki — field 11. Wistki — field 12. Za Drogą — field 13. Za Stodołami — field 14. Zakręcie — lake 15. Żabno — bushes
5. Osala	1. Goleń; 2. Górki; 3. Kałki; 4. Lesisko Dolne; 5. Lesisko Górne; 6. Osala Dworska; 7. Pod Lasem; 8. Wądoły; 9. Wierzby	1. Cyple — meadow, bushes, field 2. Donica — wasteland, field, forest 3. Duże Kolonie — field 4. Jarząbek — meadow, field 5. Kałki — field, forest 6. Las Nakolski — forest 7. Las Niekrasowski — forest 8. Las Osalski — forest 9. Las Trzciański — forest 10. Lesisko Dolne — field 11. Lesisko Górne — field 12. Małe Kolonijki — field 13. Małoturskie Krzaki (Małuturskie Krzaki) — forest, wasteland 14. Pasterniki — meadow 15. Pod Lasem — field 16. Podłuże — field 17. Przymiarki — field 18. Stawiska — meadow 19. Torfiska — wasteland, field, pasture, swamp 20. Wądoły — field, wasteland, forest
6. Strużki	1. Gajówka	1. Karczmówka — field 2. Pod Stawkami — forest
7. Sworoń	1. Za Wałem	1. Pastwiska — field, meadow 2. Pod Baranem (Pod Baranami) — field 3. Rzeka Nakolska — brook 4. Rzeka Sworońska — brook 5. Za Wałem — meadow
8. Szwagrów	1. Dębiny; 2. Dęby; 3. Pod Wałem; 4. Połaniecka; 5. Za Wałem	1. Dębiny — field 2. Dęby — field 3. Jezioro — lake 4. Kępa — bushes 5. Koło Stawu — field 6. Lisy — sandbank 7. Pod Dębami – field 8. Pod Grubą Wierzbą – sandbank 9. Pod Jeziorem — field 10. Pod Starym Wałem — field 11. Pod Wałem — field 12. Połaniecka — road 13. Za Nowym Wałem — field, meadow 14. Za Starym Wałem — field 15. Za Wałem — field 16. Zagumnie — field, residue
9. Trzcianka Dolna	1. Bargielka	1. Choiny — field, forest 2. Na Lesie — field 3. Otoka — field 4. Pastwisko — field, meadow 5. Pliszka — meadow, field 6. Pod Jaworem — field 7. Podolszynie — field 8. Przymiarki — field, meadow 9. Rędzina — field 10. Skała — field 11. Suchy Grąd — meadow, field 12. Wisoki — meadow 13. Zagórze — field, meadow
10. Trzcianka Folwarcz- na	1. Gilówka; 2. Kolonia-Tursko Małe	1. Gilówka — field 2. Jeziórka — field, meadow 3. Krzywda — meadow 4. Morga — field 5. Pastwisko — pasture 6. U Sabatki — meadow
11. Trzcianka Górna	—	—
12. Tursko Małe	1. Kolonia; 2. Ogrody; 3. Rugałówka	1. Góry — field 2. Karczmarówka — field 3. Kolonia — field, meadow 4. Kopaliny — field, forest 5. Ogrody — field 6. Państwowe — field, meadow 7. Pasterniki — meadows 8. Rugałówka — field 9. Tarło — field, pasture 10. Turski Las — forest 11. Tursko Małe — grove 12. Zamczysko — forest 13. Zwierzyniec — meadow 14. Żabno — field, meadow, marsh
13. Tursko Wielkie	1. Karczmisko; 2. Kolonia Trzcianka; 3. Koziarówka; 4. Małe Kolonie; 5. Nowe Tursko; 6. Ochronka; 7. Ostatki	1. Bełko — lake 2. Dworskie — field 3. Dzierżawy — field 4. Kopie — bushes 5. Koziarówka — field, meadow 6. Lipie — forest 7. Lipny Gościniec — road 8. Małe Kolonie — field 9. Nowe Tursko — field 10. Pod Jeziorem — meadow 11. Skrzynka — lake 12. Za Janasem — pasture 13. Za Kopiem — field 14. Za Łaszycką — gromada's pasture 15. Za Skrzynką — field

== See also ==
- Gromada Osiek
