= Gromada Osiek =

Polish group of villages

Gromada Osiek is a former gromada (a type of administrative unit) in communist Poland between September 29, 1954 to December 31, 1972 It replaced the previously existing subdivision into gminas, replacing the former Gmina Osiek and including several previously existing gromadas: Osiek, Dębowo, Obórki, Jeziórki, Wrzeszewo, Łapinóż and Kolonia Osiek.

Gromadzka National Council was the executive organ of the gromada.

As of 29 September 1952 Gromada Osiek consisted of 10 villages: Długołęka, Kąty, Lipnik, Łęg, Mikołajów, Mucharzów, Osieczko, Osiek, Pliskowola and Suchowola. As of 1 July 1952 the gmina Osiek consisted of 14 gromadas: Długołęka, Grabowiec, Kąty, Lipnik, Łęg, Mikołajów, Mucharzów, Osieczko, Osiek, Pliskowola, Strzegom, Suchowola, Wiązownica Mała and Wiązownica Wielka.

Table 1. Index of official names of localities and physiographic objects
Names of village — town	Names of part of village — town	Names of physiographic objects — nature of objects
I. Gromada OSIEK
1. Długołęka	1. Otoczyna; 2. Otoka Gągolińska	1. Błonie — field 2. Długołęckie — field 3. Dodawki — field, meadow, wasteland 4. Karczma — pond 5. Kępa — meadow, bushes 6. Kowalówka — field 7. Olszyny — meadow, bushes, waste- land 8. Otockie — field 9. Plewiny — field 10. Żabieniec — meadow
2. Kąty	—	1. Błonie — field 2. Kępa — bushes, meadow 3. Pod Lipnikiem — field 4. Pod Łąkami — field 5. Podkole — field, meadow 6. Przydawki — field 7. Tomblica — sandbank 8. Zawalne — field 9. Żłóbek — pond
3. Lipnik	—	1. Błonie — field 2. Dąbrówki — field 3. Dół — field 4. Kąpaniec — lake 5. Kępa — bushes 6. Zajezierze — field 7. Zamienne — field 8. Zawalna Ziemia — field, meadows
4. Łęg	—	1. Bania — pond 2. Brzeźnica — field 3. Kaczanówki (Kaczanówka) — field, meadow, pasture 4. Łysa Górka — height, field 5. Szpitalówka — field 6. U Jeziora — field 7. Wątek — field, valley 8. Wolskie — field 9. Za Strugą — field
5. Mikołajów	—	1. Grzebowisko — wasteland 2. Poręby — meadows 3. Rędzina — field
6. Mucharzów	1. Smug	1. Borki — field, meadows 2. Ferencówka — field 3. Łazy — field 4. Łysa Góra — wasteland, sands 5. Mała Struga — field, meadow, bushes 6. Mrozowe Krzaki — bushes, defile 7. Pastwiska — field 8. Pod Niekrasówką — field 9. Smug — field
7. Osieczko	1. Gaj; 2. Grobla; 3. Osieczko-Kolonia; 4. Osiek-Kolonia; 5. Stawki; 6. Wójtostwo	1. Buchnia — meadow, bushes, bog 2. Działy — field 3. Gaj — field 4. Góry — field, wasteland, young forest 5. Grobla — field 6. Osieczko-Kolonia — field 7. Podjeziorze — field 8. Podlipnickie — field 9. Stawki — field 10. Wielgie Jezioro — lake 11. Zagumnie — field 12. Zajeziorze — field, meadow
8. Osiek	1. Dwór; 2. Gaj Osiecki; 3. Grabowiec; 4. Parysówka	1. Broźnia — forest 2. Buchnia — field 3. Chudyniówka (Chudzyniówka) — field 4. Dołki — field 5. Gaj Osiecki — field 6. Grabowiec — field, forest 7. Kacapówka — field, forest 8. Kozłówka — meadow 9. Ługi — field 10. Nakielec — field 11. Niwa — field 12. Parysówka — field 13. Pasierbowskie — field 14. Pastwisko — meadow 15. Pod Cmentarzem — field 16. Pod Kierkutem — field 17. Pod Wolą — field 18. Podgórki — field 19. Posusze — field 20. Rzeka — brook 21. Skotnia — field 22. Stawiska — meadow 23. Zagrądzie — field 24. Zagroble — meadow, field 25. Zagumnie — field
9. Pliskowola	1. Błonie; 2. Cyrglówka; 3. Dół; 4. Gajówka Pliskowol- ska 5. Góry; 6. Kały; 7. Mała Wola; 8. Podlesie; 9. Przerwa; 10. Skotnia; 11. Zabłonie	1. Błonie — bogs, ponds 2. Brodki — swamp, sands 3. Cenasiów Ogród — field 4. Cyrglówka — field 5. Dolskie Pola — field, meadow 6. Dół — field 7. Dziedziuchowe Dołki (Dzieduchowe Dołki) — forest 8. Gluzieniec — meadow, pasture 9. Góra Cyrglowska — field 10. Góra Stawiskowa — field 11. Górskie Pastwiska — field 12. Górskie Pola — field 13. Góry — field 14. Jamrozi Dół — defile 15. Kalaźnica — meadow 16. Kalugi — marsh, meadow 17. Kały — field, meadow 18. Łęczna Góra — forest 19. Ługi – field 20. Mała Wola — field 21. Małowolskie — field 22. Mogiła — forest 23. Pastwiska Dolskie — field, pasture 24. Piachy — wasteland 25. Pliska — meadow 26. Pliśnia Góra — field, wasteland 27. Pod Łęczną Górą — pasture, field 28. Pod Trzciańską Górą — pasture 29. Podlesie — field 30. Podleściańskie Pola — field 31. Porąbka — pasture 32. Poręby — meadow, field 33. Posada — field 34. Przerwa — field 35. Rakownica — forest 36. Skotnia — field 37. Stawiska — meadow, swamp 38. Smużek — forest 39. Strugi — field 40. Strzegomka — brook 41. Wierzchowiska — forest, alders forest 42. Zabłońskie Pola — field, meadow 43. Zajedle — forest
10. Suchowola	1. Górka; 2. Pod Osiekiem; 3. Podlesie	1. Dąbrowy — field 2. Działki — field 3. Gaj — field 4. Gajki — field 5. Jasień — field 6. Koło Szosy — field 7. Krzywa — meadow 8. Lizawy — meadow, bogs 9. Łęczna Góra — forest 10. Na Górach — field 11. Pastwisko pod Granicznikiem — field 12. Pod Cegielnią — meadow 13. Pod Lasem — field, bushes 14. Pod Łęczną Górą — field 15. Pod Osieczkiem — field 16. Pod Osiekiem — field 17. Porąbki — field 18. Rzeka — rivulet 19. Skały — field 20. Słonawy — field 21. Strugi — field, meadow 22. Strużele — field 23. Strużki — meadow 24. U Kościelnej Drogi — field 25. Za Gościńcem — field 26. Zagaje — field

== See also ==
- Gromada Tursko Wielkie
