= Kłoda =

Kłoda may refer to the following places in Poland:

- Kłoda, Lower Silesian Voivodeship (south-west Poland)
- Kłoda, Lublin Voivodeship (east Poland)
- Kłoda, Świętokrzyskie Voivodeship (south-central Poland)
- Kłoda, Masovian Voivodeship (east-central Poland)
- Kłoda, Leszno County in Greater Poland Voivodeship (west-central Poland)
- Kłoda, Piła County in Greater Poland Voivodeship (west-central Poland)

== People ==
- Samuel Kłoda (born 1998), Polish painter
