= Szczeka =

- Village
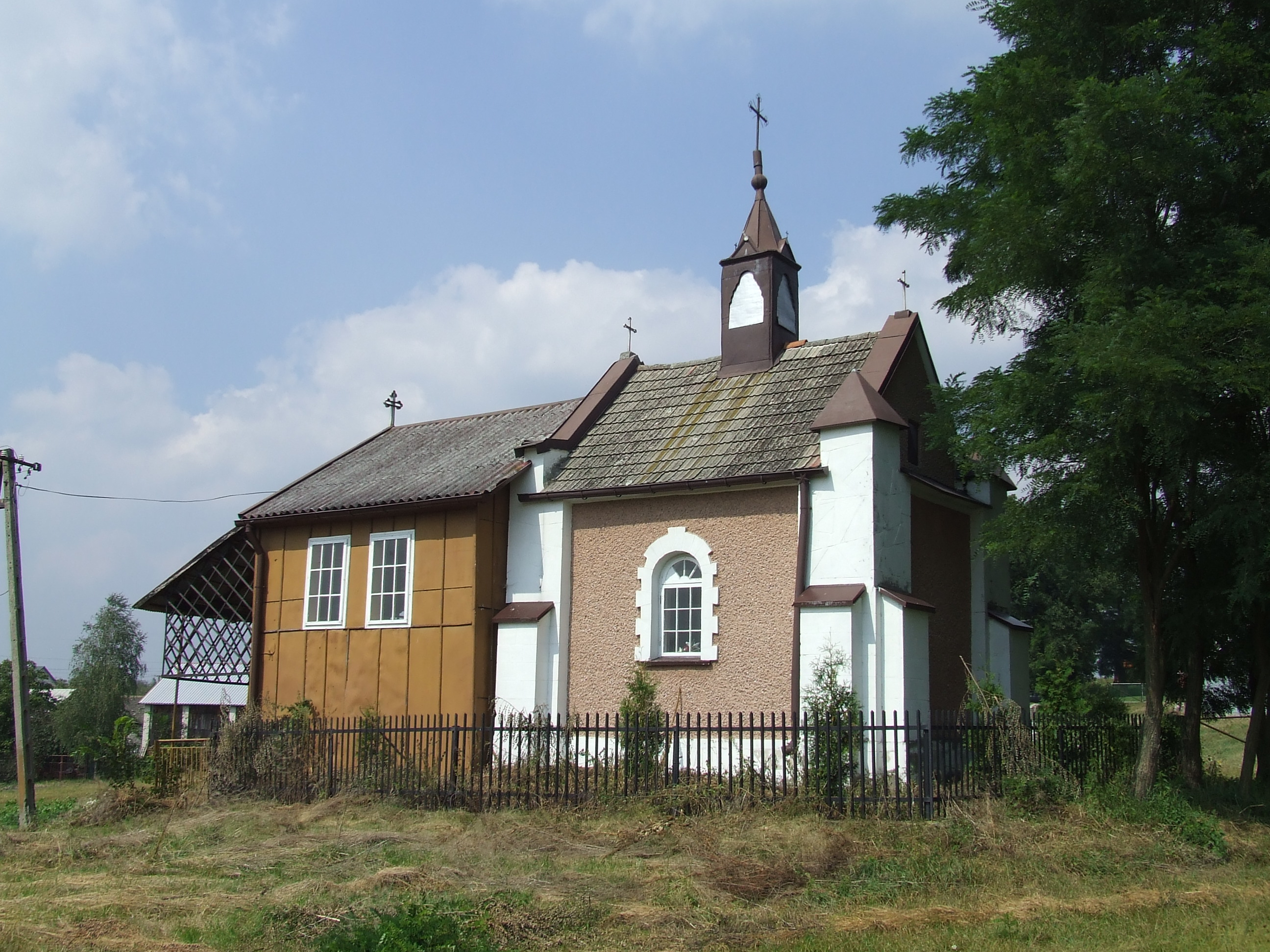
- Chapel

- Location within Poland
- Coordinates: 50°29′37″N 21°15′47″E
- Country: Poland
- Voivodeship: Świętokrzyskie
- County: Staszów
- Gmina: Rytwiany
- Sołectwo: Szczeka
- Elevation: 188.7 m (619 ft)

Population (31 December 2009 at Census)
  - Total: ▼430
- Time zone: UTC+1 (CET)
  - Summer (DST): UTC+2 (CEST)
- Postal code: 28-236
- Area code: +48 15
- Car plates: TSZ

Szczeka [ˈʂt͡ʂɛka] is a village in the administrative district of Gmina Rytwiany, within Staszów County, Świętokrzyskie Voivodeship, in south-central Poland. It lies approximately 6 km (4 mi) south-east of Rytwiany, 11 km (7 mi) south-east of Staszów, and 63 km (39 mi) south-east of the regional capital Kielce.
