= Podborek =

- Village
- Location within Poland
- Coordinates: 50°29′29″N 21°07′10″E
- Country: Poland
- Voivodeship: Świętokrzyskie
- County: Staszów
- Gmina: Rytwiany
- Sołectwo: Podborek
- Elevation: 185.4 m (608 ft)

Population (31 December 2009 at Census)
  - Total: ▲174
- Time zone: UTC+1 (CET)
  - Summer (DST): UTC+2 (CEST)
- Postal code: 28-236
- Area code: +48 15
- Car plates: TSZ

Podborek [pɔdˈbɔrɛk] is a village in the administrative district of Gmina Rytwiany, within Staszów County, Świętokrzyskie Voivodeship, in south-central Poland. It lies approximately 8 km (5 mi) south-west of Rytwiany, 9 km (6 mi) south-west of Staszów, and 57 km (35 mi) south-east of the regional capital Kielce.
