= Mikołajów, Staszów County =

Mikołajów
- Village
- Location within Poland
- Coordinates: 50°29′46″N 21°25′39″E
- Country: Poland
- Voivodeship: Świętokrzyskie
- County: Staszów
- Gmina: Osiek
- Sołectwo: Sworoń
- Elevation: 155.3 m (510 ft)

Population (31 December 2009 at Census)
  - Total: ▼4
- Time zone: UTC+1 (CET)
  - Summer (DST): UTC+2 (CEST)
- Postal code: 28-221
- Area code: +48 15
- Car plates: TSZ

Mikołajów [mikɔˈwajuf] is a village in the administrative district of Gmina Osiek, within Staszów County, Świętokrzyskie Voivodeship, in south-central Poland. It lies approximately 3 km (2 mi) south of Osiek, 20 km (12 mi) east of Staszów, and 72 km (45 mi) south-east of the regional capital Kielce.

The village has a population of ▼4.
