= Niedziałki =

Niedziałki may refer to the following places:

- Niedziałki, Masovian Voivodeship (east-central Poland)
- Niedziałki, Świętokrzyskie Voivodeship (south-central Poland)
- Niedziałki, Warmian-Masurian Voivodeship (north Poland)
