= Nakol =

- Village
- Location within Poland
- Coordinates: 50°29′06″N 21°25′54″E
- Country: Poland
- Voivodeship: Świętokrzyskie
- County: Staszów
- Gmina: Osiek
- Sołectwo: Sworoń
- Elevation: 151.5 m (497 ft)

Population (31 December 2009 at Census)
  - Total: ▼68
- Time zone: UTC+1 (CET)
  - Summer (DST): UTC+2 (CEST)
- Postal code: 28-221
- Area code: +48 15
- Car plates: TSZ

Nakol [ˈnakɔl] is a village in the administrative district of Gmina Osiek, within Staszów County, Świętokrzyskie Voivodeship, in south-central Poland. It lies approximately 5 km (3 mi) south of Osiek, 21 km (13 mi) south-east of Staszów, and 73 km (45 mi) south-east of the regional capital Kielce.

The village has a population of ▼68.
