= Anna Radziwiłł =

Polish politician (1939–2009)

- Trąby
- Born: 20 April 1939; Sichów Duży, Poland
- Died: 23 January 2009 (aged 69); Warsaw, Poland
- Education: Warsaw University
- Occupations: Historian, educator, politician
- Parent(s): Krzysztof Mikołaj Radziwiłł and Zofia Popieł

Anna Maria Radziwiłł (Polish pronunciation: [ˈanna raˈd͡ʑiviww]; 20 April 1939 – 23 January 2009) was a Polish historian, educator, and politician. She was a former member of the Polish Senate and Minister of Education, and was very active in educational reform and the underground educational movement during the Communist era in Poland.

== Biography ==
Radziwiłł was the daughter of Red Prince Krzysztof Mikołaj Radziwiłł and his wife, Zofia, born in Sichów Duży. In 1961, she graduated from the faculty of history of the Warsaw University, where she later earned her doctorate in humanities in 1966. Immediately after graduation, she started to work as a school teacher.

In 1967, she completed her studies and obtained the title of doctor of humanistic sciences for her study on Educational ideology of the Sanacja and its reflection in education policies of 1926-1939. Her work was to be published the following year by the Polish Scientific Publishers PWN, but in 1968, after the anti-intelligentsia campaign of the communist authorities, it was banned by the censorship.

She continued to work as a teacher of history and Polish language in various Warsaw-based schools. At the same time, she published a number of studies, mostly on history of education in Poland after 1945. Most of them were banned and were published underground, outside of the official system. In the 1970s, she also started cooperation with various undergrounds opposition newspapers, including Więź, Znak, and Res Publica.

After the legalization of the Solidarity movement, Anna Radziwiłł became one of its advisers. As such, she took part in various conferences between the communist authorities and the democratic opposition. The exact effect of these consultations was a reform of history education in Polish schools. For that she was awarded with the Golden Cross of Merit in 1981. However, the reform was finally halted by the introduction of martial law.

In the underground, she started her work on various handbooks to Polish 20th century history. Some of them were published by the underground printing presses and were used by, among others, the so-called Flying University. After the democratic reforms of 1989 and the ousting of the communist authorities, Anna Radziwiłł was elected on 6 June 1989 to the Senate of Poland. She also assumed the post of a sub-secretary of state in the ministry of education in Tadeusz Mazowiecki's government.

In 1992, she resigned her post and returned to university studies. Together with Wojciech Roszkowski, she prepared a set of history handbooks for primary schools and lycea (published after 1994), which became the most widely used history handbooks for the period between 1789 and 1990 in Poland.

In 1998, for her merits she was awarded with Commanders' Cross of the Polonia Restituta medal. In 1999, during the government of the Freedom Union-Solidarity Electoral Action coalition, Anna Radziwiłł returned to politics as an adviser to the minister of education. At the same time she became the deputy secretary of the Stefan Batory Foundation. Among her most notable duties was preparation of the reform of education in Poland. In 2001, she retired, but returned to public life as Deputy Minister of Education after being nominated by Mirosław Sawicki and confirmed.

== Death ==
She died on 23 January 2009 in Warsaw, aged 69, from undisclosed causes.

== Honours and awards ==
- Commander's Cross with Star of the Order of Polonia Restituta (posthumously, 2009; previously awarded the Commander's Cross, 1998)
- Gold Cross of Merit (1981)
- Medal of the National Education Commission (1991)
