= Sydzyna =

- Village
- Location within Poland
- Coordinates: 50°27′59″N 21°10′13″E
- Country: Poland
- Voivodeship: Świętokrzyskie
- County: Staszów
- Gmina: Rytwiany
- Sołectwo: Sydzyna
- Elevation: 170.8 m (560 ft)

Population (31 December 2009 at Census)
  - Total: ▼123
- Time zone: UTC+1 (CET)
  - Summer (DST): UTC+2 (CEST)
- Postal code: 28-236
- Area code: +48 15
- Car plates: TSZ

Sydzyna [sɨˈd͡zɨna] is a village in the administrative district of Gmina Rytwiany, within Staszów County, Świętokrzyskie Voivodeship, in south-central Poland. It lies approximately 8 km (5 mi) south of Rytwiany, 11 km (7 mi) south of Staszów, and 61 km (38 mi) south-east of the regional capital Kielce.
