= Pacanówka =

- Village
- Location within Poland
- Coordinates: 50°30′17″N 21°07′36″E
- Country: Poland
- Voivodeship: Świętokrzyskie
- County: Staszów
- Gmina: Rytwiany
- Sołectwo: Pacanówka
- Elevation: 190.3 m (624 ft)

Population (31 December 2009 at Census)
  - Total: ▼184
- Time zone: UTC+1 (CET)
  - Summer (DST): UTC+2 (CEST)
- Postal code: 28-236
- Area code: +48 15
- Car plates: TSZ

Pacanówka [pat͡saˈnufka] is a village in the administrative district of Gmina Rytwiany, within Staszów County, Świętokrzyskie Voivodeship, in south-central Poland. It lies approximately 6 km (4 mi) south-west of Rytwiany, 7 km (4 mi) south-west of Staszów, and 56 km (35 mi) south-east of the regional capital, Kielce.
