= Sichów Mały =

- Village
- Location within Poland
- Coordinates: 50°29′12″N 21°09′55″E
- Country: Poland
- Voivodeship: Świętokrzyskie
- County: Staszów
- Gmina: Rytwiany
- Sołectwo: Sichów Mały
- Elevation: 197.8 m (649 ft)

Population (31 December 2009 at Census)
  - Total: ▲396
- Time zone: UTC+1 (CET)
  - Summer (DST): UTC+2 (CEST)
- Postal code: 28-236
- Area code: +48 15
- Car plates: TSZ

Sichów Mały [ˈɕixuf ˈmawɨ] is a village in the administrative district of Gmina Rytwiany, Staszów County, Świętokrzyskie Voivodeship, Poland. It lies approximately 6 km (4 mi) south-west of Rytwiany, 9 km (6 mi) south of Staszów, and 60 km (37 mi) south-east of the regional capital Kielce.
