= Bukowa, Staszów County =

Bukowa
- Village
- Location within Poland
- Coordinates: 50°34′43″N 21°25′14″E
- Country: Poland
- Voivodeship: Świętokrzyskie
- County: Staszów
- Gmina: Osiek
- Sołectwo: Bukowa
- Elevation: 216.9 m (712 ft)

Population (31 December 2009 at Census)
  - Total: ▼330
- Time zone: UTC+1 (CET)
  - Summer (DST): UTC+2 (CEST)
- Postal code: 28-221
- Area code: +48 15
- Car plates: TSZ

Bukowa [buˈkɔva] is a village in the administrative district of Gmina Osiek, within Staszów County, Świętokrzyskie Voivodeship, in south-central Poland. It lies approximately 7 km (4 mi) north of Osiek, 19 km (12 mi) east of Staszów, and 67 km (42 mi) south-east of the regional capital Kielce.
