= Grobla =

Grobla may refer to the following places in Poland:

- Grobla, Lower Silesian Voivodeship (south-west Poland)
- Grobla, Radomsko County in Łódź Voivodeship (central Poland)
- Grobla, Lublin Voivodeship (east Poland)
- Grobla, Świętokrzyskie Voivodeship (south-central Poland)
- Grobla, Greater Poland Voivodeship (west-central Poland)
