= Ruda, Staszów County =

Ruda
- Village
- Location within Poland
- Coordinates: 50°28′31″N 21°14′34″E
- Country: Poland
- Voivodeship: Świętokrzyskie
- County: Staszów
- Gmina: Rytwiany
- Sołectwo: Ruda
- Elevation: 166.1 m (545 ft)

Population (31 December 2009 at Census)
  - Total: ▲353
- Time zone: UTC+1 (CET)
  - Summer (DST): UTC+2 (CEST)
- Postal code: 28-236
- Area code: +48 15
- Car plates: TSZ

Ruda [ˈruda] is a village in the administrative district of Gmina Rytwiany, within Staszów County, Świętokrzyskie Voivodeship, in south-central Poland. It lies approximately 7 km (4 mi) south-east of Rytwiany, 12 km (7 mi) south-east of Staszów, and 64 km (40 mi) south-east of the regional capital Kielce.
