= Łęg, Gmina Osiek =

Łęg
- Village
- Location within Poland
- Coordinates: 50°29′50″N 21°26′45″E
- Country: Poland
- Voivodeship: Świętokrzyskie
- County: Staszów
- Gmina: Osiek
- Sołectwo: Sworoń
- Elevation: 150.1 m (492 ft)

Population (31 December 2009 at Census)
  - Total: ▼1
- Time zone: UTC+1 (CET)
  - Summer (DST): UTC+2 (CEST)
- Postal code: 28-221
- Area code: +48 15
- Car plates: TSZ

Łęg [wɛnk] is a village in the administrative district of Gmina Osiek, within Staszów County, Świętokrzyskie Voivodeship, in south-central Poland. It lies approximately 4 km (2 mi) south of Osiek, 21 km (13 mi) east of Staszów, and 73 km (45 mi) south-east of the regional capital Kielce.
