= Niekrasów =

- Village
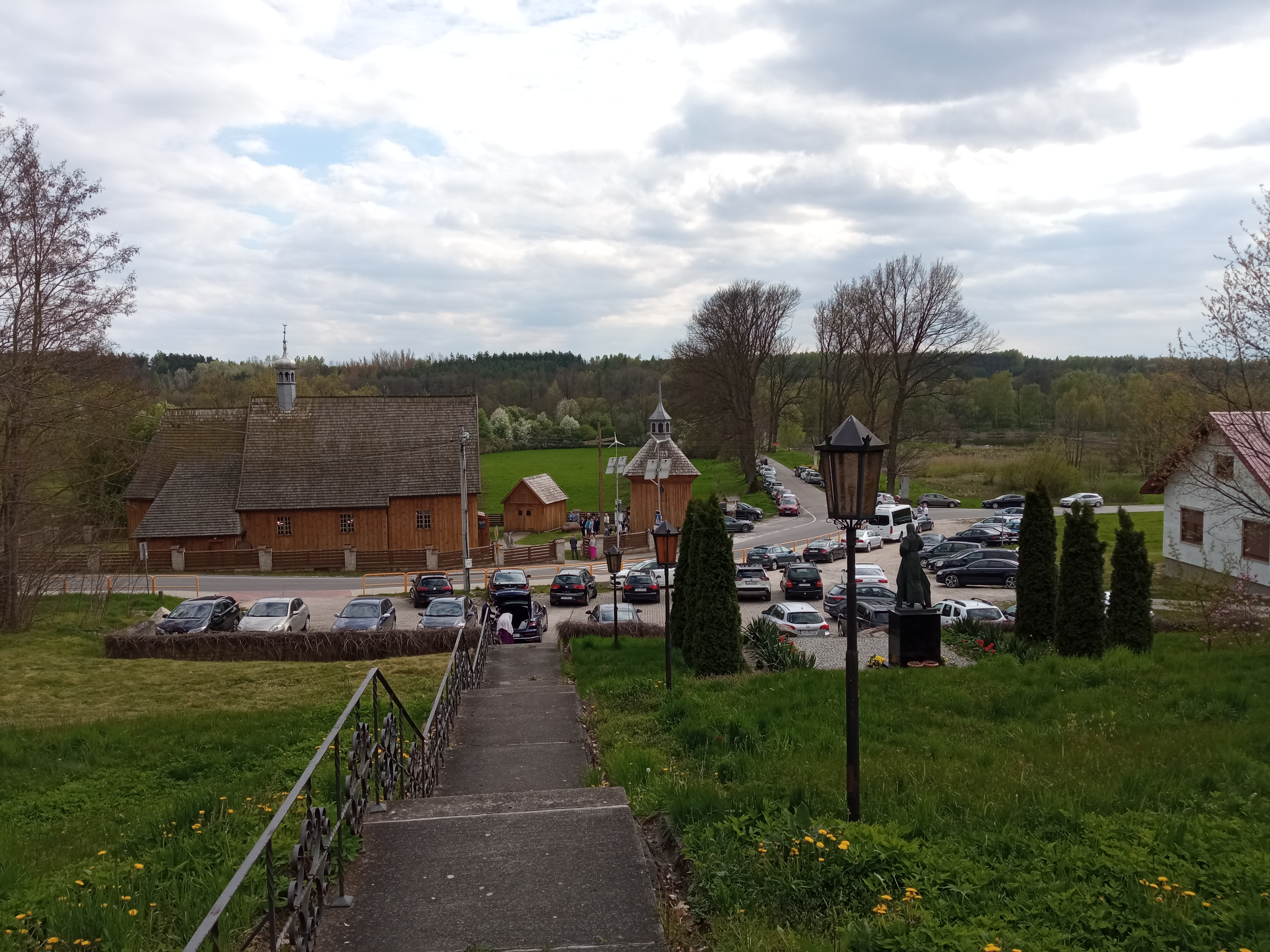

- Location within Poland
- Coordinates: 50°29′39″N 21°23′01″E
- Country: Poland
- Voivodeship: Świętokrzyskie
- County: Staszów
- Gmina: Osiek
- Sołectwo: Niekrasów
- Elevation: 176.1 m (578 ft)

Population (31 December 2009 at Census)
  - Total: ▲220
- Time zone: UTC+1 (CET)
  - Summer (DST): UTC+2 (CEST)
- Postal code: 28-221
- Area code: +48 15
- Car plates: TSZ

Niekrasów [ɲɛˈkrasuf] is a village in the administrative district of Gmina Osiek, within Staszów County, Świętokrzyskie Voivodeship, in south-central Poland. It lies approximately 6 km (4 mi) south-west of Osiek, 18 km (11 mi) south-east of Staszów, and 70 km (43 mi) south-east of the regional capital Kielce.

The village has a population of ▲220.
