= Kłoda, Świętokrzyskie Voivodeship =

Kłoda
- Village
- Location within Poland
- Coordinates: 50°30′03″N 21°13′26″E
- Country: Poland
- Voivodeship: Świętokrzyskie
- County: Staszów
- Gmina: Rytwiany
- Sołectwo: Kłoda
- Elevation: 177.1 m (581 ft)

Population (31 December 2009 at Census)
  - Total: ▲575
- Time zone: UTC+1 (CET)
  - Summer (DST): UTC+2 (CEST)
- Postal code: 28-236
- Area code: +48 15
- Car plates: TSZ

Kłoda [ˈkwɔda] is a village in the administrative district of Gmina Rytwiany, within Staszów County, Świętokrzyskie Voivodeship, in south-central Poland. It lies approximately 5 km (3 mi) south-east of Rytwiany, 9 km (6 mi) south-east of Staszów, and 62 km (39 mi) south-east of the regional capital Kielce.
