= Suchowola, Staszów County =

Suchowola
- Village
- Location within Poland
- Coordinates: 50°32′17″N 21°23′49″E
- Country: Poland
- Voivodeship: Świętokrzyskie
- County: Staszów
- Gmina: Osiek
- Sołectwo: Suchowola
- Elevation: 180.1 m (591 ft)

Population (31 December 2009 at Census)
  - Total: ▲1,097
- Time zone: UTC+1 (CET)
  - Summer (DST): UTC+2 (CEST)
- Postal code: 28-221
- Area code: +48 15
- Car plates: TSZ

Suchowola [suxɔˈvɔla] is a village in the administrative district of Gmina Osiek, within Staszów County, Świętokrzyskie Voivodeship, in south-central Poland. It lies approximately 4 km (2 mi) north-west of Osiek, 18 km (11 mi) east of Staszów, and 68 km (42 mi) south-east of the regional capital Kielce.

The village has a population of ▲1,097.
