= Gmina Osiek, Świętokrzyskie Voivodeship =

Gmina Osiek Osiek Commune
- Gmina
- Coat of arms

- Coordinates (Osiek): 50°30′56.51″N 21°23′56.45″E
- Country: Poland
- Voivodeship: Świętokrzyskie
- County: Staszów
- Seat: Osiek

Area (through the years 2006–2010)
  - Total: 129.30 km^{2} (49.92 sq mi)

Population (31 December 2010 at Census)
  - Total: 7,904
  - Density: 61.13/km^{2} (158.3/sq mi)
  - Urban: 2,001
  - Rural: 5,903
- Time zone: UTC+1 (CET)
  - Summer (DST): UTC+2 (CEST)
- Postal code: 28-221
- Area code: +48 15
- Car plates: TSZ

Gmina Osiek is an urban-rural gmina (administrative district) in Staszów County, Świętokrzyskie Voivodeship, in south-central Poland. Its seat is the town of Osiek, which lies approximately 21 kilometres (13 mi) east of Staszów and 71 km (44 mi) south-east of the regional capital Kielce.

The gmina covers an area of 129.30 square kilometres (49.9 sq mi), and as of 2010 its total population is ▼7,904 (out of which the population of Osiek amounts to ▲2,001, and the population of the rural part of the gmina is ▼5,903).

== Demography ==
According to the 2011 Poland census, there were 7,904 people residing in Osiek Commune, of whom 50.9% were male and 49.1% were female (out of which the population in rural areas amounts to 5,903, of whom 51.2% were male and 48.8% were female). In the commune, the population was spread out, with 21.2% under the age of 18, 39.3% from 18 to 44, 21.5% from 45 to 64, and 18% who were 65 years of age or older (out of which the population in rural areas amounts to 21.1% under the age of 18, 39.5% from 18 to 44, 20.9% from 45 to 64, and 18.5% who were 65 years of age or older).

Table 1. Population level of commune in 2010 – by age group
SPECIFICATION					Measure unit	POPULATION (by age group in 2010)																		
SPECIFICATION					Measure unit	TOTAL	0–4	5–9	10–14	15–19	20–24	25–29	30–34	35–39	40–44	45–49	50–54	55–59	60–64	65–69	70–74	75–79	80–84	85 +
I.	TOTAL				person	7,904	424	413	505	590	557	625	600	570	492	461	521	510	431	298	273	247	224	163
I.	—	of which in			%	100	5.4	5.2	6.4	7.5	7	7.9	7.6	7.2	6.2	5.8	6.7	6.5	5.5	3.7	3.5	3.1	2.8	2
I.	1.	BY SEX																						
I.	1.	A.	Males		person	4,020	221	217	254	300	277	334	315	320	270	261	279	261	211	153	102	106	81	58
I.	1.	A.	—	of which in	%	50.9	2.9	2.8	3.2	3.8	3.5	4.2	4	4	3.4	3.3	3.6	3.3	2.7	1.9	1.3	1.3	1	0.7
I.	1.	B.	Females		person	3,884	203	196	251	290	280	291	285	250	222	200	242	249	220	145	171	141	143	105
I.	1.	B.	—	of which in	%	49.1	2.5	2.4	3.2	3.7	3.5	3.7	3.6	3.2	2.8	2.5	3.1	3.2	2.8	1.8	2.2	1.8	1.8	1.3

Table 2. Population level in rural areas in 2010 – by age group
SPECIFICATION					Measure unit	POPULATION (by age group in 2010)																		
SPECIFICATION					Measure unit	TOTAL	0–4	5–9	10–14	15–19	20–24	25–29	30–34	35–39	40–44	45–49	50–54	55–59	60–64	65–69	70–74	75–79	80–84	85 +
I.	TOTAL				person	5,903	308	332	364	445	414	474	443	420	379	320	371	382	330	217	212	189	174	129
I.	—	of which in			%	100	5.2	5.6	6.2	7.5	7	8	7.5	7.1	6.4	5.4	6.3	6.5	5.6	3.7	3.6	3.2	2.9	2.2
I.	1.	BY SEX																						
I.	1.	A.	Males		person	3,020	166	173	177	235	210	252	236	240	220	184	197	198	158	106	81	89	57	41
I.	1.	A.	—	of which in	%	51.2	2.8	2.9	3	4	3.6	4.3	4	4.1	3.7	3.1	3.3	3.4	2.7	1.8	1.4	1.5	1	0.7
I.	1.	B.	Females		person	2,883	142	159	187	210	204	222	207	180	159	136	174	184	172	111	131	100	117	88
I.	1.	B.	—	of which in	%	48.8	2.4	2.7	3.2	3.6	3.5	3.8	3.5	3	2.7	2.3	2.9	3.1	2.9	1.9	2.2	1.7	2	1.5

Figure 1. Population pyramid of commune in 2010 – by age group and sex
Figure 2. Population pyramid in rural areas in 2010 – by age group and sex

Table 3. Population level of commune in 2010 – by sex
SPECIFICATION						Measure unit	POPULATION (by sex in 2010)		
SPECIFICATION						Measure unit	TOTAL	Males	Females
I.	TOTAL					person	7,904	4,020	3,884
I.	—	of which in				%	100	50.9	49.1
I.	1.	BY AGE GROUP							
I.	1.	A.	At pre-working age			person	1,672	865	807
I.	1.	A.	—	of which in		%	21.2	11	10.2
I.	1.	B.	At working age, grand total			person	4,807	2,655	2,152
I.	1.	B.	—	of which in		%	60.8	33.6	27.2
I.	1.	B.	a.	at mobile working age		person	3,104	1,643	1,461
I.	1.	B.	a.	—	of which in | %	39.3	20.8	18.5	
I.	1.	B.	b.	at non-mobile working age		person	1,703	1,012	691
I.	1.	B.	b.	—	of which in | %	21.5	12.8	8.7	
I.	1.	C.	At post-working age			person	1,425	500	925
I.	1.	C.	—	of which in		%	18	6.3	11.7

Table 4. Population level in rural areas in 2010 – by sex
SPECIFICATION						Measure unit	POPULATION (by sex in 2010)		
SPECIFICATION						Measure unit	TOTAL	Males	Females
I.	TOTAL					person	5,903	3,020	2,883
I.	—	of which in				%	100	51.2	48.8
I.	1.	BY AGE GROUP							
I.	1.	A.	At pre-working age			person	1,247	650	597
I.	1.	A.	—	of which in		%	21.1	11	10.1
I.	1.	B.	At working age. grand total			person	3,563	1,996	1,567
I.	1.	B.	—	of which in		%	60.4	33.8	26.5
I.	1.	B.	a.	at mobile working age		person	2,332	1,259	1,073
I.	1.	B.	a.	—	of which in | %	39.5	21.3	18.2	
I.	1.	B.	b.	at non-mobile working age		person	1,231	737	494
I.	1.	B.	b.	—	of which in | %	20.9	12.5	8.4	
I.	1.	C.	At post-working age			person	1,093	374	719
I.	1.	C.	—	of which in		%	18.5	6.3	12.2

== Villages ==
Apart from the town of Osiek, Gmina Osiek contains the villages and settlements of Bukowa, Długołęka, Kąty, Łęg, Lipnik, Matiaszów, Mikołajów, Mucharzew, Nakol, Niekrasów, Niekurza, Ossala, Ossala-Lesisko, Pliskowola, Strużki, Suchowola, Sworoń, Szwagrów, Trzcianka, Trzcianka-Kolonia and Tursko Wielkie.

== Neighbouring gminas ==
Gmina Osiek is bordered by the gminas of Baranów Sandomierski, Gawłuszowice, Łoniów, Padew Narodowa, Połaniec, Rytwiany and Staszów.
