= Trzcianka-Kolonia, Świętokrzyskie Voivodeship =

Trzcianka-Kolonia
- Colony
- Location within Poland
- Coordinates: 50°28′43″N 21°24′19″E
- Country: Poland
- Voivodeship: Świętokrzyskie
- County: Staszów
- Gmina: Osiek
- Sołectwo: Trzcianka-Kolonia
- Elevation: 150.9 m (495 ft)

Population (31 December 2009 at Census)
  - Total: ▼89
- Time zone: UTC+1 (CET)
  - Summer (DST): UTC+2 (CEST)
- Postal code: 28-221
- Area code: +48 15
- Car plates: TSZ

Trzcianka-Kolonia [ˈtʂt͡ɕaŋka kɔˈlɔɲa] (till December 31, 2001 as at Kolonia Trzcianka) is a colony in the administrative district of Gmina Osiek, within Staszów County, Świętokrzyskie Voivodeship, in south-central Poland. It lies approximately 6 km (4 mi) south-west of Osiek, 20 km (12 mi) south-east of Staszów, and 72 km (45 mi) south-east of the regional capital Kielce.

The village has a population of ▼89.
