= Strużki =

- Village
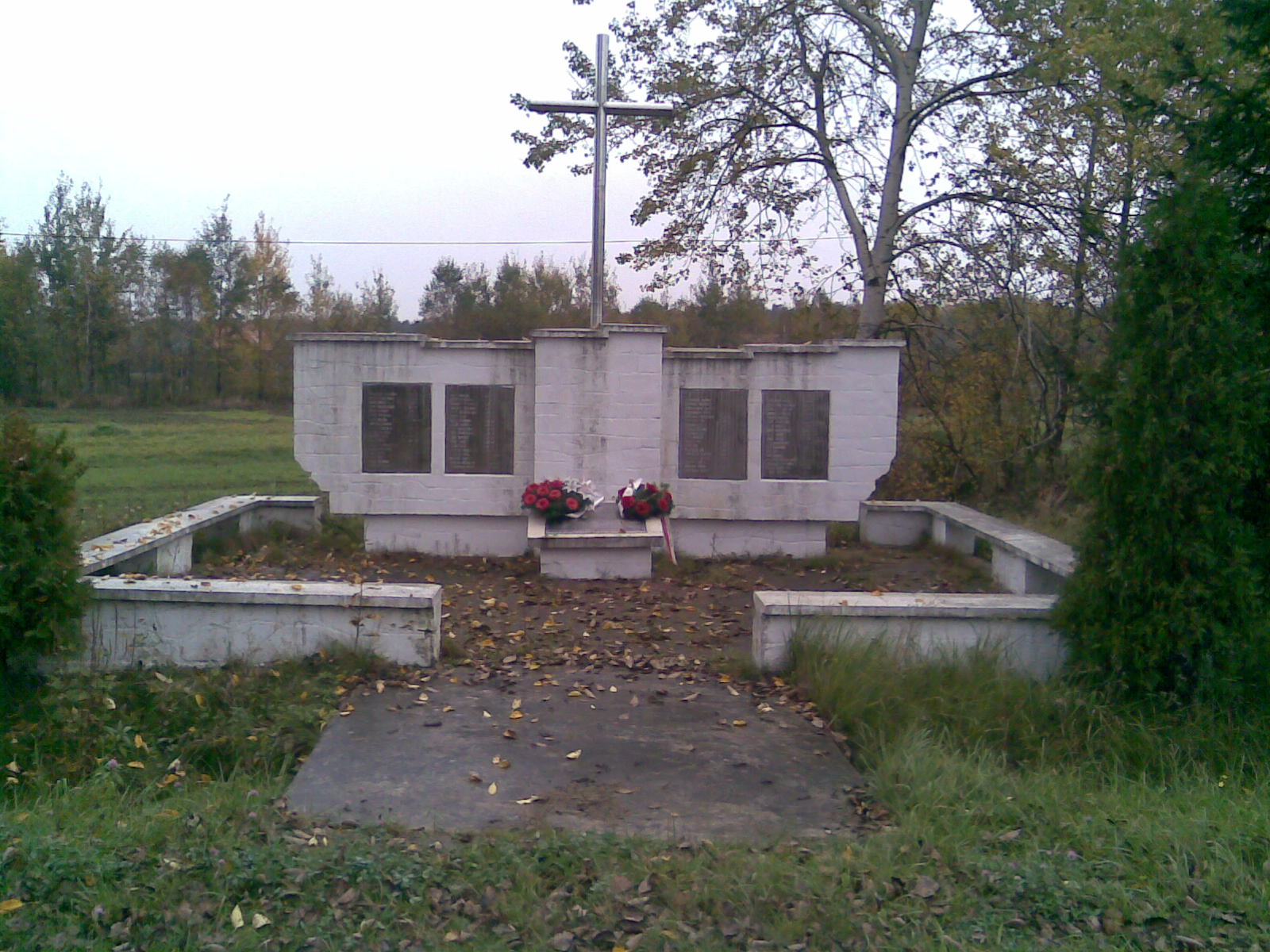

- Location within Poland
- Coordinates: 50°28′35″N 21°21′36″E
- Country: Poland
- Voivodeship: Świętokrzyskie
- County: Staszów
- Gmina: Osiek
- Sołectwo: Strużki
- Part of village: Villageship List: Gajówka
- Elevation: 184 m (604 ft)

Population (31 December 2009 at Census)
  - Total: ▲97
- Time zone: UTC+1 (CET)
  - Summer (DST): UTC+2 (CEST)
- Postal code: 28-221
- Area code: +48 15
- Car plates: TSZ

Strużki [ˈstruʂki] is a village in the administrative district of Gmina Osiek, within Staszów County, Świętokrzyskie Voivodeship, in south-central Poland. It lies approximately 8 km (5 mi) south-west of Osiek, 17 km (11 mi) south-east of Staszów, and 70 km (43 mi) south-east of the regional capital Kielce.

The village has a population of ▲97.
