= Długołęka, Świętokrzyskie Voivodeship =

Długołęka
- Village
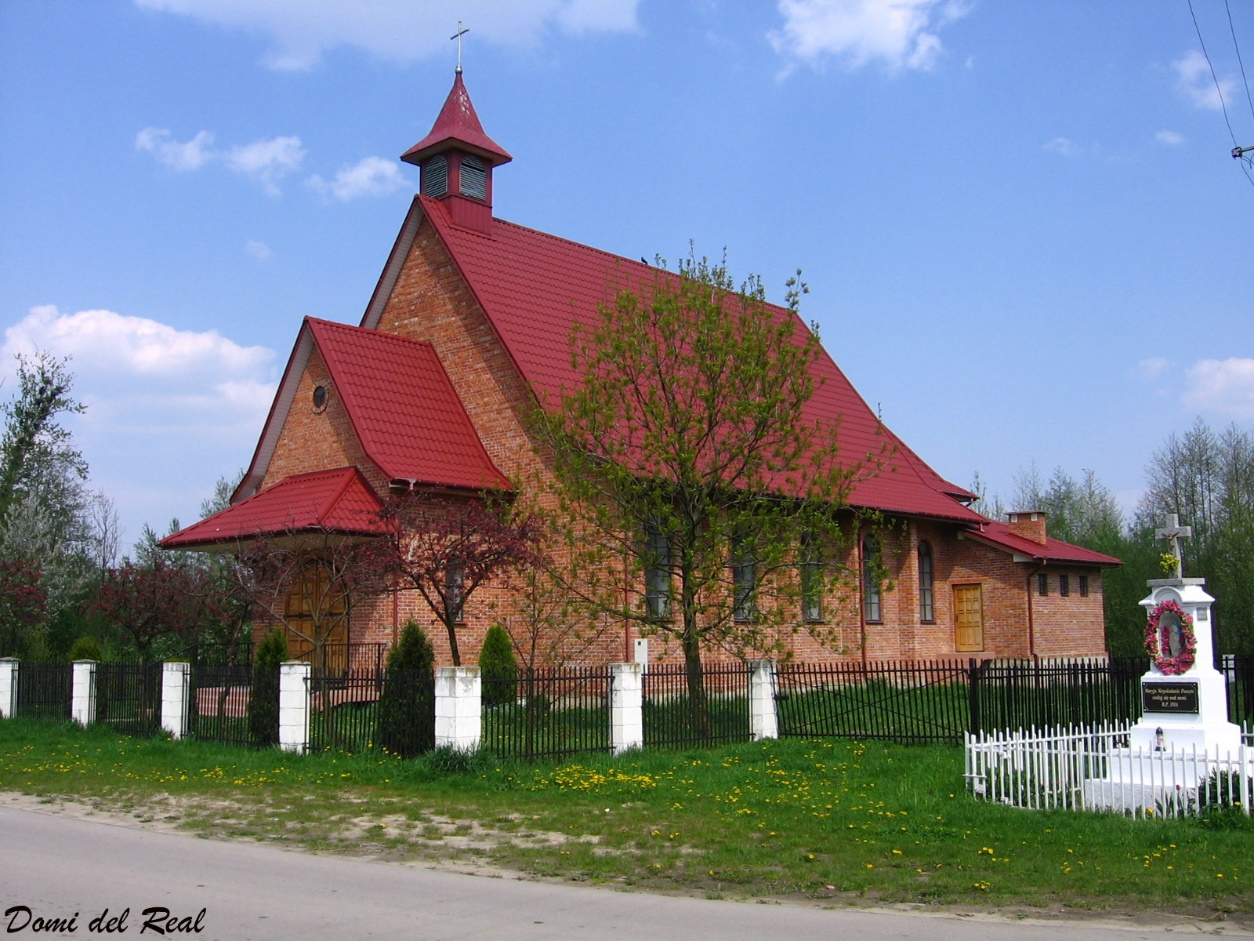

- Location within Poland
- Coordinates: 50°31′09″N 21°30′10″E
- Country: Poland
- Voivodeship: Świętokrzyskie
- County: Staszów
- Gmina: Osiek
- Sołectwo: Długołęka
- Part of village: Villageship List: Otoka Gągolińska
- Elevation: 149 m (489 ft)

Population (31 December 2009 at Census)
  - Total: ▲343
- Time zone: UTC+1 (CET)
  - Summer (DST): UTC+2 (CEST)
- Postal code: 28-221
- Area code: +48 15
- Car plates: TSZ

Długołęka (Polish pronunciation: [dwuɡɔˈwɛŋka]) is a village in the administrative district of Gmina Osiek, within Staszów County, Świętokrzyskie Voivodeship, in south-central Poland. It lies approximately 4 km (2 mi) east of Osiek, 24 km (15 mi) east of Staszów, and 75 km (47 mi) south-east of the regional capital Kielce.
