= Trzcianka, Staszów County =

Trzcianka
- Village
- Location within Poland
- Coordinates: 50°29′05″N 21°24′26″E
- Country: Poland
- Voivodeship: Świętokrzyskie
- County: Staszów
- Gmina: Osiek
- Sołectwo: Trzcianka
- Elevation: 153.4 m (503 ft)

Population (31 December 2009 at Census)
  - Total: ▲217
- Time zone: UTC+1 (CET)
  - Summer (DST): UTC+2 (CEST)
- Postal code: 28-221
- Area code: +48 15
- Car plates: TSZ

Trzcianka [ˈtʂt͡ɕaŋka] is a village in the administrative district of Gmina Osiek, within Staszów County, Świętokrzyskie Voivodeship, in south-central Poland. It lies approximately 5 km (3 mi) south-west of Osiek, 20 km (12 mi) south-east of Staszów, and 72 km (45 mi) south-east of the regional capital Kielce.

The village has a population of ▲217.
