= Mucharzew =

- Village
- Location within Poland
- Coordinates: 50°30′34″N 21°21′01″E
- Country: Poland
- Voivodeship: Świętokrzyskie
- County: Staszów
- Gmina: Osiek
- Sołectwo: Mucharzew
- Elevation: 195 m (640 ft)

Population (31 December 2009 at Census)
  - Total: ▼261
- Time zone: UTC+1 (CET)
  - Summer (DST): UTC+2 (CEST)
- Postal code: 28-221
- Area code: +48 15
- Car plates: TSZ

Mucharzew [muˈxaʐɛf] (till December 31, 2001 as at Mucharzów) is a village in the administrative district of Gmina Osiek, within Staszów County, Świętokrzyskie Voivodeship, in south-central Poland. It lies approximately 7 km (4 mi) west of Osiek, 15 km (9 mi) south-east of Staszów, and 67 km (42 mi) south-east of the regional capital Kielce.

The village has a population of ▼261.
