= Strzegom, Świętokrzyskie Voivodeship =

Strzegom
- Village
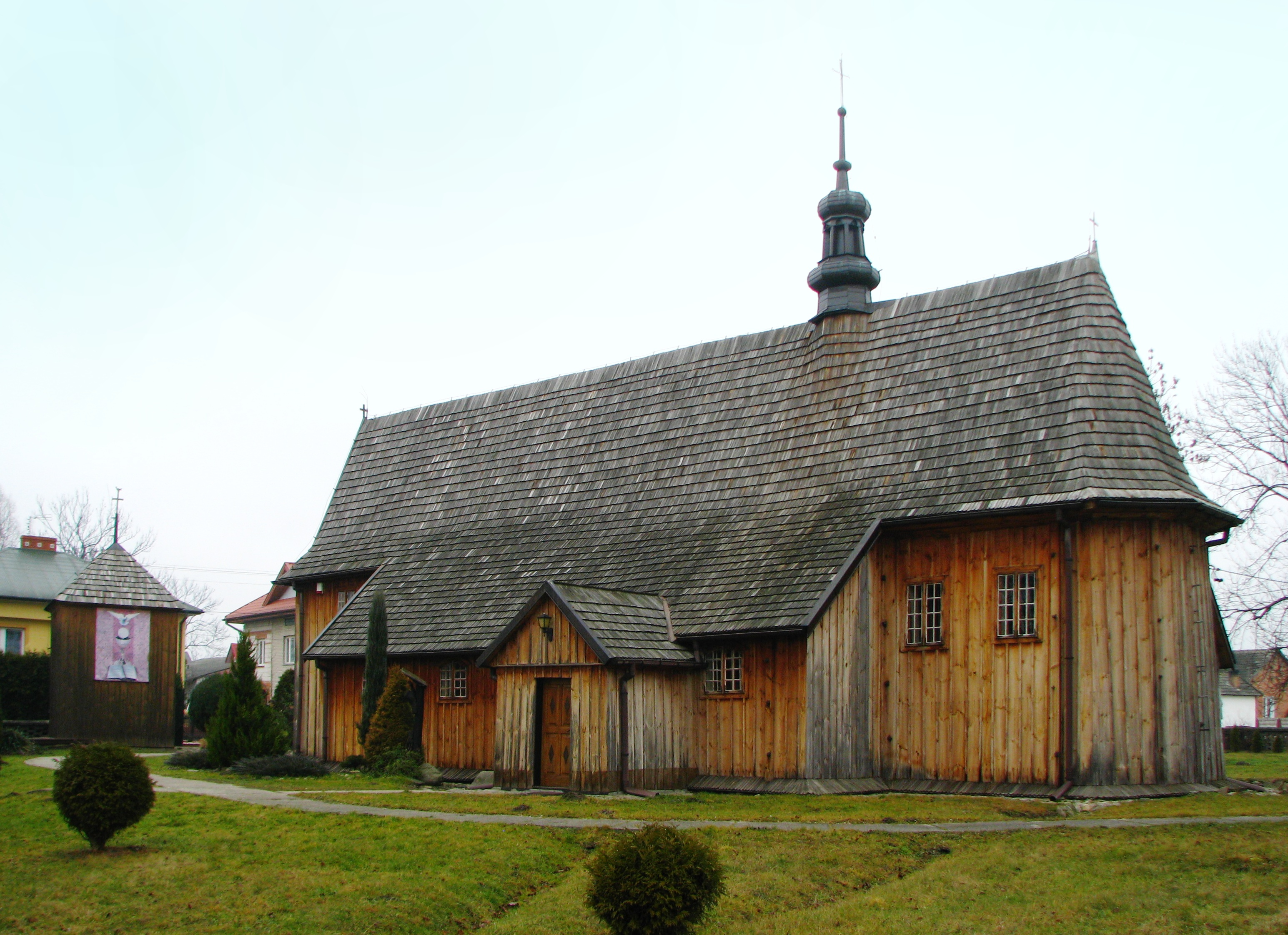
- Church of Our Lady of Sorrows

- Location within Poland
- Coordinates: 50°30′50″N 21°19′26″E
- Country: Poland
- Voivodeship: Świętokrzyskie
- County: Staszów
- Gmina: Rytwiany
- Sołectwo: Strzegom
- Elevation: 176.2 m (578 ft)

Population (31 December 2009 at Census)
  - Total: ▲495
- Time zone: UTC+1 (CET)
  - Summer (DST): UTC+2 (CEST)
- Postal code: 28-236
- Area code: +48 15
- Vehicle registration: TSZ

Strzegom [ˈstʂɛɡɔm] is a village in the administrative district of Gmina Rytwiany, within Staszów County, Świętokrzyskie Voivodeship, in south-central Poland. It lies approximately 9 km (6 mi) east of Rytwiany, 13 km (8 mi) south-east of Staszów, and 65 km (40 mi) south-east of the regional capital Kielce.

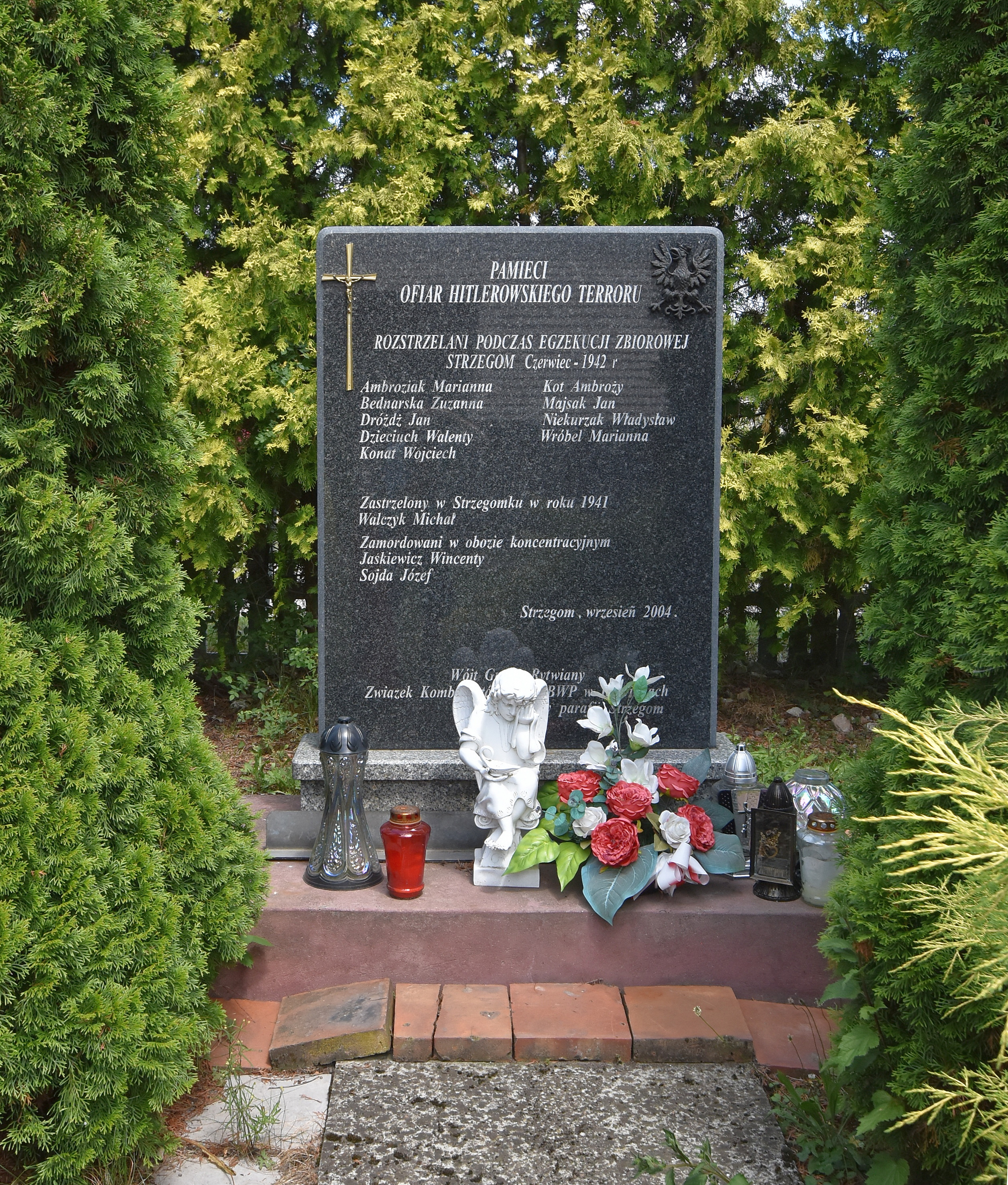
Memorial to local victims of Nazi Germany from World War II
