= Niedziałki, Świętokrzyskie Voivodeship =

Niedziałki
- Village
- Location within Poland
- Coordinates: 50°28′46″N 21°15′50″E
- Country: Poland
- Voivodeship: Świętokrzyskie
- County: Staszów
- Gmina: Rytwiany
- Sołectwo: Niedziałki
- Elevation: 166.6 m (547 ft)

Population (31 December 2009 at Census)
  - Total: ▲195
- Time zone: UTC+1 (CET)
  - Summer (DST): UTC+2 (CEST)
- Postal code: 28-236
- Area code: +48 15
- Car plates: TSZ

Niedziałki [ɲɛˈd͡ʑau̯ki] is a village in the administrative district of Gmina Rytwiany, within Staszów County, Świętokrzyskie Voivodeship, in south-central Poland. It lies approximately 7 km (4 mi) south-east of Rytwiany, 12 km (7 mi) south-east of Staszów, and 65 km (40 mi) south-east of the regional capital Kielce.
