= Niekurza =

- Village
- Location within Poland
- Coordinates: 50°26′47″N 21°23′43″E
- Country: Poland
- Voivodeship: Świętokrzyskie
- County: Staszów
- Gmina: Osiek
- Sołectwo: Niekurza
- Elevation: 153 m (502 ft)

Population (31 December 2009 at Census)
  - Total: ▼238
- Time zone: UTC+1 (CET)
  - Summer (DST): UTC+2 (CEST)
- Postal code: 28-221
- Area code: +48 15
- Car plates: TSZ

Niekurza [ɲɛˈkuʐa] is a village in the administrative district of Gmina Osiek, within Staszów County, Świętokrzyskie Voivodeship, in south-central Poland. It lies approximately 10 km (6 mi) south-west of Osiek, 21 km (13 mi) south-east of Staszów, and 74 km (46 mi) south-east of the regional capital Kielce.

The village has a population of ▼238.
