= Kąty, Staszów County =

Kąty
- Village
- Location within Poland
- Coordinates: 50°30′30″N 21°28′44″E
- Country: Poland
- Voivodeship: Świętokrzyskie
- County: Staszów
- Gmina: Osiek
- Sołectwo: Kąty
- Elevation: 150 m (490 ft)

Population (31 December 2009 at Census)
  - Total: ▲82
- Time zone: UTC+1 (CET)
  - Summer (DST): UTC+2 (CEST)
- Postal code: 28-221
- Area code: +48 15
- Car plates: TSZ

Kąty [ˈkɔntɨ] is a village in the administrative district of Gmina Osiek, within Staszów County, Świętokrzyskie Voivodeship, in south-central Poland. It lies approximately 3 km (2 mi) south-east of Osiek, 23 km (14 mi) east of Staszów, and 74 km (46 mi) south-east of the regional capital Kielce.
