= Grobla, Świętokrzyskie Voivodeship =

Grobla
- Village
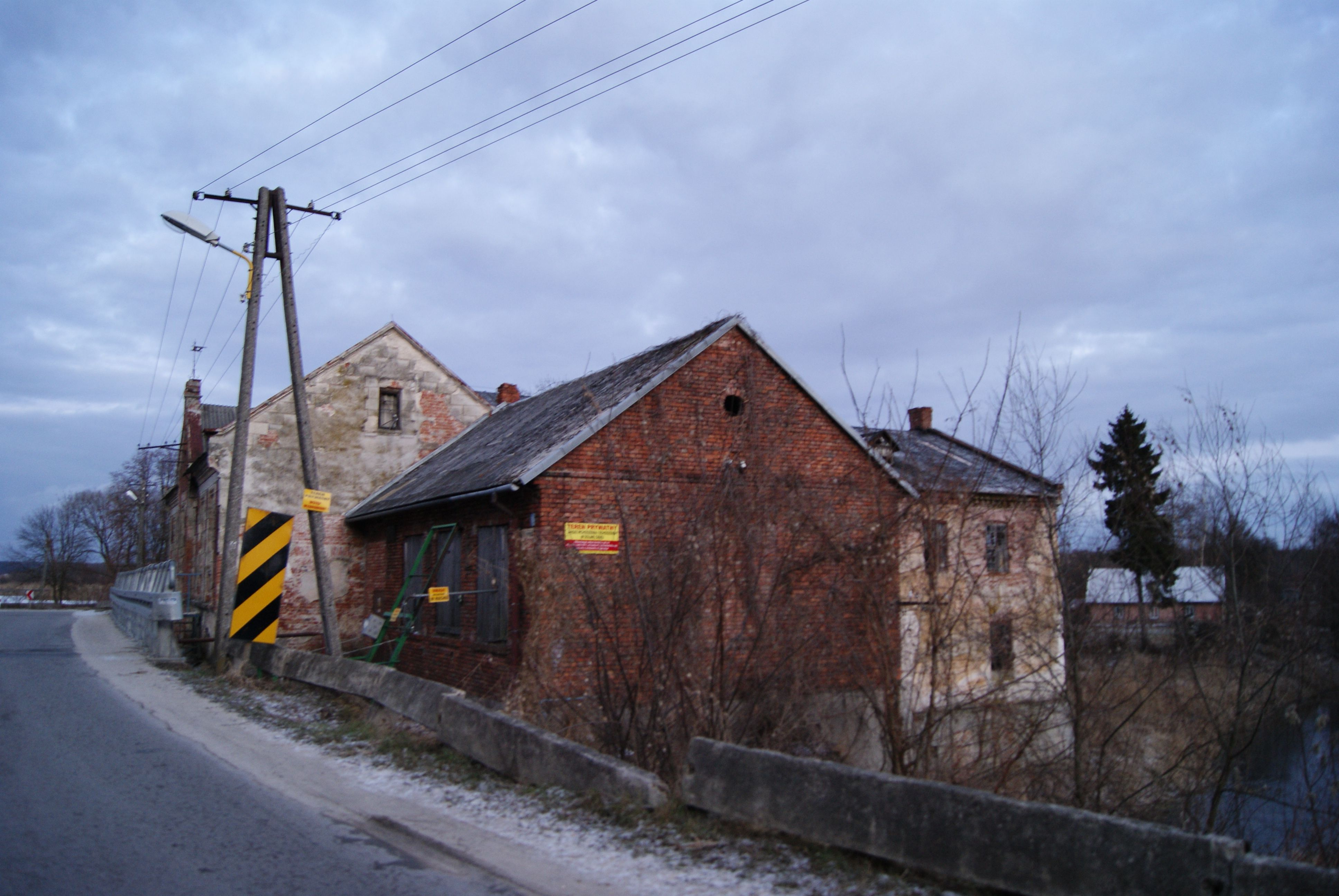

- Location within Poland
- Coordinates: 50°30′52″N 21°11′05″E
- Country: Poland
- Voivodeship: Świętokrzyskie
- County: Staszów
- Gmina: Rytwiany
- Sołectwo: Grobla
- Elevation: 177.1 m (581 ft)

Population (31 December 2009 at Census)
  - Total: ▲75
- Time zone: UTC+1 (CET)
  - Summer (DST): UTC+2 (CEST)
- Postal code: 28-236
- Area code: +48 15
- Car plates: TSZ

Grobla [ˈɡrɔbla] is a village in the administrative district of Gmina Rytwiany, within Staszów County, Świętokrzyskie Voivodeship, in south-central Poland. It lies approximately 3 km (2 mi) south-west of Rytwiany, 6 km (4 mi) south of Staszów, and 58 km (36 mi) south-east of the regional capital Kielce.
