= Krzysztof Mikołaj Radziwiłł =

Polish translator and politician

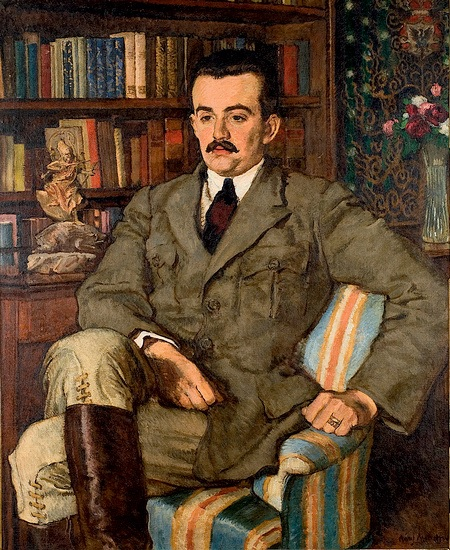
- Portrait of Radziwiłł by Józef Mehoffer
- Born: 29 July 1898; Zegrze, Łomża Governorate, Congress Poland
- Died: 24 March 1986 (aged 87); Warsaw, Polish People's Republic
- Children: 5, including Anna Radziwiłł

Prince Krzysztof Mikołaj Artur Radziwiłł (Polish pronunciation: [ˈkʂɨʂtɔf miˈkɔwaj ˈartur raˈd͡ʑiviww]; 29 July 1898 – 24 March 1986) was a Polish translator and politician, descendant of the well-known aristocratic Radziwiłł family. He was a supporter of the Communist regime in Poland, which gained him the nickname Czerwony książę (lit. 'Red Prince').

Krzysztof was owner of Staszów estates and member of the Sejm in the Polish People's Republic.

His daughter Anna Radziwiłł broke with his politics, becoming a noted dissident and influential member of Solidarity.
