= Tursko Wielkie =

- Village
- Location within Poland
- Coordinates: 50°27′59″N 21°23′17″E
- Country: Poland
- Voivodeship: Świętokrzyskie
- County: Staszów
- Gmina: Osiek
- Sołectwo: Tursko Wielkie
- Parts of village: Villageships' List: Nowe Tursko; Tursko Wielkie-Karczmisko; Tursko Wielkie-Kolonia; Tursko Wielkie-Koziarówka; Tursko Wielkie-Zagumnie
- Elevation: 156.3 m (513 ft)

Population (31 December 2009 at Census)
  - Total: ▲352
- Time zone: UTC+1 (CET)
  - Summer (DST): UTC+2 (CEST)
- Postal code: 28-221
- Area code: +48 15
- Car plates: TSZ

Tursko Wielkie [ˈturskɔ ˈvjɛlkʲɛ] is a village in the administrative district of Gmina Osiek, within Staszów County, Świętokrzyskie Voivodeship, in south-central Poland. It lies approximately 9 km (6 mi) south-west of Osiek, 19 km (12 mi) south-east of Staszów, and 72 km (45 mi) south-east of the regional capital Kielce.

The village has a population of ▲352.

The village is the location of the Battle of Tursko during the Mongol invasion.
