= Gmina Rytwiany =

Gmina Rytwiany Rytwiany Commune
- Gmina
- Coat of arms

- Coordinates (Rytwiany): 50°30′21.66″N 21°14′20.84″E
- Country: Poland
- Voivodeship: Świętokrzyskie
- County: Staszów
- Seat: Rytwiany

Area (through the years 2007–2010)
  - Total: 124.66 km^{2} (48.13 sq mi)

Population (31 December 2010 at Census)
  - Total: 6,240
  - Density: 50.1/km^{2} (130/sq mi)
- Time zone: UTC+1 (CET)
  - Summer (DST): UTC+2 (CEST)
- Postal code: 28-236
- Area code: +48 15
- Car plates: TSZ
- Website: http://www.rytwiany.com.pl

Gmina Rytwiany is a rural gmina (administrative district) in Staszów County, Świętokrzyskie Voivodeship, in south-central Poland. Its seat is the village of Rytwiany, which lies approximately 5 kilometres (3 mi) south-east of Staszów and 58 km (36 mi) south-east of the regional capital Kielce.

The gmina covers an area of 124.66 square kilometres (48.1 sq mi), and as of 2010 its total population is ▼6,240.

== Demography ==
According to the 2011 Poland census, there were 6,240 people residing in Rytwiany Commune, of whom 49.2% were male and 50.8% were female. In the commune, the population was spread out, with 20.7% under the age of 18, 38.4% from 18 to 44, 22.9% from 45 to 64, and 18% who were 65 years of age or older.

Table 1. Population level of commune in 2010 – by age group
SPECIFICATION					Measure unit	POPULATION (by age group in 2010)																		
SPECIFICATION					Measure unit	TOTAL	0–4	5–9	10–14	15–19	20–24	25–29	30–34	35–39	40–44	45–49	50–54	55–59	60–64	65–69	70–74	75–79	80–84	85 +
I.	TOTAL				person	6,240	274	340	392	515	447	417	467	457	380	355	448	448	360	231	238	191	149	131
I.	—	of which in			%	100	4.4	5.4	6.3	8.3	7.2	6.7	7.5	7.3	6.1	5.7	7.2	7.2	5.8	3.7	3.8	3.1	2.4	2.1
I.	1.	BY SEX																						
I.	1.	A.	Males		person	3,067	141	157	206	256	244	220	244	228	199	192	234	212	176	100	102	73	52	31
I.	1.	A.	—	of which in	%	49.2	2.3	2.5	3.3	4.1	3.9	3.5	3.9	3.7	3.2	3.1	3.8	3.4	2.8	1.6	1.6	1.2	0.8	0.5
I.	1.	B.	Females		person	3,173	133	183	186	259	203	197	223	229	181	163	214	236	184	131	136	118	97	100
I.	1.	B.	—	of which in	%	50.8	2.1	2.9	3	4.2	3.3	3.2	3.6	3.7	2.9	2.6	3.4	3.8	2.9	2.1	2.2	1.9	1.6	1.6

Figure 1. Population pyramid of commune in 2010 – by age group and sex

Table 2. Population level of commune in 2010 – by sex
SPECIFICATION						Measure unit	POPULATION (by sex in 2010)		
SPECIFICATION						Measure unit	TOTAL	Males	Females
I.	TOTAL					person	6,240	3,067	3,173
I.	—	of which in				%	100	49.2	50.8
I.	1.	BY AGE GROUP							
I.	1.	A.	At pre-working age			person	1,292	649	643
I.	1.	A.	—	of which in		%	20.7	10.4	10.3
I.	1.	B.	At working age. grand total			person	3,824	2,060	1,764
I.	1.	B.	—	of which in		%	61.3	33	28.3
I.	1.	B.	a.	at mobile working age		person	2,397	1,246	1,151
I.	1.	B.	a.	—	of which in | %	38.4	20	18.4	
I.	1.	B.	b.	at non-mobile working age		person	1,427	814	613
I.	1.	B.	b.	—	of which in | %	22.9	13.1	9.8	
I.	1.	C.	At post-working age			person	1,124	358	766
I.	1.	C.	—	of which in		%	18	5.7	12.3

== Villages ==
Gmina Rytwiany contains the villages and settlements of Grobla, Kłoda, Niedziałki, Pacanówka, Podborek, Ruda, Rytwiany, Sichów Duży, Sichów Mały, Strzegom, Strzegomek, Święcica, Sydzyna, Szczeka and Tuklęcz.

== Neighbouring gminas ==
Gmina Rytwiany is bordered by the gminas of Łubnice, Oleśnica, Osiek, Połaniec, Staszów and Tuczępy.
