= Gromada =

Basic administrative division in Poland, similar to a village

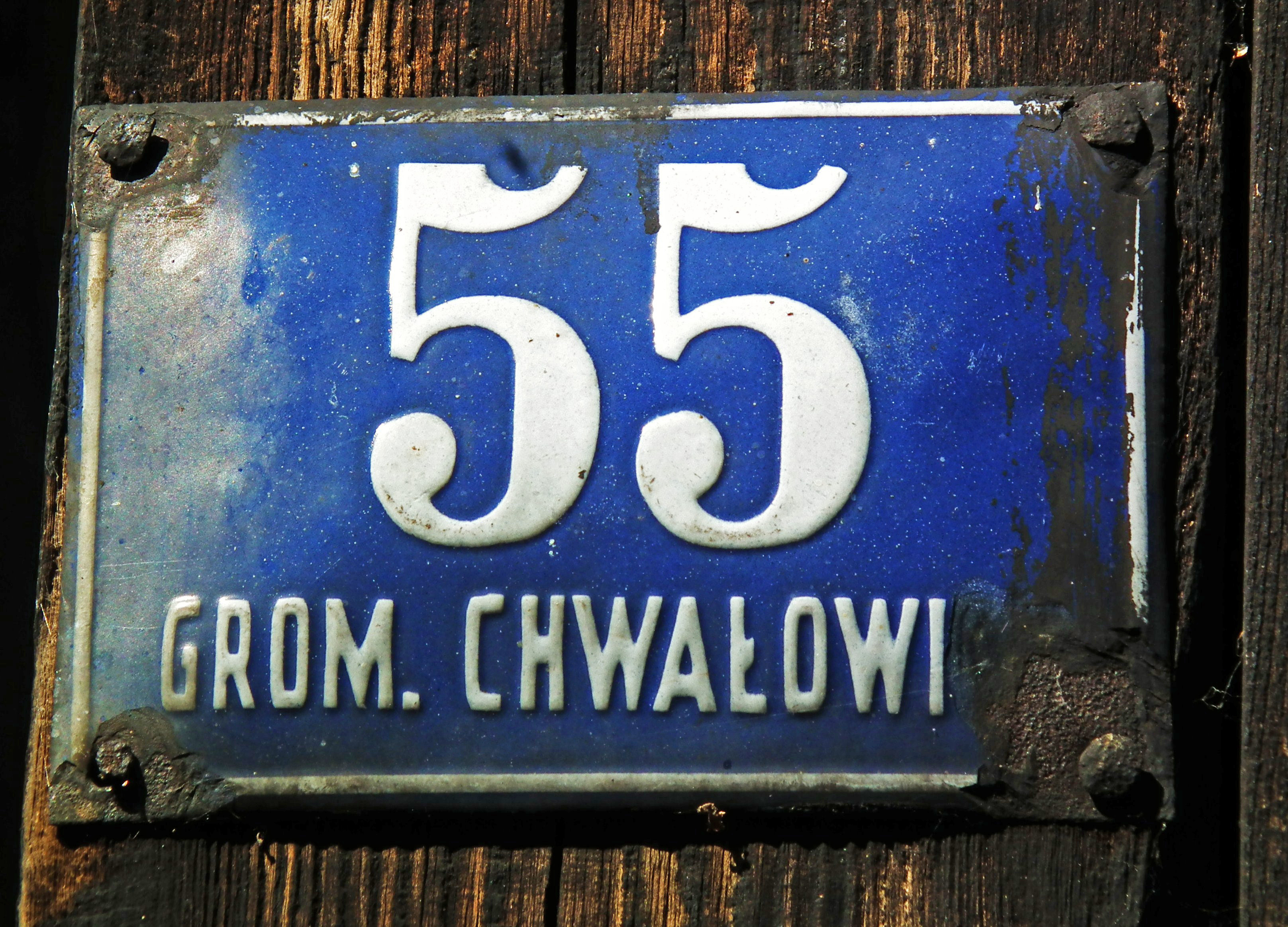
A house sign in Chwałowice indicating the site of the local gromada

Gromada [ɡrɔˈmada] is a Polish word meaning 'gathering', 'group', or 'assembly'. In the Polish–Lithuanian Commonwealth, the term referred to a village organization which embraced all the inhabitants of a village and acted as a local authority, as well as overseeing tax payments. In this sense, the gromada developed between the 16th and 18th centuries, and continued to function in Congress Poland. Their chiefs took the title of sołtys and were elected by the local population.

The gromada continued to function in interwar Poland, as a subdivision of a gmina.

In the Polish People's Republic, between 1954 and 1972, gromada constituted the lowest tier of local government, taking over the role previously played by gminas. A gromada would generally consist of several villages, but they were smaller units than the gminas had been. Examples include Gromada Osiek, Gromada Tursko Wielkie.

In 1973, gminas were reintroduced and gromada abolished. At present, the smallest unit of local government in rural Poland (subordinate to the gmina) is the sołectwo.
