= Tursko Małe =

- Village
- Location within Poland
- Coordinates: 50°26′50″N 21°20′41″E
- Country: Poland
- Voivodeship: Świętokrzyskie
- County: Staszów
- Gmina: Połaniec
- Sołectwo: Tursko Małe
- Elevation: 165.5 m (543 ft)

Population (31 December 2009 at Census)
  - Total: ▼202
- Time zone: UTC+1 (CET)
  - Summer (DST): UTC+2 (CEST)
- Postal code: 28-230
- Area code: +48 15
- Car plates: TSZ

Tursko Małe [ˈturskɔ ˈmawɛ] is a village in the administrative district of Gmina Połaniec, within Staszów County, Świętokrzyskie Voivodeship, in south-central Poland. It lies approximately 6 km (4 mi) east of Połaniec, 18 km (11 mi) south-east of Staszów, and 71 km (44 mi) south-east of the regional capital Kielce.

The village has a population of ▼202.
