= Ossala =

- Village
- Location within Poland
- Coordinates: 50°29′06″N 21°22′20″E
- Country: Poland
- Voivodeship: Świętokrzyskie
- County: Staszów
- Gmina: Osiek
- Sołectwo: Ossala
- Elevation: 180.1 m (591 ft)

Population (31 December 2009 at Census)
  - Total: ▲481
- Time zone: UTC+1 (CET)
  - Summer (DST): UTC+2 (CEST)
- Postal code: 28-221
- Area code: +48 15
- Vehicle registration: TSZ

Ossala [ɔsˈsala] (till December 31, 2001 as at Osala and then contemporary collaterant name of locality as at Ossala after the official law) is a village in the administrative district of Gmina Osiek, within Staszów County, Świętokrzyskie Voivodeship, in southern Poland. It lies approximately 7 km (4 mi) south-west of Osiek, 17 km (11 mi) south-east of Staszów, and 69 km (43 mi) south-east of the regional capital Kielce.

The village has a population of 481.

== History ==
In 1827 Ossala had a population of 401.

Following the joint German-Soviet invasion of Poland, which started World War II in September 1939, the village was occupied by Germany. In 1939, the Polish resistance organized a collection and shipping point for aid packages for Poles who had lost their homes and possessions in other regions, i.e. those arrested or expelled by the Germans and those fleeing Soviet-occupied eastern Poland.
