= Rytwiany =

- Village
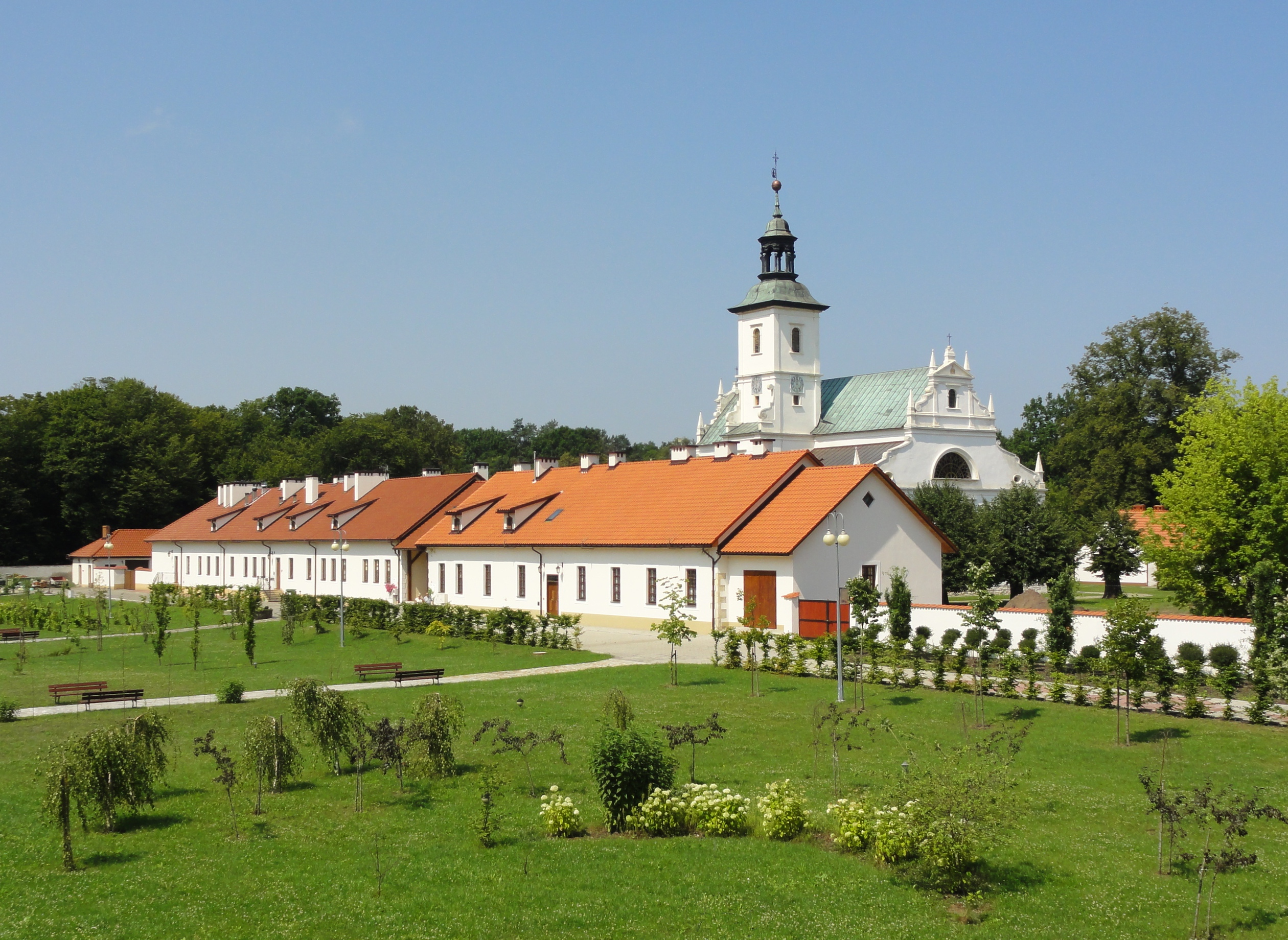
- Camaldolese monastery complex

- Coat of arms

- Location within Poland
- Coordinates: 50°31′45″N 21°12′21″E
- Country: Poland
- Voivodeship: Świętokrzyskie
- County: Staszów
- Gmina: Rytwiany
- Elevation: 178.7 m (586 ft)

Population (31 December 2009 at Census)
  - Total: ▲1,827
- Time zone: UTC+1 (CET)
  - Summer (DST): UTC+2 (CEST)
- Postal code: 28-236
- Area code: +48 15
- Vehicle registration: TSZ
- Website: http://www.rytwiany.com.pl/

Rytwiany [rɨtˈfjanɨ] is a village in Staszów County, Świętokrzyskie Voivodeship, in south-central Poland. It is the seat of the gmina (administrative district) called Gmina Rytwiany. It lies on the Czarna Staszowska river, approximately 5 km (3 mi) south-east of Staszów and 58 km (36 mi) south-east of the regional capital Kielce.

== History ==
Rytwiany, which belongs to the historic province of Lesser Poland, has a rich and long history. First documented owner of the village was a nobleman named Piotr Bogoria Skotnicki (13th century), and across the centuries, Rytwiany belonged to a number of owners, including Cardinal Wojciech Jastrzębiec, Hieronymus Jaroslaw Łaski, the Lubomirski family, the Potocki family, the Radziwiłł family, and several others.

In 1425–1436, Bishop Jastrzębiec built a defensive Gothic castle in Rytwiany, surrounded by the swamps of the Czarna river. The castle, partly destroyed in 1657 (see Deluge) was inhabited until the 19th century, then fell into a ruin, to be finally demolished in 1859. All that now remains of it is a fortified tower. In the early 17th century, when the village and the castle belonged to the Tęczyński family, it was a cultural center of the region. In 1621, upon request of Jan Tęczyński, Camaldolese monks settled here, building an abbey and a church. The monks moved to Warsaw in 1819, and their church now serves as a local parish church. In the late 19th century, the Radziwiłł family, who were the last owners of the village, built here a palace, which was remodelled in 2005 and now is a hotel.

During the German occupation of Poland (World War II), the Polish resistance movement was active in the village, and Polish underground press was distributed in Rytwiany.
