= Osiek, Świętokrzyskie Voivodeship =

Osiek
- Town
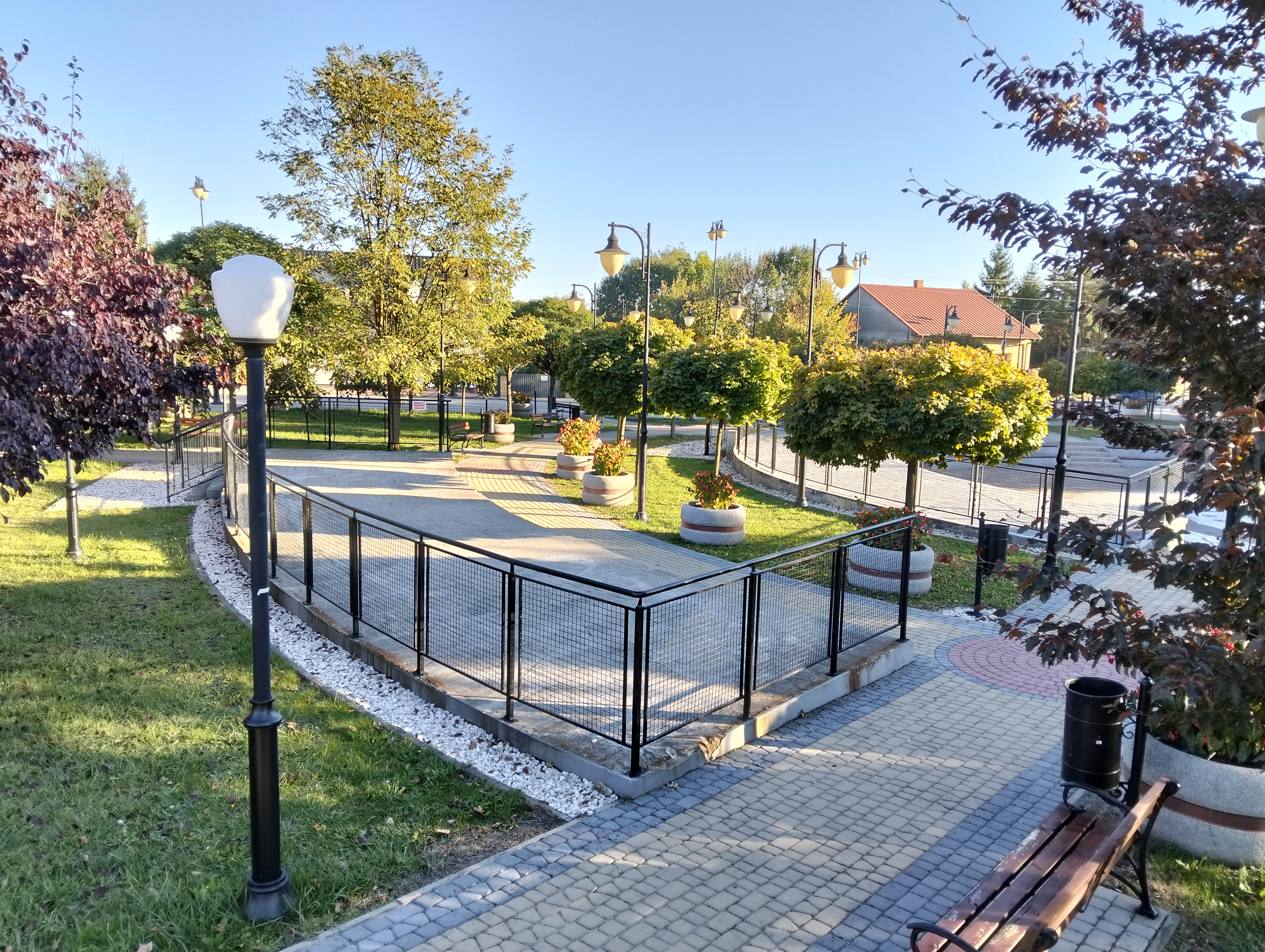
- Market Square in Osiek

- Coat of arms

- Location within Poland
- Coordinates: 50°31′12″N 21°26′34″E
- Country: Poland
- Voivodeship: Świętokrzyskie
- County: Staszów
- Gmina: Osiek
- Town rights: 1430

Area (through the years 2008-2010)
  - Total: 17.43 km^{2} (6.73 sq mi)
- Elevation: 180 m (590 ft)

Population (31 December 2010 at Census)
  - Total: 2,001
  - Density: 114.8/km^{2} (297.3/sq mi)
- Time zone: UTC+1 (CET)
  - Summer (DST): UTC+2 (CEST)
- Postal code: 28-221
- Area code: +48 15
- Vehicle registration: TSZ

Osiek [ˈɔɕɛk] is a town in Staszów County, Świętokrzyskie Voivodeship, Poland, with 2,001 inhabitants (2010). The town lies in Lesser Poland, along the National Road nr. 79, which goes from Warsaw to Bytom. Osiek is located 15 kilometers northeast of Połaniec, and 18 kilometers west of Tarnobrzeg, 180 meters above sea level.

Its main point of interest is St. Stanisław parish church, built in the late 17th century. Osiek has a rail station called Osiek Staszowski, on a secondary importance line which joins Tarnobrzeg with Włoszczowice.

== History ==
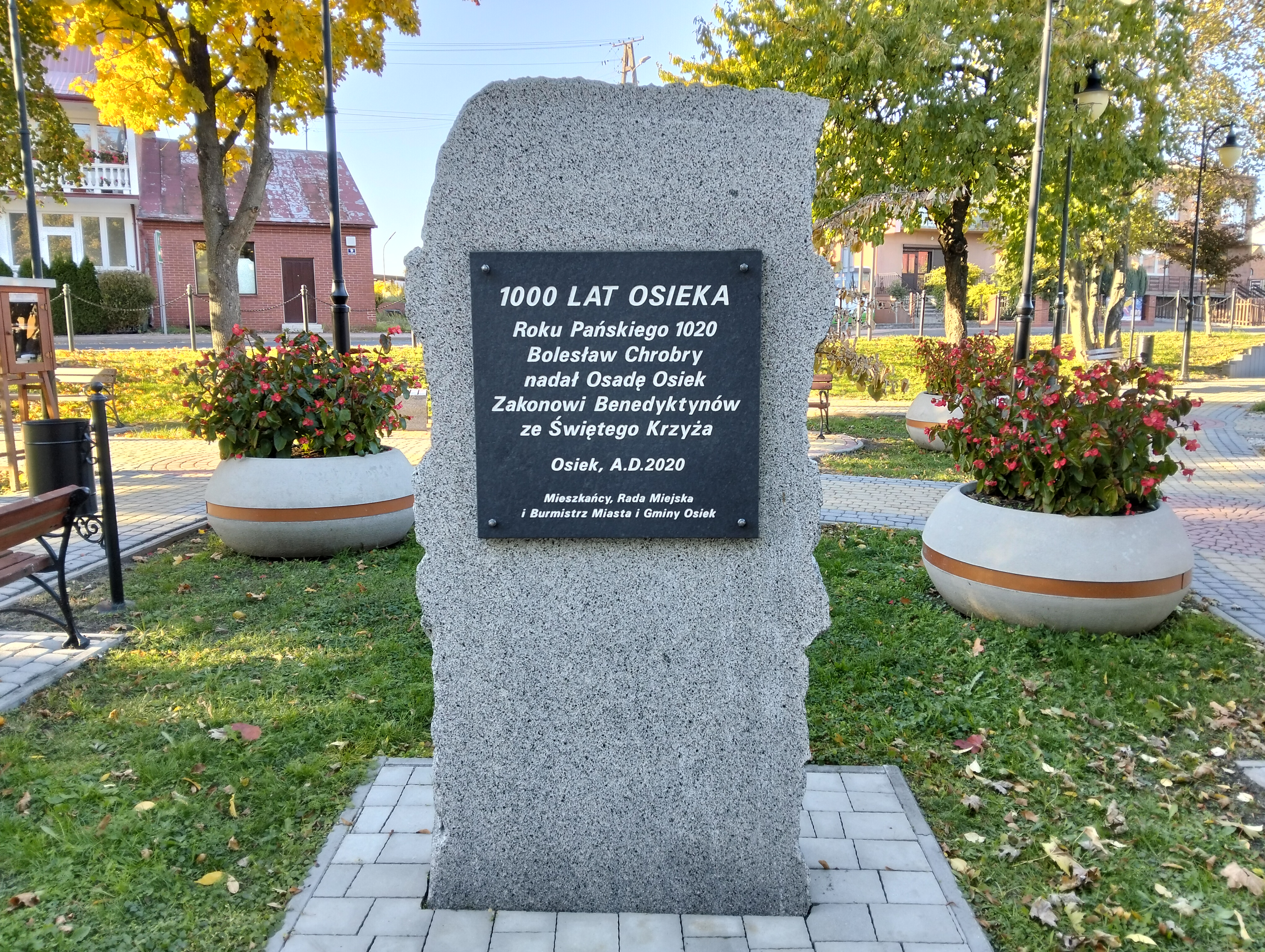
Monument to the town's millennium

Osiek is one of the oldest towns in the region. According to legends, in 1020 King Bolesław Chrobry presented the village called Ossziek to the Benedictine Monastery at Święty Krzyż. In 1253 the name of the village was spelled Ossek. It belonged to Princes of Sandomierz, and had its own marketplace. In 1270, Osiek was the property of Prince Bolesław V the Chaste. Its residents took advantage of a favorable location, along a merchant route from Kraków, through Sandomierz and Lublin, to the Grand Duchy of Lithuania. Many Piast dynasty princes would stop here during their trips across the country. Osiek most likely was a fortified gord, and in the mid-14th century, King Casimir III the Great built (or strengthened) a local castle.

Osiek was burned in the Second Mongol invasion of Poland, but the village was quickly rebuilt. In 1430, King Władysław II Jagiełło granted it the Magdeburg rights, allowing the town to organize weekly markets on Wednesdays. Osiek was a royal town of the Kingdom of Poland, administratively located in the Chęciny County in the Sandomierz Voivodeship in the Lesser Poland Province. It prospered during the Polish Golden Age. In the second half of the 16th century, its population amounted to 1,000, with a number of guilds, such as bakers, butchers, blacksmiths, tailors, potmakers, and millers. Osiek had 100 houses, and a wooden parish church of St. Stanisław. The decline of the town was brought by the Swedish invasion of Poland (1655–1660). Like almost all Lesser Poland's towns, Osiek was ransacked and burned, and never recovered from the destruction.

Following the Third Partition of Poland, in 1795, it was annexed by Austria. After the Polish victory in the Austro-Polish War of 1809, it was regained by Poles and included within the short-lived Duchy of Warsaw. After its dissolution, since 1815, it was part of the Russian-controlled Congress Poland. The town further declined in the 19th century, losing its charter in 1869, after January Uprising.

During the Invasion of Poland (September 1939), retreating units of the Polish Army fought here a battle with the Wehrmacht, in which app. 100 Poles died. As a result of World War I and World War II destruction, there are no other historic buildings in Osiek, except for the parish church.

On 1 July 1994 Osiek regained its town rights.

== Former parts of town – physiographic objects ==
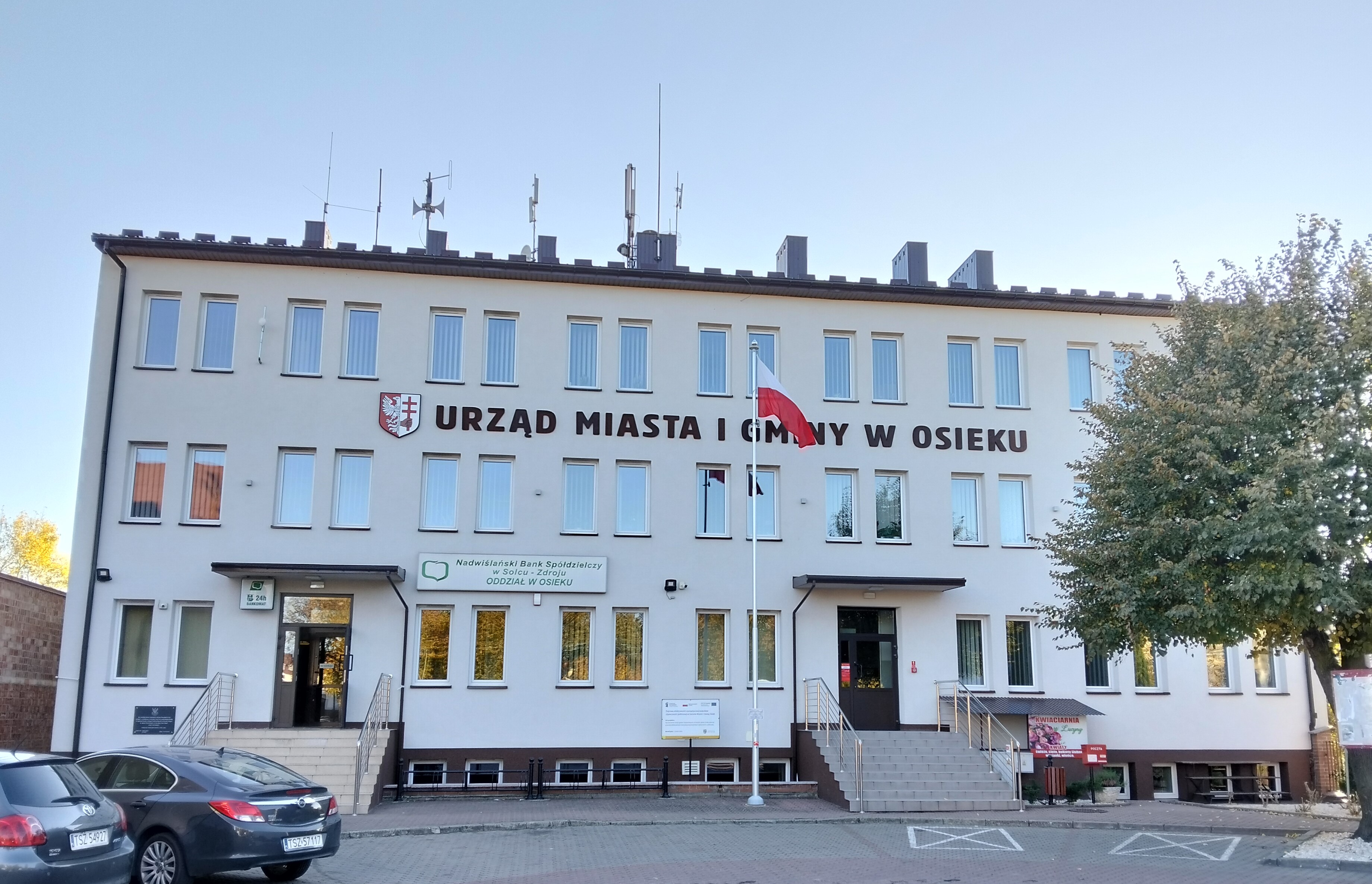
Municipal office

In the years 1970 of last age, sorted and prepared out list part of names of localities for Osiek, at as type of settlement then yet is a village, what you can see in table 3. Remaining not exchanged parts here are described in integral part of town Osiek now, in Osieczko.

Table 3. Index of official names of localities and physiographic objects
Names of village – town	Names of part of village – town	Names of physiographic objects – nature of objects
I. Gromada OSIEK
1. Osiek	1. Dwór; 2. Gaj Osiecki; 3. Grabowiec; 4. Parysówka	1. Broźnia – forest 2. Buchnia – field 3. Chudyniówka (Chudzyniówka) – field 4. Dołki – field 5. Gaj Osiecki – field 6. Grabowiec – field, forest 7. Kacapówka – field, forest 8. Kozłówka – meadow 9. Ługi – field 10. Nakielec – field 11. Niwa – field 12. Parysówka – field 13. Pasierbowskie – field 14. Pastwisko – meadow 15. Pod Cmentarzem – field 16. Pod Kierkutem – field 17. Pod Wolą – field 18. Podgórki – field 19. Posusze – field 20. Rzeka – brook 21. Skotnia – field 22. Stawiska – meadow 23. Zagrądzie – field 24. Zagroble – meadow, field 25. Zagumnie – field
