= Łężczok nature reserve =

Water nature reserve in the Silesian Voivodeship

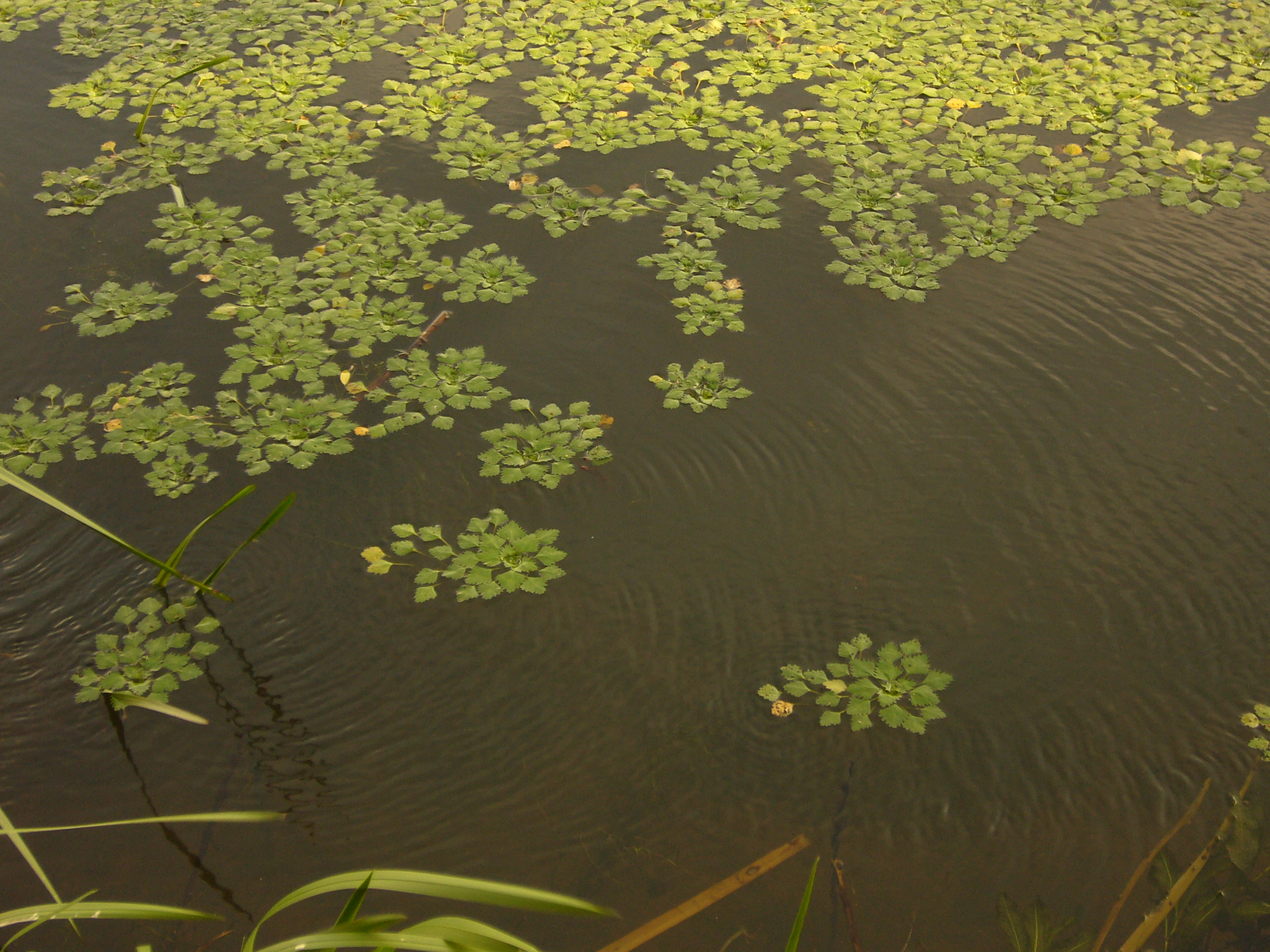
- Water caltrop habitat at Łężczok in Babiczak Pond
- Interactive map of Łężczok nature reserve
- Location: Racibórz, Poland
- Area: 477.38 ha (1,179.6 acres)
- Established: January 23, 1957

Łężczok nature reserve (known as Łężczak until 2015) is a water nature reserve located in the Silesian Voivodeship, Racibórz County, situated between Racibórz, Nędza, Zawada Książęca, and Babice. It is part of the Rudy Landscape Park. The reserve is home to a rich variety of fauna and flora, including over half of the bird species found in Poland. Two hiking trails and one cycling route pass through the reserve. It has held the status of a nature reserve since 23 January 1957.

Initially, the reserve covered an area of 396.21 hectares; however, it has been expanded several times, most recently in 2015, to its current size of 477.38 hectares.

The reserve is located within the jurisdiction of the Rudy Raciborskie Forest District. It is overseen by the Regional Nature Conservation Officer in Katowice. While the reserve does not have a formal protection plan, conservation tasks are in place that ensure the area is subject to active protection.

== Geography ==
The Łężczok nature reserve is located in the Racibórz Basin, in the southwestern part of the Silesian Voivodeship, Racibórz County. Its area extends from Racibórz, specifically the district of Markowice, through Nędza and Babice, to Zawada Książęca. The reserve's eastern boundary is marked by Kędzierzyn-Koźle–Chałupki railway.

It is one of the largest nature reserves in the Silesian Voivodeship, currently covering 477.38 hectares. Before its expansion in 2015, it occupied 408.9 hectares, of which 245 hectares were ponds, 144 hectares forests, 7 hectares meadows, and the remainder consisted of roads and dikes. The reserve borders grasslands and arable fields and forms part of the Rudy Landscape Park.

Within the reserve are eight ponds: Ligotniak, Brzeziniak, Babiczak, Grabowiec, Tatusiak, Markowiak, Salm Duży, and Salm Mały. These ponds have existed since the 13th century and are used for extensive fish farming.

Ponds of the Łężczok Reserve before the 2015 expansion. Ponds: 1 – Brzeziniak, 2 – Babiczak Południowy, 3 – Babiczak Północny, 4 – Salm Duży, 5 – Salm Mały, 6 – Tatusiak, 7 – Grabowiec

== Origin of the name ==
The name of the reserve comes from the Old Polish language, derived from the words łęg and łęgi, which referred to wetland areas covered by forests or meadows on marshes. Consequently, the nearby village, located to the northwest of the reserve, is also named Łęg, and the stream flowing through the reserve is called Łęgoń.

== History of the area and its protection ==
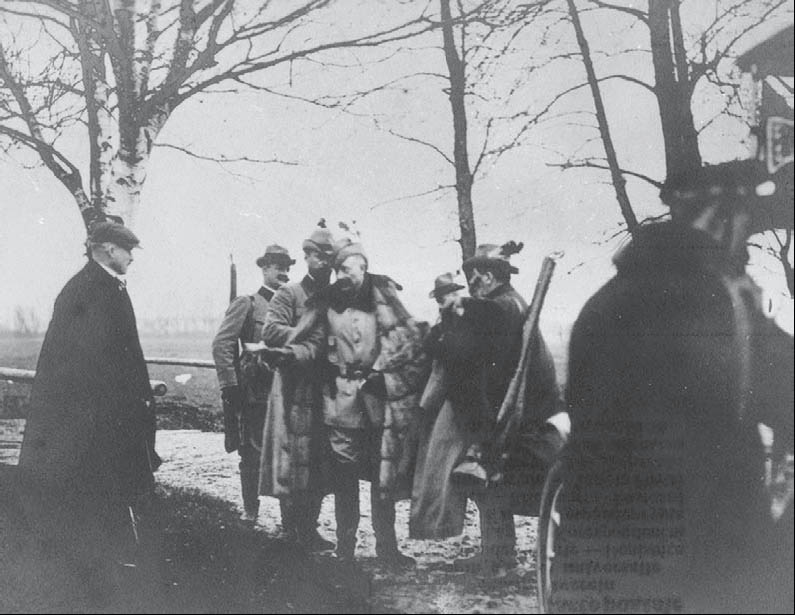
In 1906, Wilhelm II, the German Emperor, participated in a hunt near Łężczok

The oldest historical references to this area date back to the 13th century, indicating that local inhabitants practiced fish farming there. The sources reveal that, in addition to fish farming by noble estates, some ponds were also used by peasant farms for this purpose. In the 14th century, these lands came under the ownership of the Cistercians from Rudy. The Cistercians utilized the oxbow lakes of the Oder river to create an artificial system of reservoirs by constructing sluices and embankments. Besides creating new reservoirs, they regulated the existing ones.

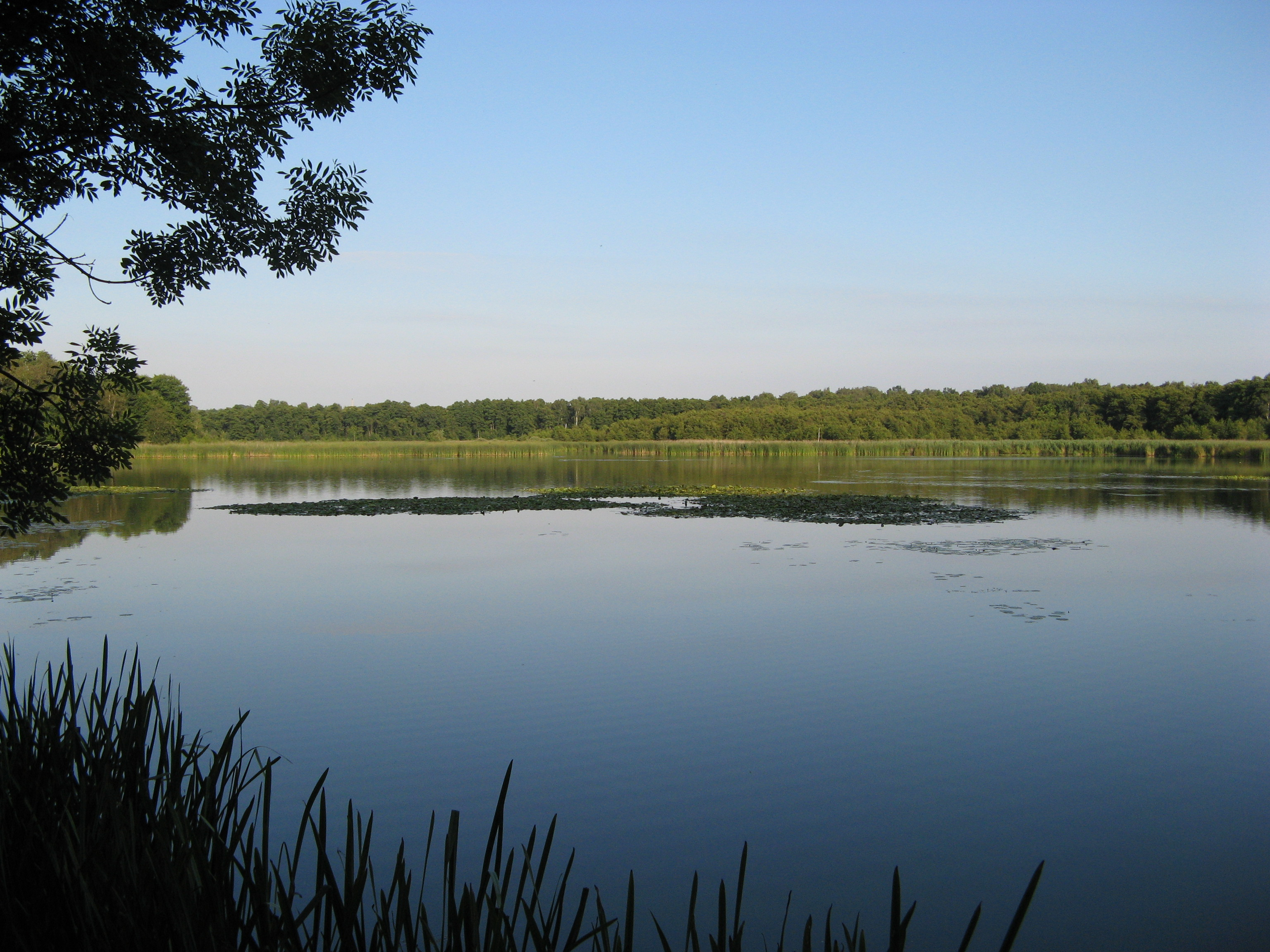
Panorama of Brzeziniak, the smallest pond in the reserve

In 1683, King John III Sobieski passed along the road between the ponds on his way to the Battle of Vienna and possibly planted several oak trees there. To commemorate this event, the Polish Hussars Trail, marked in red, was established through Łężczok. In 1783, the Cistercians built a hunting lodge along the road traversing the forest. In 1810, following the dissolution of the Cistercian Order, their estate came under the ownership of Landgrave Victor Amadeus of Hesse-Rotenburg and subsequently passed to the Prussian princes Hohenlohe-Waldenburg-Schillingsfürst, particularly to Viktor I, nephew of Victor Amadeus’ wife. The new owners altered the ponds and forests by introducing monoculture spruce plantations and established pheasant breeding for hunting purposes. During the Hohenlohe family's ownership, the area was studied by researchers such as the German physician and naturalist Julius Roger and the naturalist Emil Fiek. In 1906 and 1910, German Emperor Wilhelm II, accompanied by Duke Victor III of Racibórz, participated in hunts in the area.

In 1922, the area's significant natural values led to its inclusion in the registry of natural monuments. In 1945, under the Polish Committee of National Liberation decree, the area became state property. On 23 January 1957, by order of the Minister of Forestry and the Wood Industry, the area was designated as the Łężczak nature reserve. In 1993, the reserve became part of the Rudy Landscape Park. In 2009, due to poor conditions, particularly of the embankments, the reserve was temporarily closed, and the ponds were drained. With EU funding amounting to 5 million PLN, the area underwent modernization, including embankment repairs and the construction of artificial islands on the ponds. The reserve was reopened in December 2012. Since 16 October 2015, following an ordinance by the Regional Director of Environmental Protection in Katowice, the reserve has been officially named Łężczok.

== Flora ==
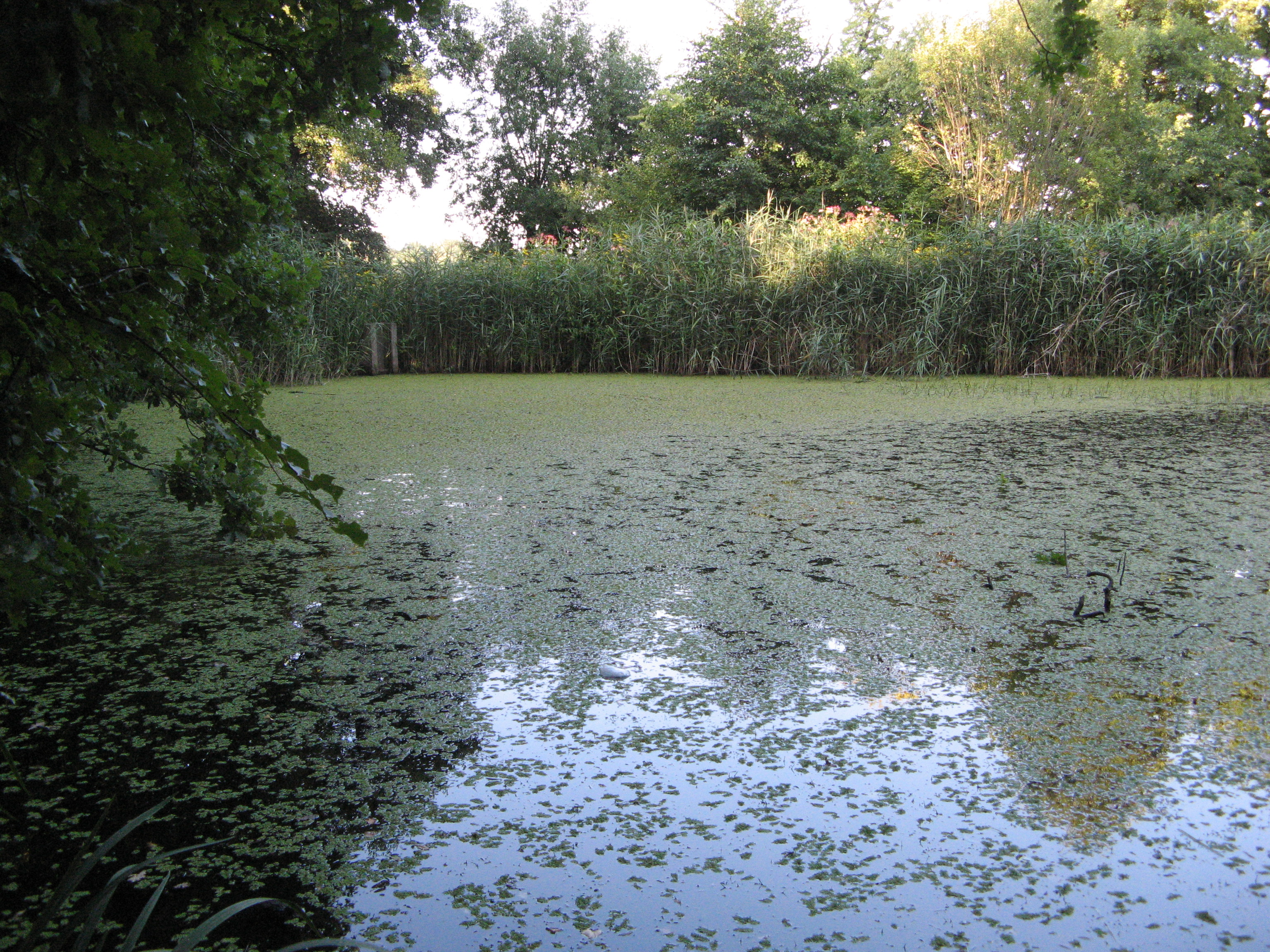
Natural habitat of floating fern on one of the ponds in the Łężczok nature reserve

The forested areas of the reserve are dominated by old-growth stands with a two-story structure, giving it a specific character reminiscent of the interior of a primeval forest. 64% of the forests in the reserve consist of stands over 100 years old. Among them, noteworthy are specimens of pedunculate oaks of considerable size, estimated to be between 330 and 400 years old.

Also notable are the embankments planted with various tree species, forming linden, oak, hornbeam, and field alleys. In the reserve, the largest trees are beeches, lindens, and oaks. The trees growing on the embankments shape the macroclimate of the reserve, as they serve as windbreaks. The gaps in the alleys are filled with shrubs, and the entire arrangement creates an ecological niche for many species of plants, fungi, and animals. Its location near the Moravian Gate, geographical and climatic factors, and past economic activities have made these tree-lined embankments one of the unique features of the reserve.

The diversity of habitats in the reserve is reflected in the richness of plant communities and species. The vegetation is represented by more than 40 plant communities, including five forest communities. The first is the subcontinental oak-hornbeam forest, located in the western part of the reserve. This community includes trees such as oaks, hornbeams, small-leaved lindens, larches, eastern white pines, and birches. This part of the forest also features lush groundcover. The next forest community is the elm riparian forest, where trees such as ashes, pedunculate oaks, maples, and occasionally elms and hornbeams can be found. This is one of the best-preserved forest communities in the reserve and the entire Oder valley. The alder-ash riparian forest is another community in the reserve, dominated by common alders, occasionally accompanied by ashes, pedunculate oaks, and spruces. This community is found near the eastern boundary of the reserve. Another community is the currant alder carr, dominated by common alders. This carr is located to the northeast of the Salm Mały and Salm Duży ponds. The final community is the acidophilic oak forest, where species such as pedunculate oaks and silver birches are present, with Scots pines appearing occasionally. This community has the poorest and most acidic soils in the reserve.

Among the numerous non-forest communities are aquatic vegetation (e.g., the water caltrop and water lily communities), shoreline vegetation (e.g., Typhetum latifoliae, Typhetum angustifoliae, Caricion elatae, and Phragmitetum australis), and meadow communities (e.g. Molinion caeruleae).

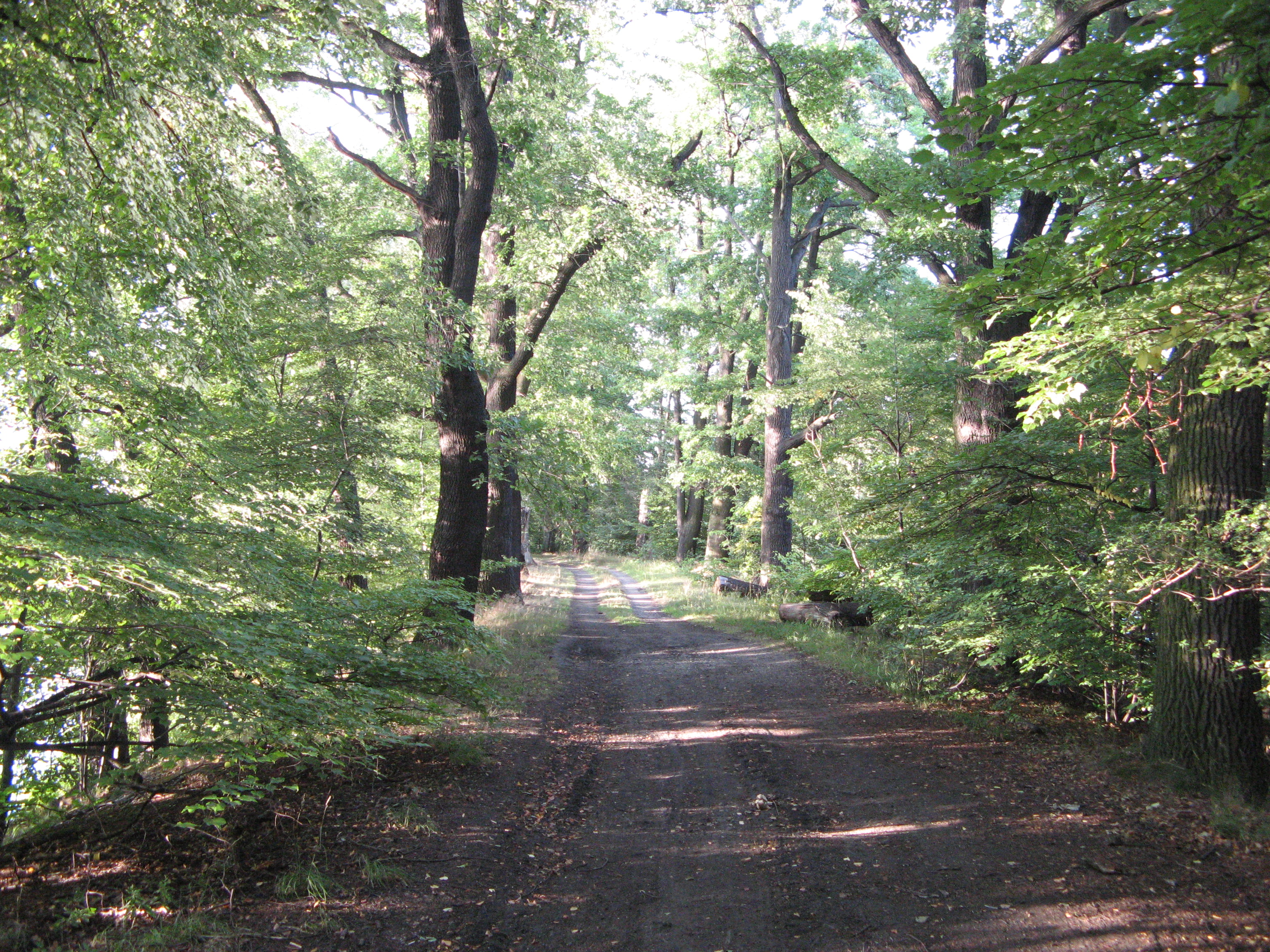
Tree-lined alleys of monumental trees on the embankment separating the ponds

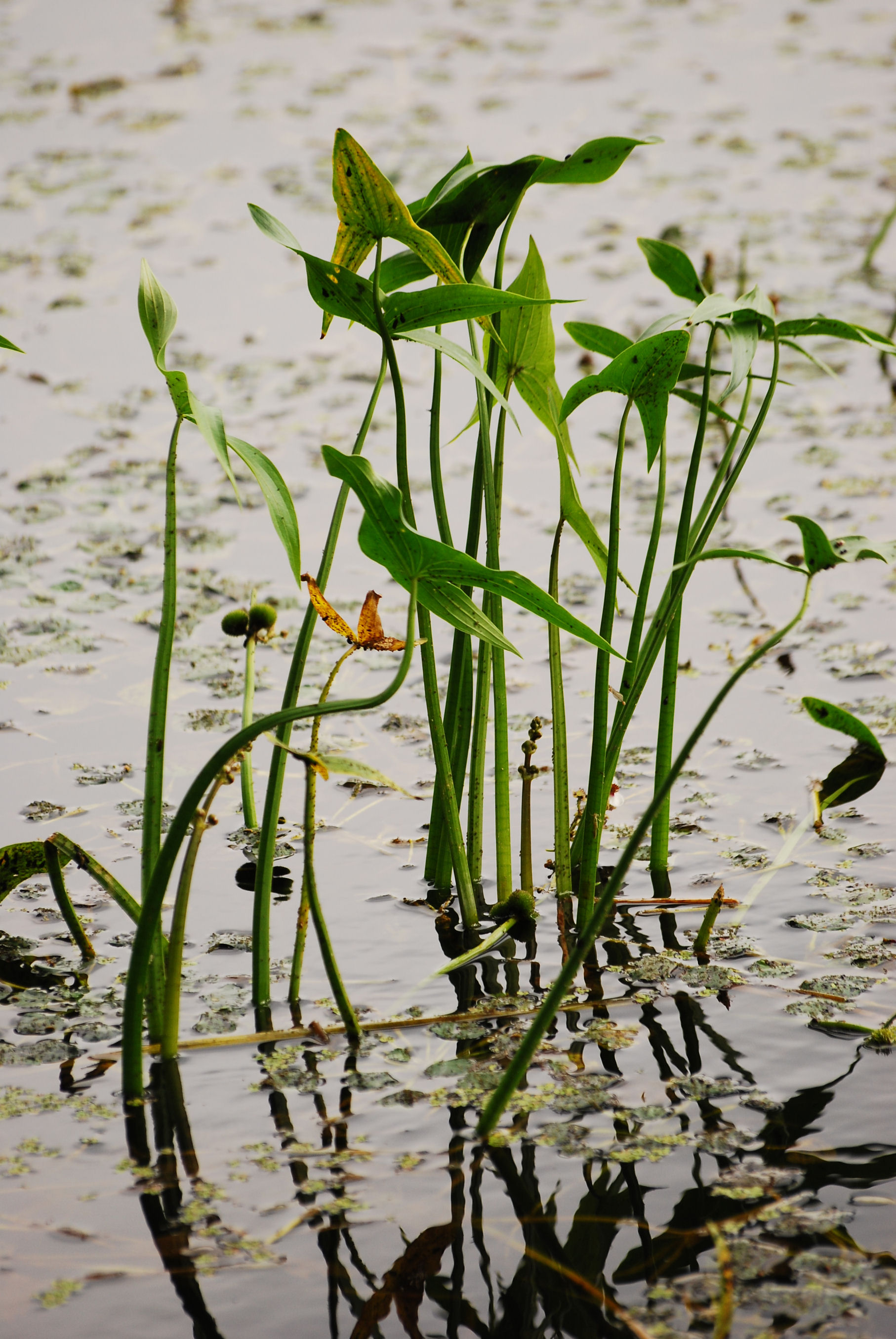
Arrowhead

In the western part of the reserve, spring brings blossoms of snowdrops, alpine squills, wood anemones, spring vetchlings, early dog-violets, yellow archangels, wild garlic, Corydalis cava, fumeworts, sweet woodruffs, and bugles. In the eastern part, shrubs such as common heather, European blueberry, and lesser periwinkle can be found. Herbs are also present in these areas. Near the edges of the ponds, where the ground is slightly waterlogged, as well as in marshy areas, species such as common skullcap, purple loosestrife, mugwort, black-bindweed, yellow flag, greater spearwort, and Carex grow. Peatlands can be observed in the reserve, forming in areas where ponds have become significantly shallower.

The ponds are overgrown with plants that have submerged rhizomes and roots, including common reed, bulrush, sweet flag, simplestem bur-reed, American waterweed, and arrowhead. Another group consists of plants rooted to the bottoms of water bodies with leaves and flowers floating on the water’s surface, such as longroot smartweed, white waterlily, yellow water-lily, bladderwort, and the tertiary relict water caltrop. Additionally, freely floating plants such as floating fern, European frog-bit, and duckweed can be observed. The last group includes underwater plants, such as hornwort, soft hornwort, Eurasian watermilfoil, and American waterweed.

The meadows in Łężczok host species such as broad-leaved marsh orchid, autumn crocus, cock's-foot, hornworts, soft-grass, clover, bird’s-foot trefoil, Vicia, chrysanthemum, lady’s mantle, bistort, and true forget-me-not.

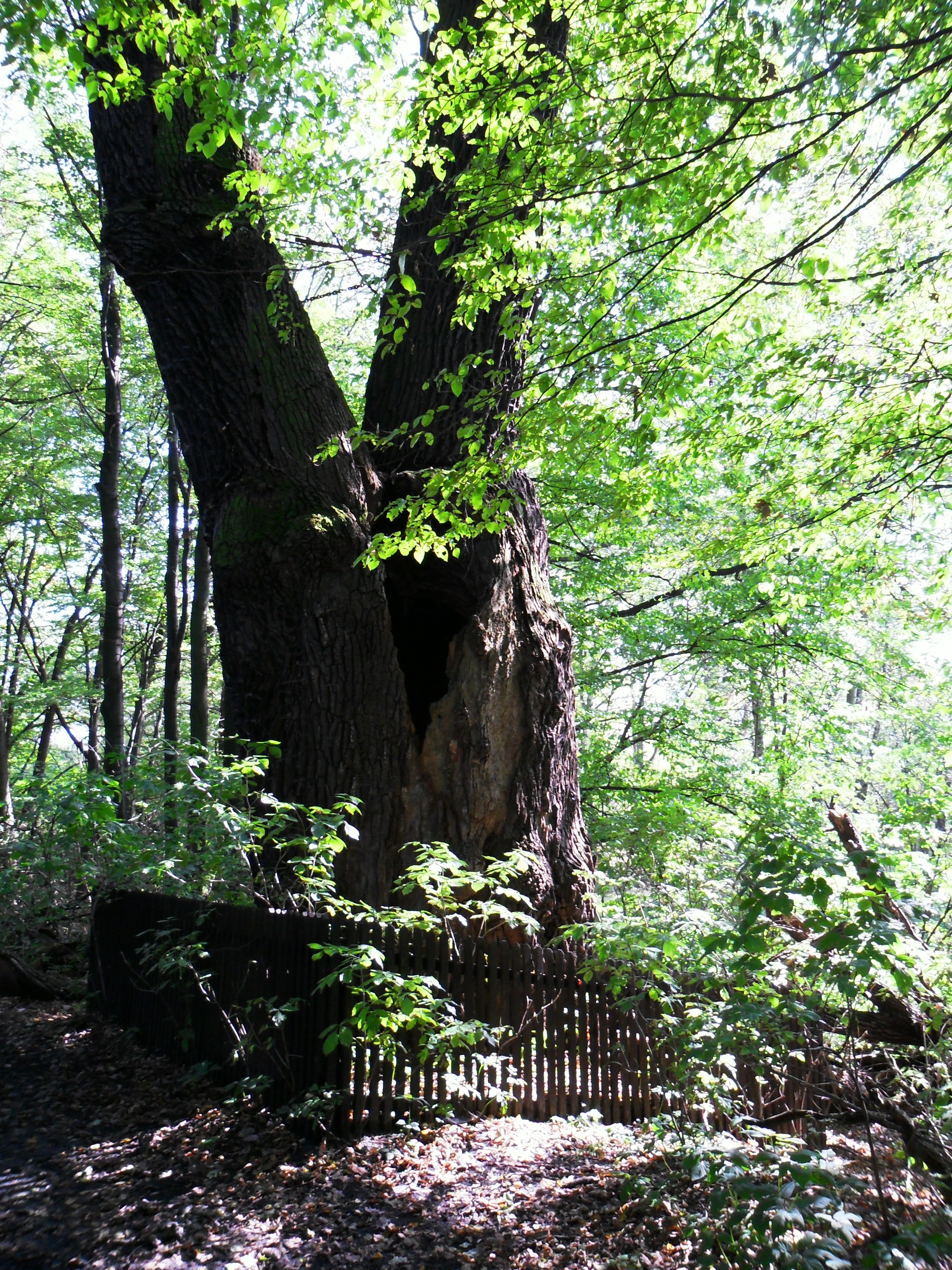
Sobieski Oak

The flora of the reserve comprises 530 species of vascular plants, 22 of which are protected. These include white waterlily, yellow water-lily, floating fern, and the water caltrop, which is nationally endangered. In the forest groundcover, notable species include snowdrop and alpine squill. Among protected plants, there is a rare orchid species Epipactis albensis. Protected fungi in the reserve include parasitic bolete, giant polypore, hen-of-the-woods, and common stinkhorn. Other protected plants include mezereon, common ivy, and dark-red helleborine.

A natural monument in the reserve, known as Sobieski Oak, is a pedunculate oak with a DBH of 690 cm. The insectivorous waterwheel plant was once present in the reserve, and round-leaved sundew can still be found in the peatlands.

== Fauna ==
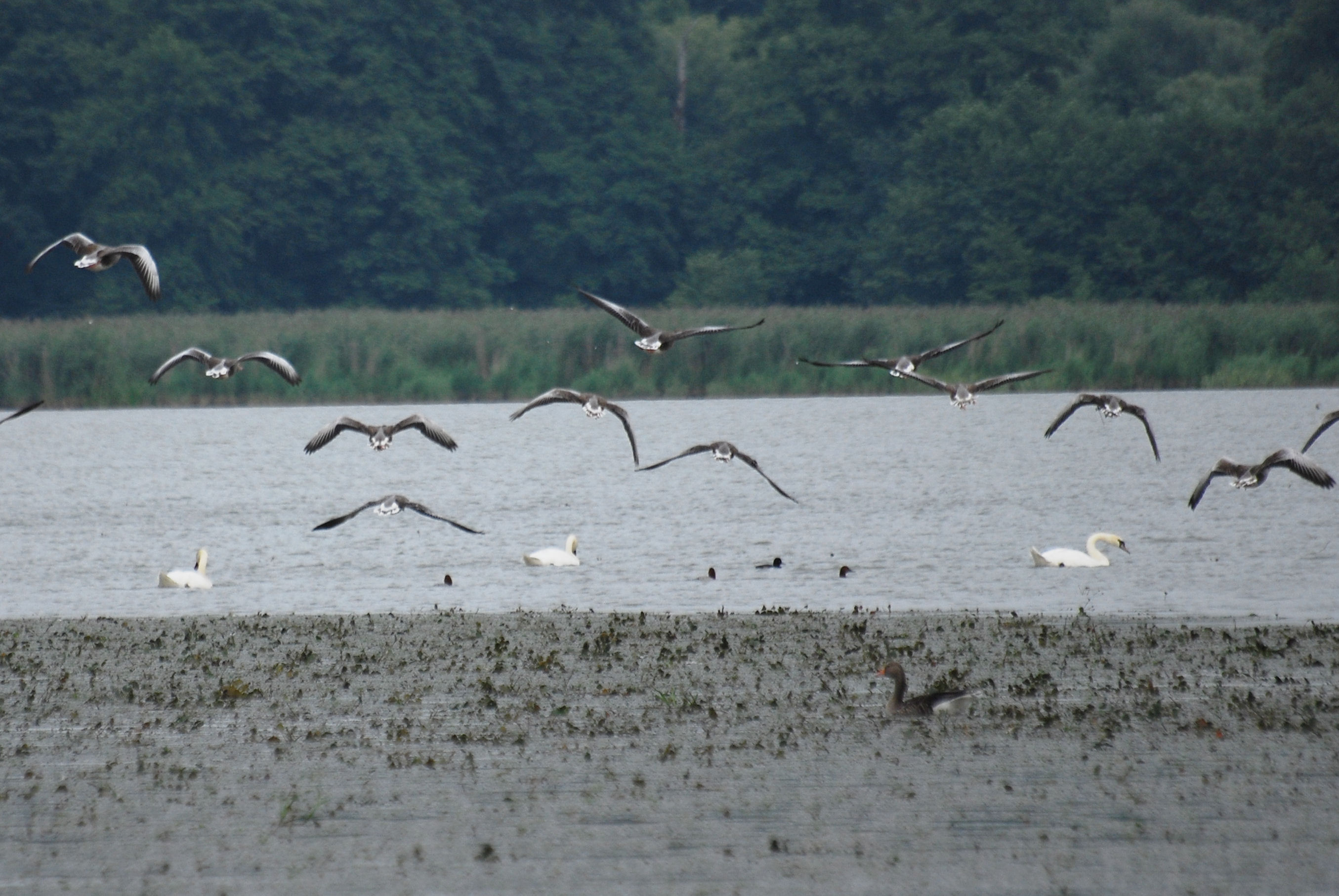
Birds in the Łężczok nature reserve

The reserve is home to 51% of bird species found in Poland, which amounts to over 190 species, including 115 nesting species. The remaining species use the area for foraging and resting during migrations. Łężczok is an excellent site for wildlife observation, particularly for ornithologists. In terms of bird species diversity, the reserve ranks second in Poland after the Stawy Milickie nature reserve. Due to the numerous ponds, many water and marsh birds inhabit the area.

During the breeding season, species such as grebes (great crested and black-necked grebes), Eurasian bitterns, cormorants, greylag geese, and various Anatidae (gadwalls, garganeys, northern shovelers, common pochards, tufted ducks, and red-crested pochards) can be found there. The red-crested pochard regularly resides in the reserve, making it one of only three such locations in Poland. Rare species like the ferruginous duck, river warbler, collared flycatcher, purple heron, squacco heron, Eurasian spoonbill, barnacle goose, red-breasted goose, pied avocet, whiskered tern, and black-winged kite (unique in Poland) have also been observed.

Apart from water and marsh birds, the reserve is home to other bird species, including woodpeckers and birds of prey such as the common buzzard, Eurasian goshawk, common kestrel, Eurasian sparrowhawk, western marsh harrier, European honey buzzard, and black kite. Outside the breeding season, species such as the white-tailed eagle, lesser spotted eagle, osprey, black stork, grey heron, mute swan, and black-headed gull can be spotted.

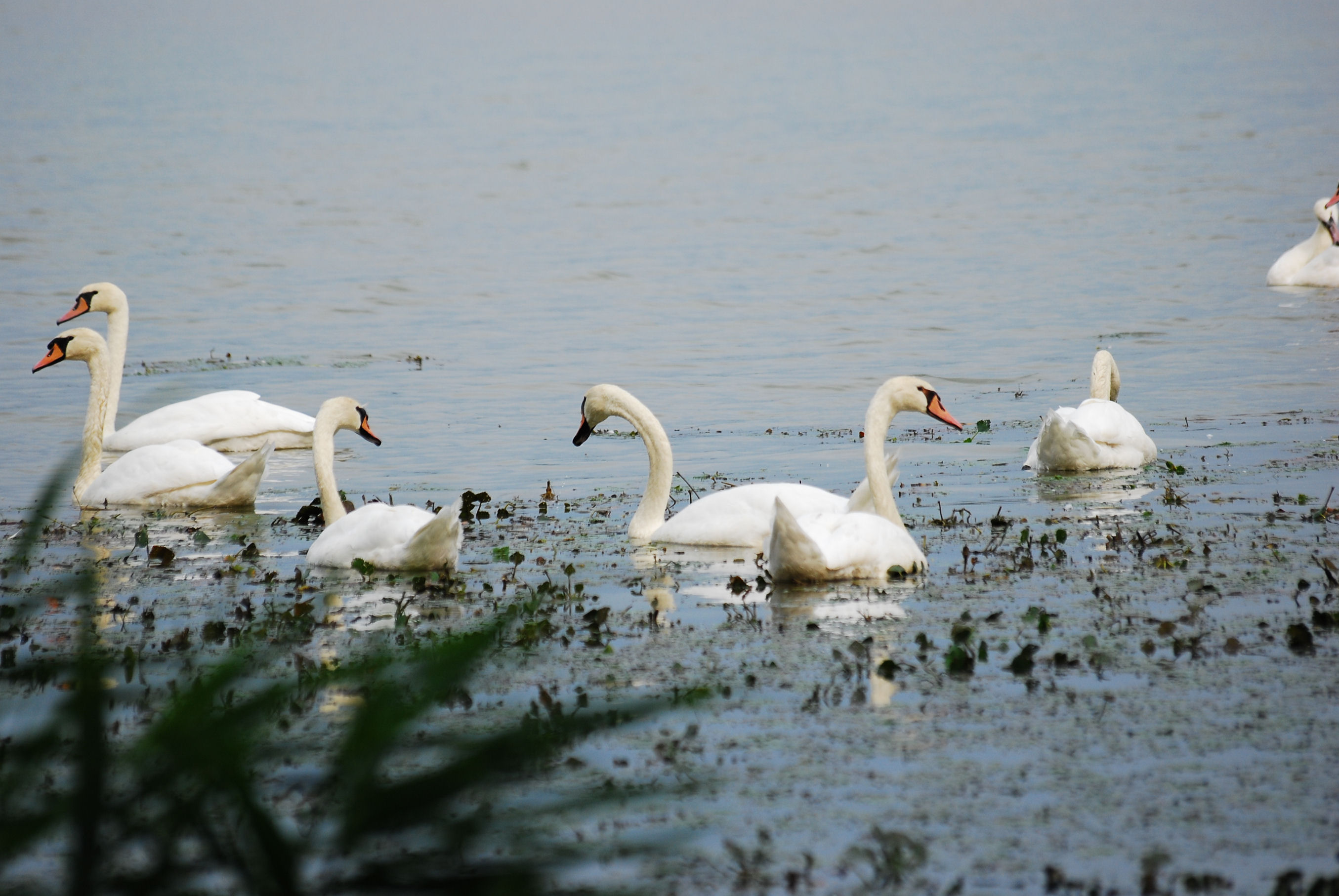
Mute swan

In addition to its abundant birdlife, the reserve is inhabited by numerous amphibians and reptiles. Among the amphibians are the European fire-bellied toad, common spadefoot, newts, common and European green toads, and the European tree frog. Reptiles include the sand lizard, viviparous lizard, adder, and grass snake.

The reserve also hosts many insect species, particularly Odonata, bumblebees, and Lepidoptera.

The last group of animals in the reserve includes mammals, represented by 23 species. Noteworthy species include the hedgehog, common shrew, bats, muskrat, and predators such as the fox, beech marten, European polecat, weasel, and Eurasian badger.

Protected animals in the reserve include the Roman snail, caterpillar hunters, European tree frog, true toad, common spadefoot, European fire-bellied toad, newts, sand lizard, black-headed gull, grebes, waterfowl, great cormorant, storks, Eurasian bittern, little bittern, lesser spotted eagle, common buzzard, owl, Eurasian golden oriole, Eurasian treecreeper, Old World flycatcher, common blackbird, shrew, Talpids, Erinaceidae, bats, beech marten, and weasel. Among the 22 species of bats found in Poland, 10 occur in Łężczok. These include the greater mouse-eared bat, Natterer's bat, whiskered bat, Brandt's bat, common pipistrelle, brown long-eared bat, and lesser noctule. The lesser noctule is listed in Poland’s Red Book of Endangered Species.

== Tourism ==
=== Hunting lodge ===
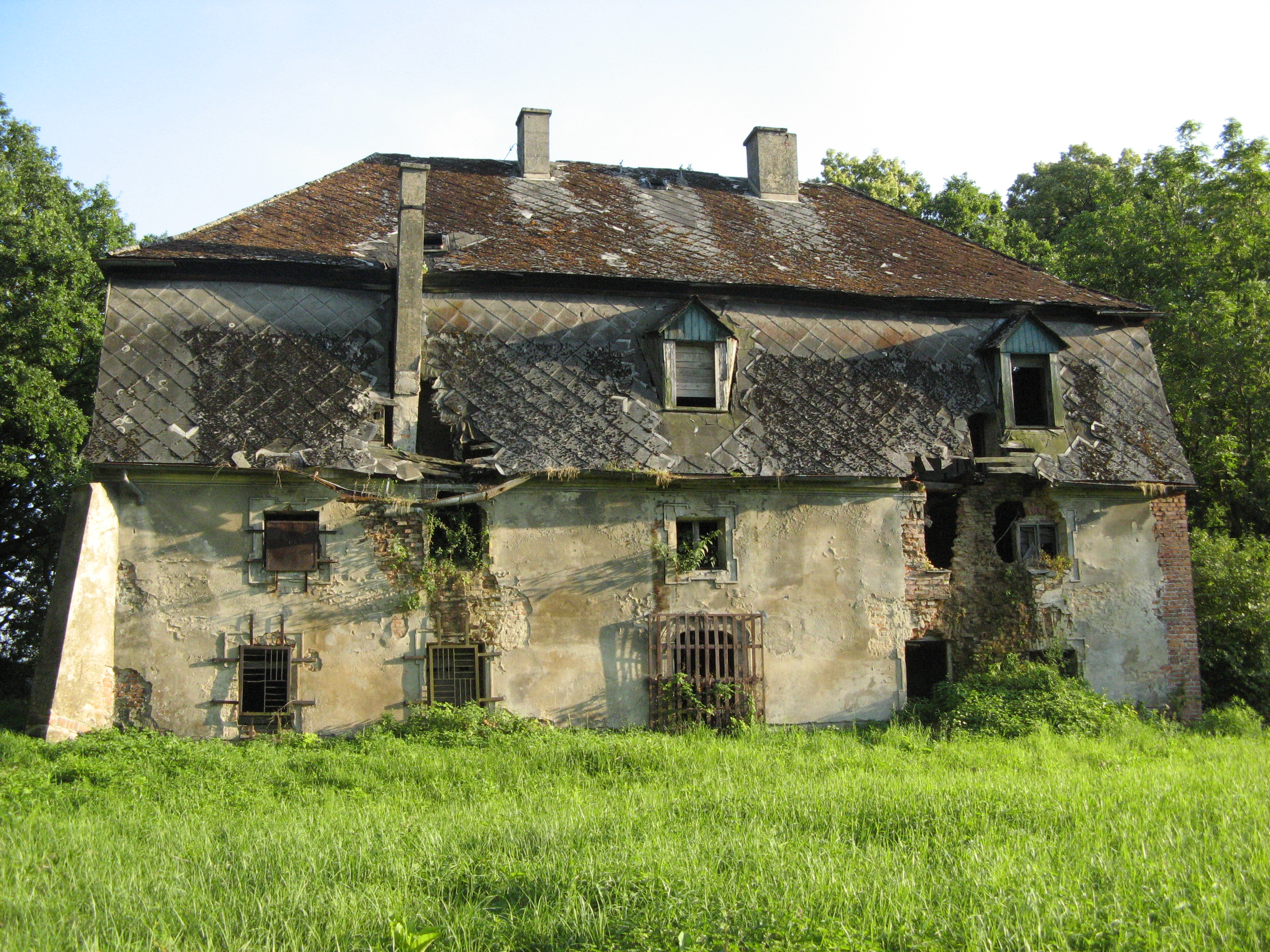
Historic post-Cistercian hunting lodge within the reserve

In the southern part of the reserve, between the Grabowiec and Brzeziniak ponds, there is a historic hunting lodge. Built in 1783 by the Cistercian order, which owned these lands, the lodge transitioned to the Racibórz princes in 1810 following the dissolution of the monastery. The princes used it as a resting place after hunts. After World War II, the building served as a wilderness hut, but it is currently in ruins.

=== Tourist trails ===
Two tourist trails and one cycling route run through the reserve area:

- Yellow tourist trail – Trail of Polish Minority Schools Route: Chałupki → Tworków → Racibórz → Markowice → Łężczok → Łęg → Kuźnia Raciborska → Bierawa
- Red tourist trail – Polish Hussars Trail Route: Będzin → Bytom → Tarnowskie Góry → Gliwice → Rudy → Łężczok → Racibórz → Pietrowice Wielkie → Krzanowice
- Green cycling route – Route 344-Z Route: Markowice → Łężczok → Nędza → Ciechowice → ferry crossing → Łubowice → Czerwięcice → Błażejowice → Łany → Polska Cerekiew

=== Educational trails ===
There are six educational trails within the reserve. The first trail focuses on the aquatic ecosystem of the Brzeziniok and Grabowiec ponds, where one can observe white waterlilies and yellow water-lilies. Another trail is the avenue of monumental trees, where visitors can see monumental oaks and beeches along with specimens of tree fungi. The third trail highlights the meadow ecosystem, allowing the observation of the autumn crocus as well as semi-natural meadow communities. The next educational trail explores the forest ecosystem (riparian and oak-hornbeam forest fragments of the reserve), emphasizing natural forest phytocenoses and early spring forest floor vegetation, including geophytes such as the snowdrop, alpine squill, and wild garlic. The fifth trail focuses on the aquatic ecosystem of the Salm Duży and Babiczok Północny ponds, drawing attention to aquatic vegetation, such as the water caltrop, and breeding and migratory waterfowl. This area serves as a feeding ground for the black stork and the white-tailed eagle. The final educational trail examines the aquatic ecosystem of the Babiczok Południowy pond, featuring floating fern and islands hosting breeding colonies of black-headed gulls, common terns, and black-necked grebes.

== People associated with Łężczok ==
The German Romantic poet Joseph von Eichendorff was linked to Łężczok. He spent his youth in the family castle in Łubowice and visited Łężczok during numerous hunting trips. He mentioned this in his memoirs:

Then there was a grand duck and snipe hunt at the Brzezina pond, which ended with wine drinking on the dam. Hurrah, hooray, salvos. They threw a wine barrel into the air, and everyone shot at it while it was flying.

In 1906 and 1910, the German Emperor Wilhelm II participated in hunting trips in this area. The second one went down in history due to a scandal. To please the Emperor, Duke Victor III of Ratibor bought hundreds of game birds, which he released in the forest. In five hours, the emperor shot 738 pheasants, 3 western capercaillies, and one hare and jay, making an average of 2.5 accurate shots per minute and using over a thousand rounds of ammunition. The capercaillies had been specially brought to Łężczok for the hunt, along with the golden pheasant, which had been introduced by Baron von Reibnitz. However, no one managed to hunt it. The real scandal broke out when a report from the hunt was published in the magazine Hunting in Words and Pictures, revealing that the pheasants were kept in baskets and only released once the emperor had taken his shooting position. Despite an investigation by Vivtor III, no one was ever found to have disclosed this information.

== Legends ==
There are local legends connected to the areas within the reserve. The first one is associated with a small bridge, called the Devil's Bridge, because local people had seen a water spirit (utopiec) on it. This mischievous creature hid in the ponds and the Łęgoń stream. Local farmers often heard cries for help near the ponds. Anyone who saw a black dog with large green eyes by the pond was doomed, as it would pull them into the water. Before the first haymaking each year, young girls would go to Łężczok to appease the water spirit. When their singing and laughter pleased the creature, the water levels in the ponds and rivers remained low, allowing the farmers to safely begin their work. Otherwise, the waters would rise, breaking the sluices and dikes, flooding the fields, and destroying everything. The water spirit enjoyed playing pranks on drunk farmhands returning from tavern parties through Łężczok. The prank involved showing them a will-o'-the-wisp in the dark forest, leading them in the wrong direction, or sometimes transforming into a log under their feet, causing them to fall. The creature was often seen as a giant marten blocking the passage between the ponds.

Another legend is associated with a sundew plant that grew in the Łężczok swamp, near the village of Nędza. When two boys passed near this place, a woman in a long black dress appeared to them. The stranger asked the boys for help in freeing her and her subjects. In exchange for their help, she promised them great riches. The boys agreed to assist the woman. She told them that she had drowned along with her city in the swamp, and that the next day, at the same time, she would bring them the key to the gates of that city. The only condition was that the boys must not be afraid. The next day, the woman appeared in the arms of the devil, surrounded by wolves, cats, and snakes. The two boys slowly approached her, and the lost city began to emerge. But when they got very close, they were overcome by fear and ran away as fast as they could. The city, along with the woman, vanished once more.

== Bibliography ==
- Wawoczny, Grzegorz; Bindacz, Anna (2005). Z biegiem Suminy. Atrakcje turystyczno-krajoznawcze gminy Nędza [Along the Sumin River: Tourist and Sightseeing Attractions of Gmina Nędza] (PDF) (in Polish). Racibórz: WAW. ISBN 83-89802-12-0.
