= Sobieski Oak =

Tree in Poland

- Dąb Sobieskiego
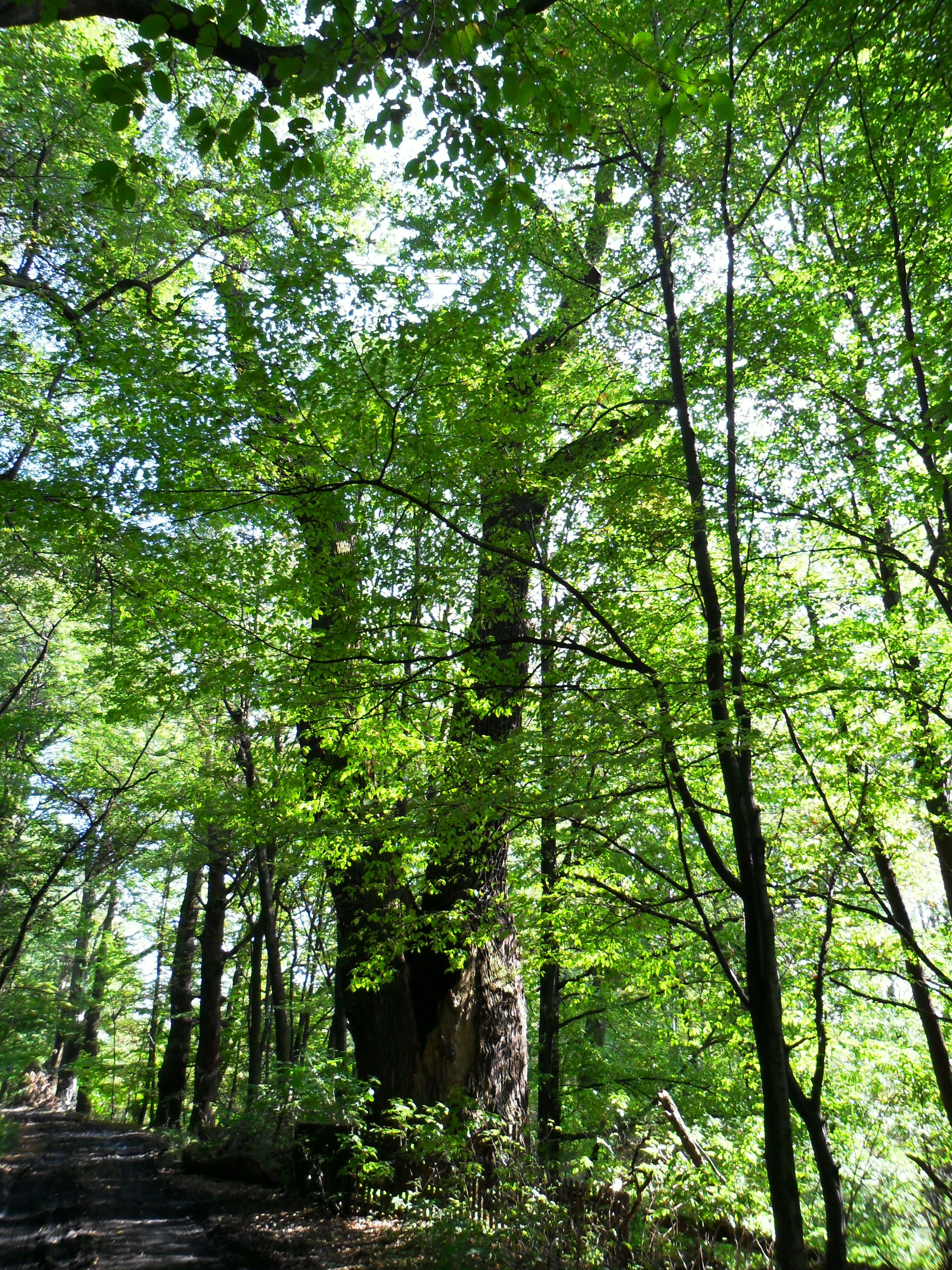
- Sobieski Oak
- Interactive map of Sobieski Oak
- Location: Racibórz, Poland
- Coordinates: 50°7′46″N 18°16′26″E
- Type: natural monument, pedunculate oak
- Height: 33 m (108 ft)
- Inauguration date: 14 April 1967
- Dedicated to: John III Sobieski

The Sobieski Oak (Polish: Dąb Sobieskiego) is an over 400-year-old specimen of pedunculate oak (Quercus robur) located within the Łężczok nature reserve, within the administrative boundaries of Racibórz. It is the thickest and oldest tree in Racibórz, the Łężczok reserve, and one of the three oldest and most magnificent trees in the Rudy Landscape Park. By the decision of the Presidium of the Provincial National Council in Opole dated 14 April 1967, it was designated a natural monument. It is surrounded by a small, wooden fence.

== Description ==
At a height of 3.5 meters, the thick base of the tree bifurcates into two main trunks. There used to be a third trunk, which most likely was broken by the wind. Today, a sizable crack remains in the tree where this trunk once was. The circumference of the tree measured at ground level slightly exceeds 850 cm, while the circumference of the oak at a height of 1.3 m is 690 cm, and its height is 33 m. The impressive size and venerable age (over 400 years) make this oak the thickest and oldest tree in Racibórz, within the Łężczok nature reserve, and one of the three oldest and most magnificent trees in the Rudy Landscape Park.

== Location ==
The oak tree grows in the Łężczok nature reserve, along the avenue running along the embankment separating the Grabowiec and Brzeziniak ponds, named the Polish Hussars Alley. This alley is unique in terms of natural features, with the Sobieski Oak standing out prominently. It is traversed by the Polish Hussars Trail, a red tourist trail connecting the localities through which the army led by John III Sobieski passed in 1683 during the Battle of Vienna. It also serves as the border between Racibórz and the Gmina Nędza – the oak is located on its southern side, within the administrative boundaries of Racibórz. Nearby the oak, there is also a historic hunting lodge from the 18th century and a wooden cross commemorating a forest guard killed by a poacher.

== Name and legends ==
The oak's name comes from a legend according to which the tree was planted to commemorate King John III Sobieski's stay in those areas during his march to the Battle of Vienna in 1683. This tradition was reinforced in the interwar period by Andrzej Czudek in his publications, considering it quite probable. However, it is known that this contradicts the truth because in 1683 the tree was already about 100 years old. It was most likely planted by the Cistercians, who used trees, mainly oaks, to line communication routes and embankments of fishponds. On the other hand, Jan Duda, in his publication Natural Features of Racibórz from 2001, writes about a legend according to which King John III Sobieski allegedly stopped under the oak while traveling to Vienna. The oak fits into the well-known tradition of Sobieski trees in Upper Silesia.

== Legal protection and conservation efforts ==
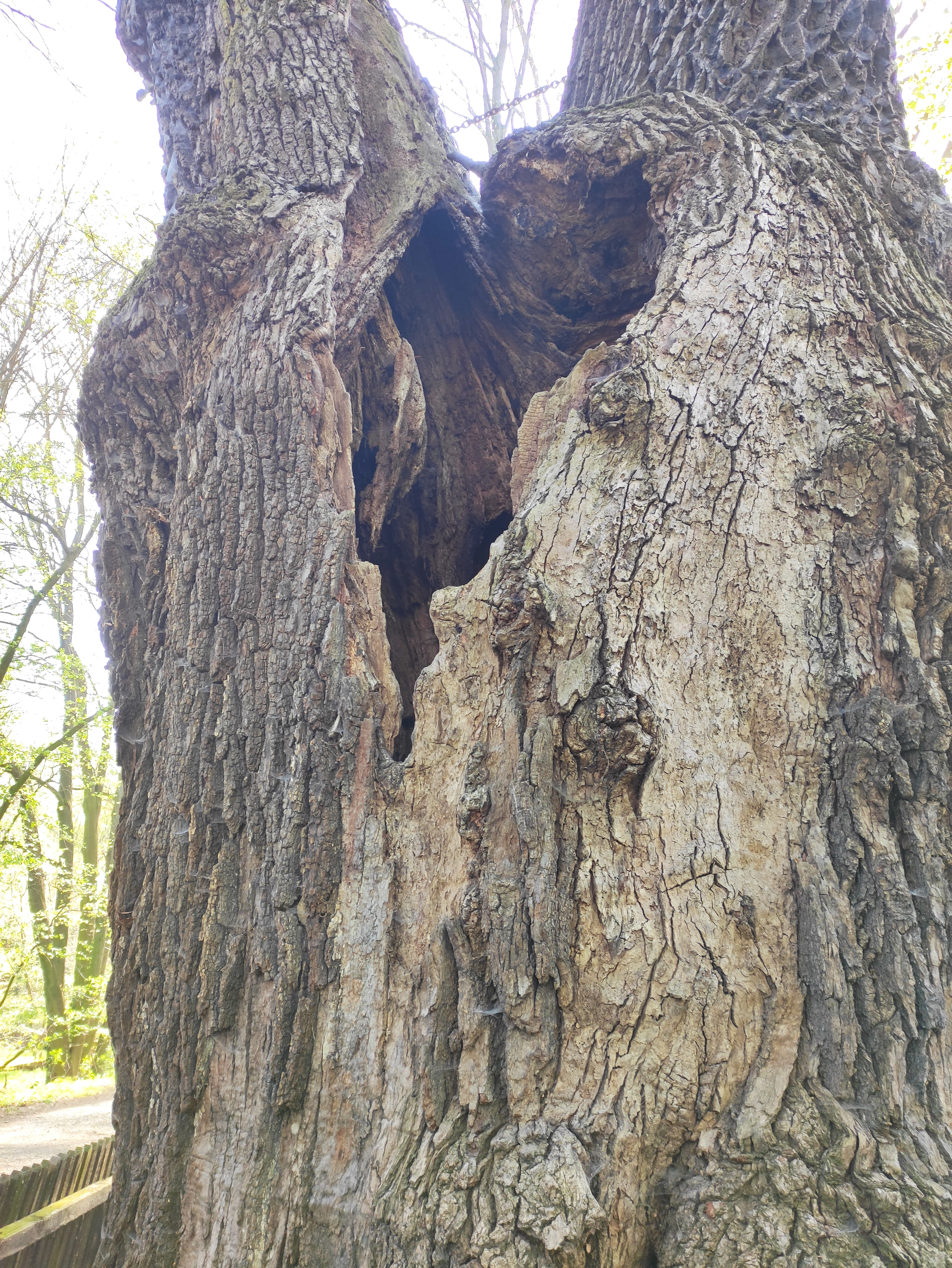

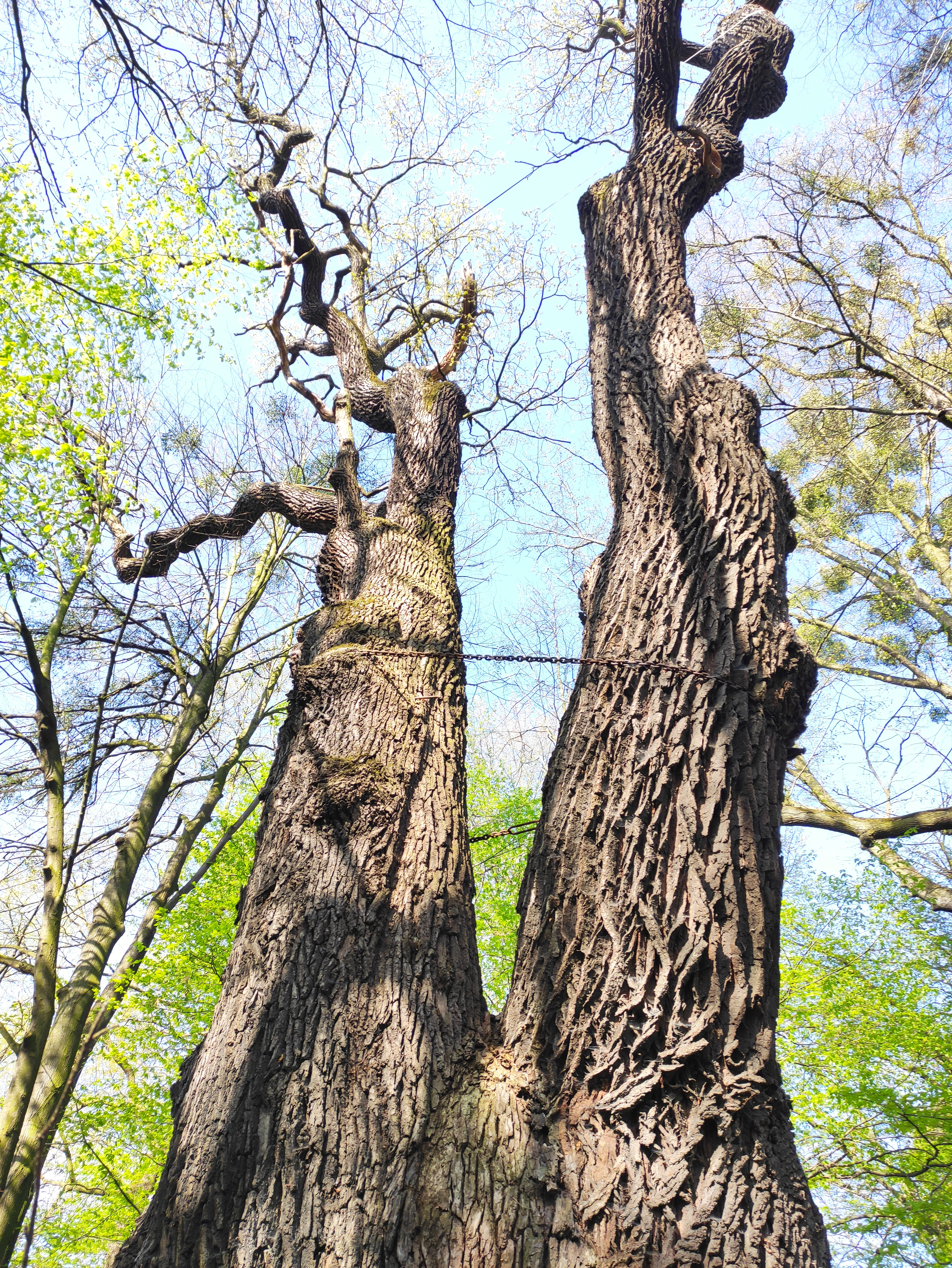

In 1922, the entire area of Łężczok, which was then within the borders of Germany, was legally protected. After World War II, Poles also decided to protect this area by establishing it as a nature reserve in 1957. Ten years later, by decision of the Presidium of the Provincial National Council in Opole on 14 April 1967, the tree was granted individual protection, becoming a natural monument. The decision to recognize the tree as a natural monument was also reaffirmed by the Silesian Voivode in a regulation dated 9 March 2006.

In the 1970s, the crack left by the third trunk was sealed with a concrete plug by Franciszek Polaczek, a forester from Nędza, on his own initiative. However, it turned out that this plug accelerated the decay of the trunk. Around the year 2000, the plug began to visibly collapse until it finally collapsed completely in the summer of 2002, revealing a hole with a diameter of 1 m. Also in the 1970s, two trunks were encircled with a metal chain at a height of 10 m to protect them from splitting. However, the use of the metal chain caused the two main trunks of the oak to die due to pressure on the vascular cambium. During subsequent procedures, a significant portion of the lower branches was removed, thus changing the shape of the tree, which is now devoid of branches up to a considerable height. From 1993 to 1994, conservation work on the old oaks in Łężczok was carried out by Stefan Kisielewski, a specialist in tree care and protection. In 1998, employees of Piotr Kamiński's Tree Surgery and Care Department from Żory performed a full range of crown cuts on the oak, removed metal caps from places where branches had been cut, and cleared deep cavities. Since the metal chain at a height of 10 m did not provide full protection, an elastic tape with a strength of up to 8 tons was also installed at a height of 20 m.

== See also ==
- List of individual trees

== Bibliography ==
- Żukowski, Aleksander (2006). Sławne drzewa województwa śląskiego (in Polish). Czerwionka-Leszczyny: Agencja Reklamowo-Wydawnicza "Vectra". ISBN 83-922220-2-4.
