= Szymocice =

- Village
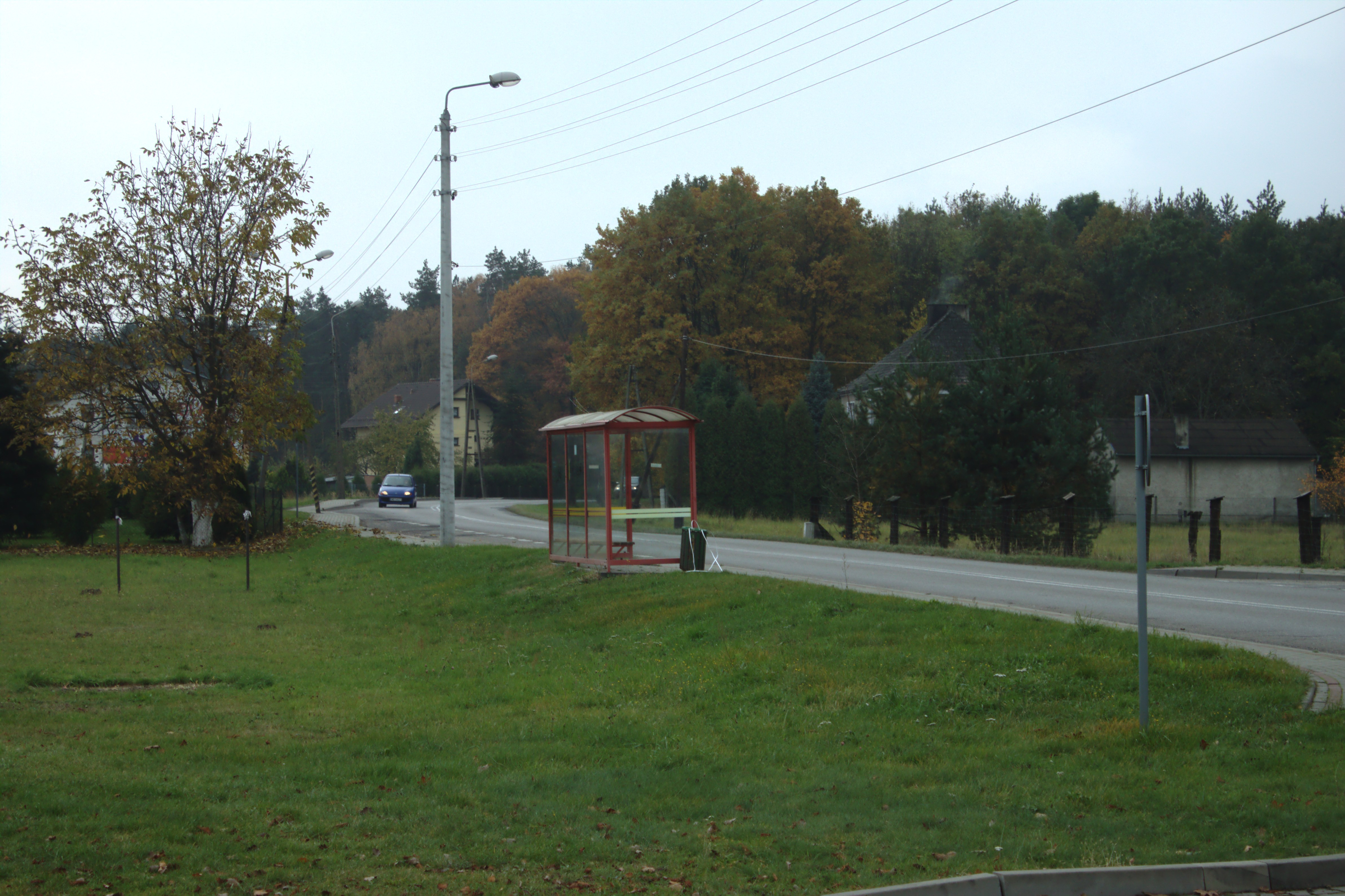
- Bus stop

- Location within Poland
- Coordinates: 50°9′42″N 18°22′10″E
- Country: Poland
- Voivodeship: Silesian
- County: Racibórz
- Gmina: Nędza
- Population: 304

Szymocice (Polish: [ʂɨmɔˈt͡ɕit͡sɛ]) is a village in the administrative district of Gmina Nędza, within Racibórz County, Silesian Voivodeship, in southern Poland.

== Gallery ==
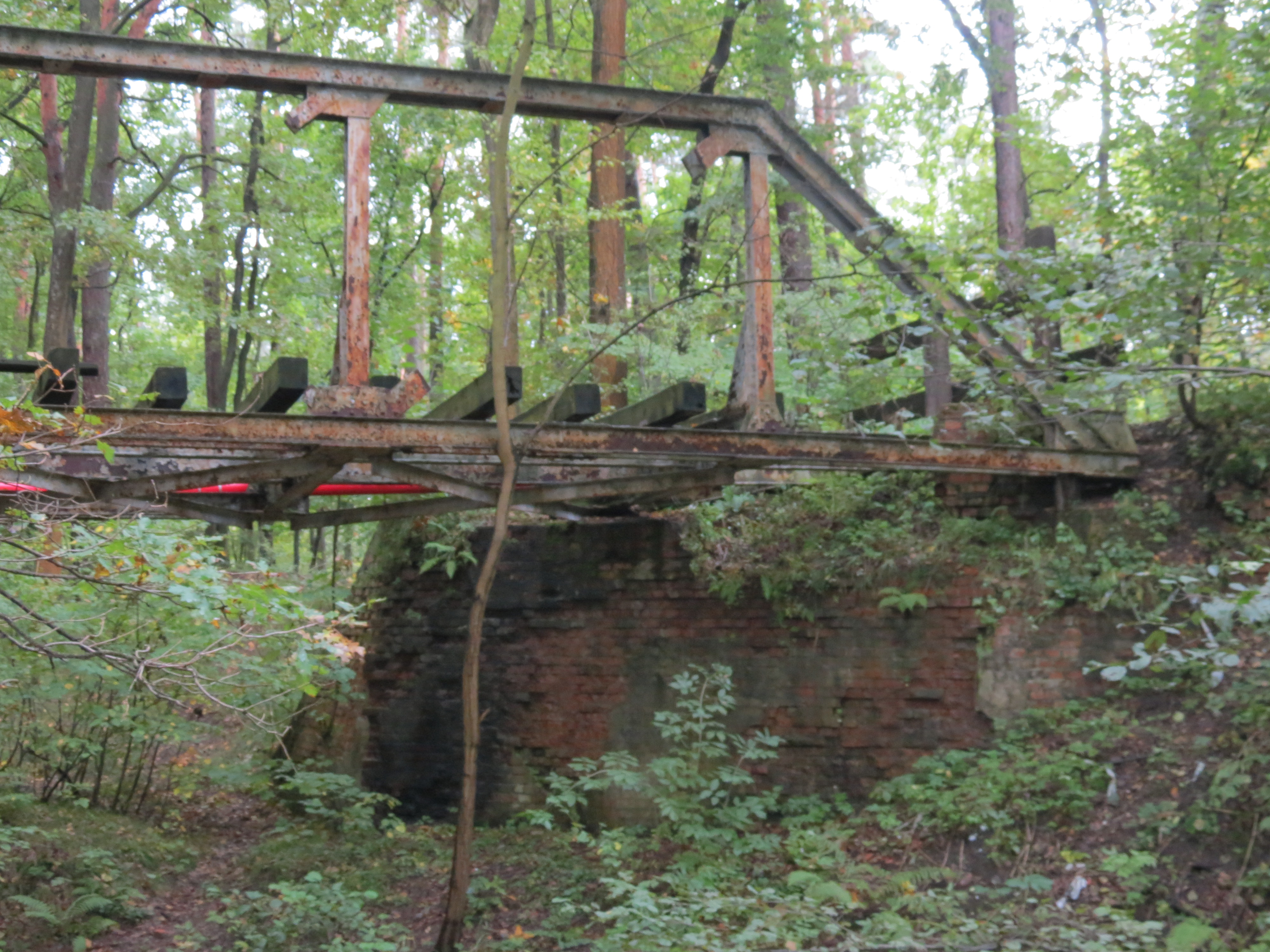
Old brige

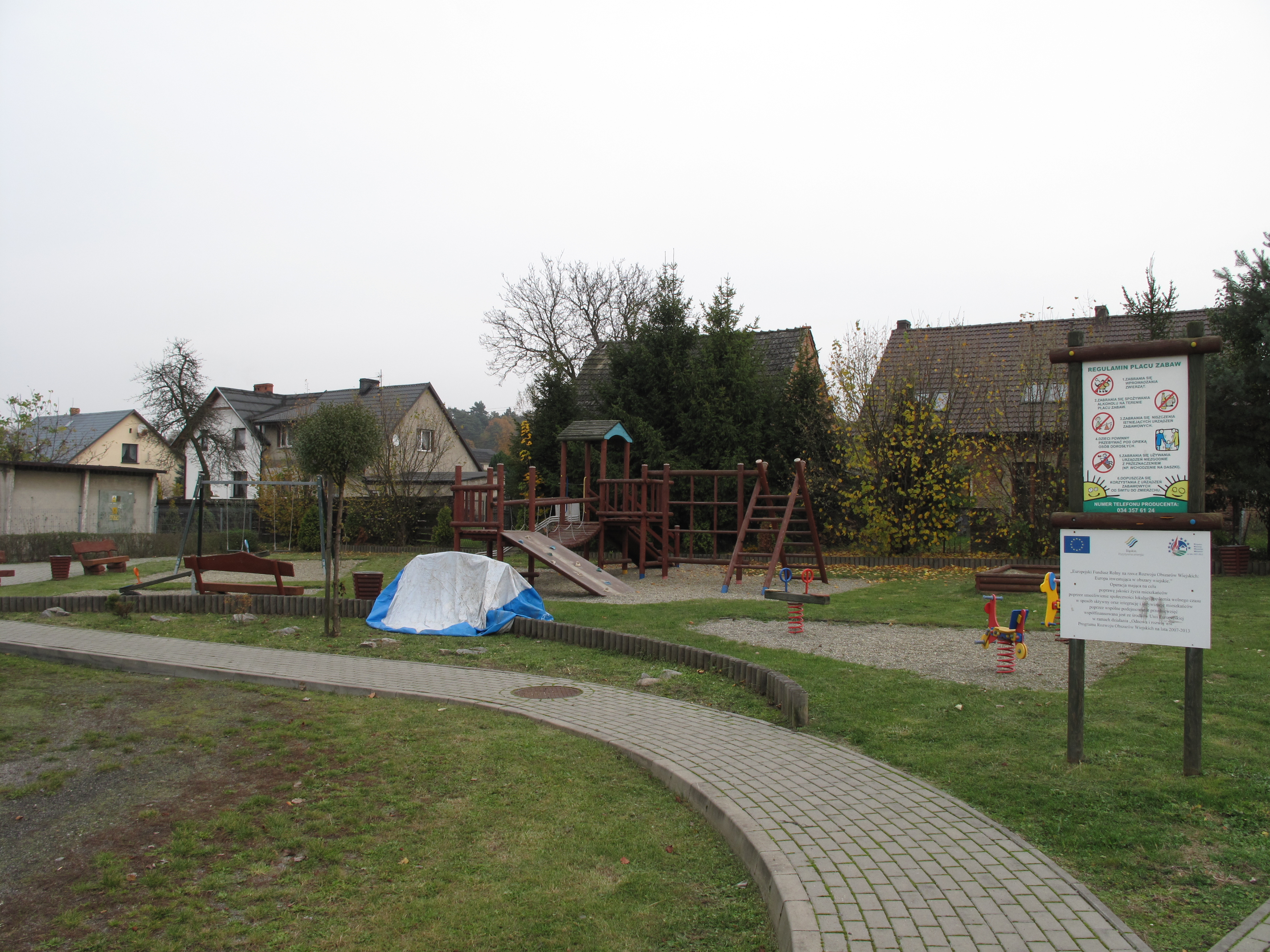
Playground

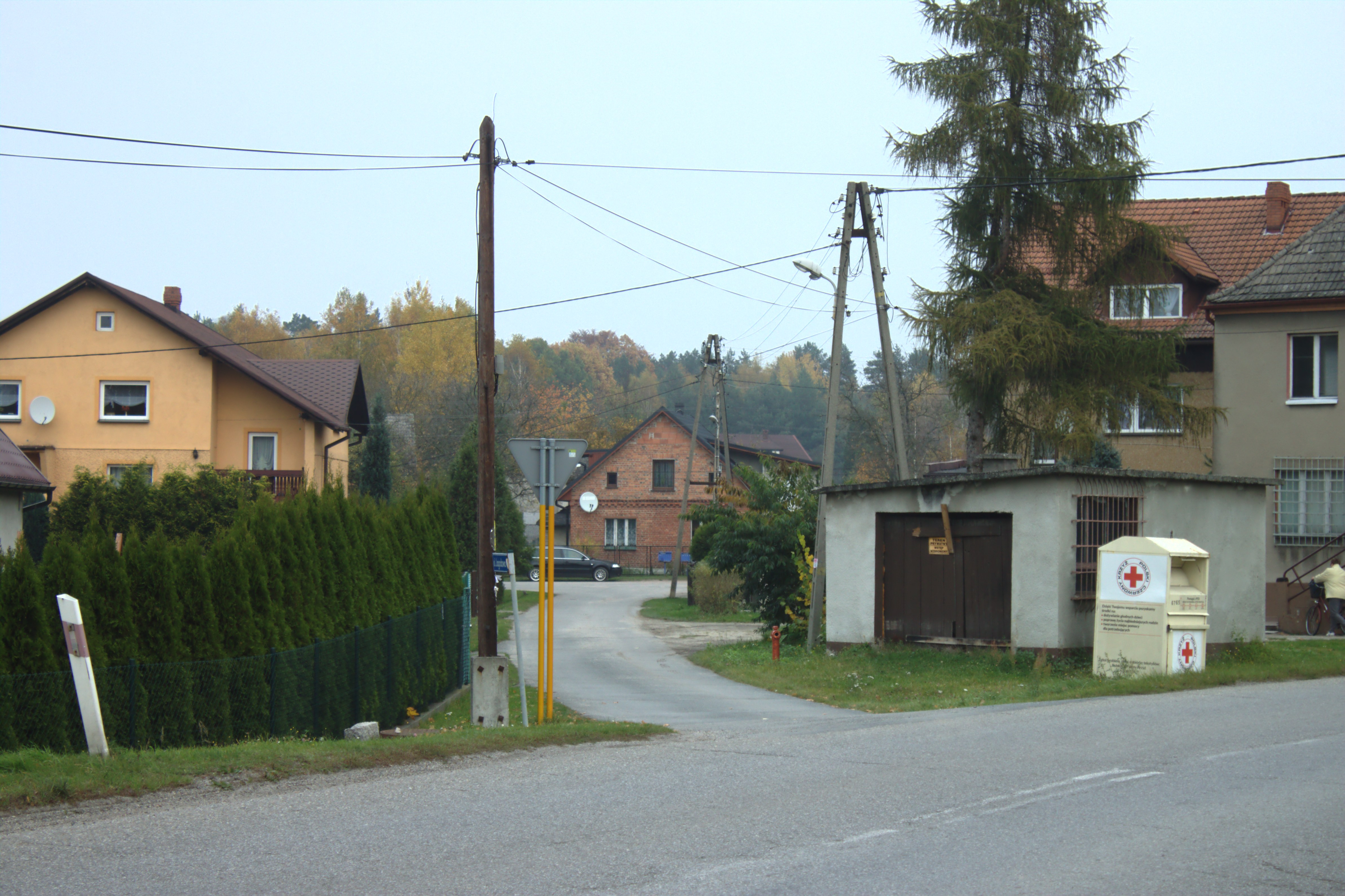
Houses
