= Górki Śląskie =

- Village
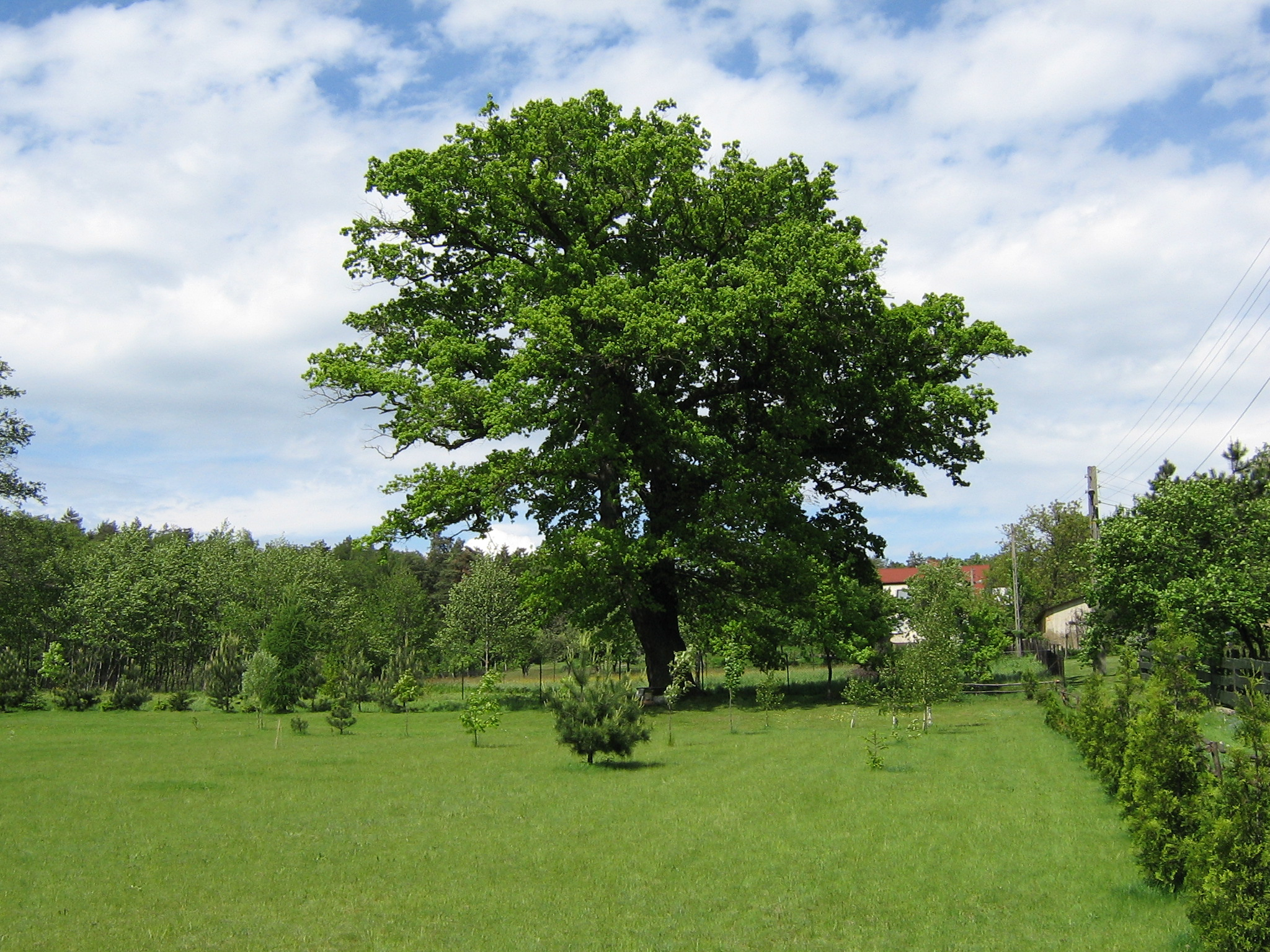
- More than 200-year-old oak

- Location within Poland
- Coordinates: 50°8′32″N 18°23′25″E
- Country: Poland
- Voivodeship: Silesian
- County: Racibórz
- Gmina: Nędza
- Population: 921

Górki Śląskie [ˈɡurki ˈɕlɔ̃skʲɛ] is a village in the administrative district of Gmina Nędza, within Racibórz County, Silesian Voivodeship, in southern Poland.

== Gallery ==
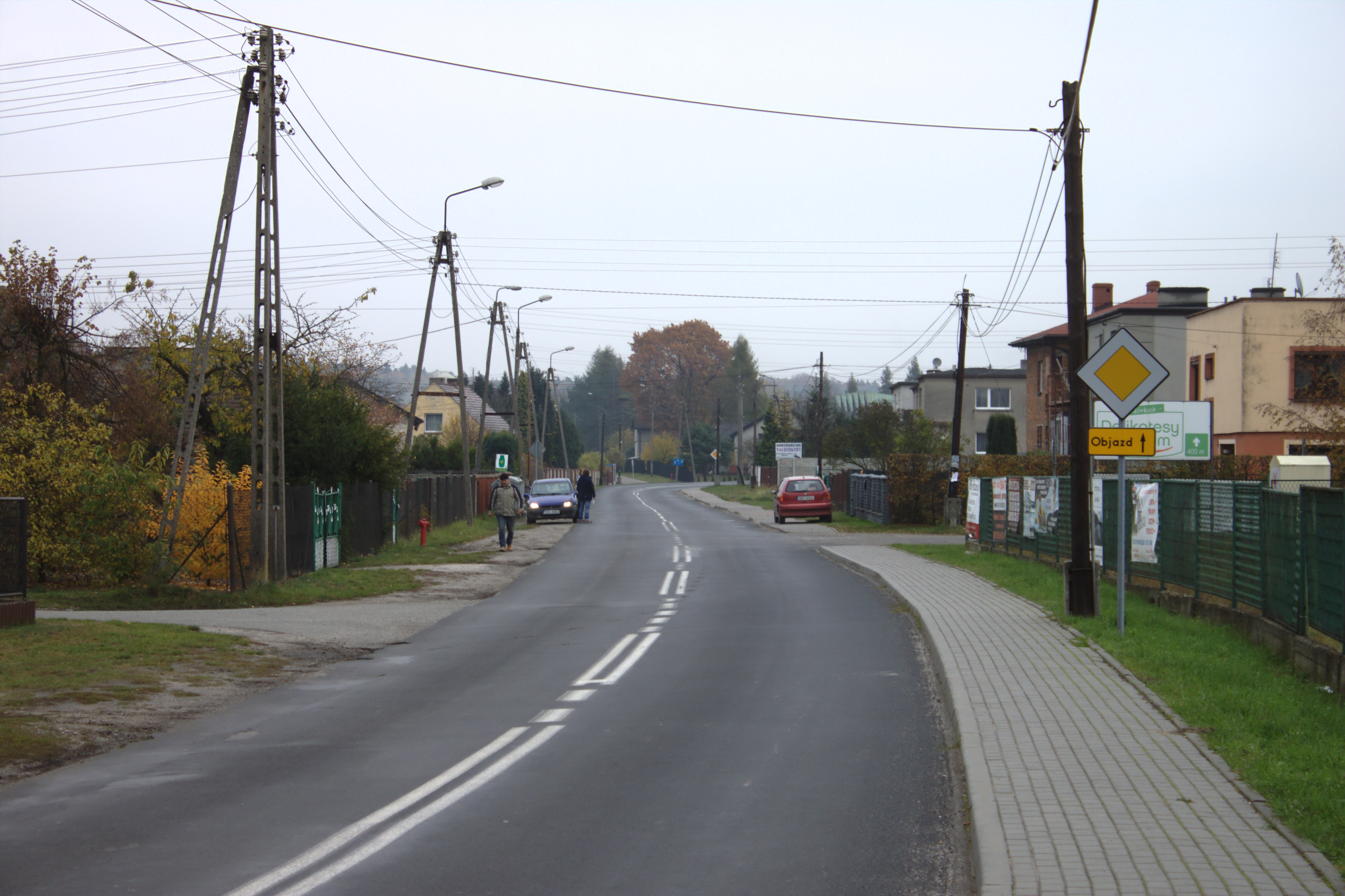
Main road

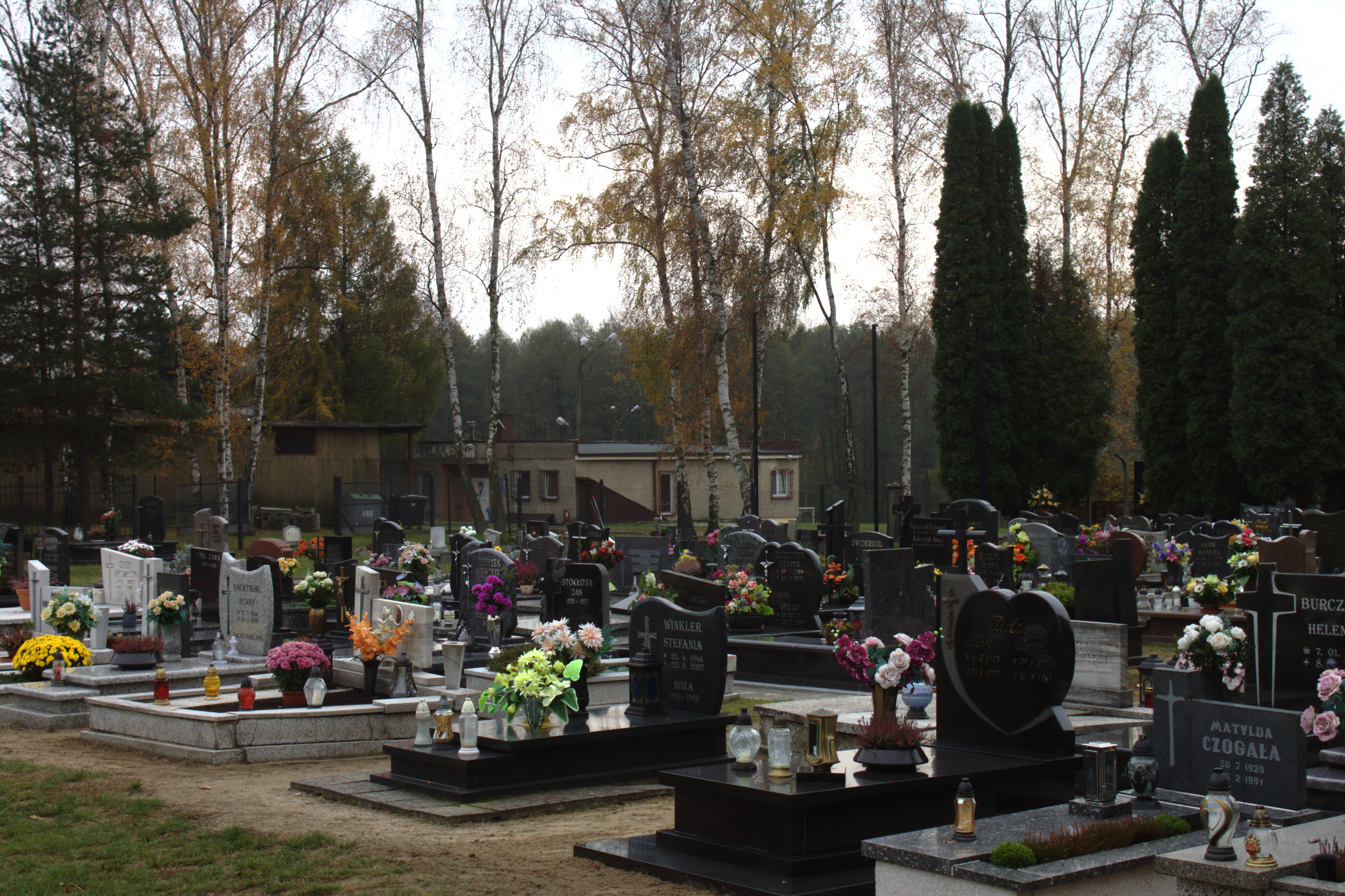
Cemetery

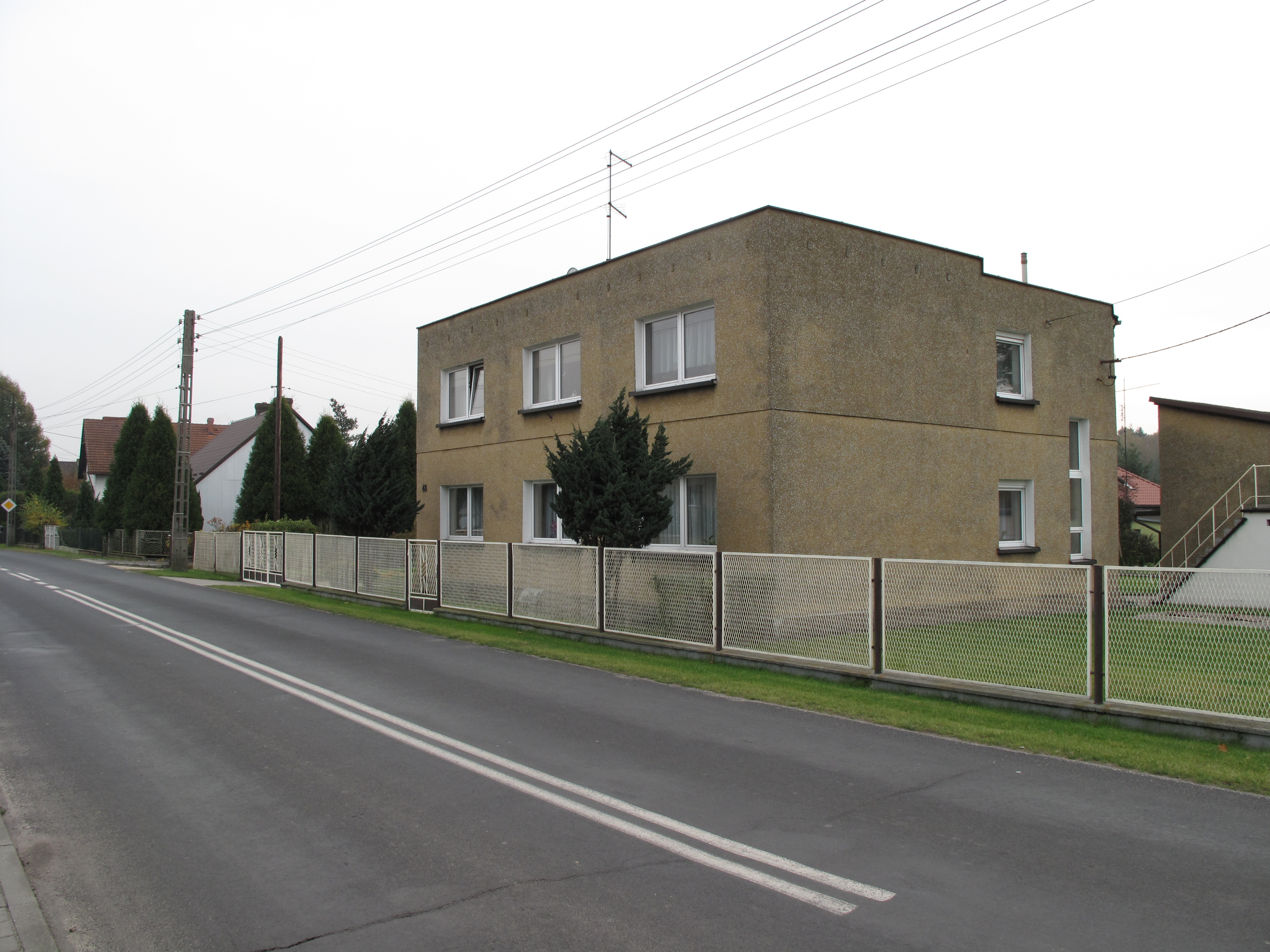
House
