= Zawada Książęca =

- Village
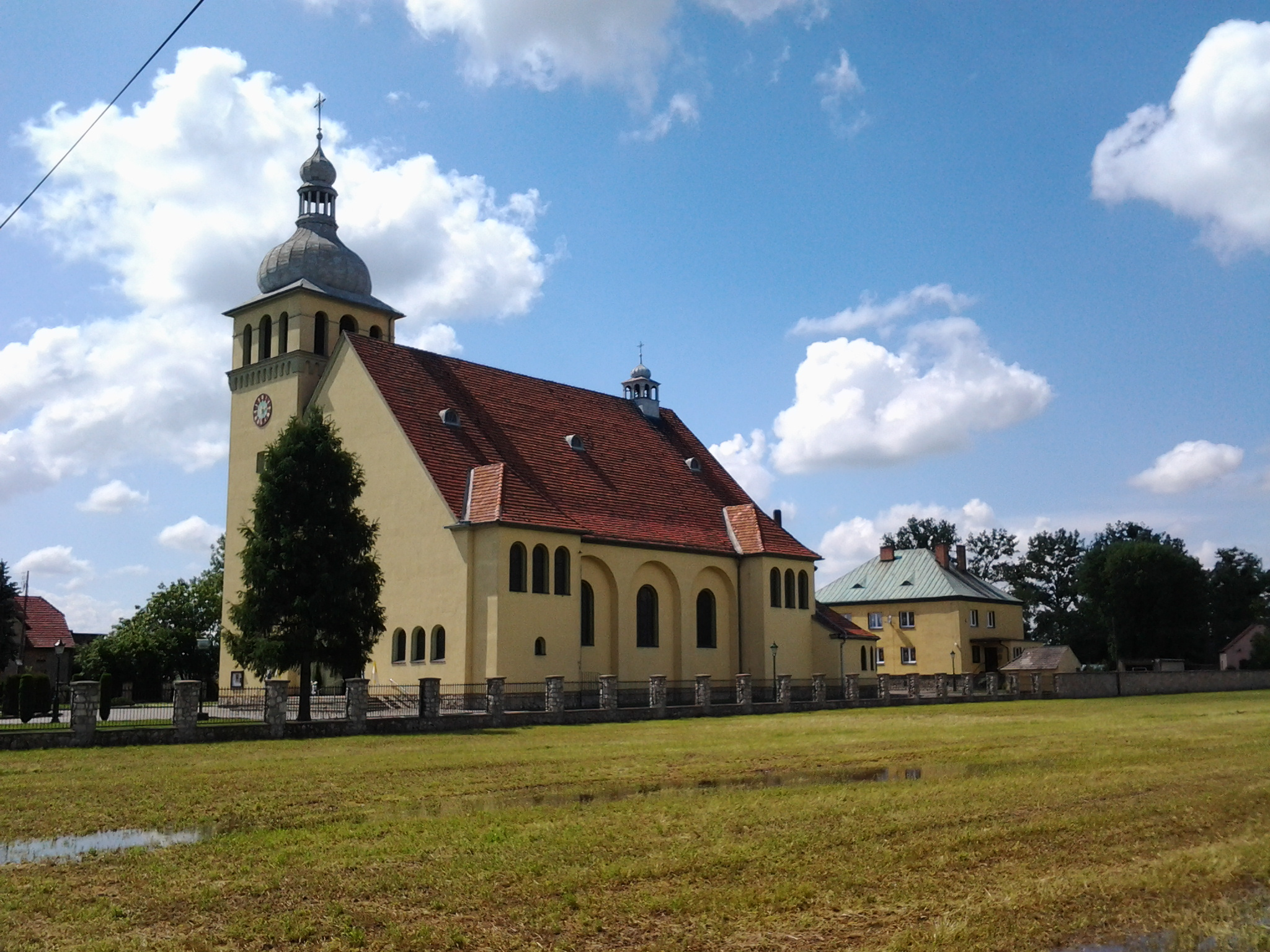
- Catholic church

- Location within Poland
- Coordinates: 50°9′15″N 18°15′29″E
- Country: Poland
- Voivodeship: Silesian
- County: Racibórz
- Gmina: Nędza
- Population: 816

Zawada Książęca [zaˈvada kɕɔ̃ˈʐɛnt͡sa] is a village in the administrative district of Gmina Nędza, within Racibórz County, Silesian Voivodeship, in southern Poland.

== Geography ==
The village stands on the right bank of the Oder River. Part of the village belongs to a protected area called Rudy Landscape Park.

== History ==
Zawada Książęca was established in year 1310 as a colony for toll collection, belonging to the Piast Duchy of Racibórz. In 1532, the last prince of Piast dynasty dies. The Duchy is taken over by the Margrave of Brandenburg, Georg Hohenzollern, who in 1512, under the will of the King Vladislaus II of Hungary, won the dispute over Ratibor-Opole succession. The period of religious wars begins. Since 1551, Zawada belongs to the Habsburg Monarchy.

The Ratibor land is subject to numerous pledges in financial and dynastic interests. After the Silesian wars, since year 1743 Zawada Książęca is under Prussian rule till 1945.

Since 1945 Zawada Książęca is part of Poland.
