= Łęg, Racibórz County =

Łęg
- Village
- Location within Poland
- Coordinates: 50°8′N 18°14′E
- Country: Poland
- Voivodeship: Silesian
- County: Racibórz
- Gmina: Nędza
- Population: 451
- Website: http://www.nedza.pl/leg.htm

Łęg [wɛnk] is a village in the administrative district of Gmina Nędza, within Racibórz County, Silesian Voivodeship, in southern Poland.
