= Babice, Silesian Voivodeship =

Babice
- Village
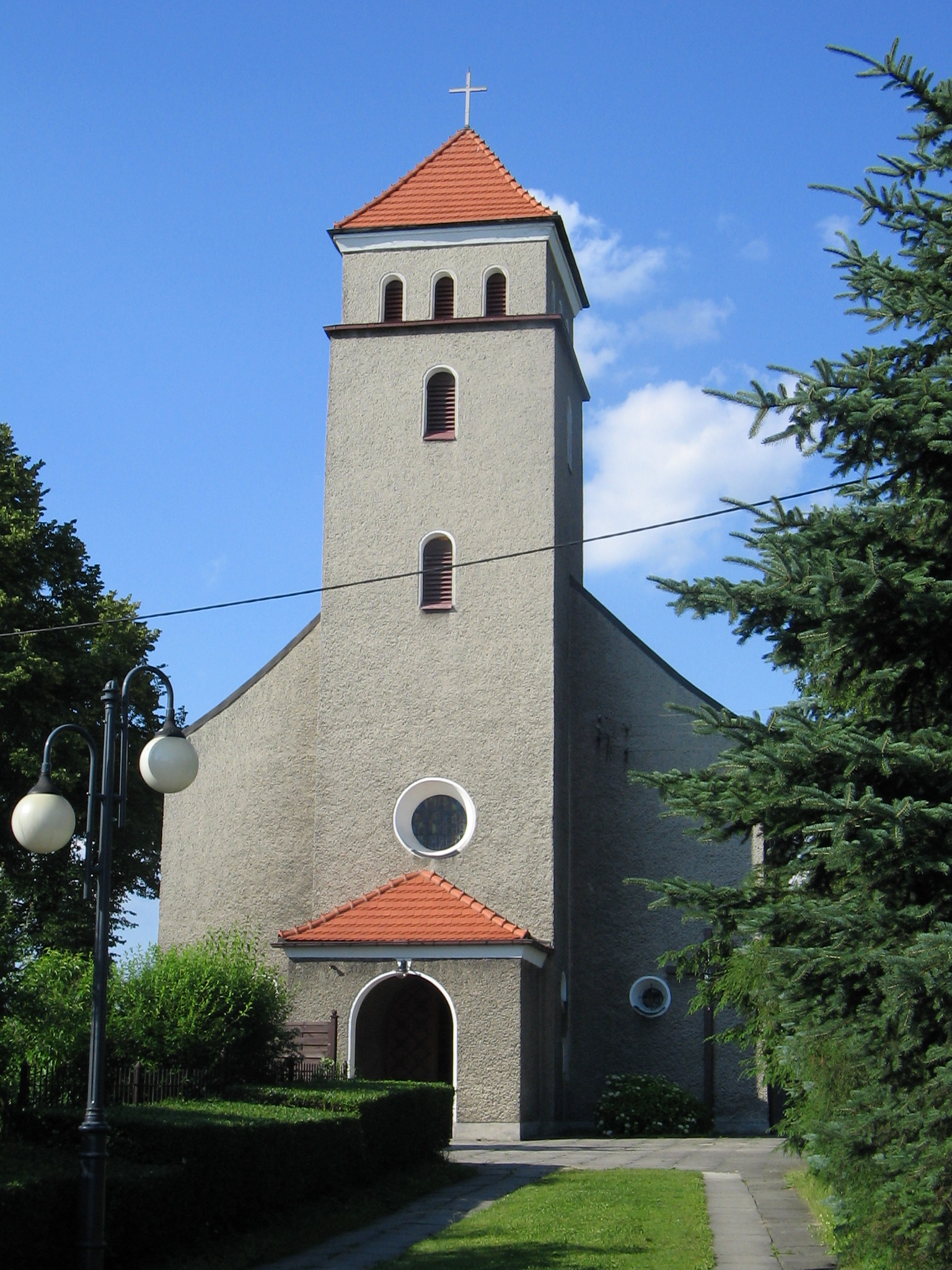
- Catholic church

- Location within Poland
- Coordinates: 50°8′17″N 18°17′57″E
- Country: Poland
- Voivodeship: Silesian
- County: Racibórz
- Gmina: Nędza
- Population: 864
- Website: www.sw-anna.babice.gliwice.opoka.org.pl

Babice (Polish: [baˈbit͡sɛ]) is a village in the administrative district of Gmina Nędza, within Racibórz County, Silesian Voivodeship, in southern Poland.
