= Ciechowice =

- Village
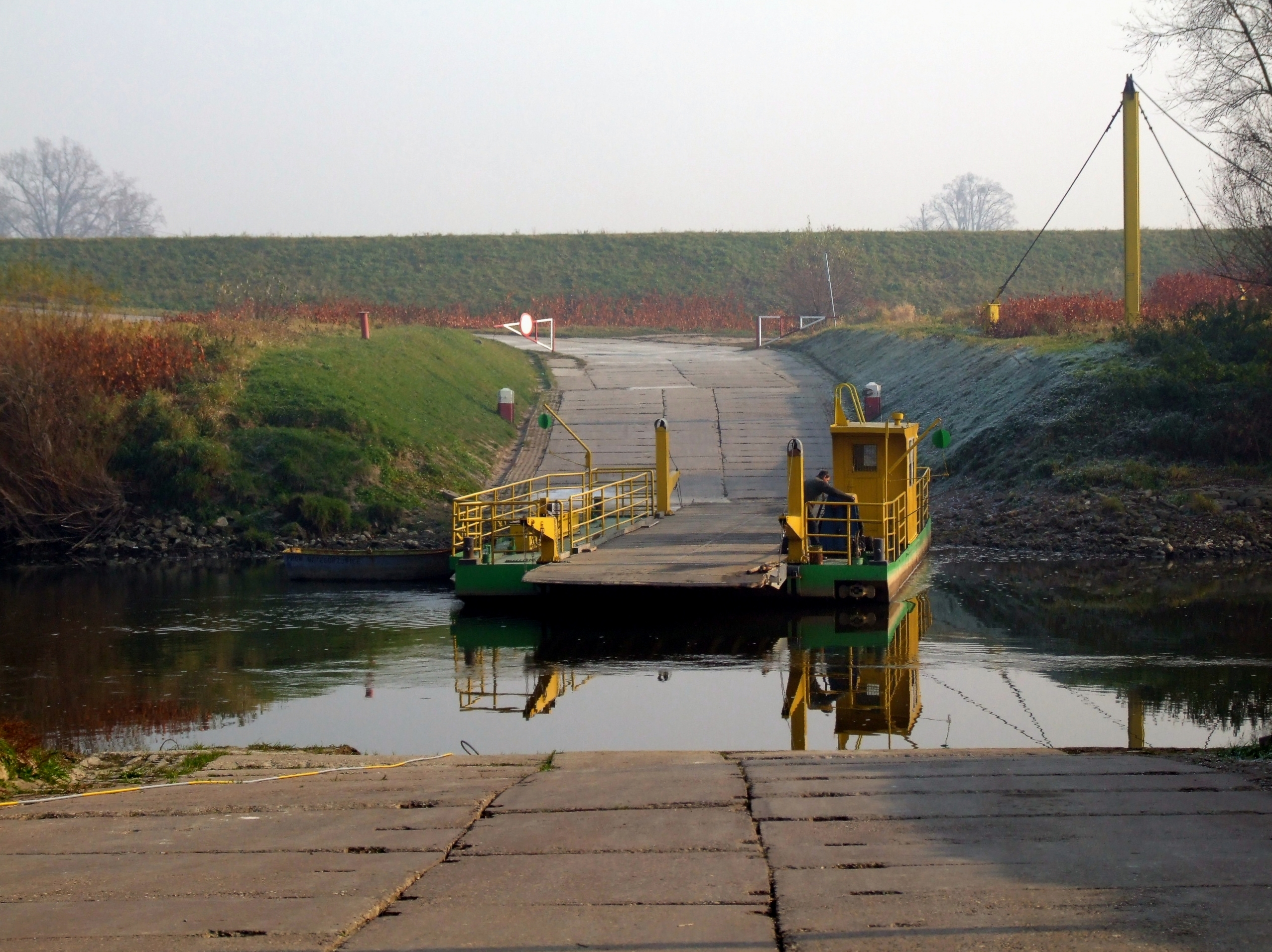

- Location within Poland
- Coordinates: 50°10′N 18°16′E
- Country: Poland
- Voivodeship: Silesian
- County: Racibórz
- Gmina: Nędza
- Population: 483

Ciechowice [t͡ɕɛxɔˈvit͡sɛ] is a village in the administrative district of Gmina Nędza, within Racibórz County, Silesian Voivodeship, in southern Poland.
