= Czerwięcice =

- Village
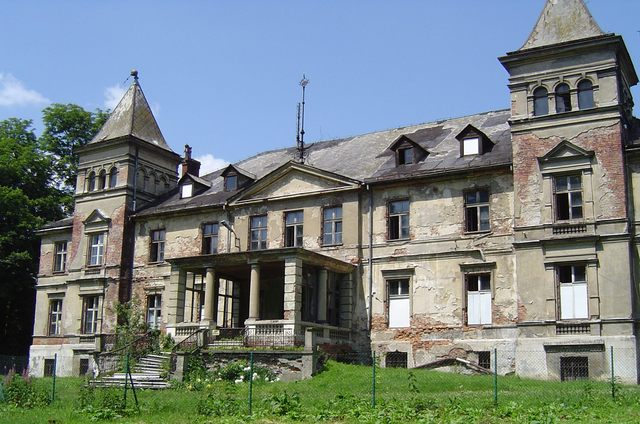
- Palace in Czerwięcice

- Location within Poland
- Coordinates: 50°9′28″N 18°11′2″E
- Country: Poland
- Voivodeship: Silesian
- County: Racibórz
- Gmina: Rudnik
- Population: 130

Czerwięcice [t͡ʂɛrvjɛnˈt͡ɕit͡sɛ] is a village in the administrative district of Gmina Rudnik, within Racibórz County, Silesian Voivodeship, in Southern Poland.

== Gallery ==
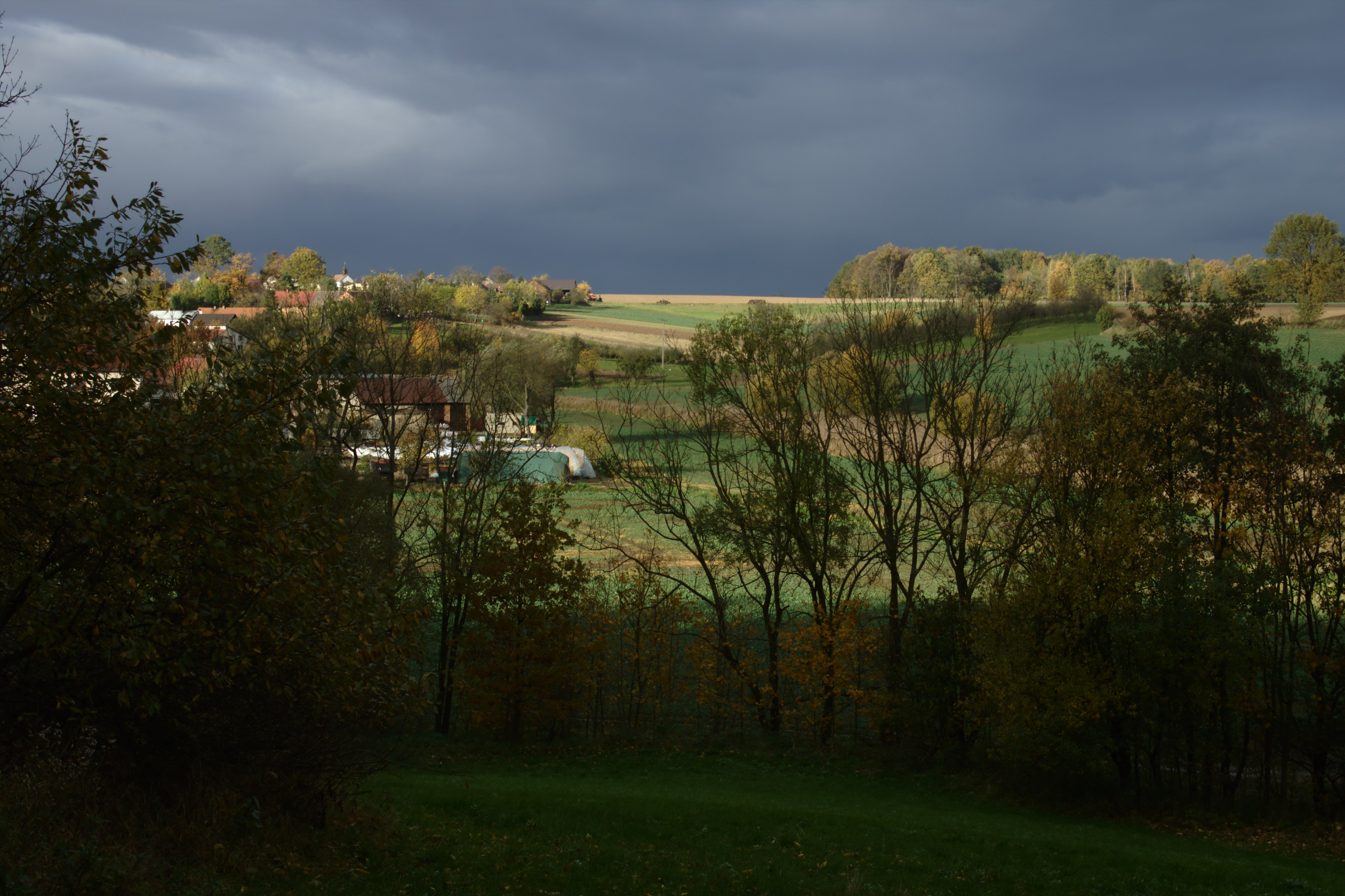
Countryside

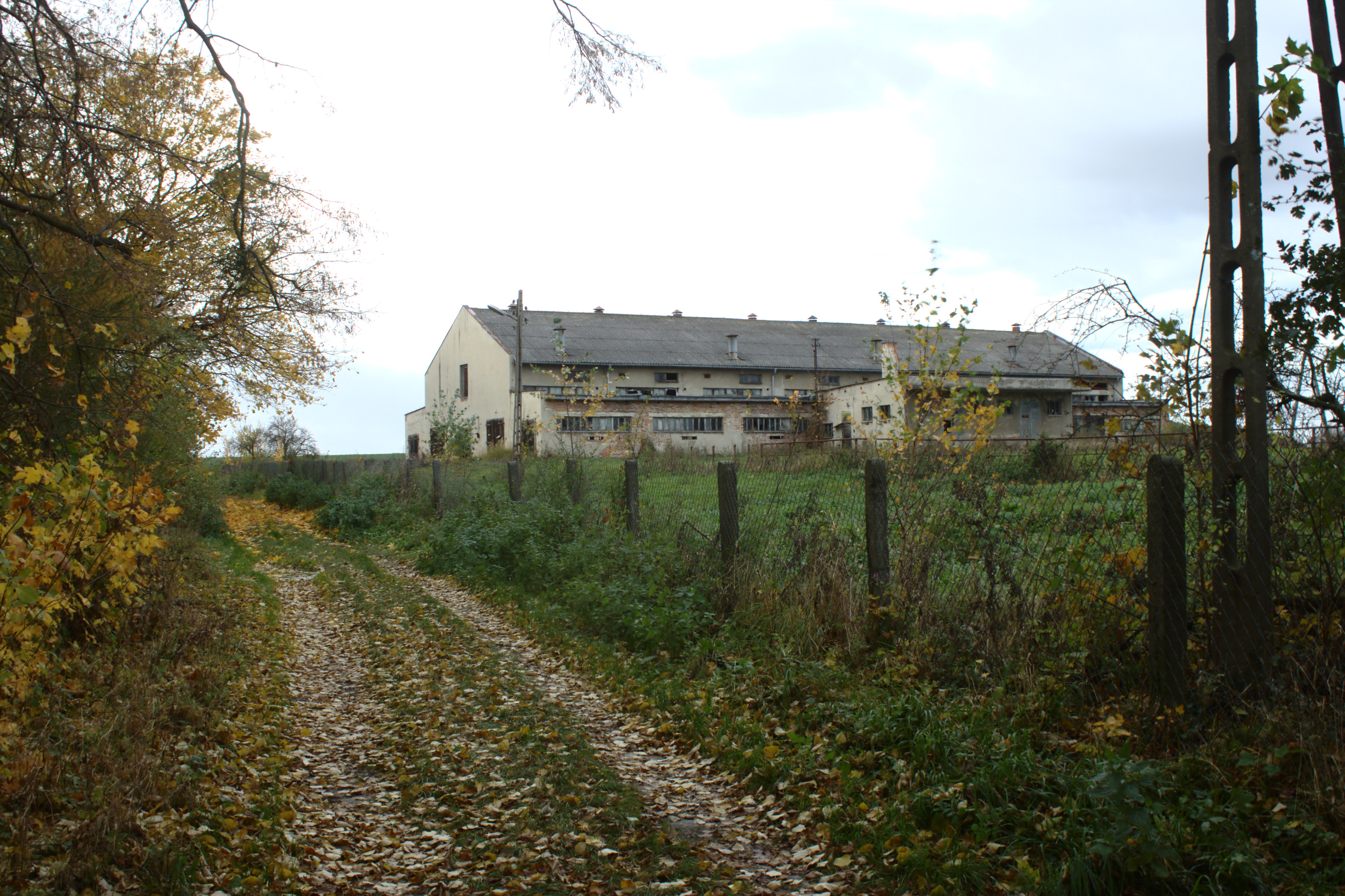
Farm

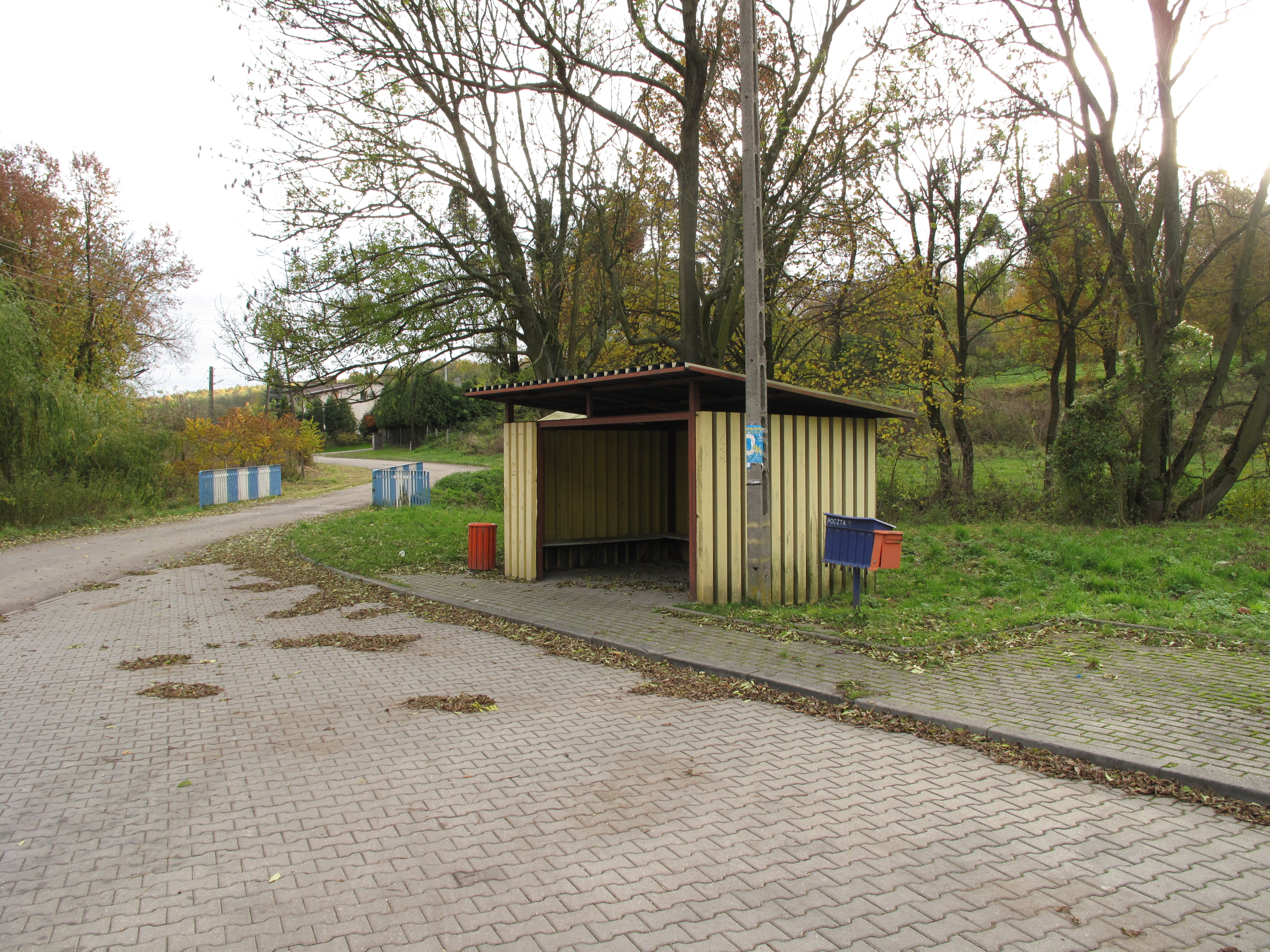
Bus stop
