= Rudy Landscape Park =

Protected area in southern Poland

Coordinates: 50.1889°N 18.4769°E

- Park Krajobrazowy Cysterskie Kompozycje Krajobrazowe Rud Wielkich
- IUCN category V (protected landscape/seascape)
- Interactive map of Rudy Landscape Park
- Location: Silesian Voivodeship
- Area: 493.87 km^{2} (190.68 sq mi)
- Established: 1993

Rudy Landscape Park (full name Park Krajobrazowy Cysterskie Kompozycje Krajobrazowe Rud Wielkich: "Landscape Park of the Cistercian Landscape Compositions of Rudy Wielkie") is a protected area (landscape park) in southern Poland, established in 1993, covering an area of 493.87 square kilometres (190.68 sq mi).

The Park lies within Silesian Voivodeship: in Gliwice County (Gmina Pilchowice, Gmina Sośnicowice), Pszczyna County (Gmina Suszec), Racibórz County (Gmina Nędza) and Rybnik County (Gmina Czerwionka-Leszczyny, Gmina Gaszowice, Gmina Jejkowice, Gmina Lyski).

Protected are the remnants of natural riparian and oak-hornbeam forests, typical of the upper Odra valley, as well as ponds - breeding grounds for birds and habitats of rare mud and water plants (e.g. yellow watercress, water caltrop). Monuments of animate and inanimate nature include an erratic boulder northeast of Rybnik-Paruszowiec.

== See also ==
- 1993 in the environment
- Sobieski Oak
