= Gmina Nędza =

Gmina Nędza Nędza Commune
- Gmina
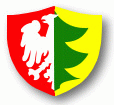
- Coat of arms
- Interactive map of Gmina Nędza
- Coordinates (Nędza): 50°9′38″N 18°18′39″E
- Country: Poland
- Voivodeship: Silesian
- County: Racibórz
- Seat: Nędza

Area
  - Total: 57.14 km^{2} (22.06 sq mi)

Population (2019-06-30)
  - Total: 7,433
  - Density: 130.1/km^{2} (336.9/sq mi)
- Website: http://www.nedza.pl

Gmina Nędza is a rural gmina (administrative district) in Racibórz County, Silesian Voivodeship, in southern Poland. Its seat is the village of Nędza, which lies approximately 11 kilometres (7 mi) north-east of Racibórz and 51 km (32 mi) west of the regional capital Katowice.

The gmina covers an area of 57.14 square kilometres (22.1 sq mi), and as of 2019, its total population was 7,433.

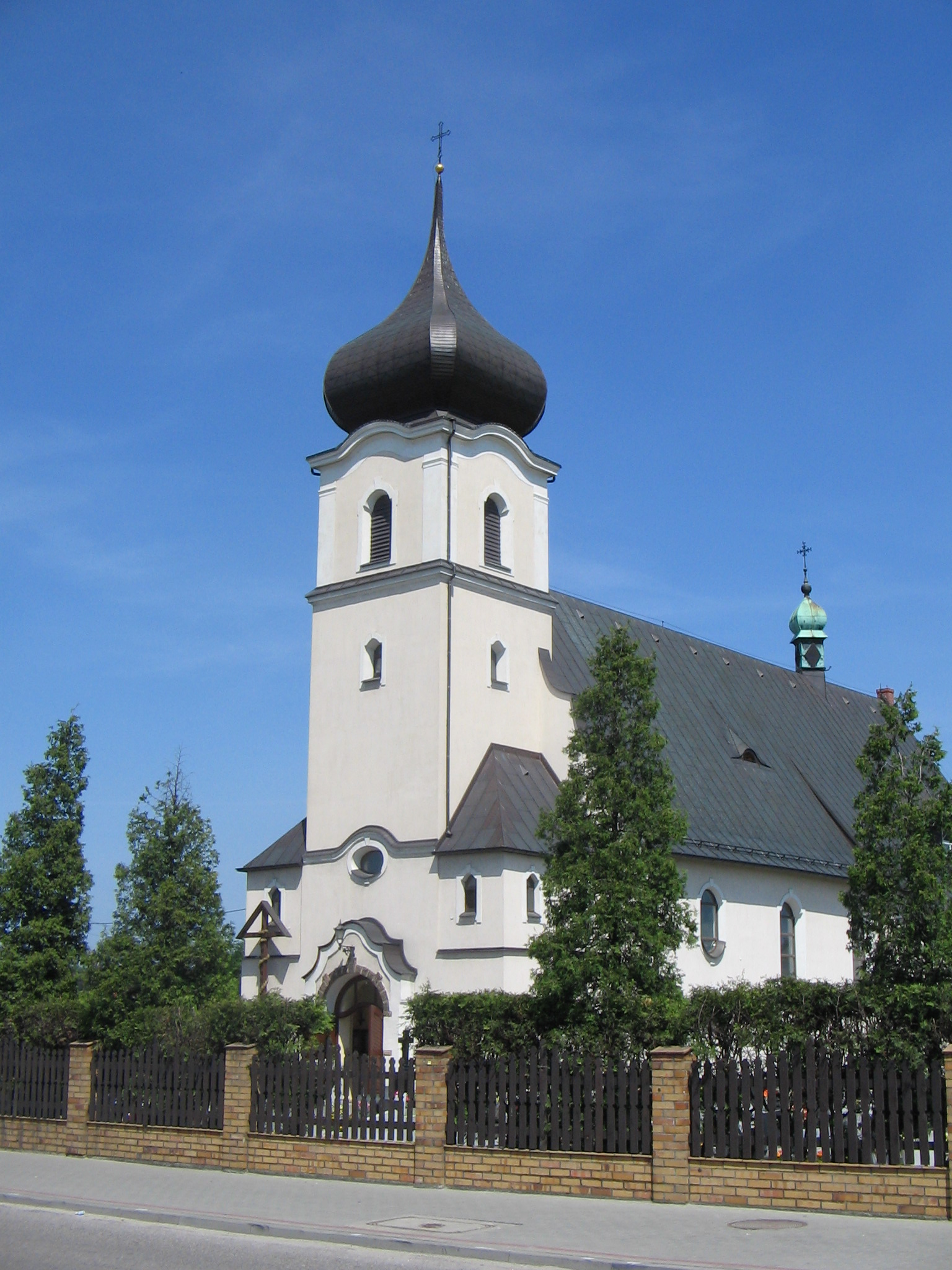

The gmina contains part of the protected area called the Rudy Landscape Park.

== Villages ==
Gmina Nędza contains the villages and settlements of Babice, Ciechowice, Górki Śląskie, Łęg, Nędza, Szymocice and Zawada Książęca.

== Neighbouring gminas ==
Gmina Nędza is bordered by the town of Racibórz and by the gminas of Kuźnia Raciborska, Lyski and Rudnik.

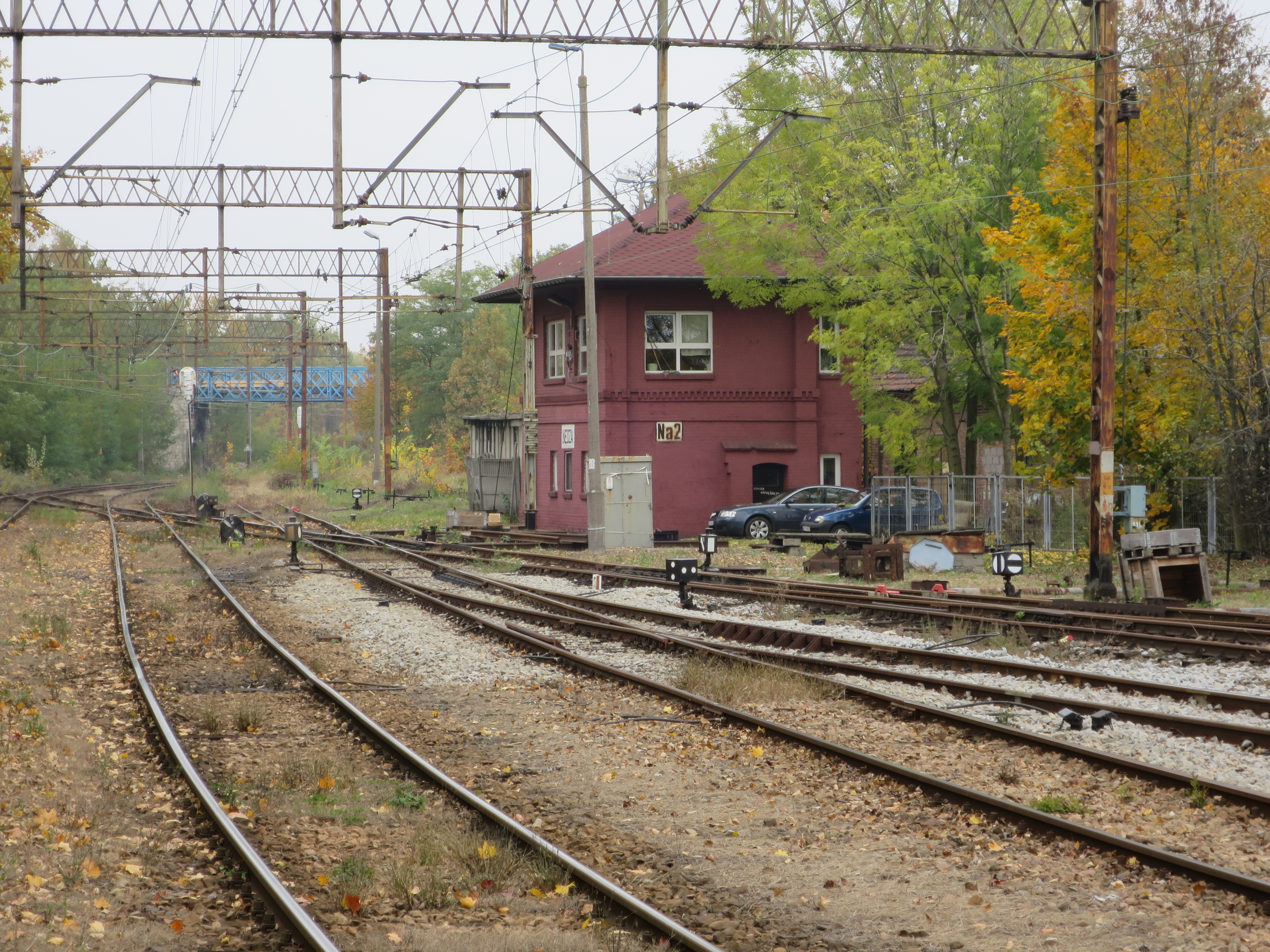
Railway in Nędza

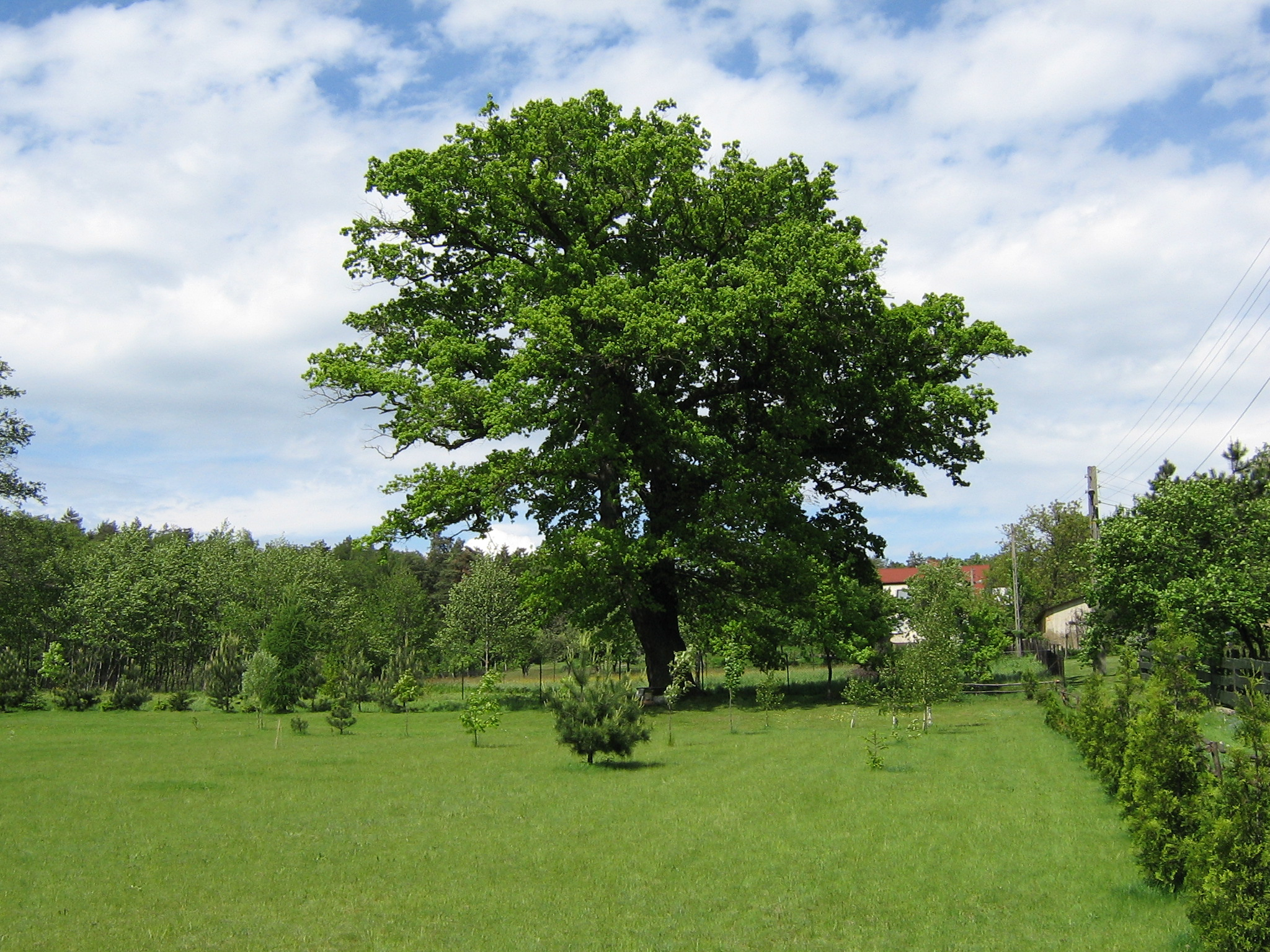
Oak in Górki Śląskie

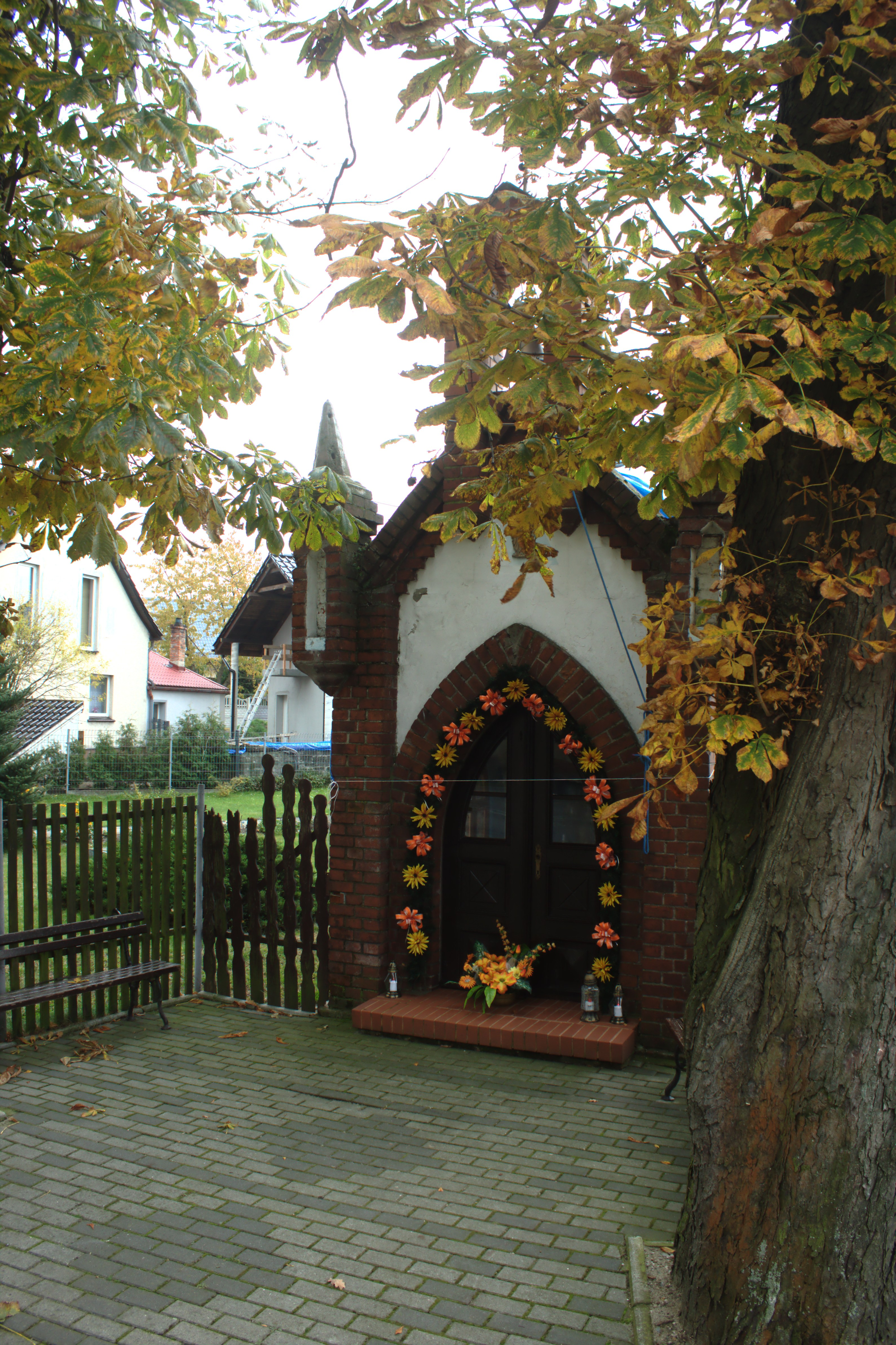
Village chapell in Szymocice
