= Nędza, Racibórz County =

Nędza
- Village
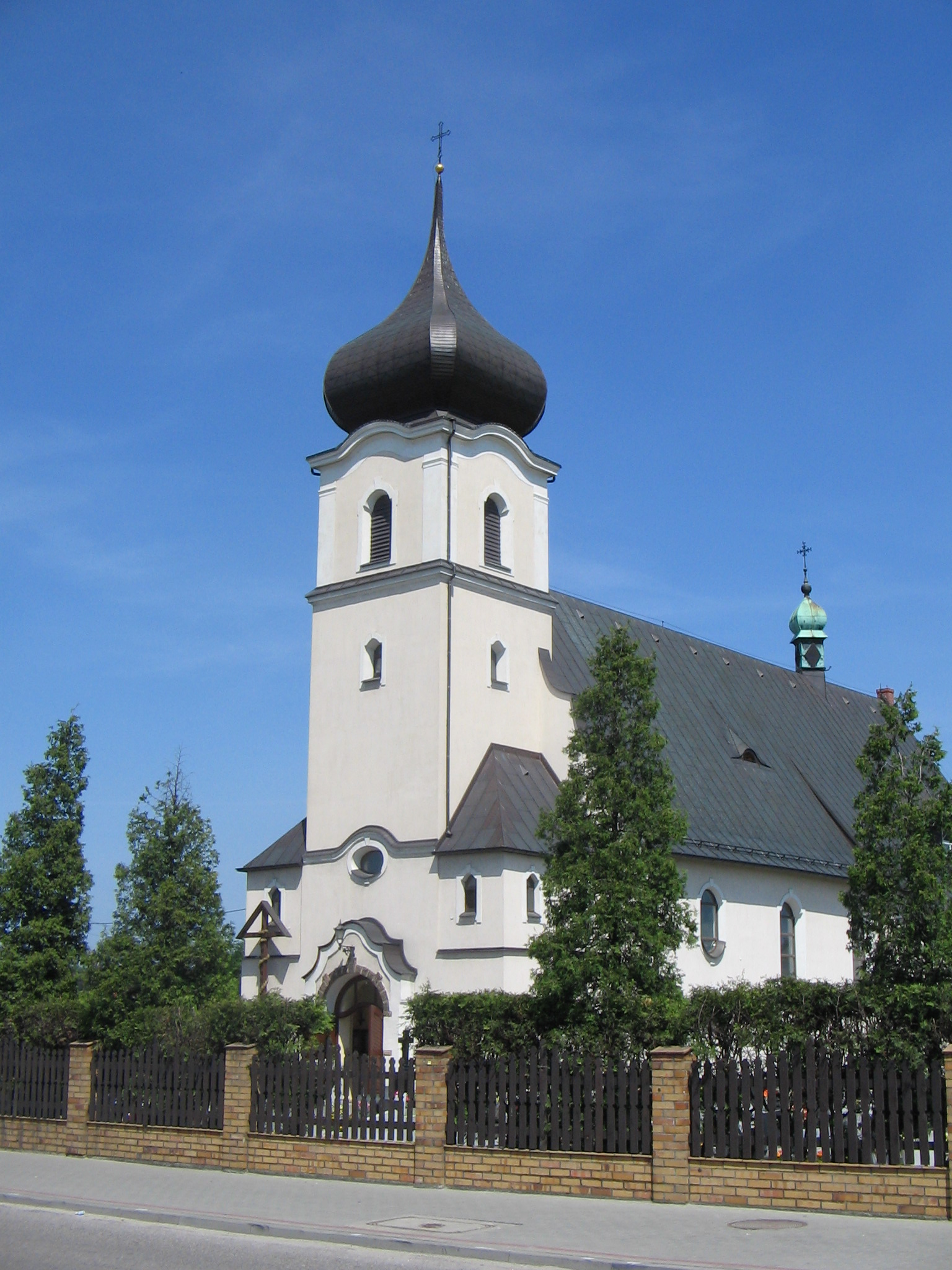
- Church in Nędza

- Location within Poland
- Coordinates: 50°9′N 18°18′E
- Country: Poland
- Voivodeship: Silesian
- County: Racibórz
- Gmina: Nędza
- Elevation: 198 m (650 ft)
- Population: 3,344
- Website: http://www.nedza.pl nedza.pl

Nędza [ˈnɛnd͡za] is a village in Racibórz County, Silesian Voivodeship, in southern Poland. It is the seat of the gmina (administrative district) called Gmina Nędza.

The village is a railroad junction, located on the main line from Kędzierzyn-Koźle to Racibórz. In Nędza, another line starts, which goes eastbound to Niedobczyce. As of the 2021 census, Nedza has a population of approximately 3,000 residents.
