= Racibórz County =

Racibórz County Powiat raciborski
- County
- Flag Coat of arms

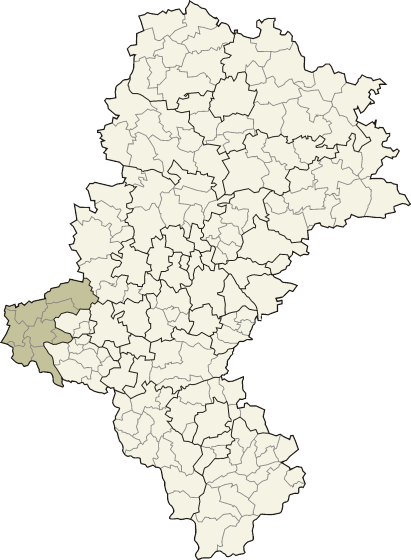
- Location within Silesian Voivodeship

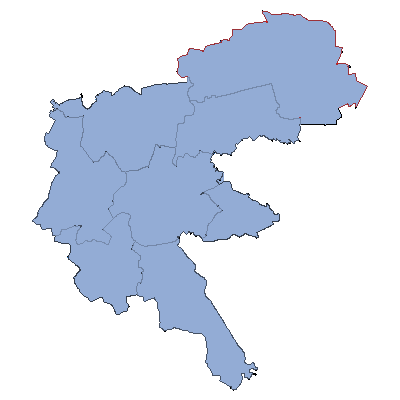
- Division into gminas
- Coordinates (Racibórz): 50°5′N 18°14′E
- Country: Poland
- Voivodeship: Silesian
- Seat: Racibórz
- Gminas: Total 8 (incl. 1 urban): Racibórz; Gmina Kornowac; Gmina Krzanowice; Gmina Krzyżanowice; Gmina Kuźnia Raciborska; Gmina Nędza; Gmina Pietrowice Wielkie; Gmina Rudnik

Area
  - Total: 543.98 km^{2} (210.03 sq mi)

Population (2019-06-30)
  - Total: 108,388
  - Density: 199.25/km^{2} (516.06/sq mi)
  - Urban: 62,294
  - Rural: 46,094
- Car plates: SRC
- Website: www.powiatraciborski.pl

Racibórz County (Polish: powiat raciborski) is a unit of territorial administration and local government (powiat) in Silesian Voivodeship, southern Poland, on the Czech border. It came into being on January 1, 1999, as a result of the Polish local government reforms passed in 1998. Its administrative seat and largest town is Racibórz, which lies 58 kilometres (36 mi) west of the regional capital Katowice. The county also contains the towns of Kuźnia Raciborska, lying 16 km (10 mi) north of Racibórz, and Krzanowice, 11 km (7 mi) south-west of Racibórz.

The county covers an area of 543.98 square kilometres (210.0 sq mi). As of 2019 its total population is 108,388, out of which the population of Racibórz is 54,778, that of Kuźnia Raciborska is 5,359, that of Krzanowice is 2,157, and the rural population is 46,094.

== Neighbouring counties ==
Racibórz County is bordered by Głubczyce County to the west, Kędzierzyn-Koźle County to the north, Gliwice County to the north-east, and the city of Rybnik, Rybnik County and Wodzisław County to the east. It also borders the Czech Republic to the south.

== Administrative divisions ==
The county is subdivided into eight gminas (one urban, two urban-rural and five rural). These are listed in the following table, in descending order of population.

Gmina	Type	Area (km^{2})	Population (2019)	Seat
Racibórz	urban	75.0	54,778	
Gmina Kuźnia Raciborska	urban-rural	126.8	11,851	Kuźnia Raciborska
Gmina Krzyżanowice	rural	69.7	11,301	Krzyżanowice
Gmina Nędza	rural	57.1	7,433	Nędza
Gmina Pietrowice Wielkie	rural	68.1	6,908	Pietrowice Wielkie
Gmina Krzanowice	urban-rural	47.1	5,739	Krzanowice
Gmina Kornowac	rural	26.3	5,190	Kornowac
Gmina Rudnik	rural	73.9	5,188	Rudnik

== See also ==
- Silesia Euroregion
