= Gamow =

Gamow may refer to:

- Gamów, a village in Poland
- Gamow (crater), a large impact crater on the far side of the Moon
- GAMOW, an acronym for the Godless Americans March on Washington
- George Gamow, theoretical physicist and prize-winning science writer

== See also ==
- Gamov
