= Gacki =

Gacki may refer to the following villages in Poland:

- Gacki, Kuyavian-Pomeranian Voivodeship
- Gacki, Pińczów County in Świętokrzyskie Voivodeship
- Gacki, Staszów County in Świętokrzyskie Voivodeship
- Gacki, Silesian Voivodeship
