= Gmina Rudnik =

Gmina Rudnik may refer to either of the following rural administrative districts in Poland:

- Gmina Rudnik, Lublin Voivodeship
- Gmina Rudnik, Silesian Voivodeship
