= Ponięcice =

- Village
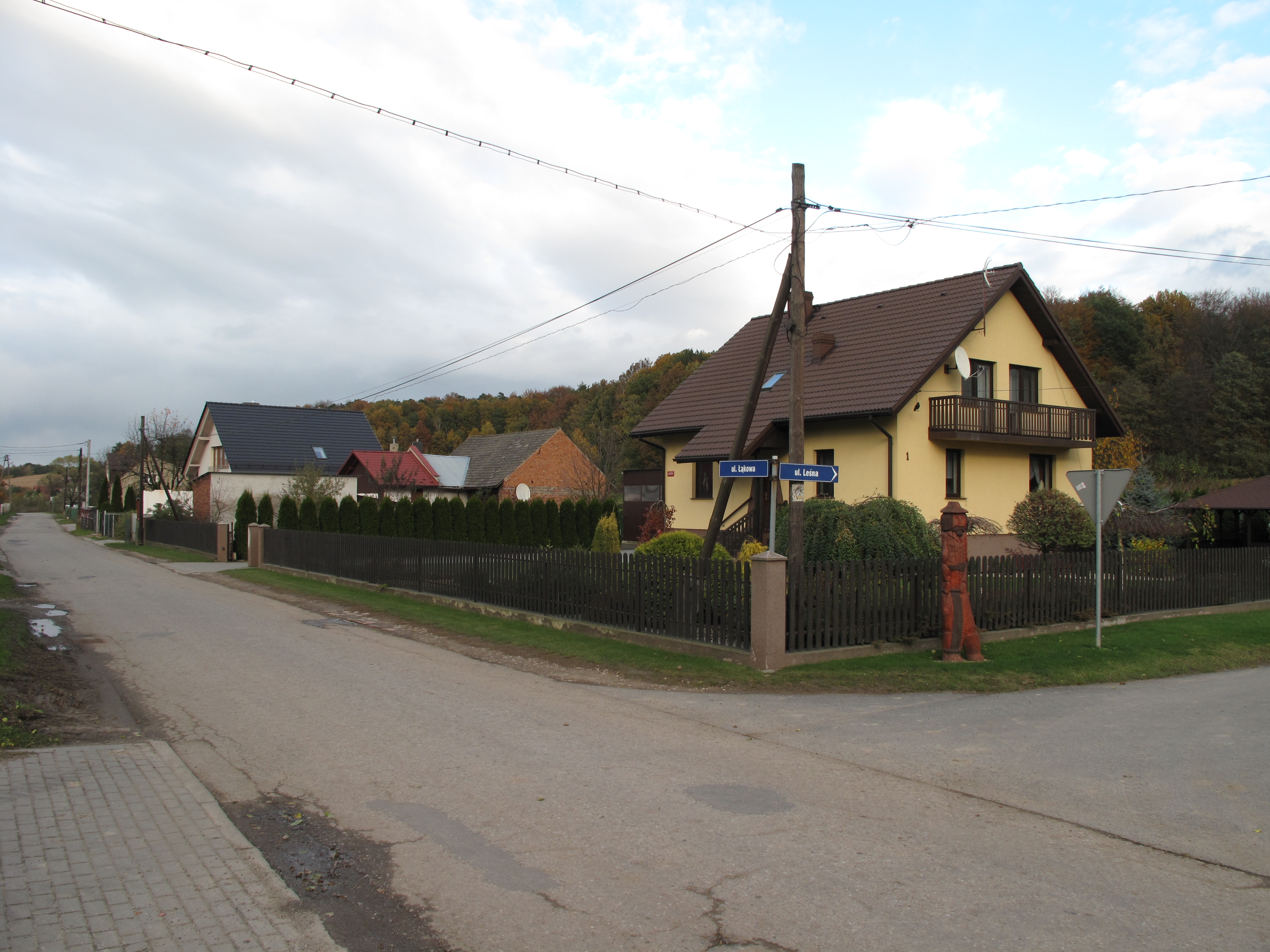
- Houses

- Location within Poland
- Coordinates: 50°10′33″N 18°9′42″E
- Country: Poland
- Voivodeship: Silesian
- County: Racibórz
- Gmina: Rudnik
- Population: 270

Ponięcice [pɔɲɛnˈt͡ɕit͡sɛ] is a village in the administrative district of Gmina Rudnik, within Racibórz County, Silesian Voivodeship, in southern Poland.

== Gallery ==
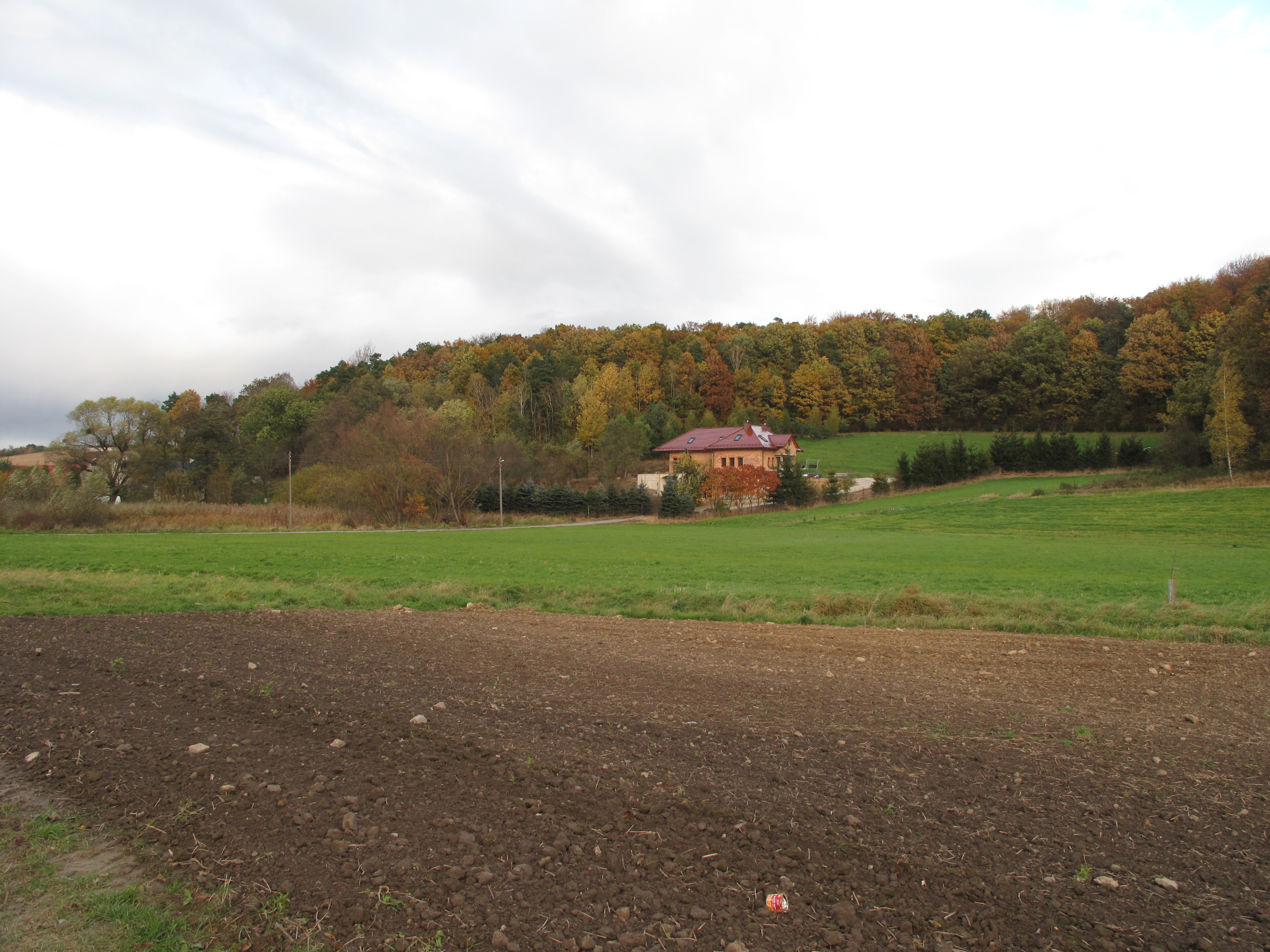
House

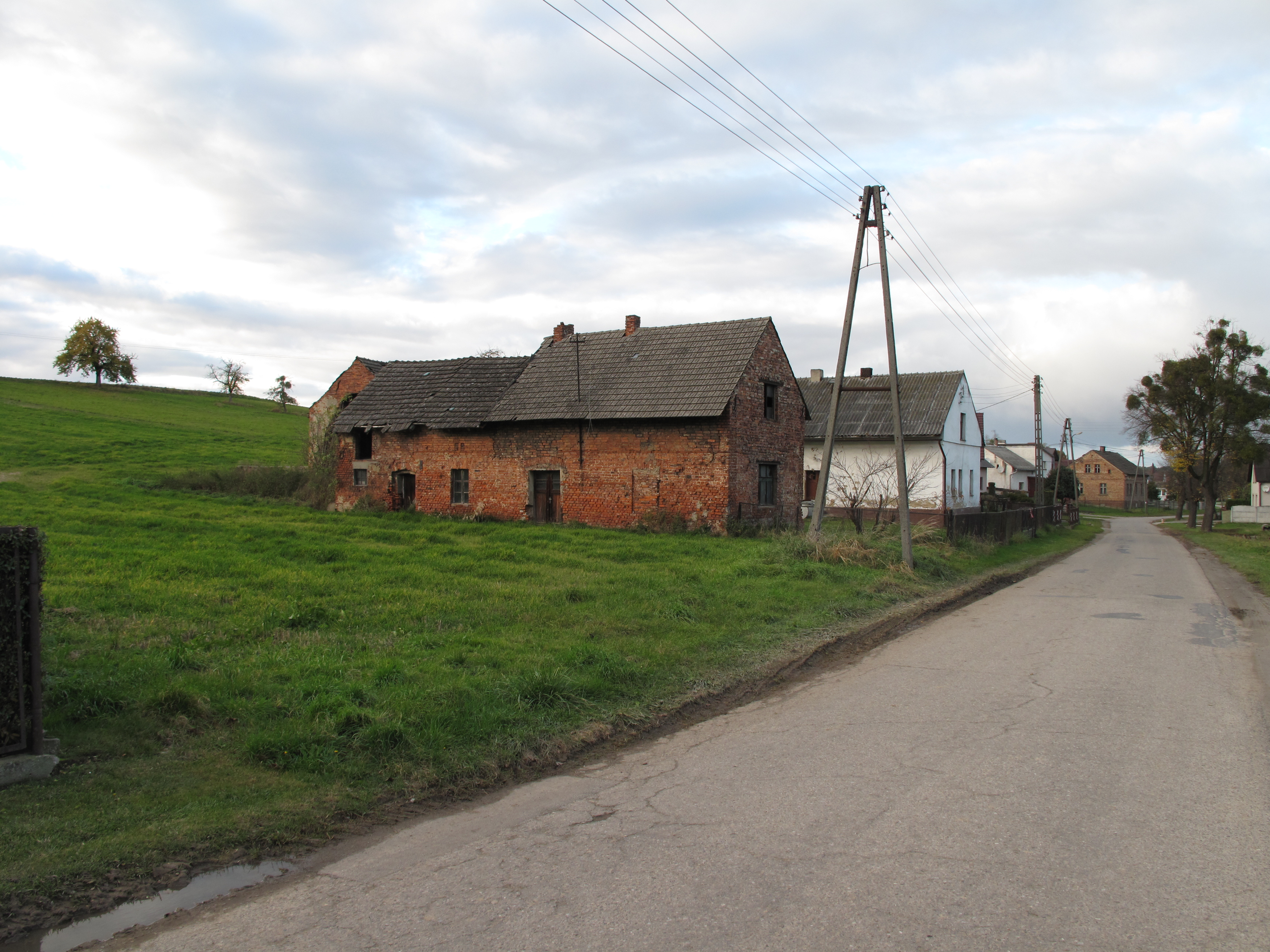
House

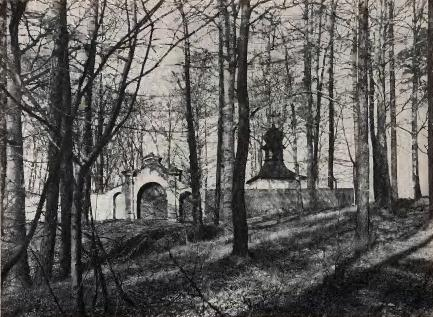
Cemetery (before 1935)
