= Dolędzin =

- Settlement
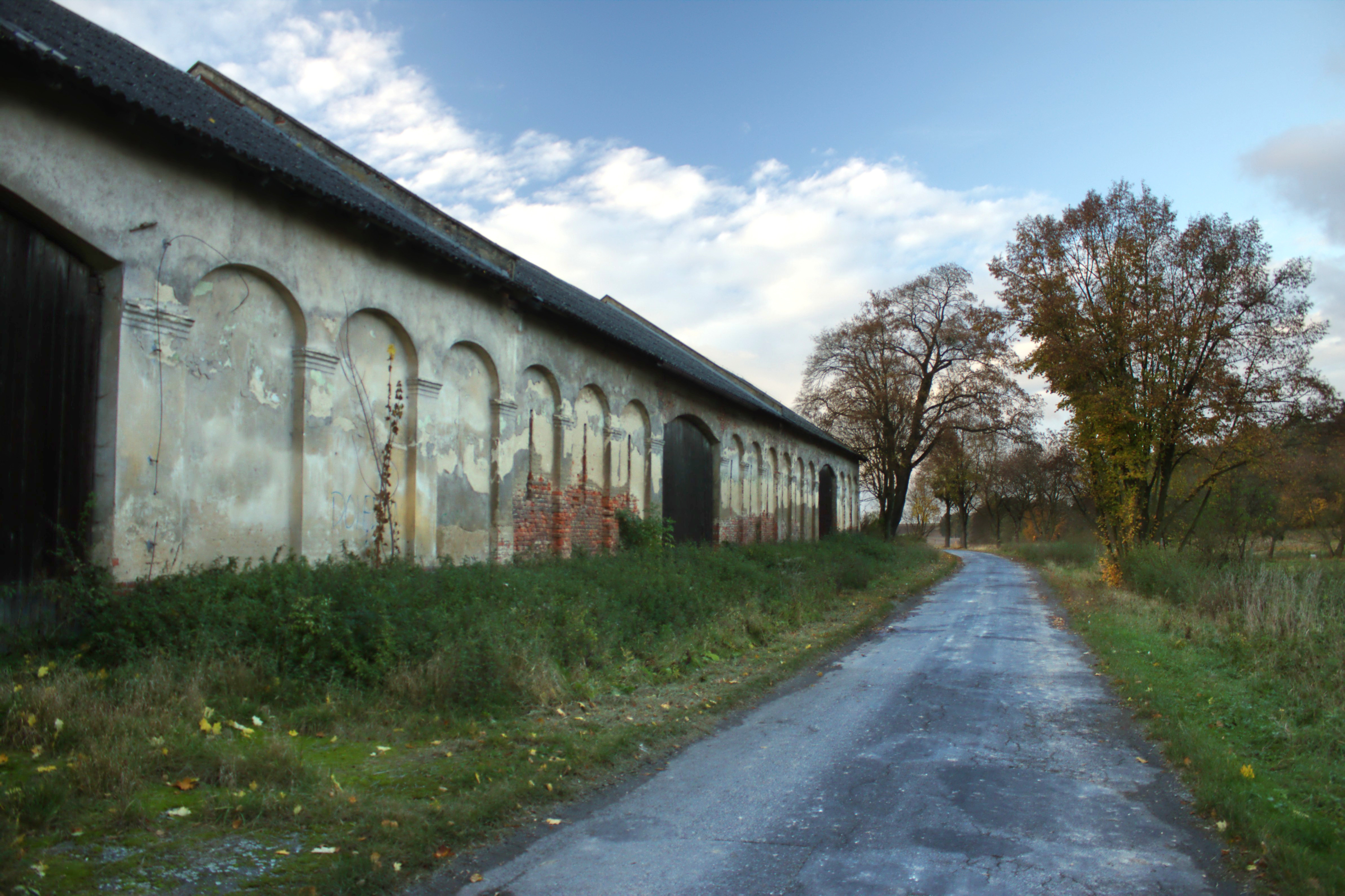
- Barns

- Location within Poland
- Coordinates: 50°10′21″N 18°8′7″E
- Country: Poland
- Voivodeship: Silesian
- County: Racibórz
- Gmina: Rudnik
- Population: 15

Dolędzin [dɔˈlɛnd͡ʑin] is a settlement in the administrative district of Gmina Rudnik, within Racibórz County, Silesian Voivodeship, in southern Poland.

== Gallery ==
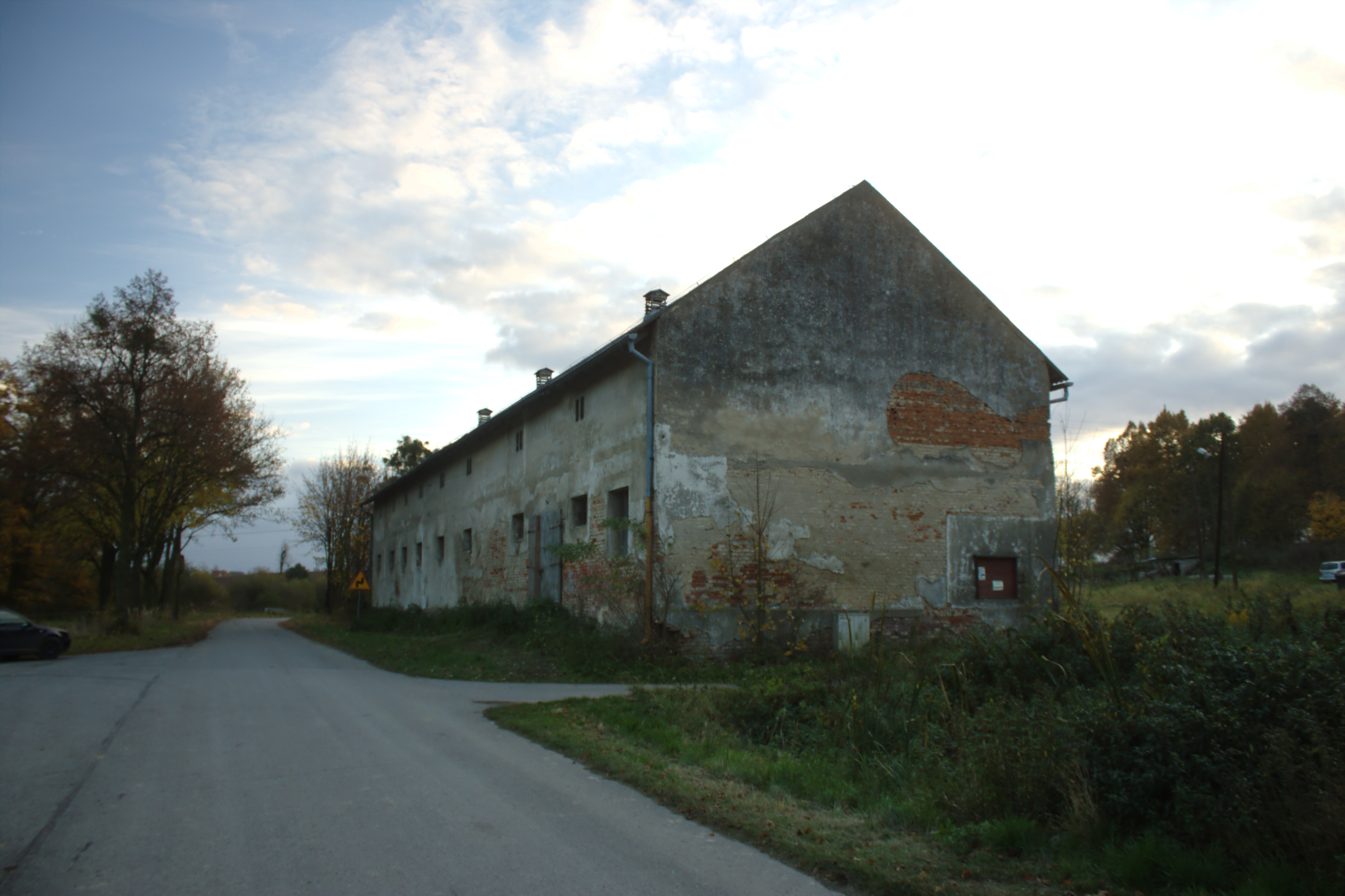
Former farm

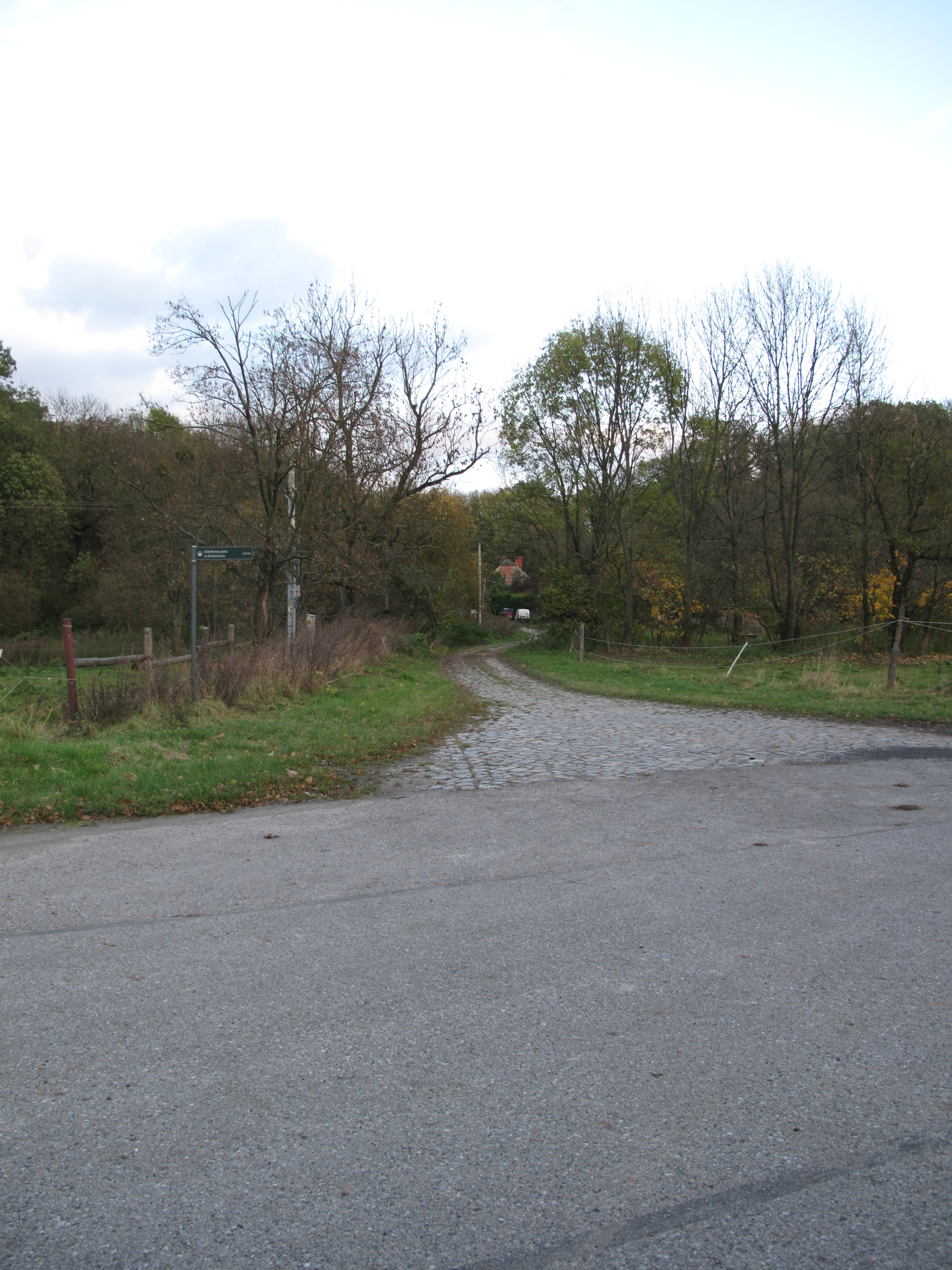
Road

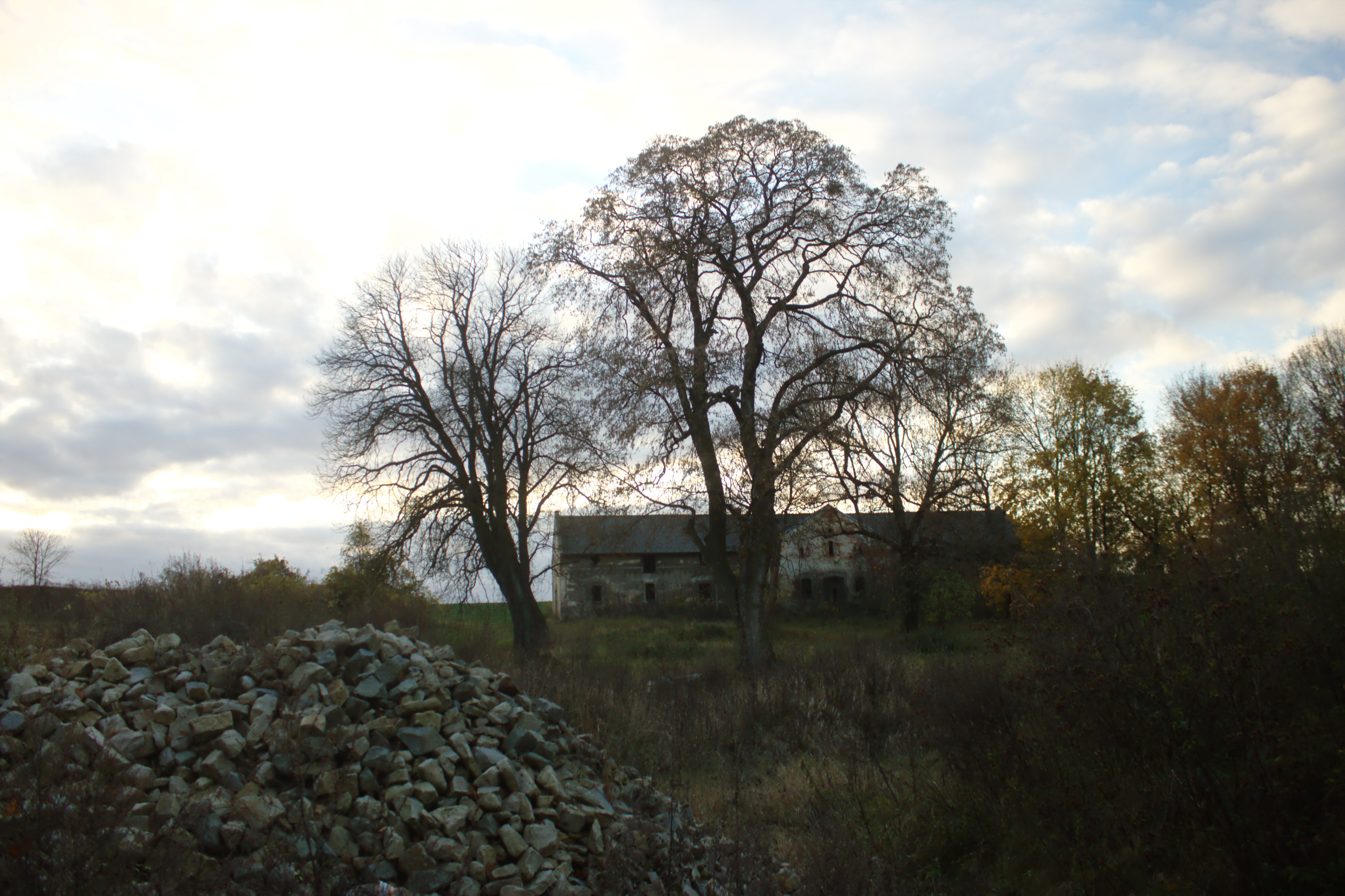
Former farm
