= Lasaki =

- Village
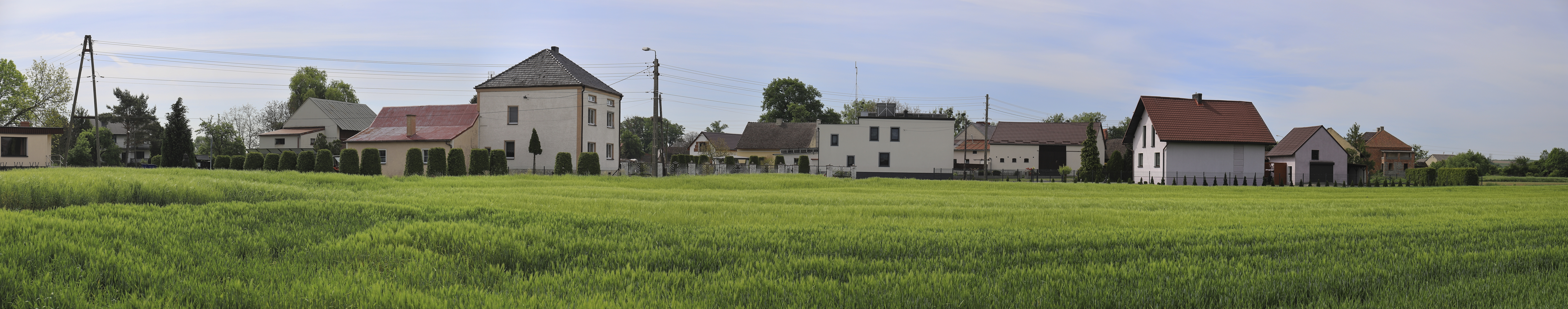
- Panorama (2024)

- Location within Poland
- Coordinates: 50°11′22″N 18°14′53″E
- Country: Poland
- Voivodeship: Silesian
- County: Racibórz
- Gmina: Rudnik
- Population: 220

Lasaki [laˈsaki] is a village in the administrative district of Gmina Rudnik, within Racibórz County, Silesian Voivodeship, in southern Poland.

The name of the village probably originates from the word Lasok, which referred to the workers of the forest. For the first time mentioned in the fifteenth century as a hamlet Sławikowa Sławikowski called Upper Las.

== Gallery ==
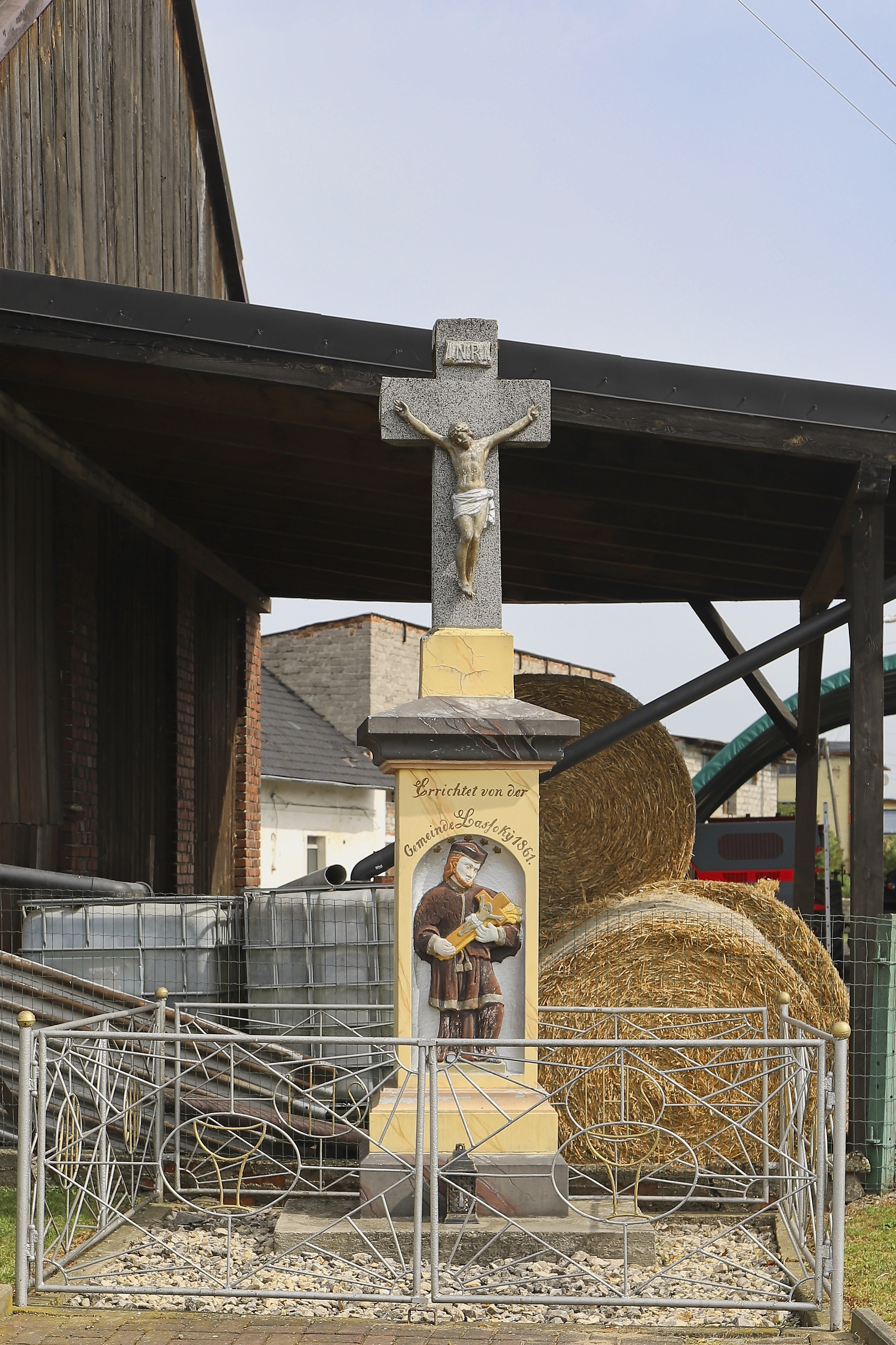
Wayside cross

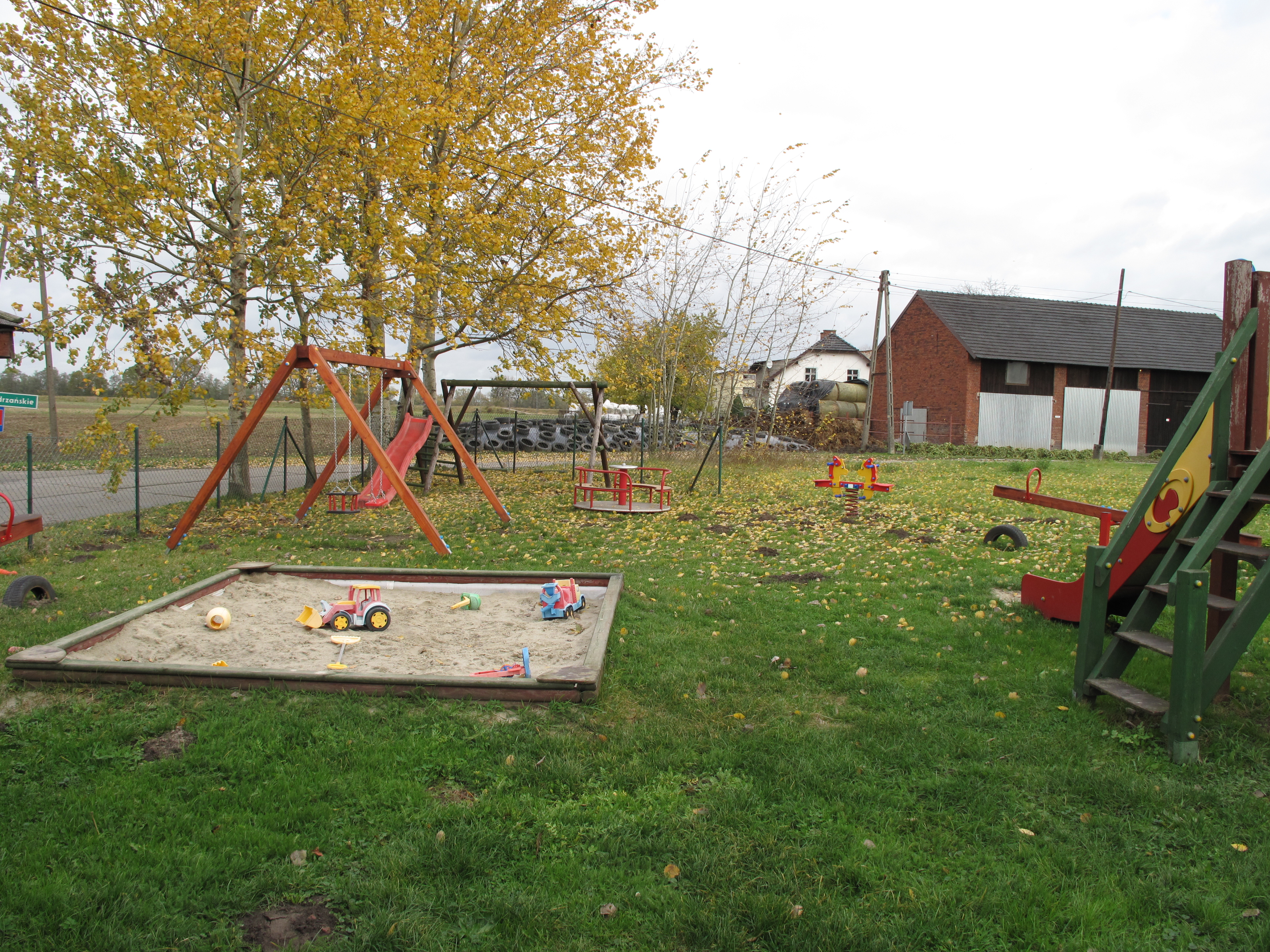
Playground

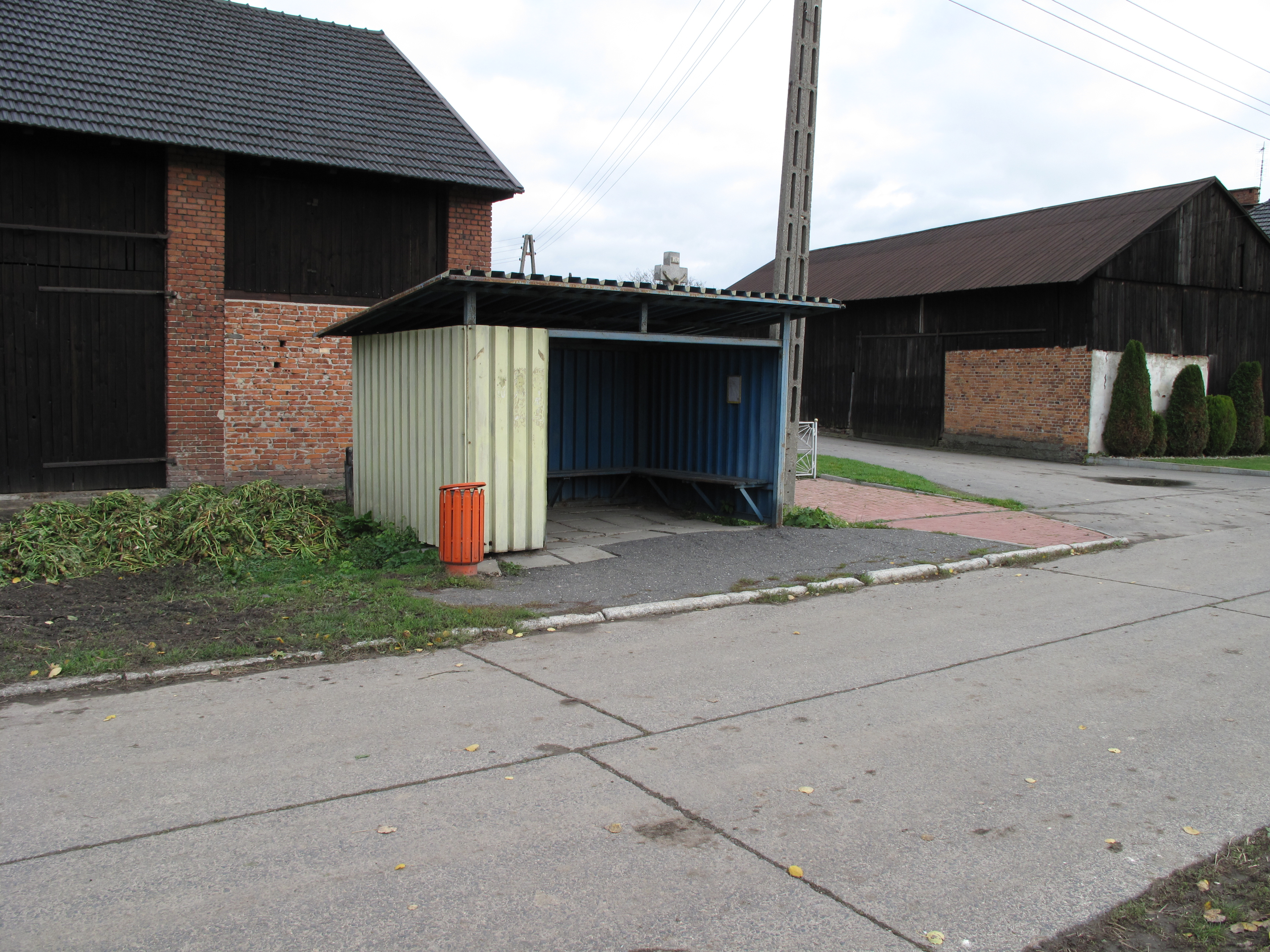
Bus stop
