= Jastrzębie, Silesian Voivodeship =

Jastrzębie
- Village
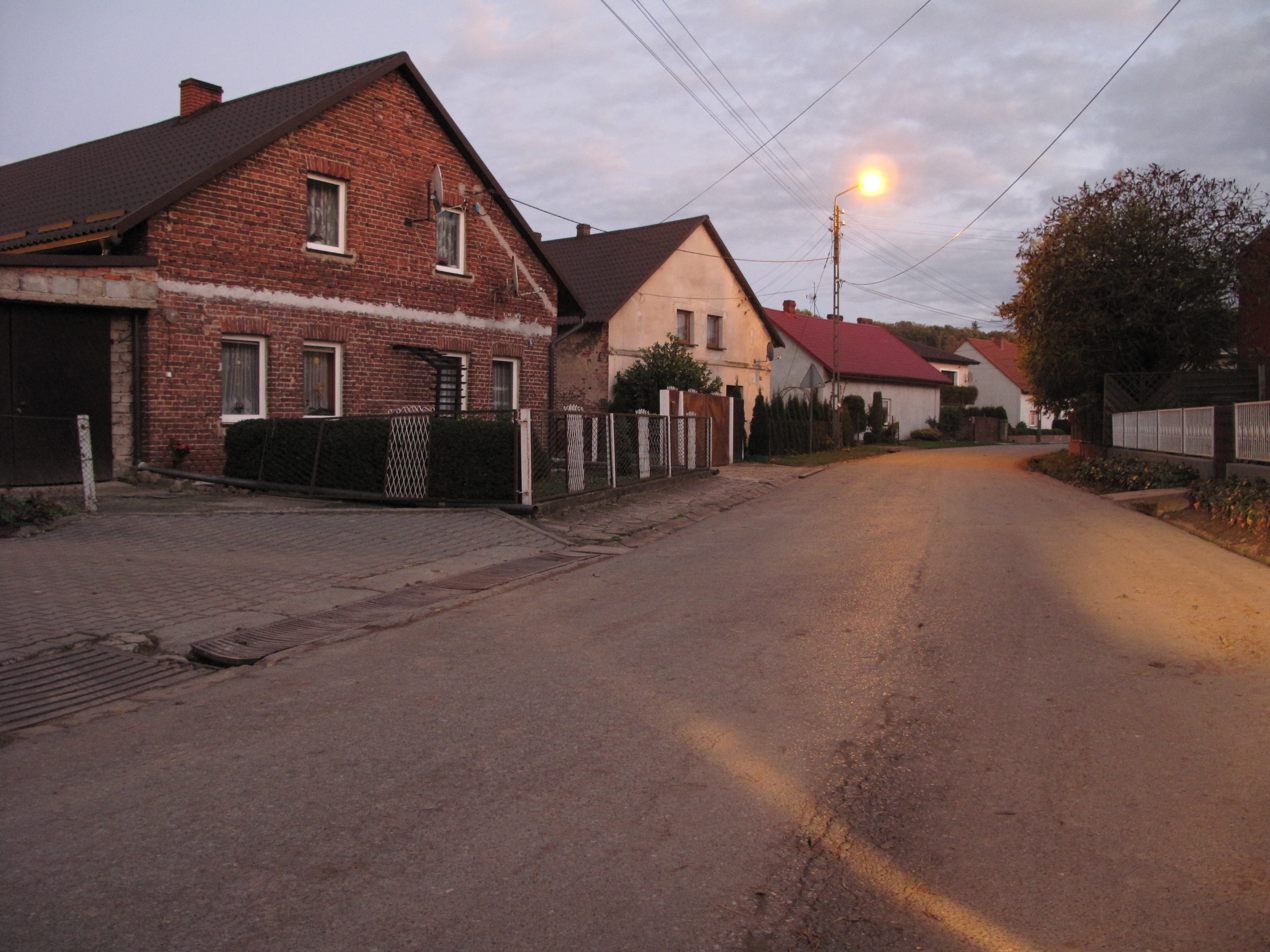
- Houses

- Location within Poland
- Coordinates: 50°10′15″N 18°6′0″E
- Country: Poland
- Voivodeship: Silesian
- County: Racibórz
- Gmina: Rudnik
- Population: 170

Jastrzębie [jasˈtʂɛmbjɛ] is a village in the administrative district of Gmina Rudnik, within Racibórz County, Silesian Voivodeship, in southern Poland.

== Gallery ==
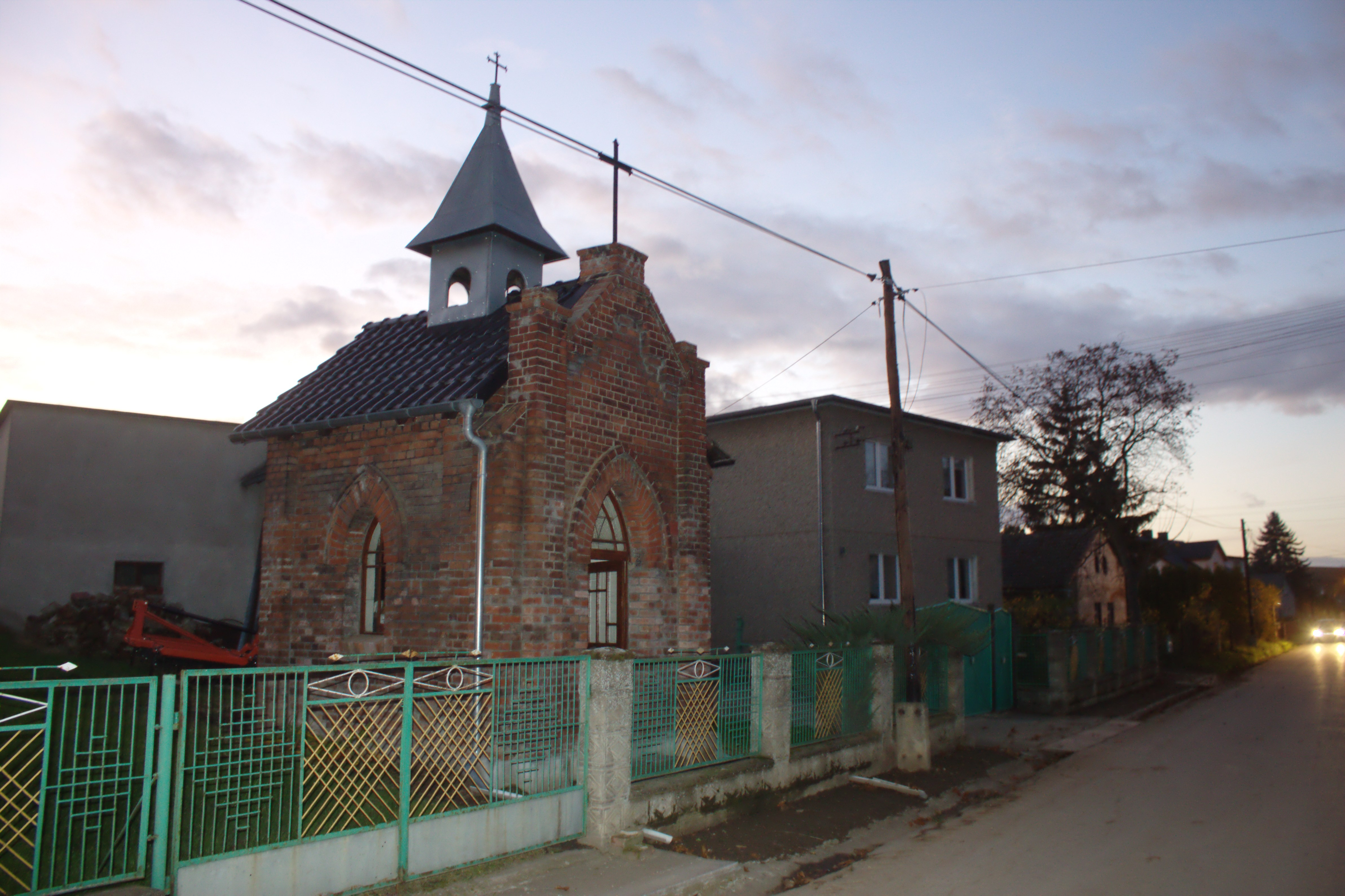
Village chapell

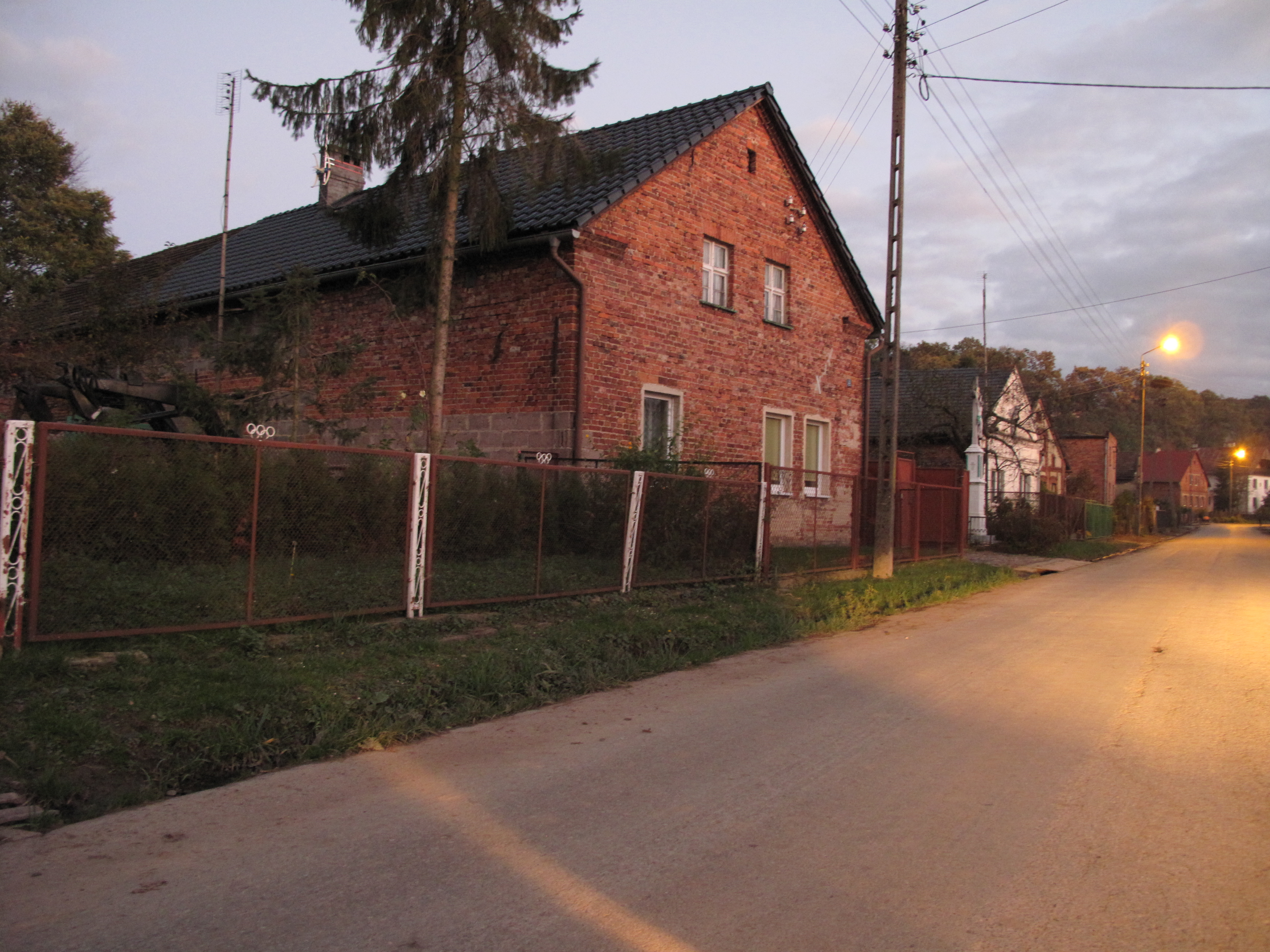
Street

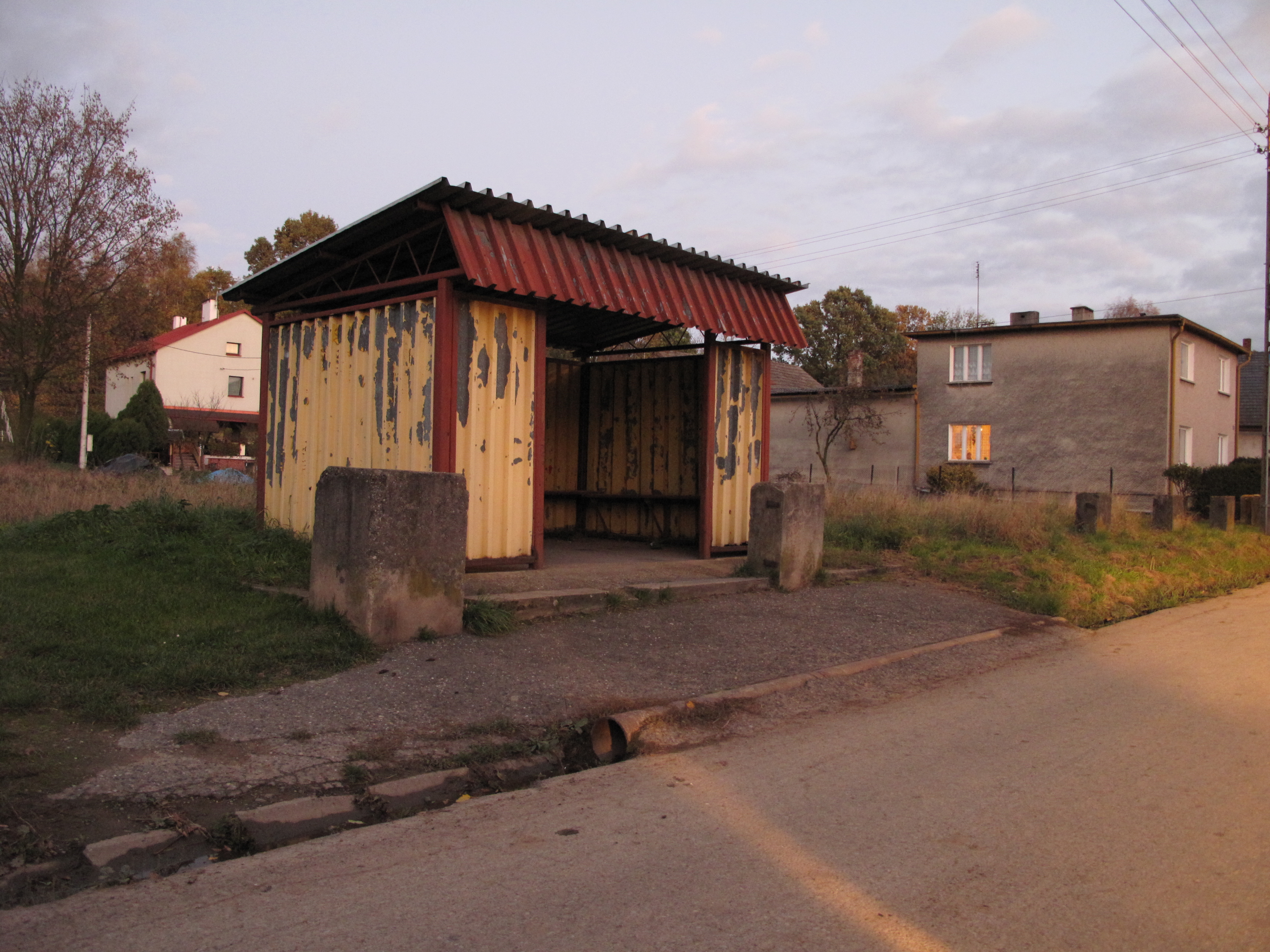
Bus stop shed
