= Grzegorzowice, Silesian Voivodeship =

Grzegorzowice
- Village
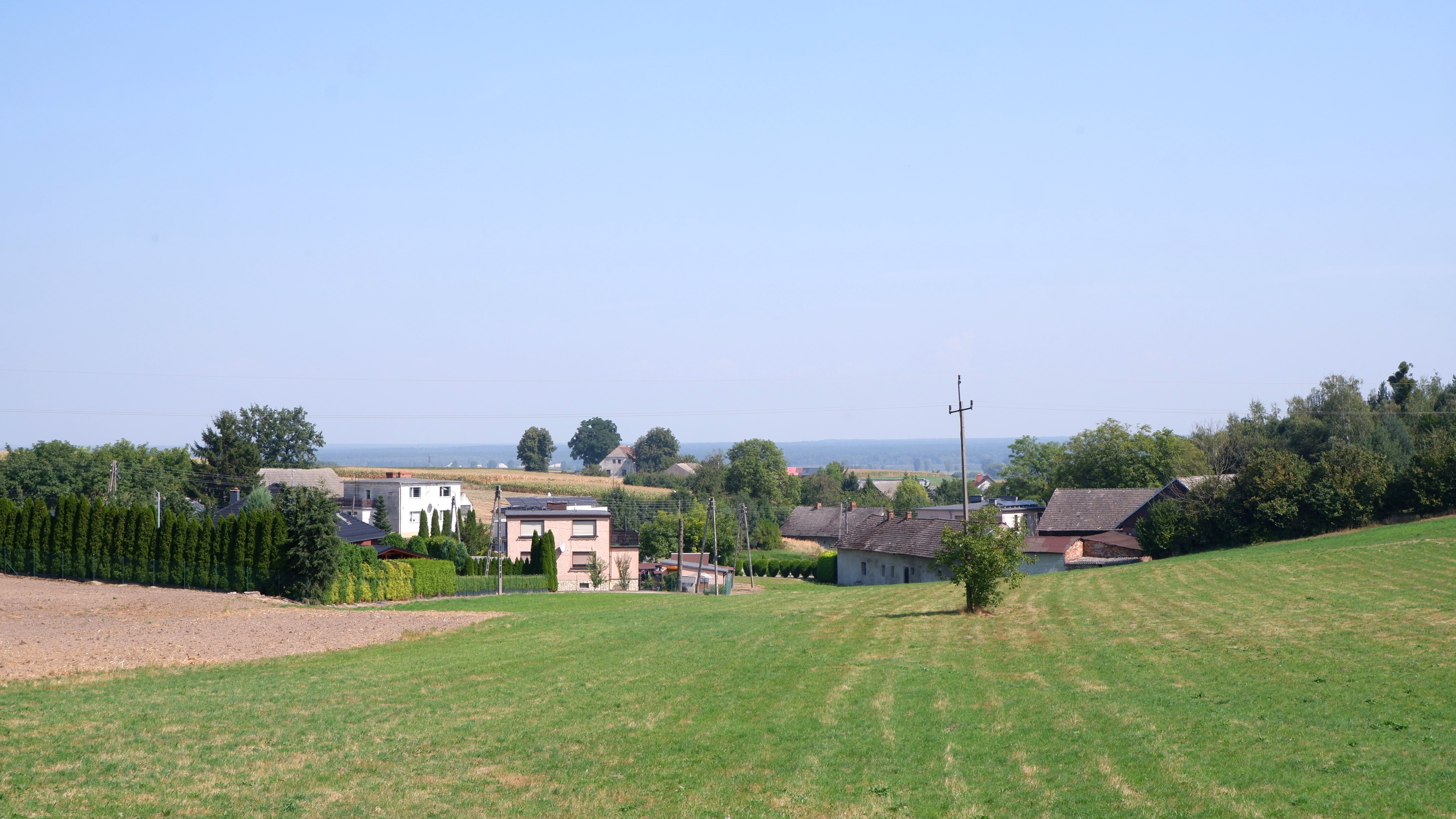
- General view of the village

- Location within Poland
- Coordinates: 50°10′12″N 18°14′28″E
- Country: Poland
- Voivodeship: Silesian
- County: Racibórz
- Gmina: Rudnik
- Population: 690

Grzegorzowice [ɡʐɛɡɔʐɔˈvit͡sɛ] is a village in the administrative district of Gmina Rudnik, within Racibórz County, Silesian Voivodeship, in southern Poland.
