= Strzybniczek =

- Village
- Location within Poland
- Coordinates: 50°7′18″N 18°9′15″E
- Country: Poland
- Voivodeship: Silesian
- County: Racibórz
- Gmina: Rudnik

Strzybniczek [stʂɨbˈnit͡ʂɛk] is a village in the administrative district of Gmina Rudnik, within Racibórz County, Silesian Voivodeship, in southern Poland.
