= Kolonia Strzybnik =

- Village
- Location within Poland
- Coordinates: 50°8′47″N 18°8′33″E
- Country: Poland
- Voivodeship: Silesian
- County: Racibórz
- Gmina: Rudnik

Kolonia Strzybnik [kɔˈlɔɲa ˈstʂɨbnik] is a village in the administrative district of Gmina Rudnik, within Racibórz County, Silesian Voivodeship, in southern Poland.
