= Sławienko, Silesian Voivodeship =

Sławienko
- Village
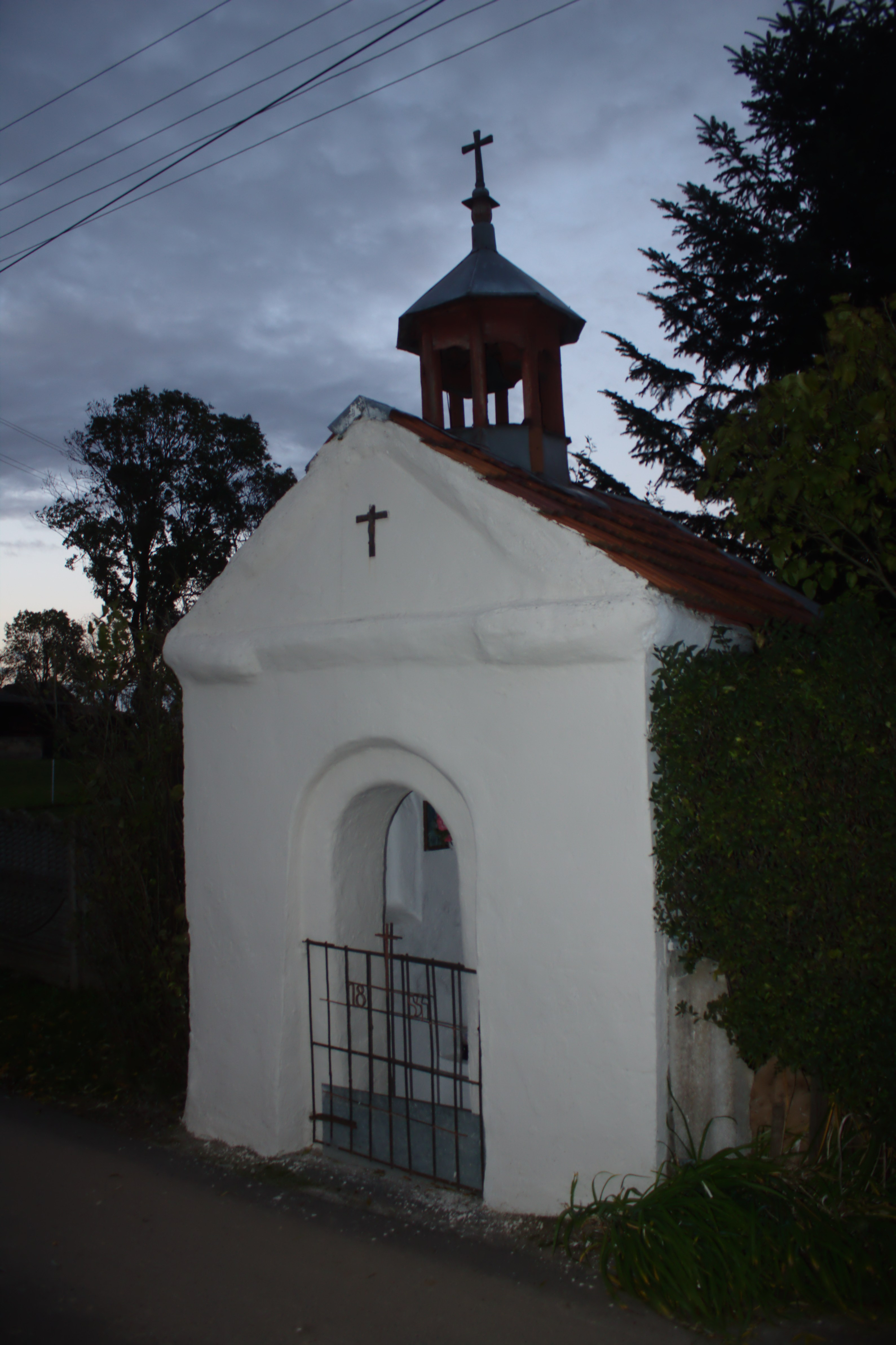
- Village chapell

- Location within Poland
- Coordinates: 50°8′56″N 18°6′29″E
- Country: Poland
- Voivodeship: Silesian
- County: Racibórz
- Gmina: Rudnik

Sławienko [swaˈvjɛnkɔ] (German Ehrenfeld) is a village in the administrative district of Gmina Rudnik, within Racibórz County, Silesian Voivodeship, in southern Poland.

== Gallery ==
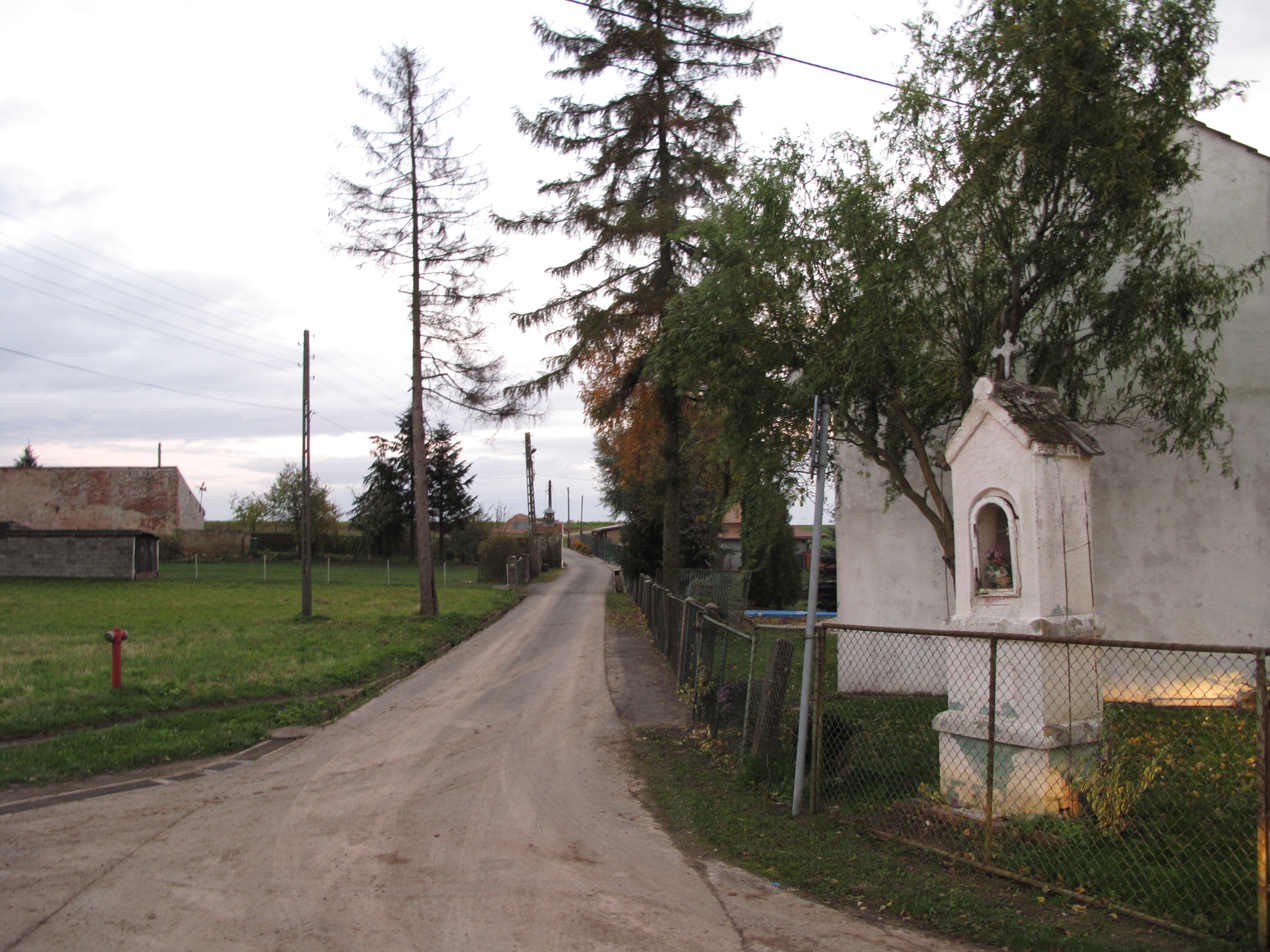
Street

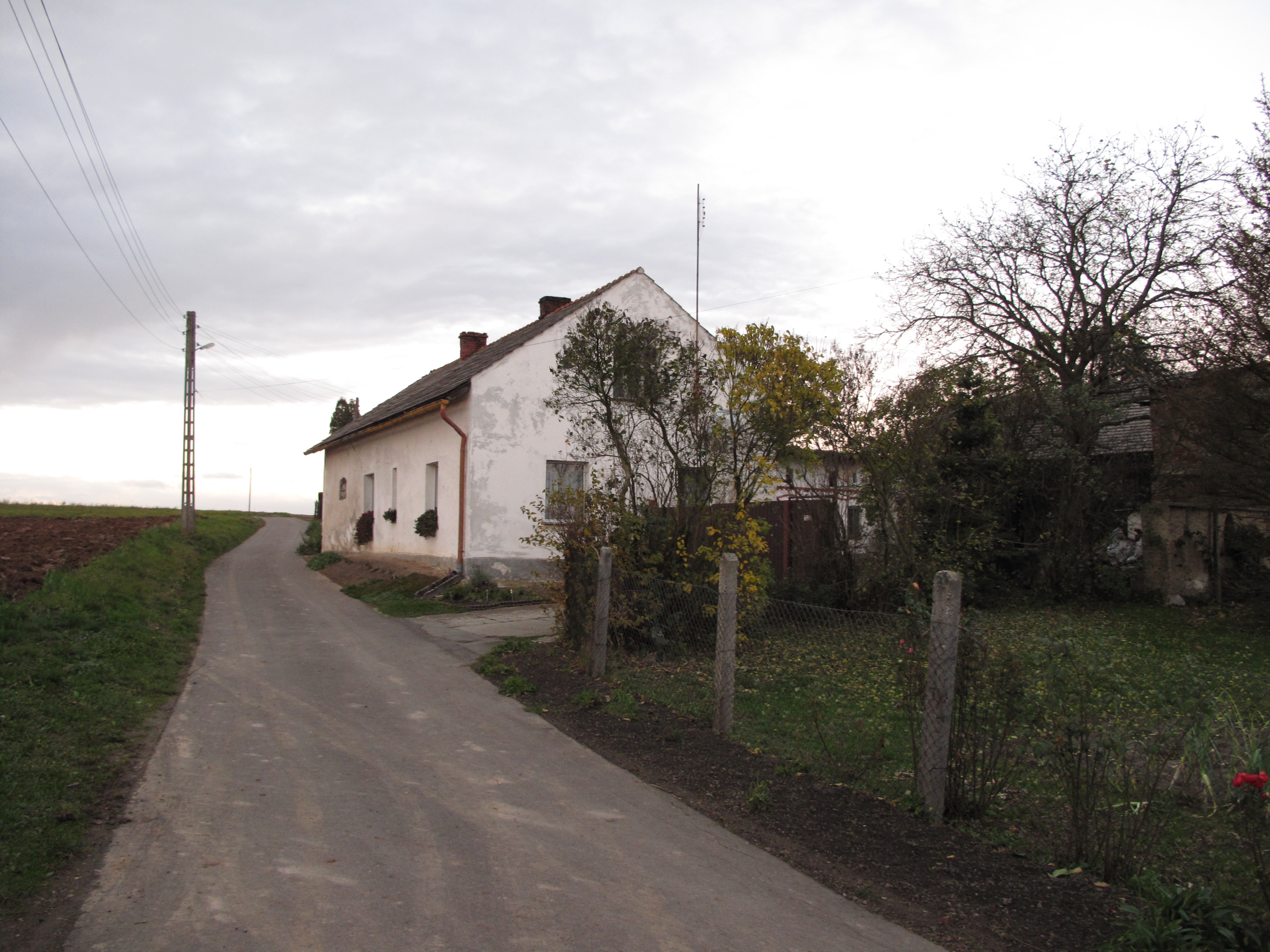
House

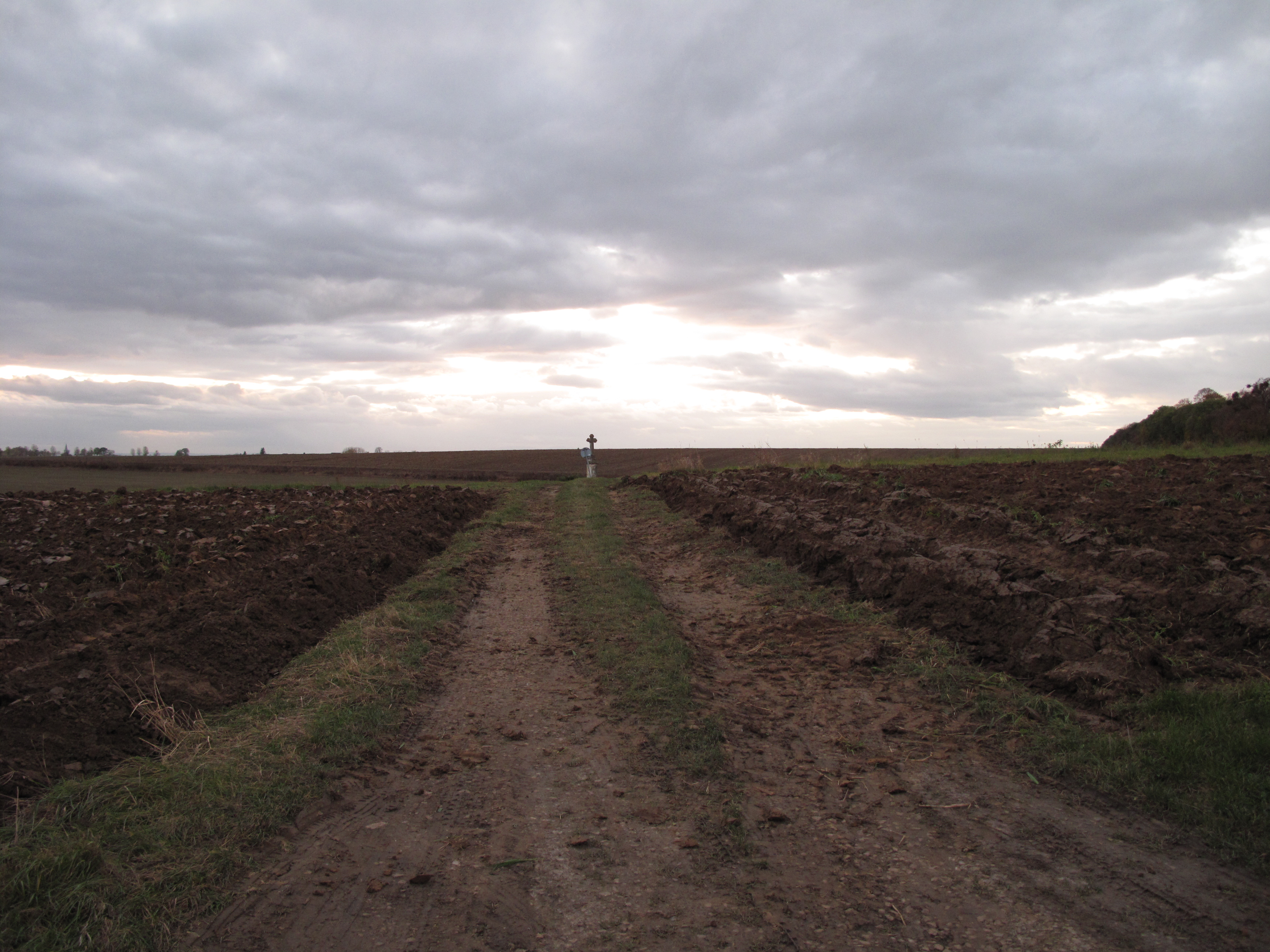
Fields
