= Gamov =

Gamov or Gamow (Russian: Гамов) is a Russian masculine surname originating from the word gam, meaning noise, shouting, its feminine counterpart is Gamova or Gamowa. It may refer to:

- Dmitry Gamov (1834–1903), Russian explorer
- George Gamow (1904–1968), Russian-born physicist and cosmologist
- Igor Gamow (1935–2021), American inventor, son of George Gamow
- Vitaly Gamov (1962–2002), Russian Border Guard Official
- Yekaterina Gamova (born 1980), Russian volleyball player
