= Ligota Książęca, Silesian Voivodeship =

Ligota Książęca
- Village
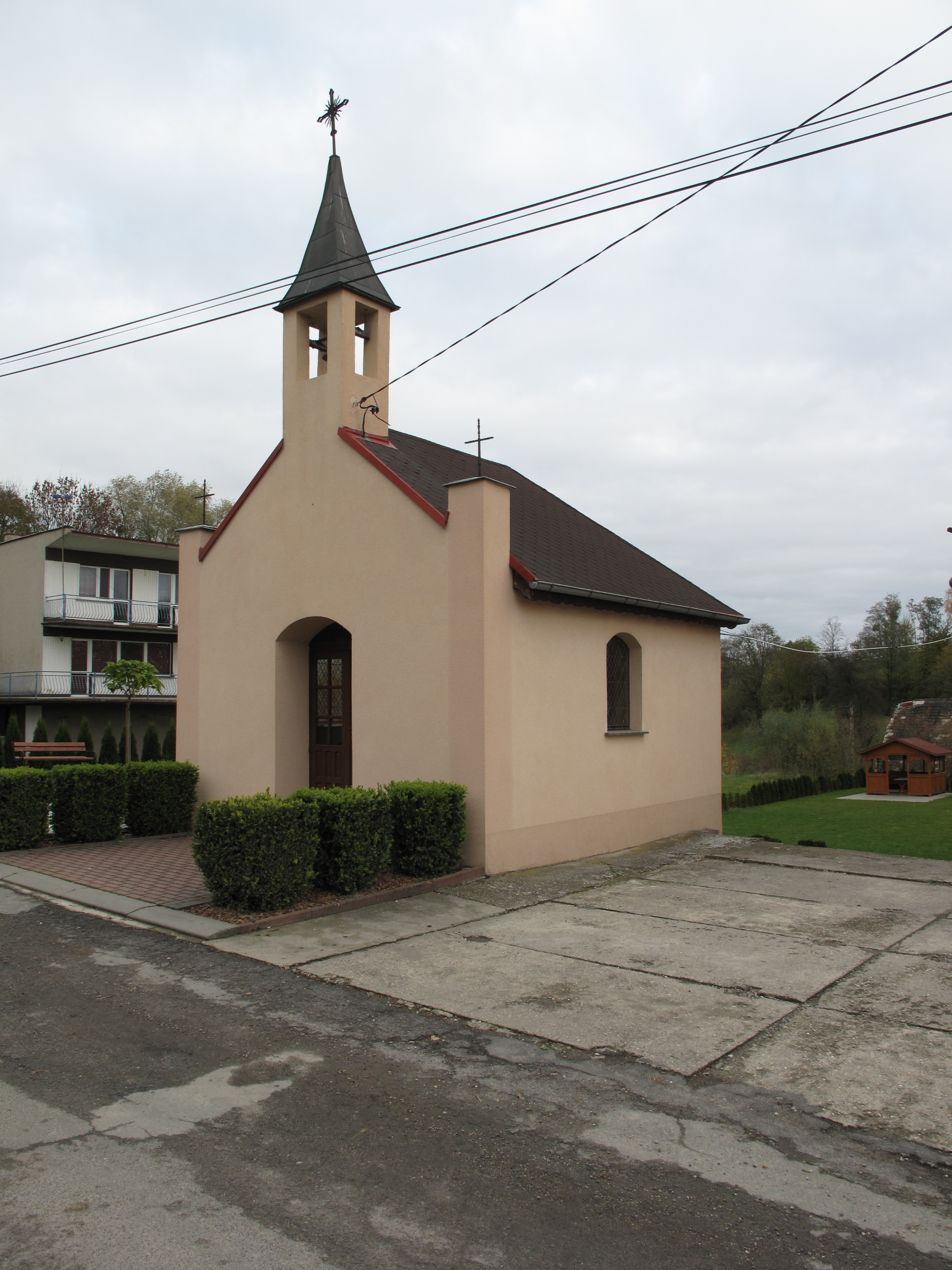
- Village chapel

- Location within Poland
- Coordinates: 50°9′15″N 18°13′48″E
- Country: Poland
- Voivodeship: Silesian
- County: Racibórz
- Gmina: Rudnik
- Population: 160

Ligota Książęca [liˈɡɔta kɕɔ̃ˈʐɛnt͡sa] is a village in the administrative district of Gmina Rudnik, within Racibórz County, Silesian Voivodeship, in southern Poland.

== Gallery ==
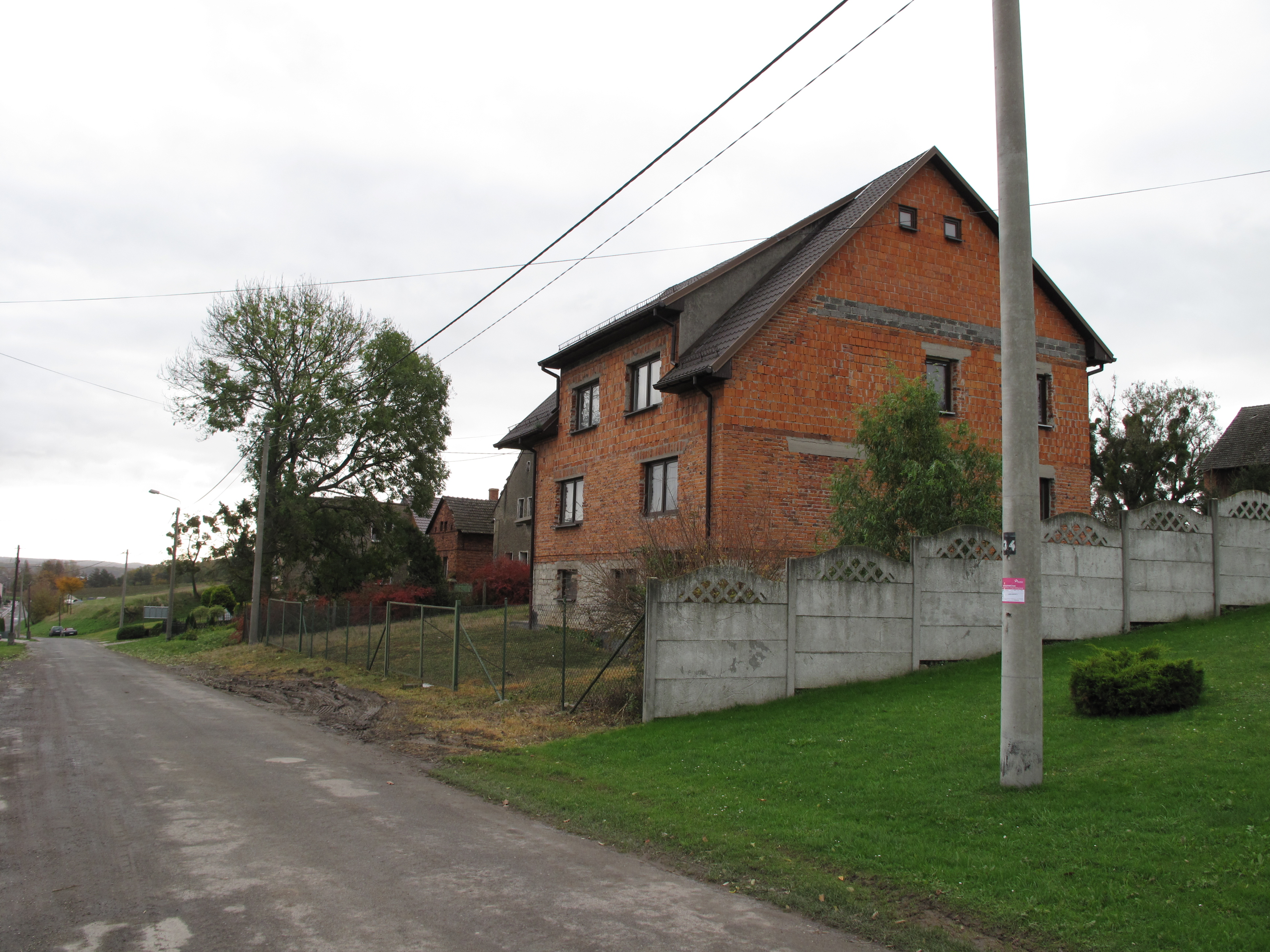
Brick house

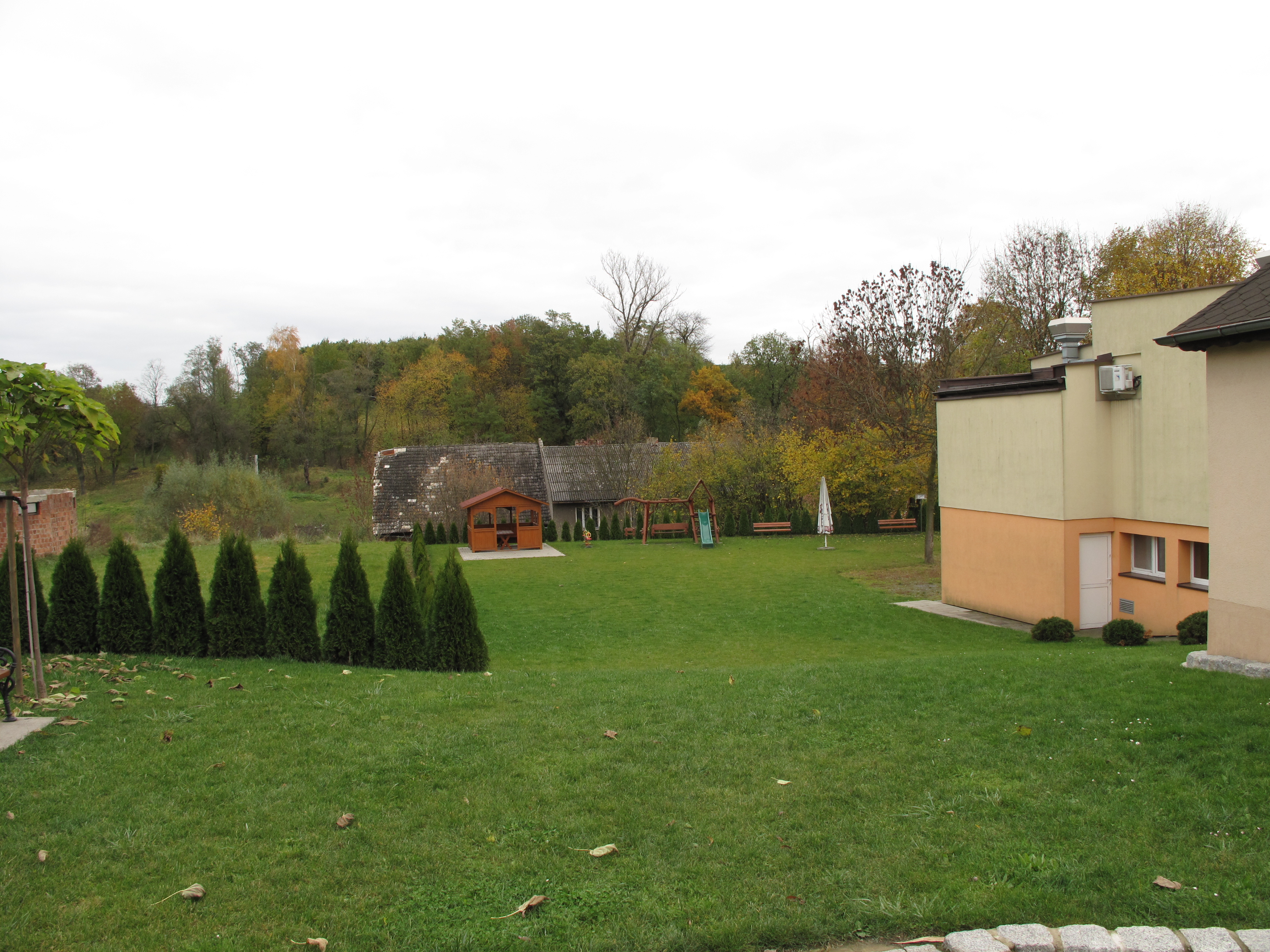
Playground

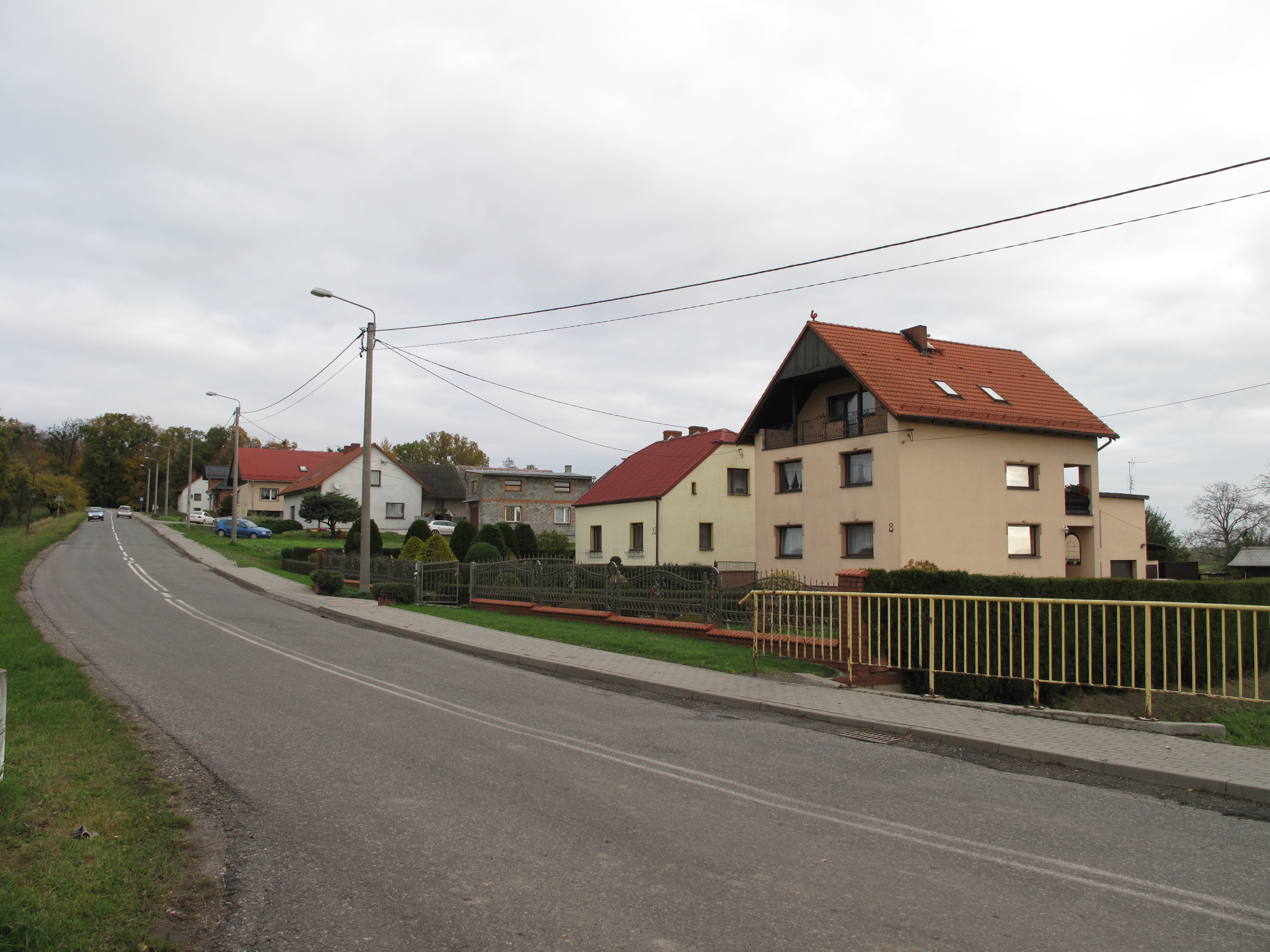
Houses by the main road
