= Szonowice =

- Village
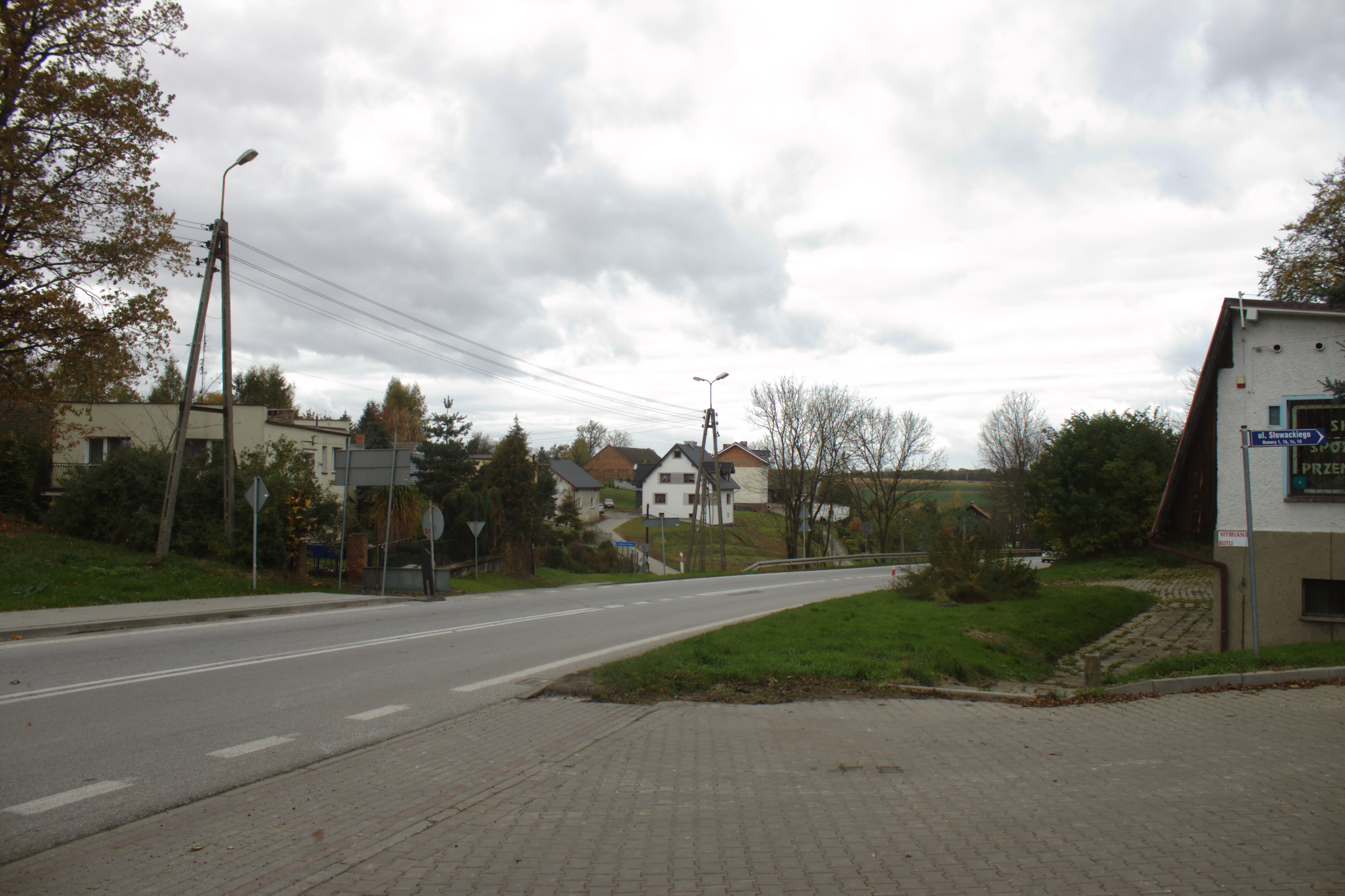
- Main road

- Location within Poland
- Coordinates: 50°9′35″N 18°9′13″E
- Country: Poland
- Voivodeship: Silesian
- County: Racibórz
- Gmina: Rudnik
- Population: 280

Szonowice [ʂɔnɔˈvit͡sɛ] is a village in the administrative district of Gmina Rudnik, within Racibórz County, Silesian Voivodeship, in southern Poland.

== Gallery ==
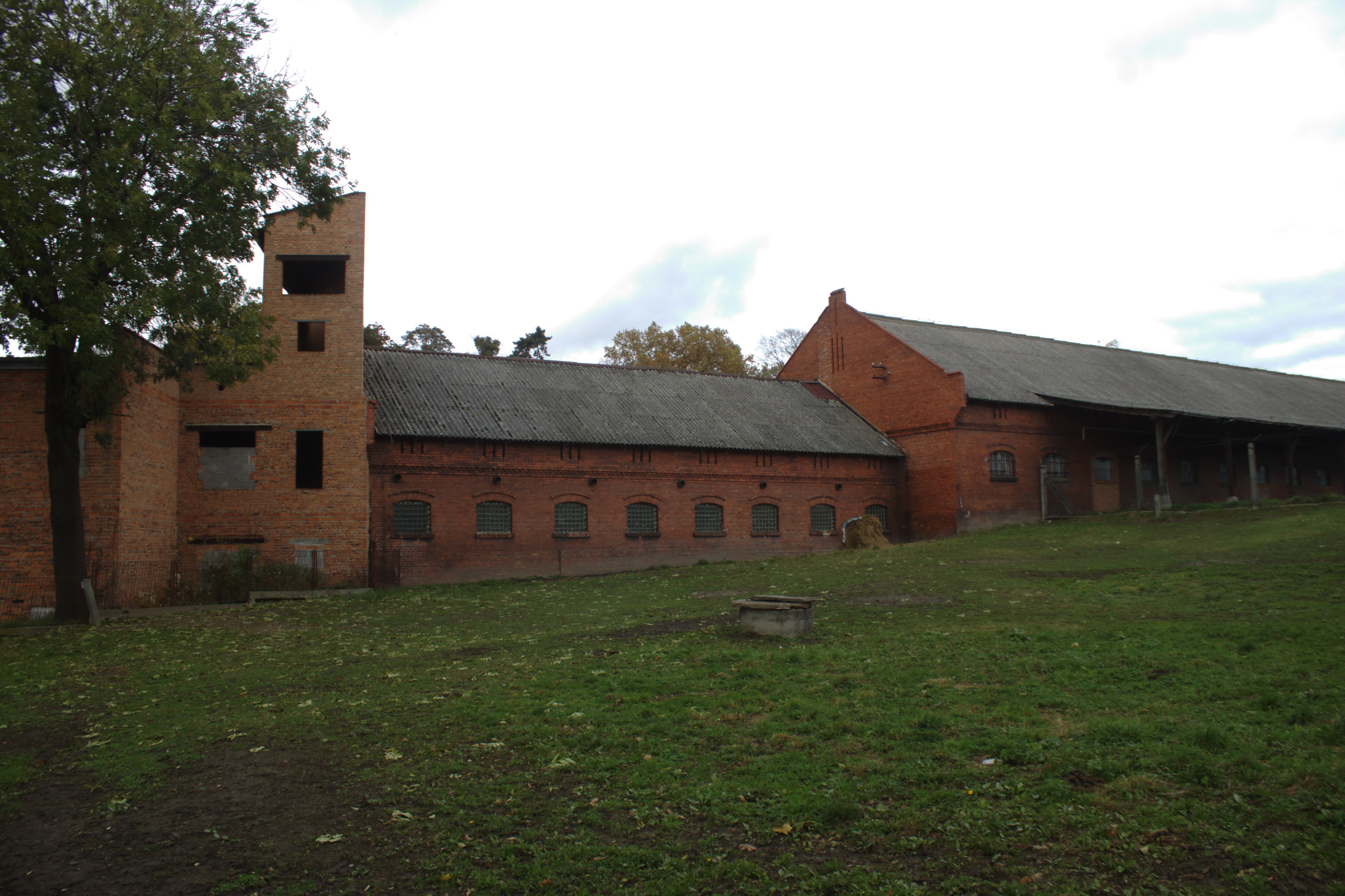
Factory

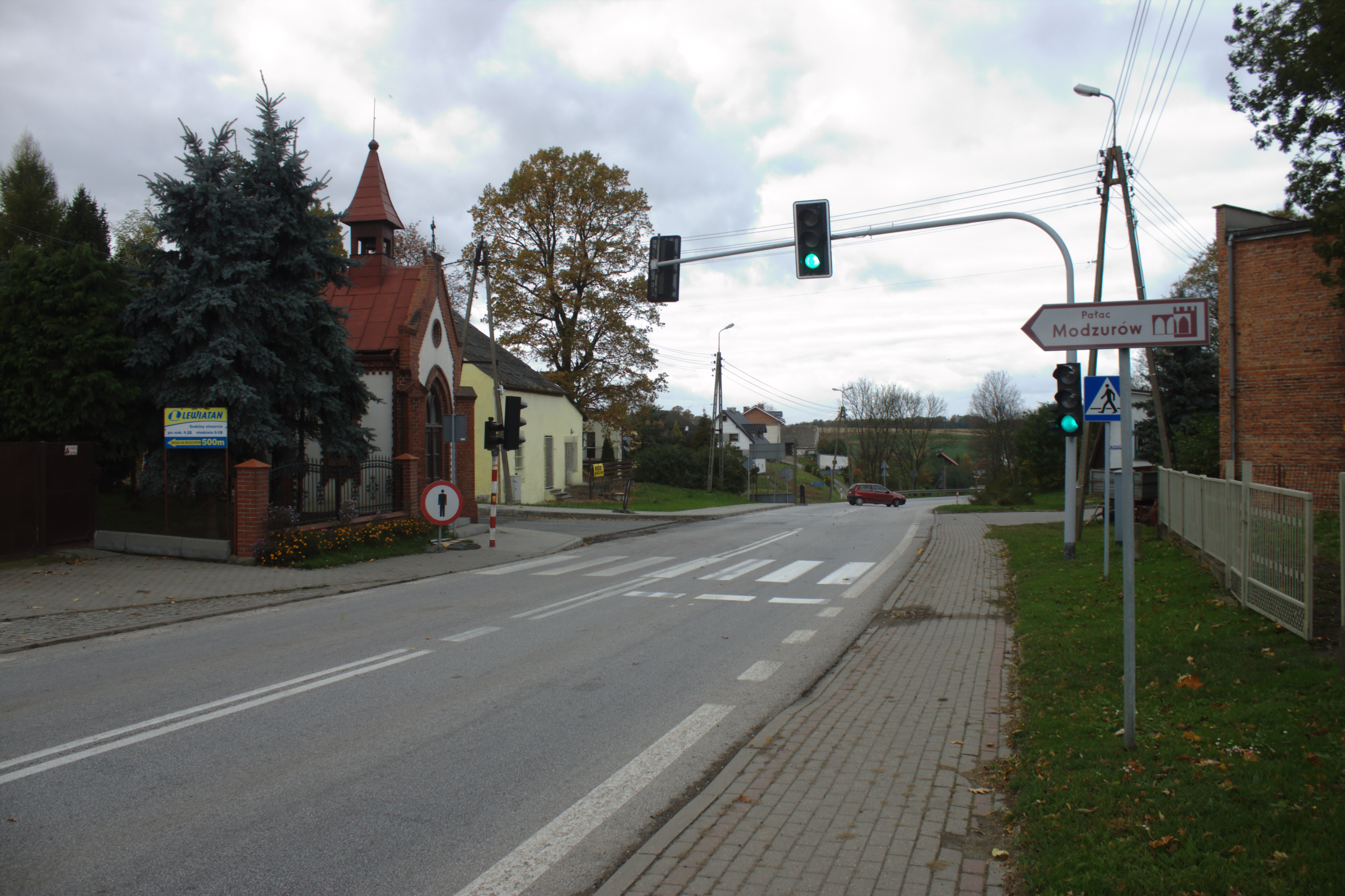

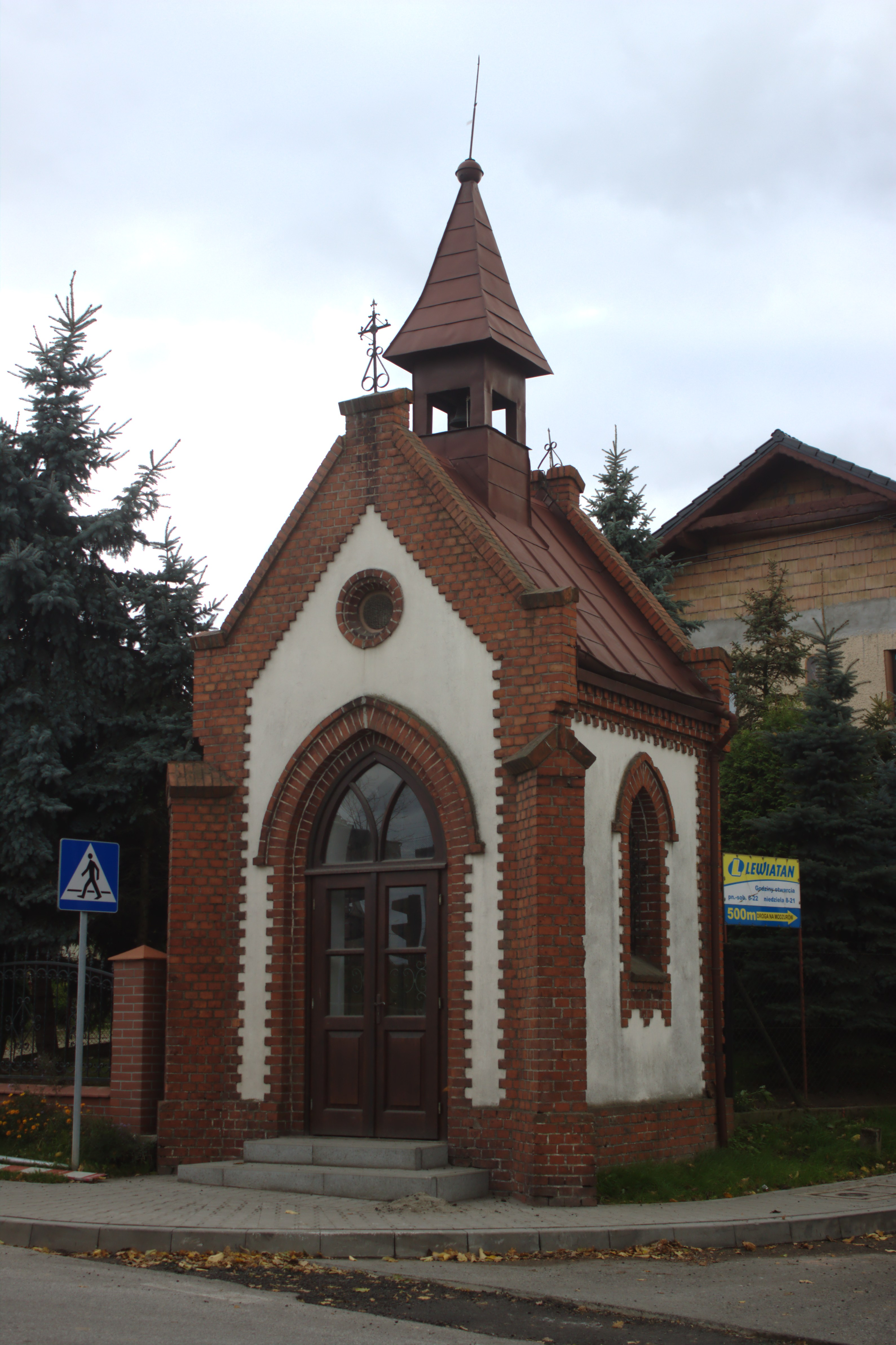
Village chapell
