= Gmina Rudnik, Silesian Voivodeship =

Gmina Rudnik Rudnik Commune
- Gmina
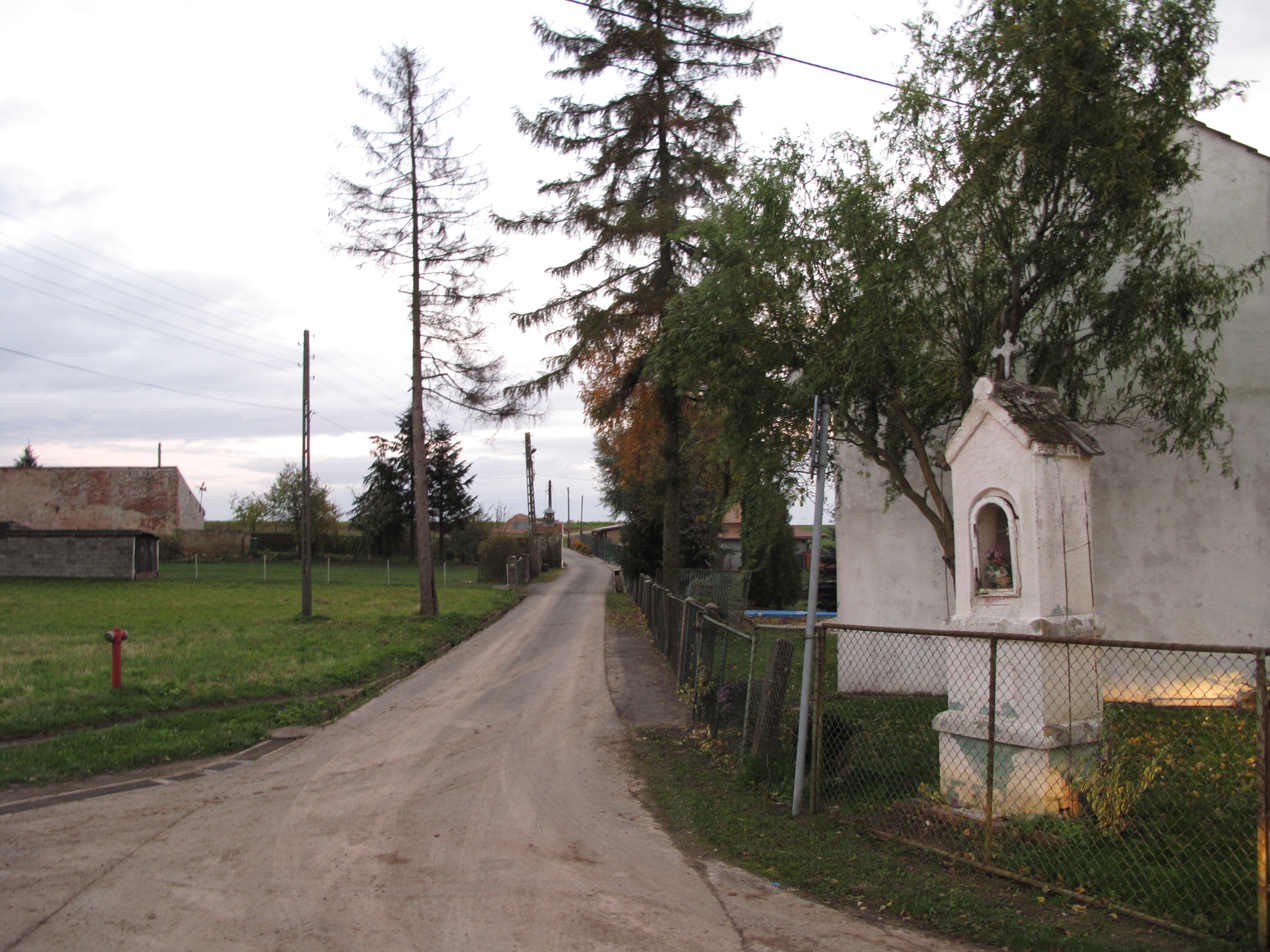
- Road in Sławienko

- Coat of arms
- Interactive map of Gmina Rudnik
- Coordinates (Rudnik): 50°7′42″N 18°11′0″E
- Country: Poland
- Voivodeship: Silesian
- County: Racibórz
- Seat: Rudnik

Area
  - Total: 73.94 km^{2} (28.55 sq mi)

Population (2019-06-30)
  - Total: 5,188
  - Density: 70.16/km^{2} (181.7/sq mi)
- Website: https://gmina-rudnik.pl/

Gmina Rudnik is a rural gmina (administrative district) in Racibórz County, Silesian Voivodeship, in southern Poland. Its seat is the village of Rudnik, which lies approximately 7 kilometres (4 mi) north-west of Racibórz and 60 km (37 mi) west of the regional capital Katowice.

The gmina covers an area of 73.94 square kilometres (28.5 sq mi), and as of 2019, its total population was 5,188.

== Villages ==
Gmina Rudnik contains the villages and settlements of Brzeźnica, Czerwięcice, Dolędzin, Gacki, Gamów, Grzegorzowice, Jastrzębie, Kolonia Strzybnik, Lasaki, Ligota Książęca, Łubowice, Modzurów, Ponięcice, Rudnik, Sławienko, Sławików, Strzybniczek, Strzybnik and Szonowice.

== Neighbouring gminas ==
Gmina Rudnik is bordered by the town of Racibórz and by the gminas of Baborów, Cisek, Kuźnia Raciborska, Nędza, Pietrowice Wielkie and Polska Cerekiew.

== Gallery ==
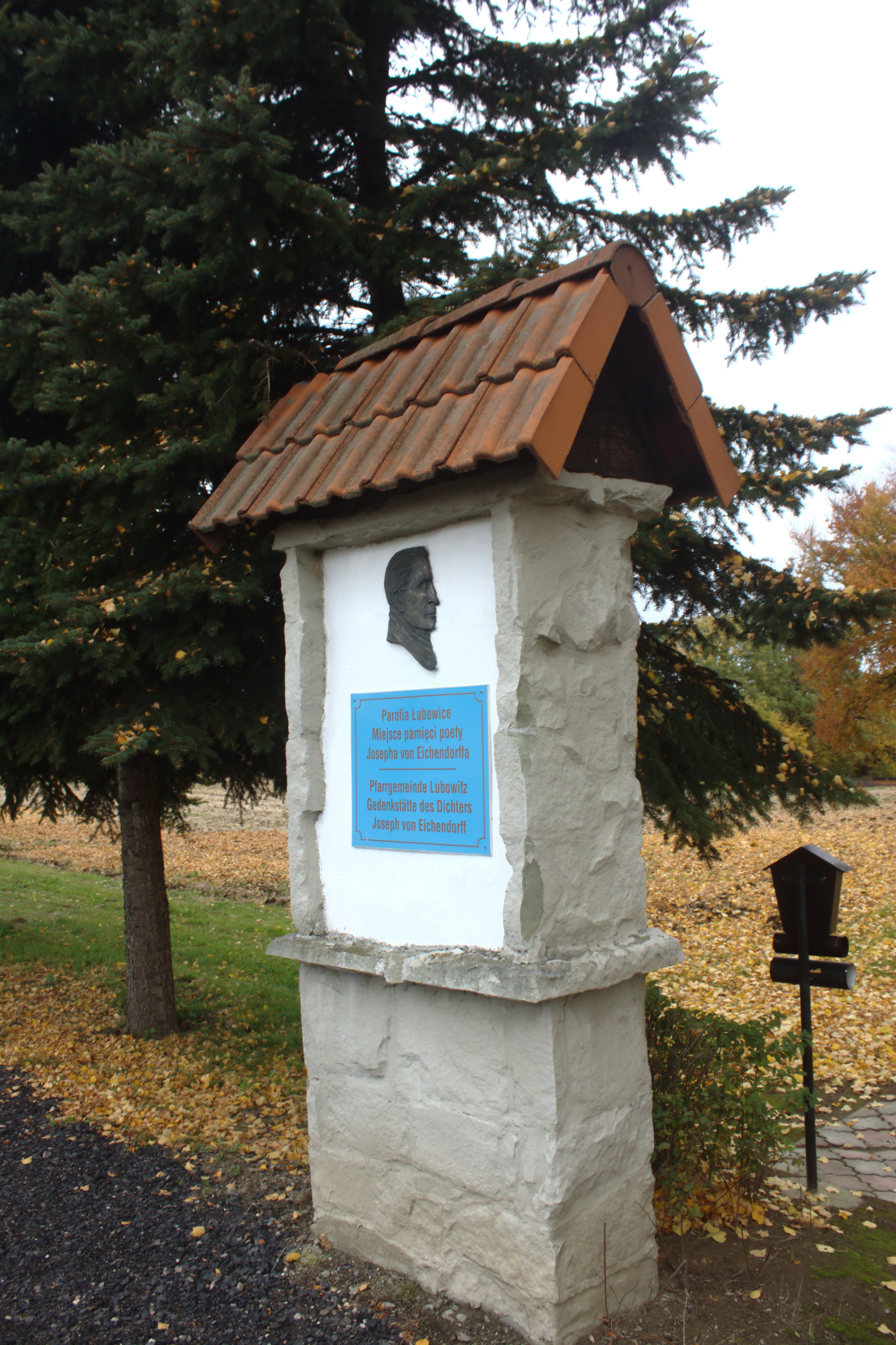
Memorial in Łubowice

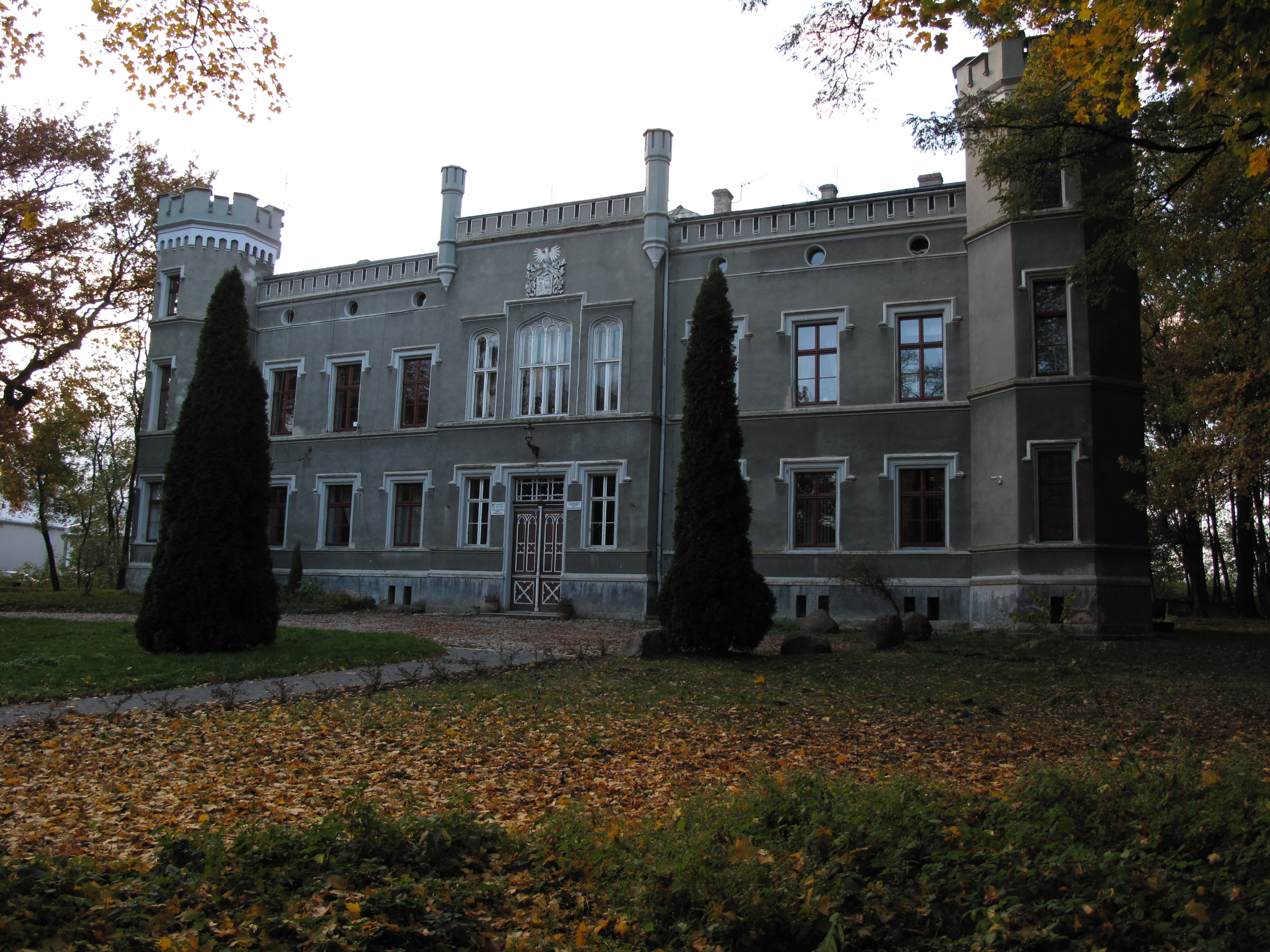
Palace in Modzurów

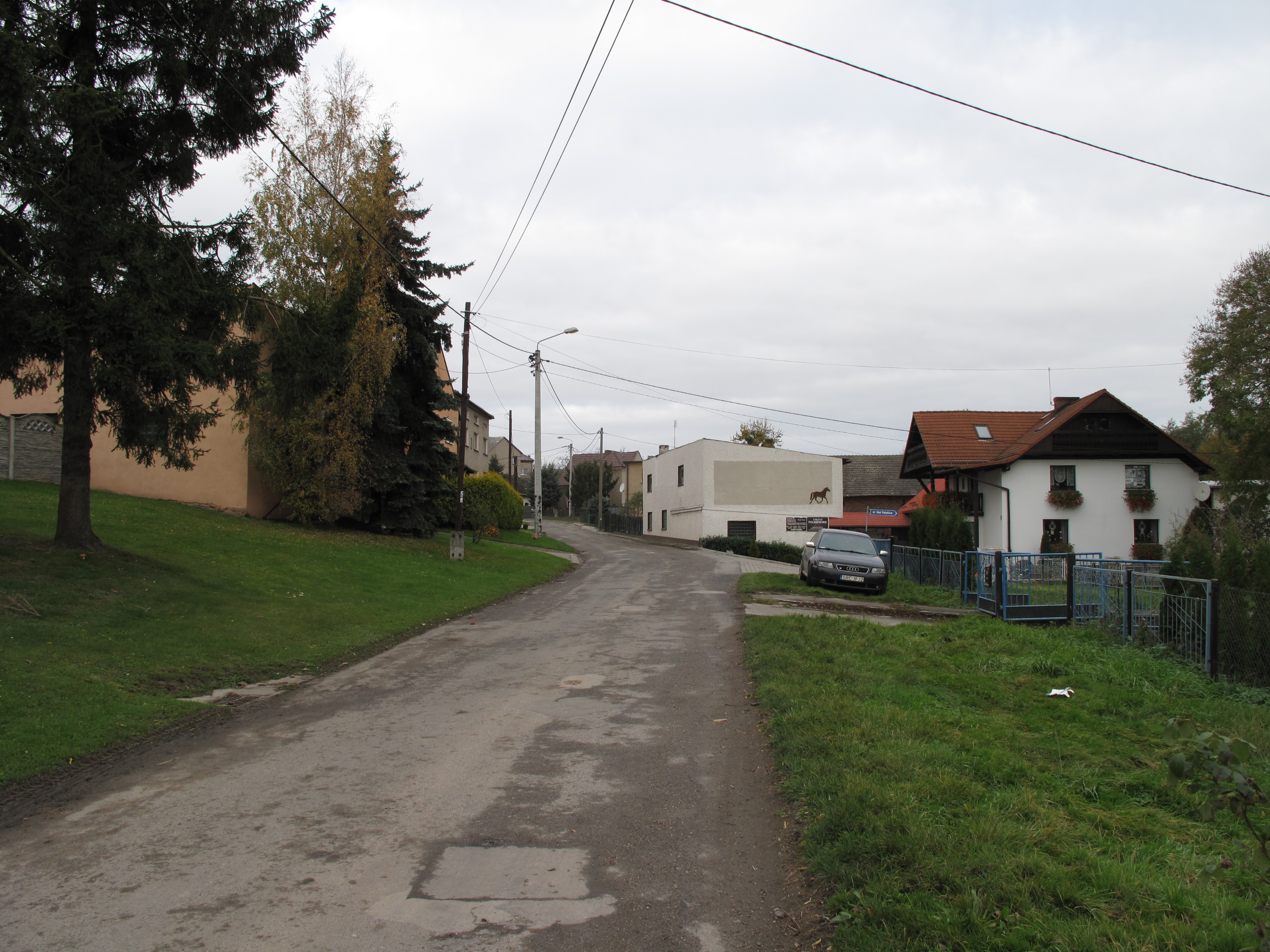
Road in Ligota Książęca
