= Gacki, Silesian Voivodeship =

Gacki
- Village
- Location within Poland
- Coordinates: 50°10′11″N 18°12′50″E
- Country: Poland
- Voivodeship: Silesian
- County: Racibórz
- Gmina: Rudnik

Gacki (Polish pronunciation: [ˈɡat͡skʲi]) is a village in the administrative district of Gmina Rudnik, within Racibórz County, Silesian Voivodeship, in southern Poland.
