= Vitaly Gamov =

Russian general (1962–2002)

Major General Vitaly Ivanovich Gamov (Russian: Виталий Иванович Гамов; 1962 - 28 May 2002), was a Deputy Commander of the Pacific Regional Directorate of the Border Guard Service of Russia. He was killed in his house after refusing to take bribes and allow poachers to outsource their recourse to Japan.

Gamov was born to the family of a kolkhoz truck driver in Gorny Gigant near Almaty, Kazakhstan, then part of the Soviet Union. He graduated from the school of border guards and served mostly in the Russian Far East. He took part in the First Chechen War, was a commander of the South Kurily Border Guards, then Yuzhnosakhalinsk Group of Border Guards. He became a Major General at the age of 39.

On May 21, 2002, his Yuzhno-Sakhalinsk apartment with was burnt by a flaming torch and three plastic canisters filled with petrol thrown through the window. At the time of the incident Vitaly Gamov, his wife Larissa and his son Ivan were in the apartment. As Vitaly Gamov struggled to put out the flames, his son opened a door to escape. A gust of air swept into the room, causing the burning petrol to explode. Ivan managed to escape with only minor burns, but his parents were less fortunate. From Sakhalin, Ivan's 38-year-old mother was eventually flown to a hospital in Tokyo. There, she underwent months of treatment for burns covering her entire body. Ivan's father only made it as far as Sapporo, on the neighbouring Japanese island of Hokkaido. "Vitaly never passed out, though his skin was flaking," a neighbour told Reuters. "I led him to the ambulance. His skin was grey and tough like wood. It was an awful sight." A week later, Gamov died in the hospital.

On November 17, 2006, four and a half years after the deadly attack, three men (Alexei Anikin, Alexei Britov and Sergei Malyutin) faced a Yuzhno-Sakhalinsk court and were declared guilty of arson and manslaughter. The persecutors insisted on the charges of intentional murder but the court found that they were not proven. The accused were sentenced to four years in prison. The case was appealed in the Supreme Court of the Russian Federation but on 26 November 2008 it decided not to change the sentence
