= Gamów =

- Village
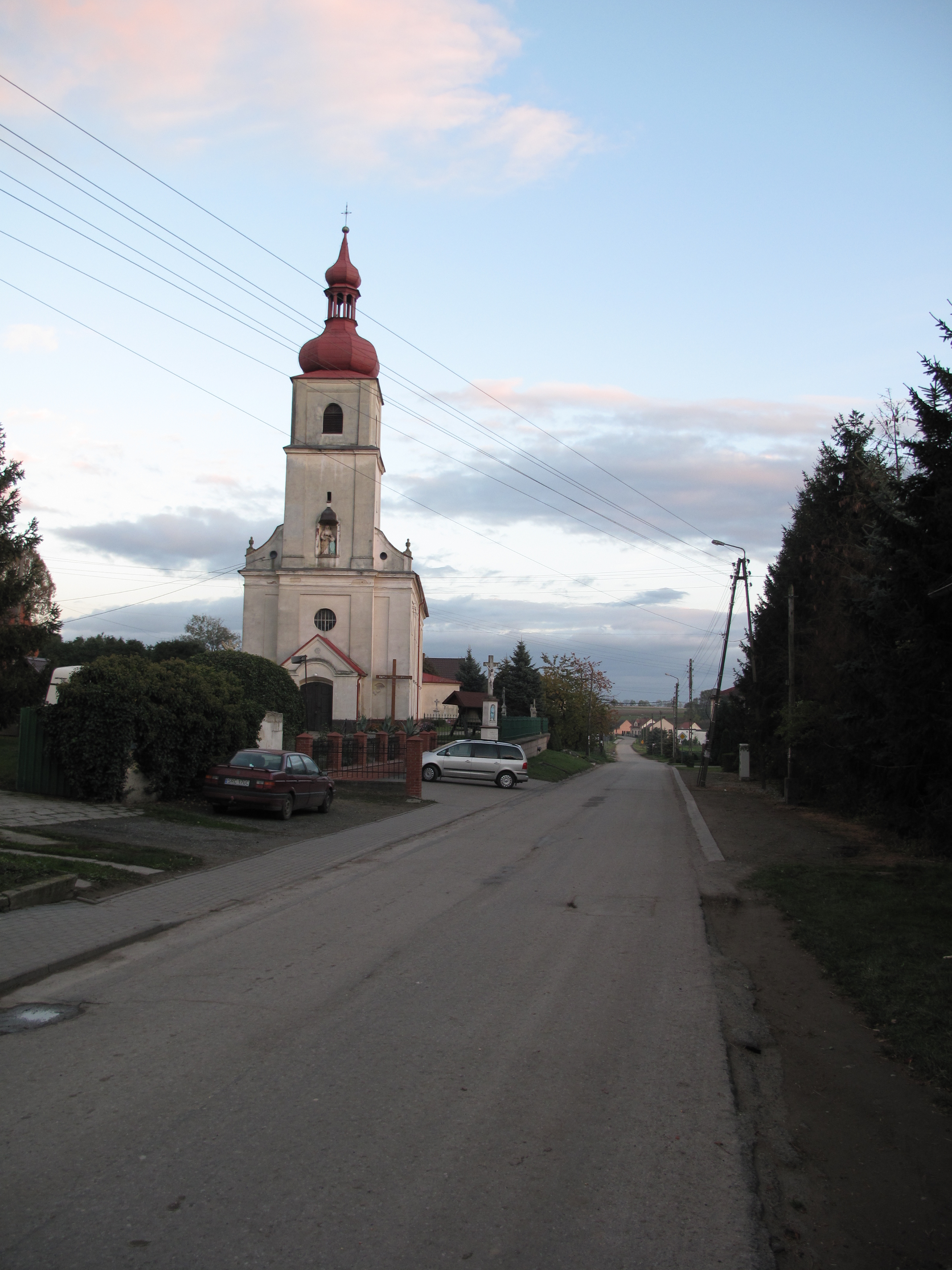
- Church

- Location within Poland
- Coordinates: 50°8′6″N 18°7′44″E
- Country: Poland
- Voivodeship: Silesian
- County: Racibórz
- Gmina: Rudnik
- Population: 470

Gamów [ˈɡamuf] is a village in the administrative district of Gmina Rudnik, within Racibórz County, Silesian Voivodeship, in southern Poland.

== Gallery ==
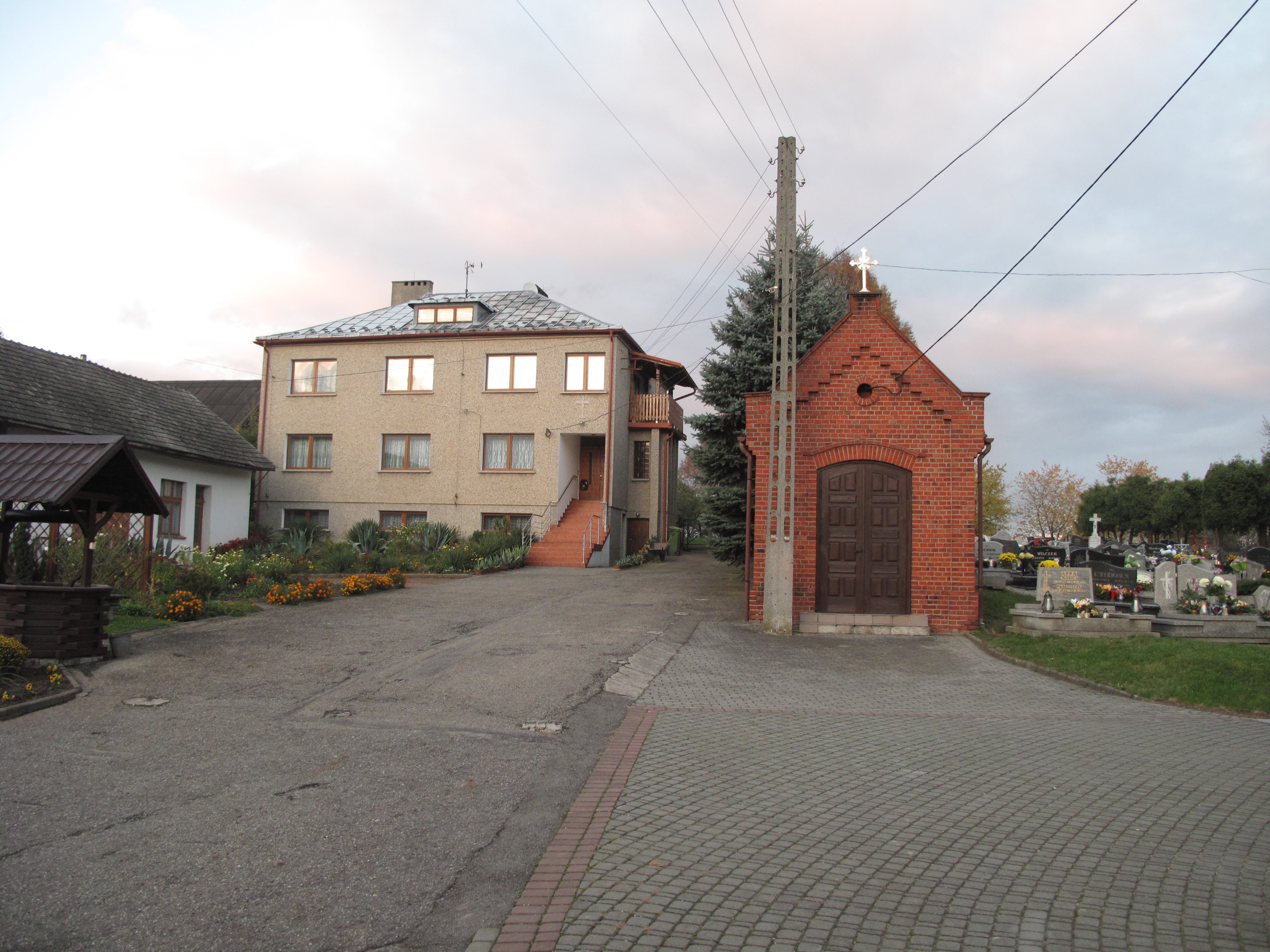
Chapell and rectory

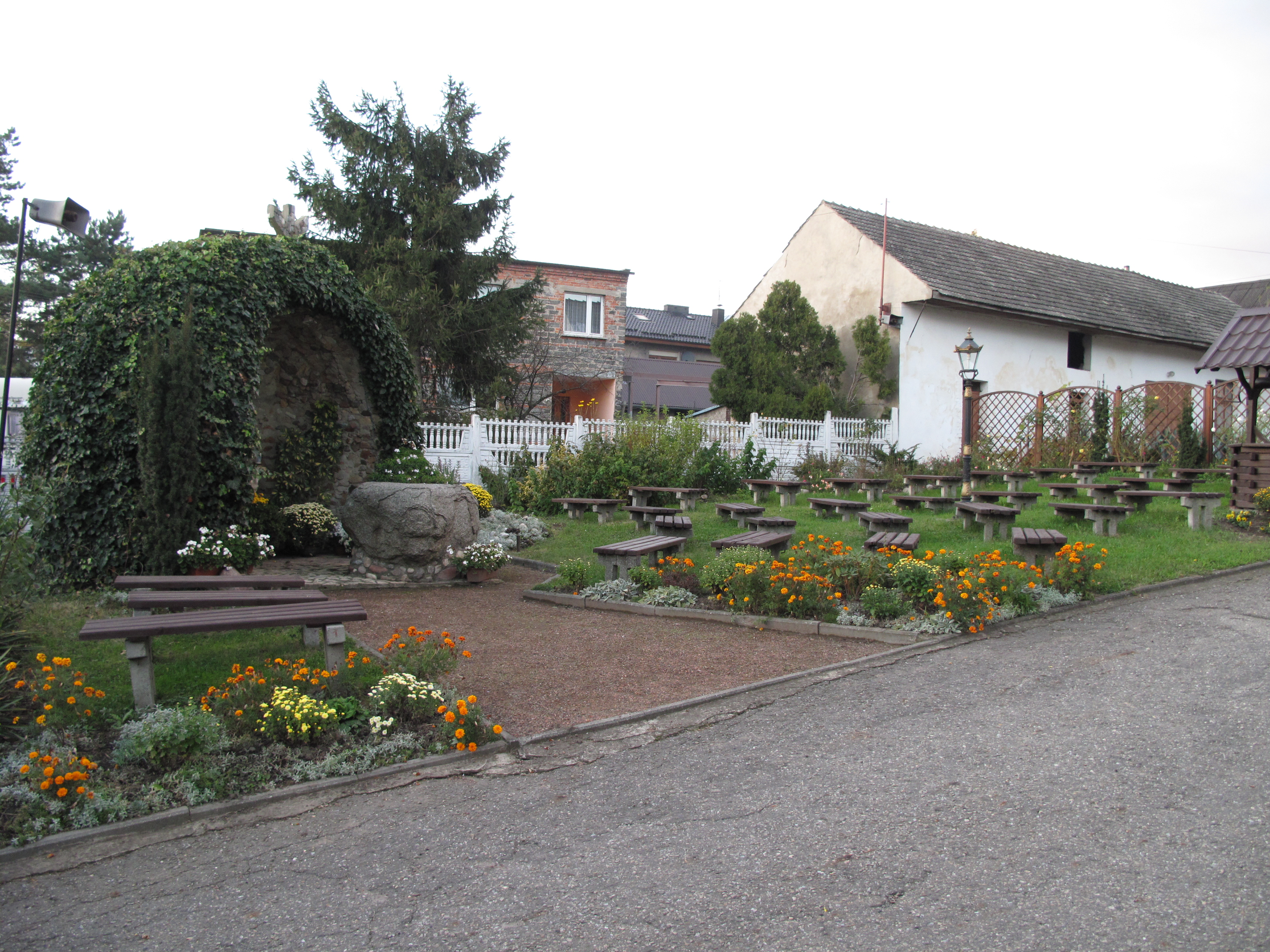

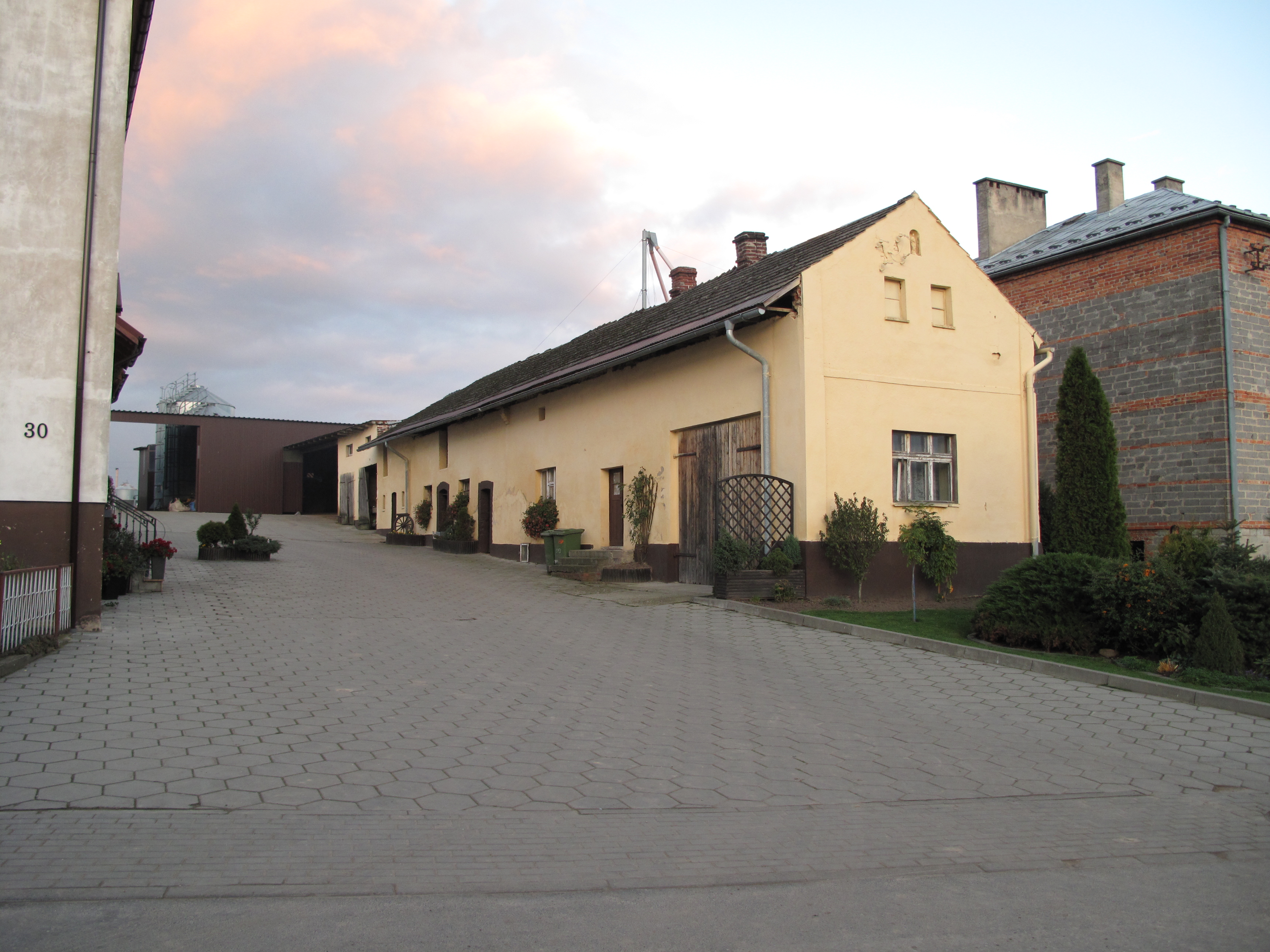
Yard
