= Rybnik Towarowy–Chałupki railway =

Railway line in the southwestern part of the Silesian Voivodeship

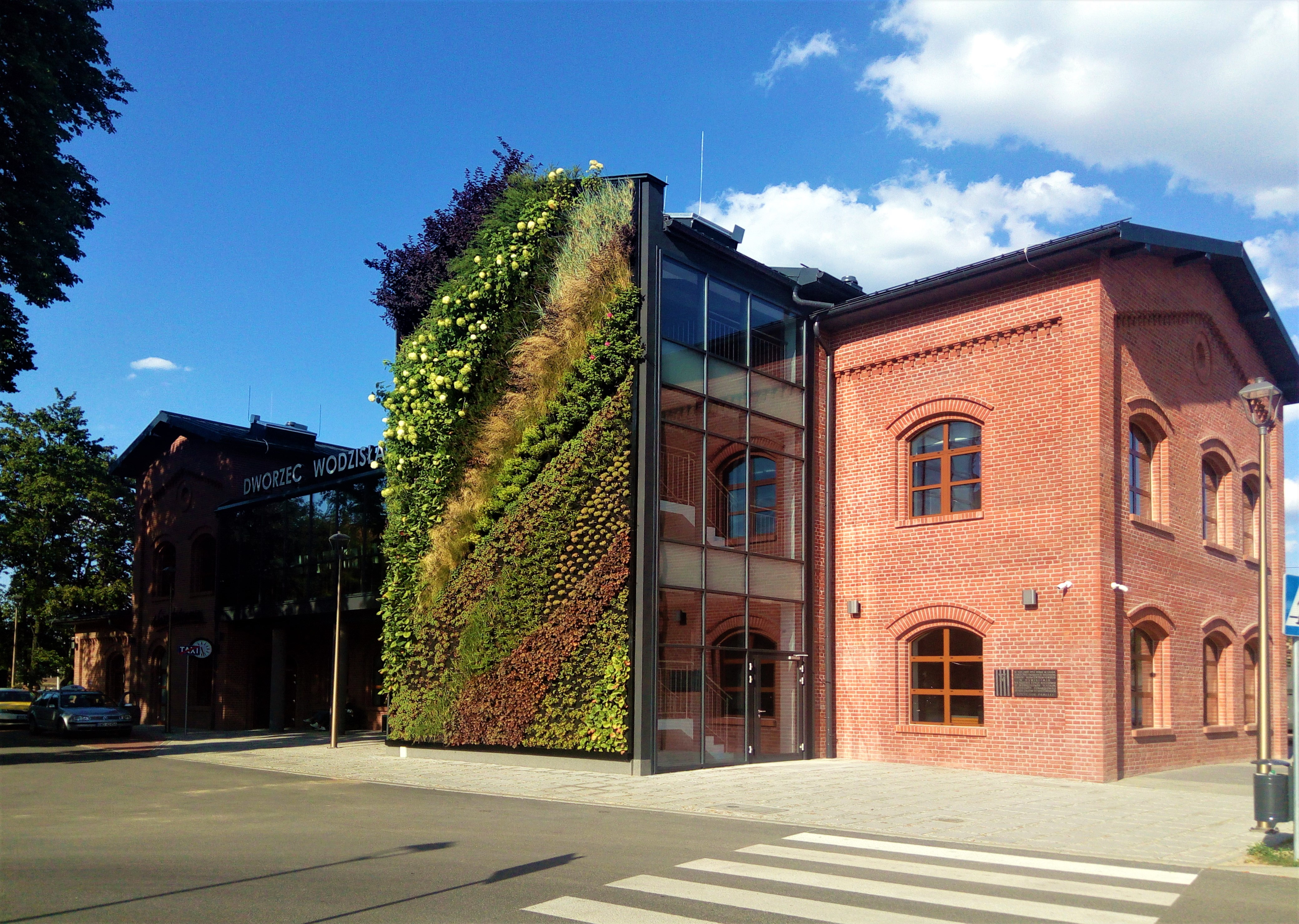
- Railroad station in Wodzisław Śląski

Overview
- Owner: PKP Polskie Linie Kolejowe
- Termini: Katowice Ligota; Chałupki-Bohumín

Service
- Route number: 158

History
- Opened: 1882 (Rybnik Towarowy–Wodzisław Śląski); 1886 (Wodzisław Śląski–Chałupki)

Technical
- Line length: 25.327 km (15.737 mi)
- Track gauge: 1,435 mm (4 ft 8 1/2 in)
- Electrification: 3,000 V DC
- Operating speed: 80 km/h (50 mph)

Rybnik Towarowy–Chałupki railway, designated as rail line number 158, is a railway line in the southwestern part of the Silesian Voivodeship. The entire length of the line is electrified, the section from Rybnik Towarowy to Wodzisław Śląski is double-track, while the section from Wodzisław Śląski to Chałupki and the track within the Rybnik Towarowy station area are single-track.

The line is classified as a secondary and of national significance. It belongs to the regional branch of PKP Polskie Linie Kolejowe in Tarnowskie Góry.

== Route of the line ==
Rail line number 158 begins at Rybnik Towarowy railway station in the Niedobczyce district, branching off from Katowice Ligota–Nędza railway line. Between Rybnik Towarowy and Wodzisław Śląski stations, the line intersects with lines number 862, 877, and 876, which connect these stations via a siding at the Marcel Coal Mine. South of Wodzisław Śląski station, the line runs parallel to inactive lines number 159 (to Orzesze) and number 875 (to a siding at 1 Maja Coal Mine). At Olza railway station, it connects with inactive Racibórz Markowice–Olza railway line to Racibórz Markowice railway station. From the Rudyszwałd stop, it runs together with Kędzierzyn-Koźle–Chałupki railway line all the way to the final station, Chałupki railway station.

Throughout its route, the line runs almost parallel to national road No. 78, intersecting it several times. It also intersects with national road No. 45, regional road No. 933, and the Oder river.

The line passes through the city of Rybnik, Wodzisław County (including two cities: Radlin and Wodzisław Śląski), and Racibórz County.

The line is divided into 3 sections:

- Rybnik Towarowy – Radlin Obszary (from -0.291 to 3.020);
- Radlin Obszary – Wodzisław Śląski (from 3.020 to 7.828);
- Wodzisław Śląski – Olza (from 7.828 to 25.036).

== Technical features ==
The line is equipped with automatic train control electromagnets. There are no restrictions regarding the days of the week and hours during which the line can be used. The designed speed of the line is 100 km/h. According to the state as of 29 November 2016, the following maximum speeds apply for trains:

Speed			Mileage in km/h		Speed		
track 1			from	to	track 2		
rail buses and electric multiple units	carriages	freight trains	from	to	rail buses and electric multiple units	carriages	freight trains
			-0.291	0.504	60		
60			0.504	0.700	60		
60			0.700	0.820	30		
60			0.820	7.380	60		
60			7.380	7.828			
80			7.828	25.036			
does not include restrictions from the Permanent Warning List

The entire line is classified as C3. The traction network along the entire length of the line is adapted for a maximum speed of 110 km/h, with a current capacity of 1725 A, and a minimum distance between current collectors of 20 m.

The longest block section in terms of travel time between two stations is the single-track section between Wodzisław Śląski and Olza. This section is 12,686 km long, and the travel time at the maximum permissible speed is just under 10 minutes, resulting in a capacity of approximately 6 trains per hour for this section. However, this is purely a theoretical value. For example, according to the timetable from 2023, trains of the Silesian Railways cover the Wodzisław–Olza section in about 14 minutes, PKP Intercity trains in about 10 minutes, and freight trains in 15 minutes or more. In 2023, there were calls for the reconstruction of a passing loop in Czyżowice, which would shorten the longest block section on the line by nearly half to around 6 minutes.

The line is equipped with a semi-automatic block signalling.

== Infrastructure ==
=== Branches ===
destination	line			source
destination	number	direction	status	source
Rybnik Towarowy	140	Katowice Ligota	active	
Rybnik Towarowy	140	Nędza	active	
Radlin Obszary junction	862	Rybnik Towarowy	active	
Radlin Obszary junction	877	Radlin Marcel	active	
Wodzisław Śląski	159	Orzesze	inactive (Note: Line 159 is closed on the section Wodzisław Śląski–Pawłowice, open on the section Pawłowice–Żory and closed on the section Żory–Orzesze)	
Wodzisław Śląski	875	1 Maja Coal Mine	inactive	
Wodzisław Śląski	876	Radlin Marcel	active	
Olza	176	Racibórz Markowice	inactive	
Chałupki	151	Kędzierzyn-Koźle	active	
Chałupki	679	Chałupki-Bohumín	active	

=== Operational points ===
There are 11 operating points on the line; no ticket sales are conducted at any of them.

Type and name	Image	Number of platform edges	Infrastructure	Previous names
train station Rybnik Towarowy		3 (Note: Platform edges are shared by lines 140 and 158.)	underpass side ramp sidings: PKP Energetyka S.A.; Chwałowice Coal Mine; Jankowice Coal Mine; PKP Cargo	Niedobschütz (1882–1922) Niedobczyce (1922–1939) Niedobschütz (1939–1945) Niedobczyce (1945–1983)
train station Rybnik Rymer		2		Römergrube (1884–1922) Rymer (1922–1939) Römergrube (1939–1945) Rymer (1945–1957) Niedobczyce Rymer (1958–1983)
junction Radlin Obszary		0		Romanshof (1884–1922) Obszary (1922–1939) Romanshof (1939–1945) Obszary (1945–1949) Radlin Śląski Obszary (1950–1983) Wodzisław Śląski Obszary (1984–1999)
train station Radlin Obszary		2		Romanshof (1884–1922) Obszary (1922–1939) Romanshof (1939–1945) Obszary (1945–1949) Radlin Śląski Obszary (1950–1983) Wodzisław Śląski Obszary (1984–1999)
train station Wodzisław Śląski Radlin		2		Radlin (Oberschlesien) (1884–1922) Radlin (1922) Radlin Śląski (1923–1939) Radlin (1939–1941) Radlin (Oberschlesien) (1942–1945) Radlin (1945–1946) Radlin Śląski (1947–1986)
train station Wodzisław Śląski		3	ticket machine waiting room with toilet disused motive power depot front-side ramp defunct wagon repair shop sidings: PKP Cargo – running repair point; PKP Cargo – loading and unloading tracks	Loslau (1882–1922) Wodzisław (1922–1936) Wodzisław Śląski (1937–1939) Loslau (1939–1945) Wodzisław (1945–1946)
train station Wodzisław Śląski Centrum		1		
train station Czyżowice		1		Czyżowice (1934–1939) Czirsowitz (1939–1945)
publicly accessible trail siding and train station Bełsznica		1		Gross-Gorzütz (1886–1909) Gross-Gorschütz (1910–1922) Górzyce Śląskie (1922) Gorzyce Śląskie (1922–1935) Bełsznica (1936–1939) Belschnitz (1939–1945)
train station Olza		3		Olsu (1886–1922) Olza (1922–1939) Olsu (1939–1945) Olza near Oder river (1945–1946)
train station Rudyszwałd		3 (Note: The stop has 3 platform edges – two for line 151 and one for line 158.)		–
train station Chałupki		3 (Note: Platform edges are shared by lines 151, 158 and 679.)	front ramp sidings: PKP Cargo – parking tracks; PKP Cargo – scales	Annaberg (1847–1869) Annaberg (Preussisch Orderberg) (1870–1900) Annaberg (1901–1909) Annaberg (Oberschlesien) (1910–1939) Ruderswald (Annaberg) (1940–1941) Ruderswald (1942–1945)

=== Bridges and viaducts ===
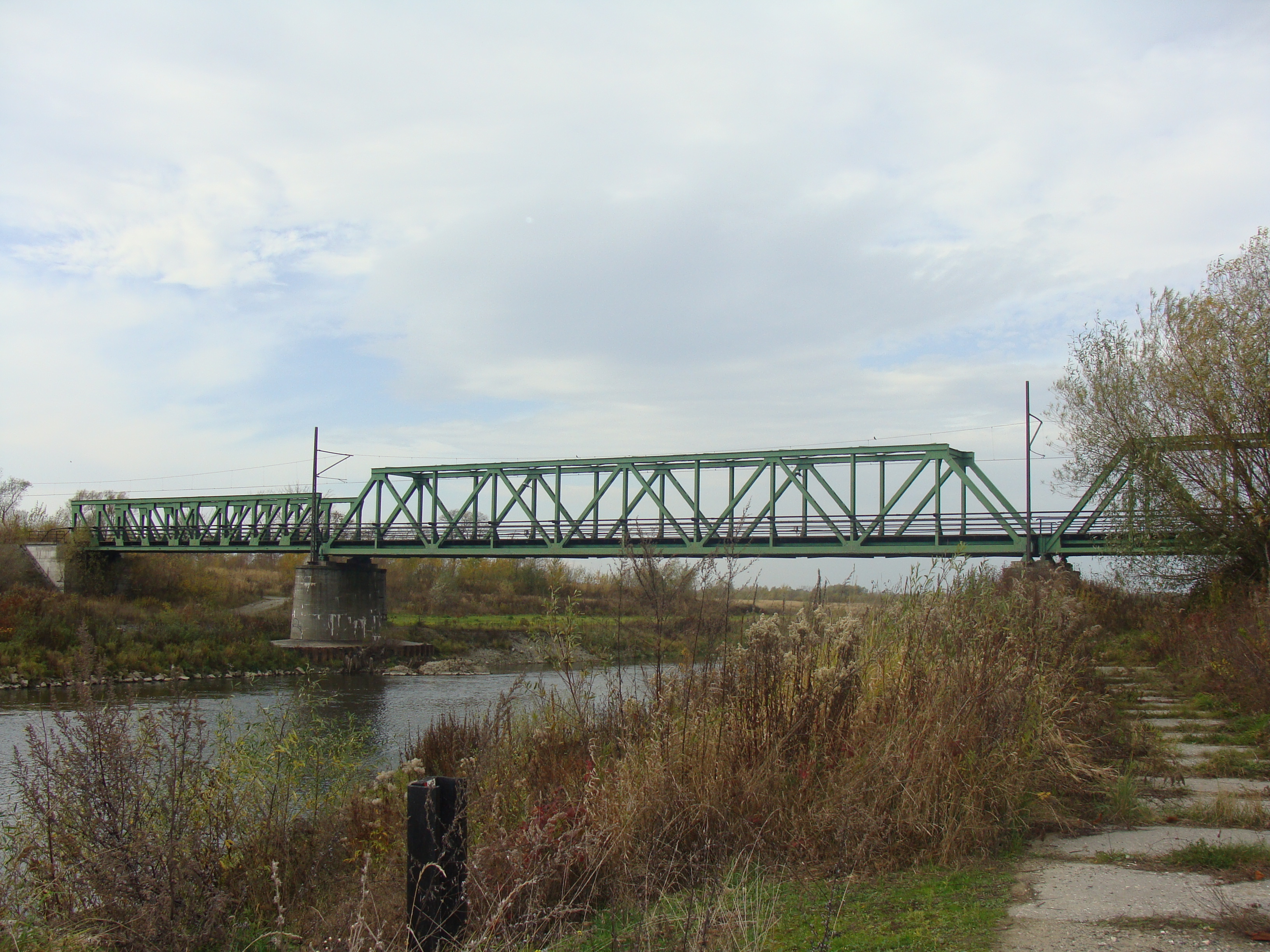
Bridge over the Oder river

The line features 8 bridges and 2 viaducts; the largest of these is the bridge over the Oder river. This is a single-track, 3-span bridge with a steel truss structure, measuring 129.85 meters in length.

== History ==
=== Background of establishment ===
In 1846, the first section of the Wilhelmsbahn (Wilhelm Railway, now Kędzierzyn-Koźle–Chałupki railway line) connecting Racibórz with Koźle was opened. At Koźle, the line connected with the Upper Silesian Railway which linked Upper Silesia with Wrocław. By 1847, the Wilhelmsbahn was extended to Bohumín. Between 1855 and 1858, further sections of the Wilhelmsbahn were opened, connecting Racibórz with Katowice through Rybnik (now Katowice Ligota–Nędza railway line).

In 1861, the residents of Wodzisław Śląski obtained permission to build a road connecting their town to the station in Czernica (now Rydułtowy station). This road was completed after a few years, providing Wodzisław with a connection to the railway leading to Racibórz and Katowice.

=== Prussian period ===
On 22 December 1882, the Niedobczyce (now Rybnik Towarowy)–Wodzisław Śląski section was opened, with the investor being the Upper Silesian Railway. In 1884, the Upper Silesian Railway, along with all other major railways, was nationalized and taken over by the Prussian state railways. The line was extended to Chałupki on 1 October 1886.

In the late 1880s and early 1890s, the line was known as the Annaberg–Rybnik line. It was constructed as a standard gauge secondary line, and trains operated on it at a speed of 30 km/h. The steepest gradient on the route had a slope of 14‰.

During World War I, the line, like most lines in the Upper Silesian Industrial Region, did not suffer any damage. However, after the war, Germany ceased investing in Upper Silesian railways out of fear of losing these territories.

On 23 May 1921, during the Third Silesian Uprising, a battle occurred along the line near the Olza railway station. After the battle, the railway bridge in Olza was blown up.

=== From 1922 to 1945 ===
On 15 May 1922, the Polish-German Upper Silesian Convention was signed in Geneva, regulating, among other things, the functioning of railways in Upper Silesia. The Wodzisław Śląski–Chałupki section became a border segment, with the border on the Oder river and passport control in the German Chałupki.

In 1924, the Czyżowice railway station was opened. By the late 1920s, to accommodate increasing freight traffic, the Wodzisław station was expanded, including the construction of a new Bahnbetriebswerk and an auxiliary workshop. In 1935, the construction of the railway line between Moszczenica and Cieszyn was completed, shortening the connection between the Rybnik Coal Area and the Czech Republic by bypassing the German Chałupki (the railway line between Wodzisław and Moszczenica was opened in 1913).

In 1939, during the September Campaign, the railways in Upper Silesia suffered minimal damage, and from 1 January 1940, they were governed by German railway law.

In January 1945, the death march of prisoners from Auschwitz concentration camp to Wodzisław Śląski took place. From there, prisoners were transported by trains into the depths of the Reich, using, among other lines, Line No. 158. During the final months of the war, the bridge over the Oder river was destroyed during the Red Army's offensive.

=== Post-1945 period ===
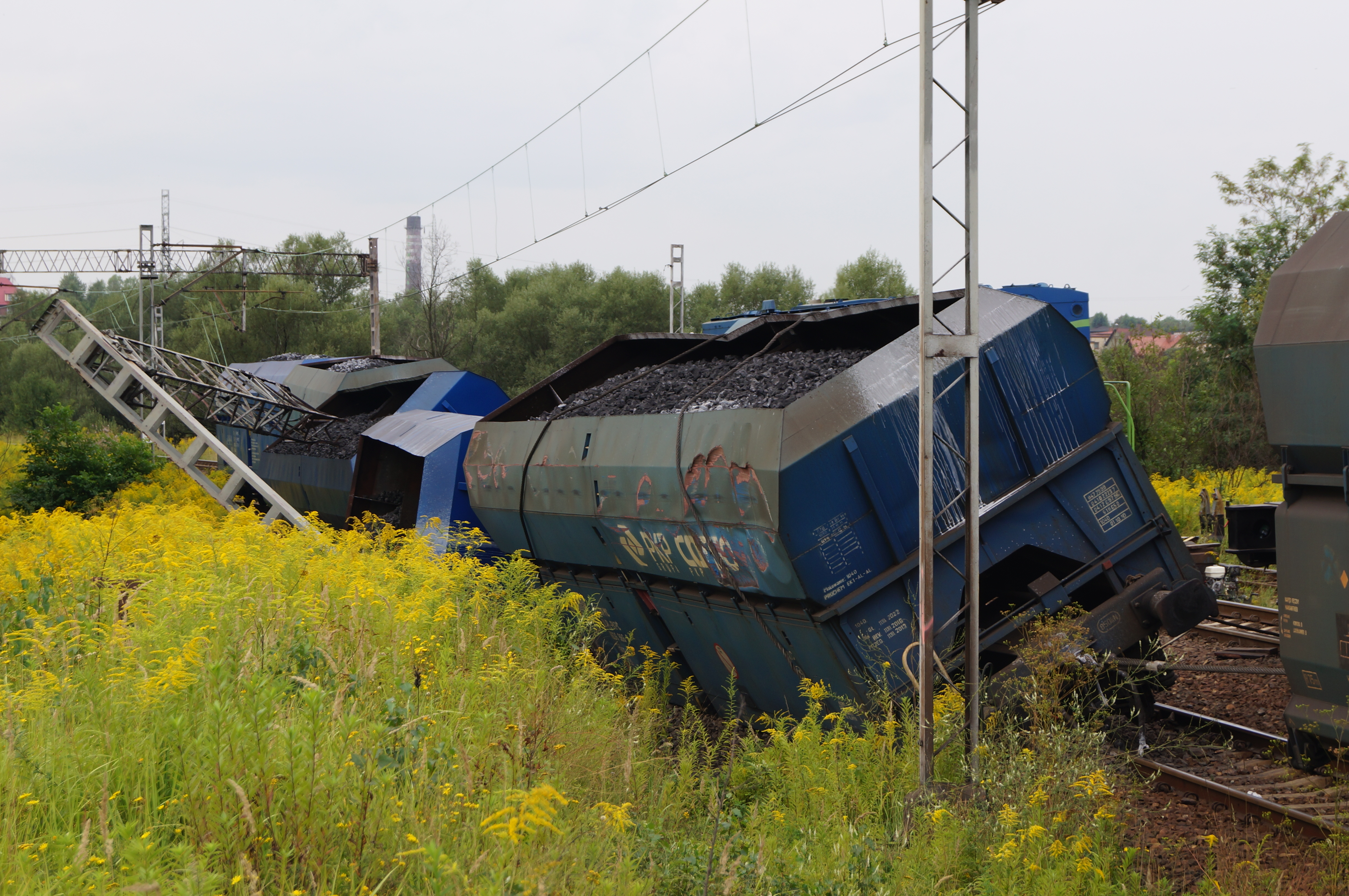
Derailed freight train (August 20, 2012)

In 1956, the bridge over the Oder river was rebuilt. In 1964, a second track was added on the Rybnik Towarowy–Wodzisław Śląski section, and on 17 November 1981 the electrification of this section was completed. On 21 December 1984, the electrification of the Wodzisław Śląski–Chałupki section was also completed. In both cases, the first electric train to run on these sections was an EN57. In 1984, partial major repairs of both tracks were carried out. In 1990, the Rudyszwałd railway station was opened. In 2007, the passing siding in Czyżowice was dismantled.

Between 2007 and 2008, major repairs were carried out on track No. 1 of the Rybnik Towarowy–Wodzisław Śląski section, and a year later, on more than a two-kilometer section of track No. 2 between Rybnik Towarowy and Rybnik Rymer. On 11 May 2012, a part of the Wodzisław Śląski bypass was opened, which included a viaduct over Line No. 158 between the Wodzisław Śląski station and the Wodzisław Śląski Radlin railway station.

On 20 August 2012, a train carrying coke derailed between the Rybnik Towarowy and Rybnik Rymer stations. On 9 December 2012, passenger traffic on the Wodzisław Śląski–Chałupki section was suspended, and on the Wodzisław Śląski–Rybnik Towarowy section, Polregio trains were replaced by Silesian Railways trains.

=== Revitalization of the line ===
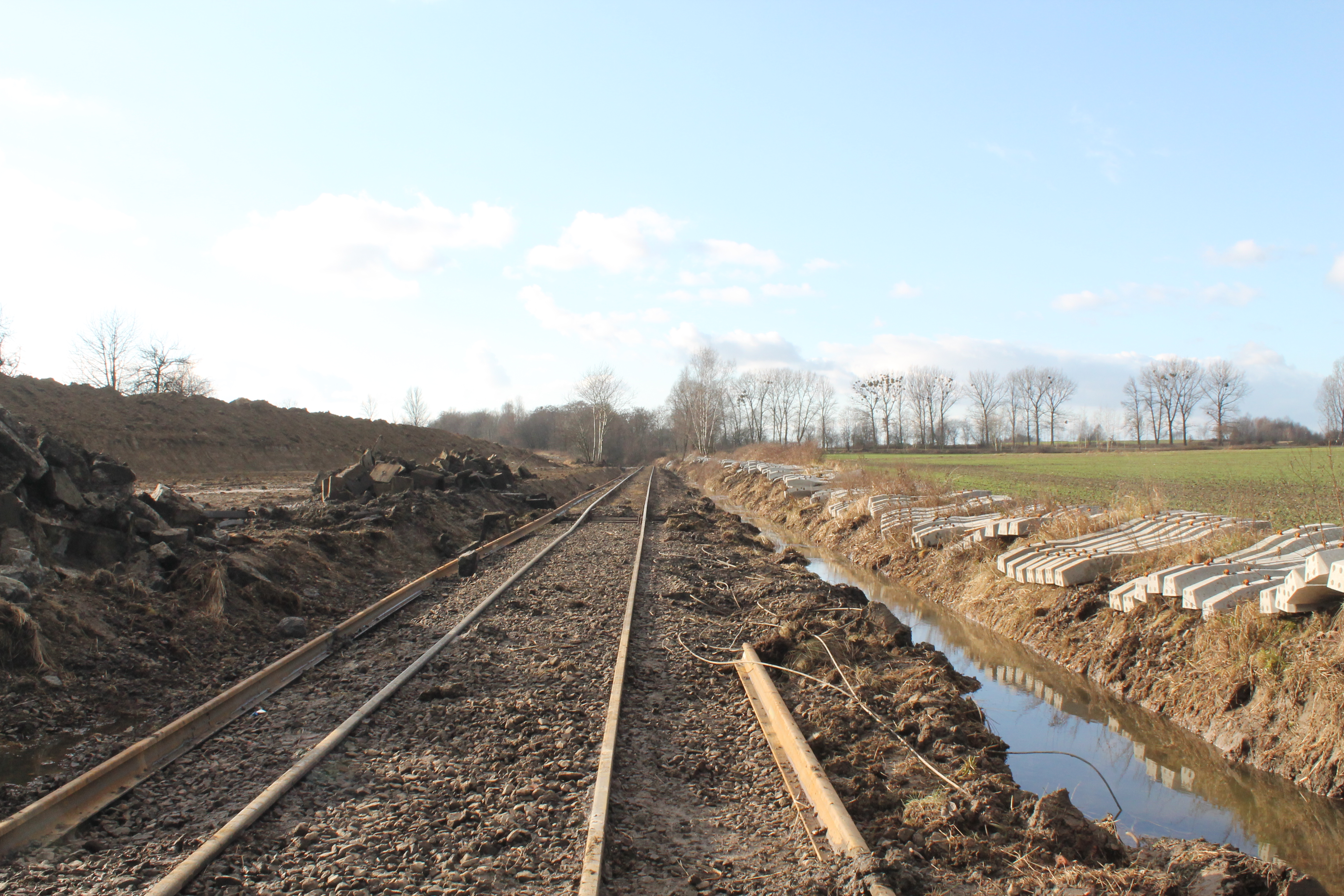
Revitalization of the line (December 2014)

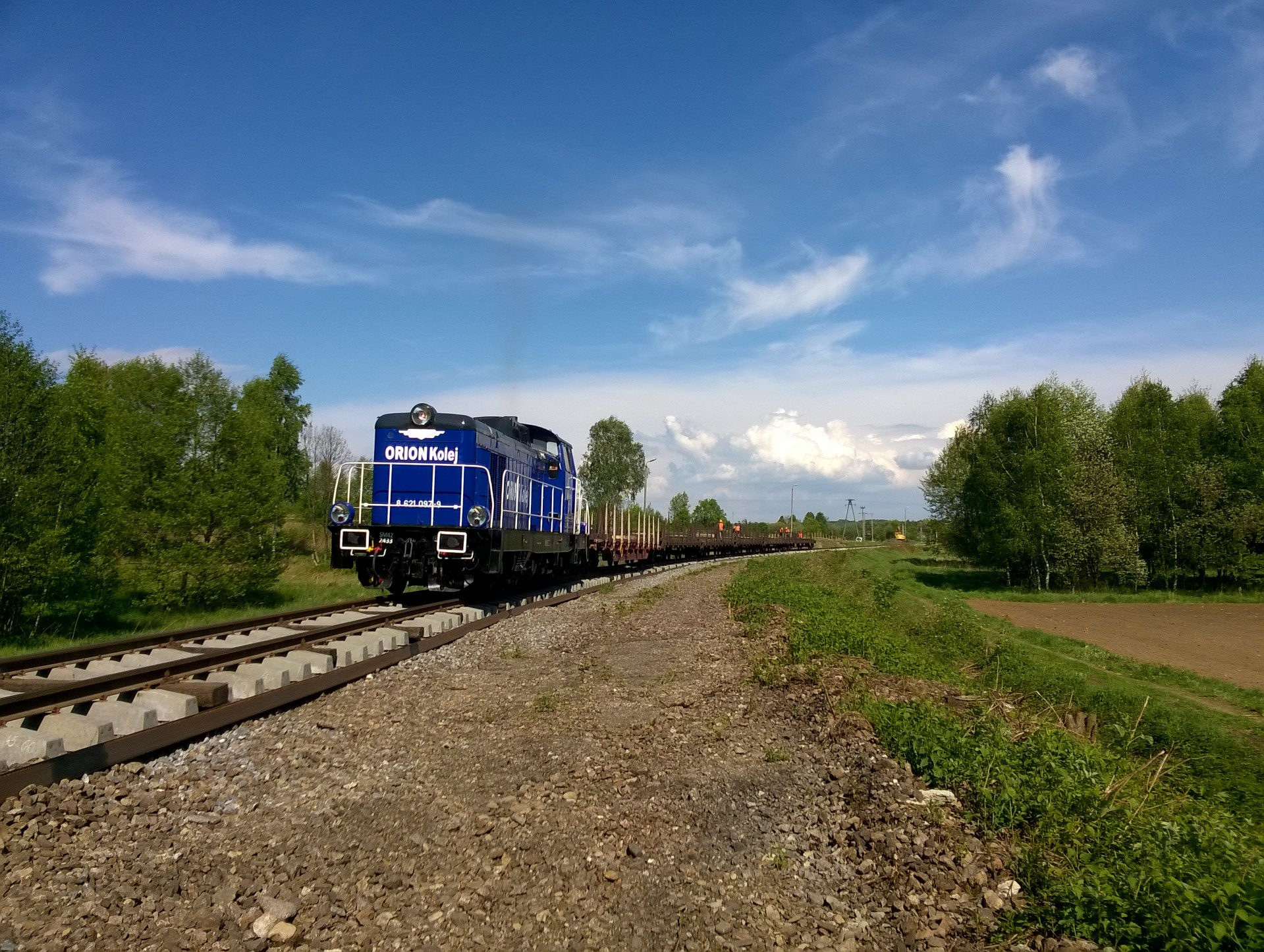
Revitalization of the line (May 2015)

On 30 June 2014, PKP Polskie Linie Kolejowe signed an agreement with the Center for EU Transport Projects for funding the revitalization of Line No. 158, including the section of Katowice Ligota–Nędza railway line between Rybnik Towarowy and Rybnik stations, under the Cohesion Fund. On July 30, the company signed a second agreement with a consortium of Rubau Polska, Construcciones Rubau, and Rover Alcisa to carry out the work.

By late October 2014, the single-track section from Wodzisław Śląski to Chałupki was closed for traffic, and the dismantling of railway infrastructure elements began. From March 15 to October 31, 2015, due to work at the Wodzisław Śląski station, access from Rybnik was not possible. Consequently, Silesian Railways passenger trains from Katowice and Rybnik terminated at the Wodzisław Śląski Radlin stop, with replacement bus services to the Wodzisław station.

On 25 March 2015, the city of Wodzisław Śląski purchased the railway station from Polish State Railways. The city was planning to renovate the station and establish a transportation hub there.

During the renovation, 13 platforms were refurbished and made accessible for people with disabilities. They were equipped with new lighting systems, shelters, clocks, and PA systems for train announcements. A total of 43 railroad switches and railway traffic control devices were replaced, 24 railway level crossings were modernized, 30 km of railway lines were revitalized, and signal box buildings were repaired. As a result, the maximum speed on the line increased to 80 km/h. The track layouts at the Wodzisław Śląski station (6 out of 14 tracks) and the Olza station (3 out of 6 tracks) were also rebuilt. Initially, there were plans to construct a new Wodzisław Śląski Centrum station near the bus station. However, due to a lack of agreement between the city and PKP Polskie Linie Kolejowe regarding the possibility of terminating trains at the new station, this idea was abandoned. Additionally, the planned reconstruction of the passing siding in Czyżowice was not included in the revitalization plans and its future remains uncertain.

The contract deadline for completing all work was 30 October 2015, but this was not met. On December 10, three days before the planned resumption of train services between Wodzisław and Chałupki, PKP Polskie Linie Kolejowe announced that due to incomplete renovation work, the line would not reopen until the second half of January. As a result, on December 13, Silesian Railways launched replacement bus services between Wodzisław and Chałupki, and PKP Intercity redirected planned EIC trains via Zebrzydowice and provided replacement services for passengers who had pre-purchased tickets to or from stations in Mikołów, Rybnik, Wodzisław Śląski, or Chałupki. The main reason for the delay was incomplete railway-road crossings or unconnected power supply devices at these crossings. On 8 January 2016, the Wodzisław Śląski–Chałupki section was reopened for traffic.

=== Restoration of the line to traffic and further work ===
On 12 January 2016, Silesian Railways and PKP Intercity began test and familiarization runs, even though the Wodzisław Śląski and Olza stations were not fully operational. Passenger train services between Wodzisław and Chałupki resumed on January 18, but due to ongoing work, the trains could not maintain scheduled travel times. The unfinished state of the Wodzisław Śląski and Olza stations also caused issues for freight traffic, limiting the line's capacity. The timetable was adjusted to minimize these disruptions.

From February 11 to 15, 2016, international trains Polonia, Sobieski, and Varsovia (three pairs) were rerouted via Line 158 due to a fire at the Bohumín station, which necessitated the temporary closure of that junction.

Work on rail traffic control infrastructure and railway-road crossings continued into early March 2016. By June, work on the Wodzisław Śląski and Olza stations was completed and inspections began. Numerous defects were found during inspections, and rectifying these issues extended into August. The traffic control devices at Olza were finally approved on August 31, and additional tracks were approved on September 7. Inspections of signals at the last seven crossings commenced in December.

In March 2017, the Rybnik Towarowy station building was demolished. Track renovations at Wodzisław Śląski (tracks 4 and 6) and Olza (tracks 2 and 4) started in July as part of the "Safety Improvement and Hazard Elimination on the Railway Network" program.

On 7 June 2018, the mayors of Rybnik and Wodzisław Śląski, along with the Marshal of the Silesian Voivodeship, signed an agreement to significantly increase the frequency of connections on the Rybnik–Wodzisław Śląski section for 4.5 years. As a result, on June 10, the number of passenger connections on this section increased from 9 to 27 pairs.

On 12 May 2019, the track between Wodzisław Śląski and Olza was undermined, resulting in the complete suspension of train traffic until May 17.

In January 2023, a contract was signed for the construction of the Wodzisław Śląski Centrum stop. The first scheduled train stopped there on 10 December 2023.

== Train traffic ==
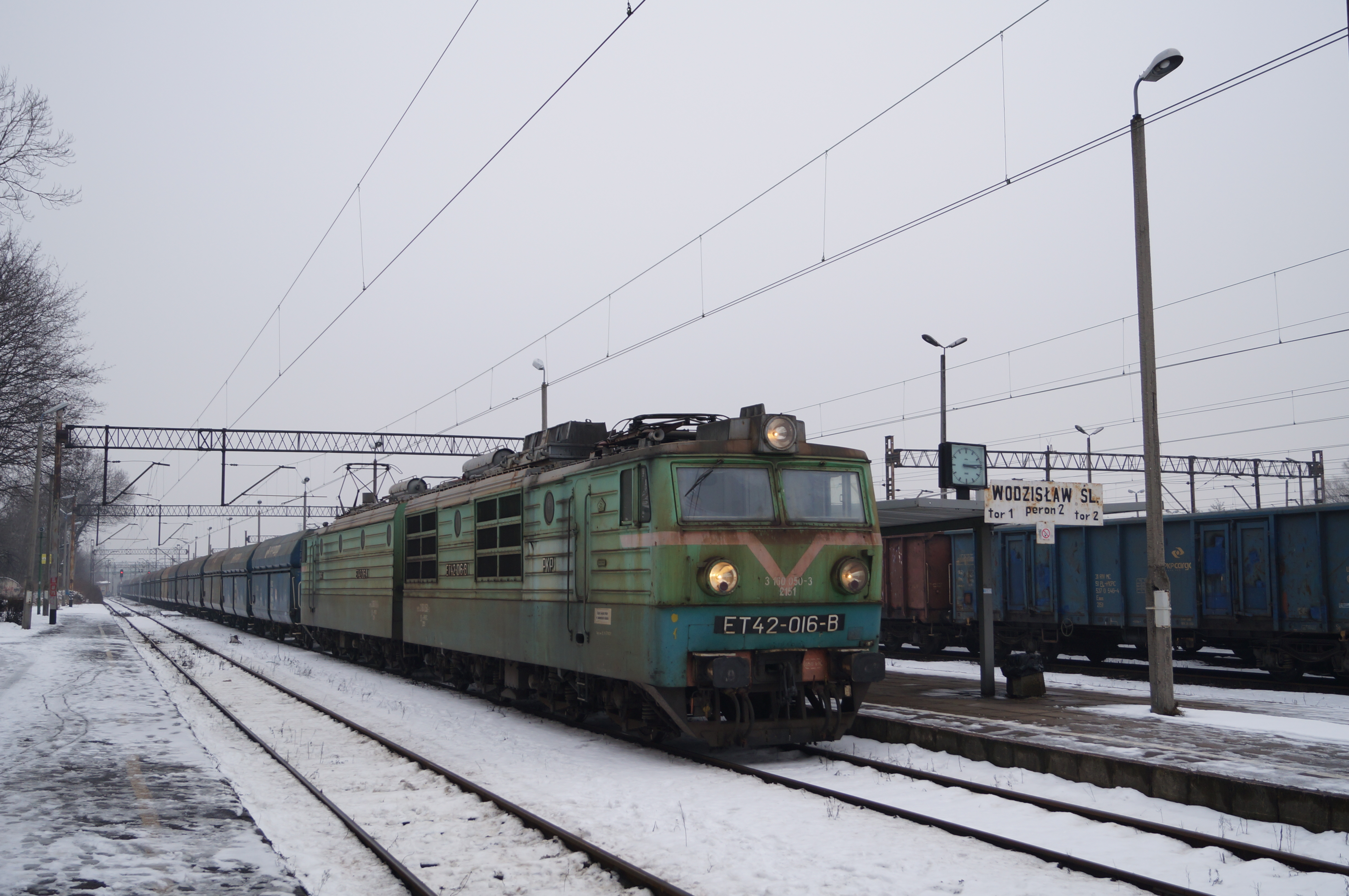
ET42 PKP Cargo with a coal train at Wodzisław Śląski station

Trains operated by Silesian Railways on line S71 run the Katowice–Bohumín route, and PKP Intercity operates EIC Comenius (Warsaw–Ostrava), Porta Moravica, and Praha (Warsaw–Prague) services on this line.

The line also supports freight train traffic.

== Bibliography ==
- Stankiewicz, Ryszard; Stiasny, Marcin (2014). Atlas Linii Kolejowych Polski 2014 (in Polish) (1 ed.). Rybnik: Eurosprinter. ISBN 978-83-63652-12-8.
- Soida, Krzysztof (1997). Dzieje Katowickiego Okręgu Kolejowego (in Polish) (1 ed.). Katowice: Śląska Dyrekcja Okręgowa Kolei Państwowych. ISBN 83-908518-0-6.
