= Bolesław, Silesian Voivodeship =

Bolesław
- Village
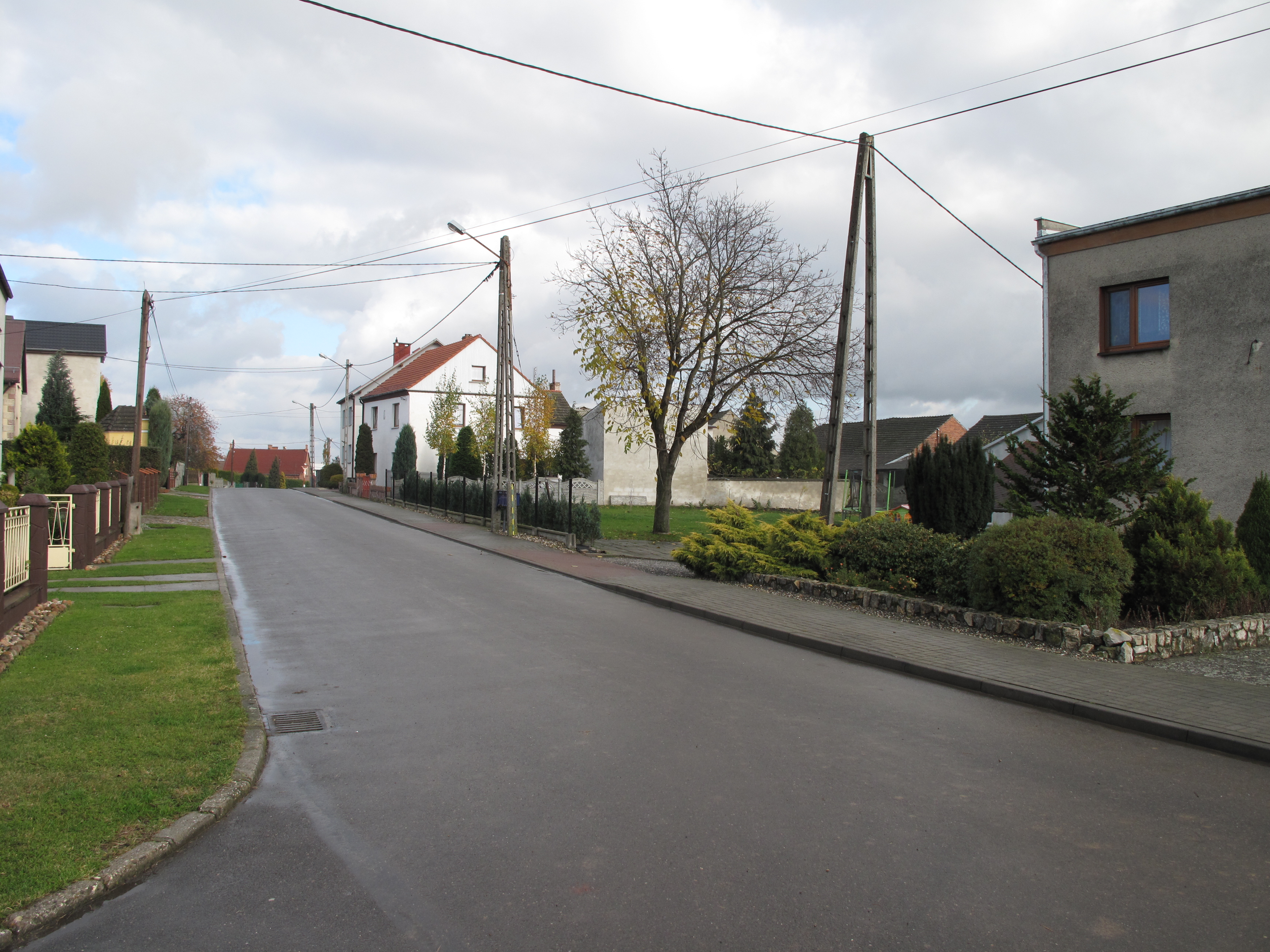
- Street

- Location within Poland
- Coordinates: 50°1′N 18°12′E
- Country: Poland
- Voivodeship: Silesian
- County: Racibórz
- Gmina: Krzyżanowice
- Population (approx.): 460

Bolesław [bɔˈlɛswaf] is a village in the administrative district of Gmina Krzyżanowice, within Racibórz County, Silesian Voivodeship, in southern Poland, close to the Czech border.

== Gallery ==
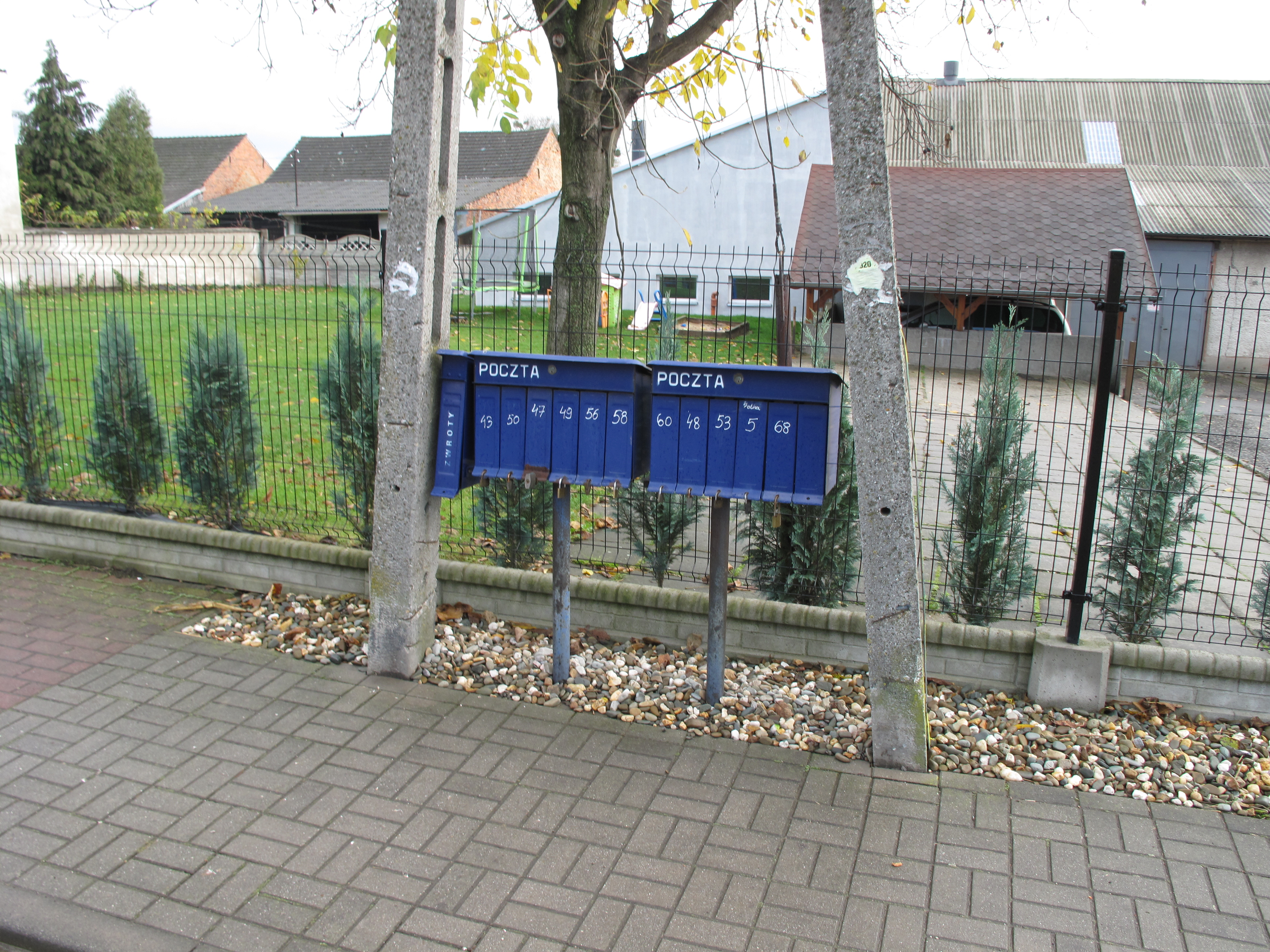
Post boxes

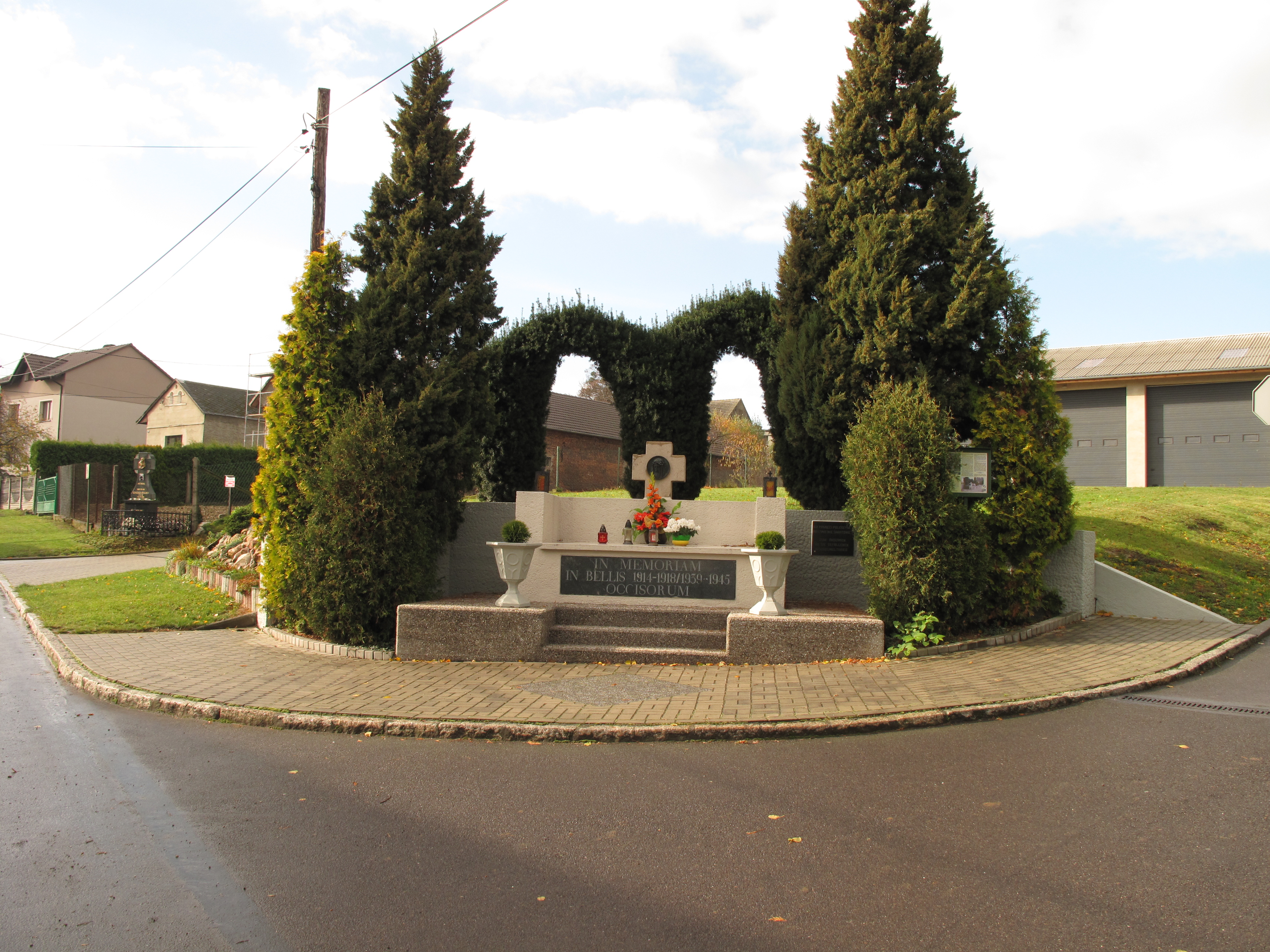
Memorial

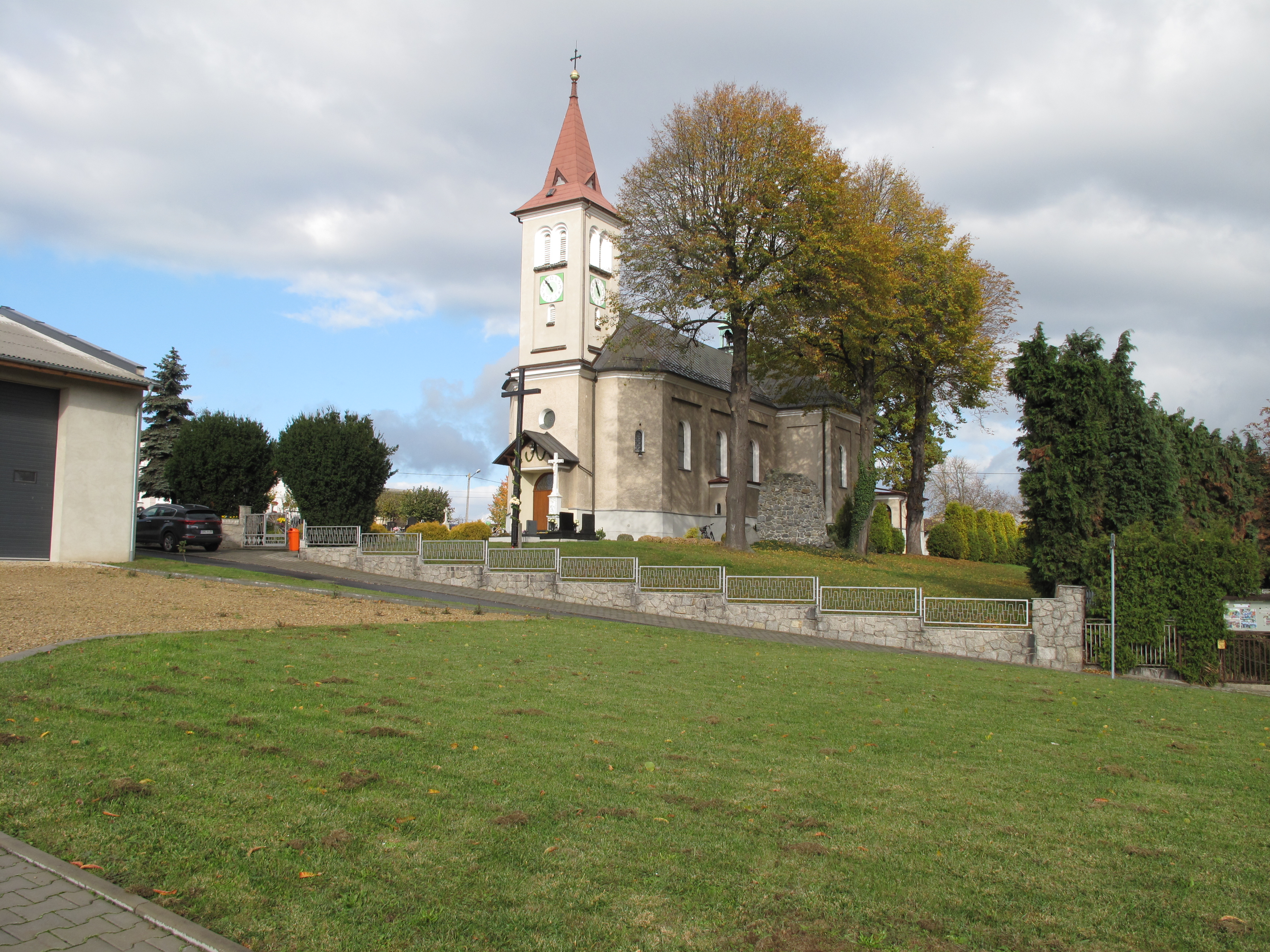
Church
