= Nowa Wioska, Racibórz County =

Nowa Wioska
- Village
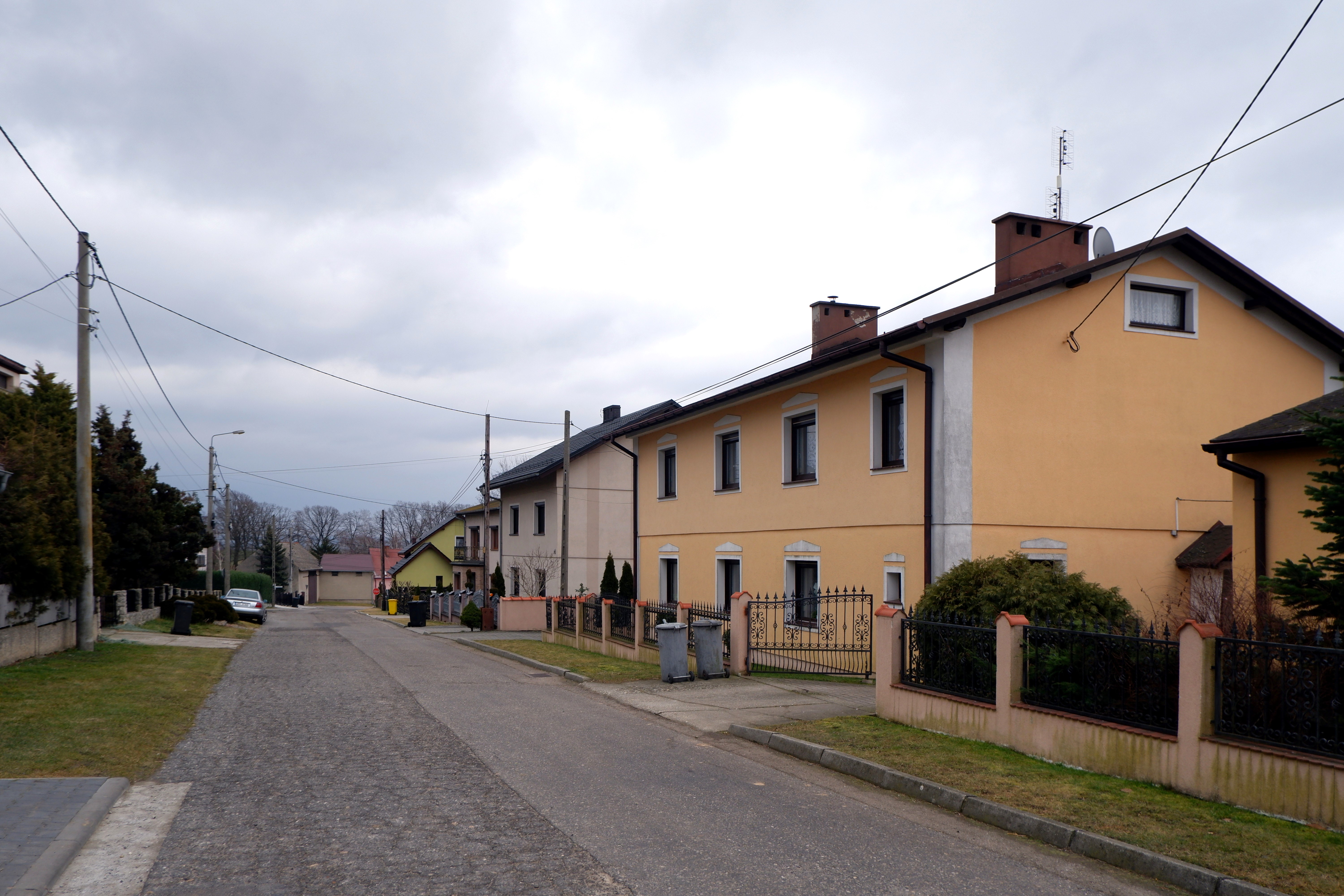

- Location within Poland
- Coordinates: 49°58′29″N 18°14′51″E
- Country: Poland
- Voivodeship: Silesian
- County: Racibórz
- Gmina: Krzyżanowice

Nowa Wioska [ˈnɔva ˈvjɔska] (German Neudörfel) is a village in the administrative district of Gmina Krzyżanowice, within Racibórz County, Silesian Voivodeship, in southern Poland, close to the Czech border.
