= Tworków =

- Village
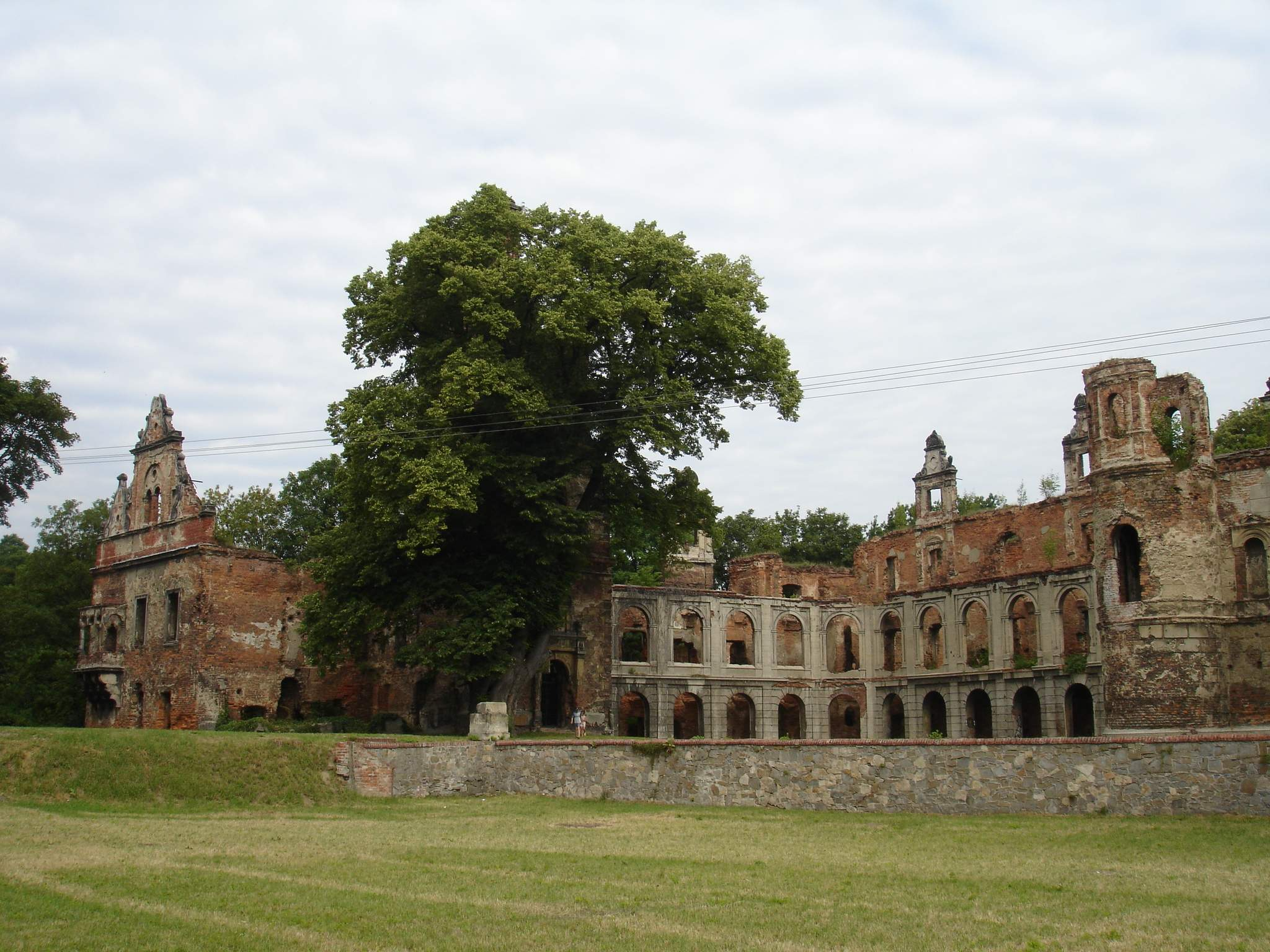
- Ruins of the palace

- Location within Poland
- Coordinates: 50°0′N 18°14′E
- Country: Poland
- Voivodeship: Silesian
- County: Racibórz
- Gmina: Krzyżanowice
- Population: 3,000
- Website: http://tworkow.pl/

Tworków [ˈtfɔrkuf] is a village in the administrative district of Gmina Krzyżanowice, within Racibórz County, Silesian Voivodeship, in southern Poland, close to the Czech border.

== Gallery ==
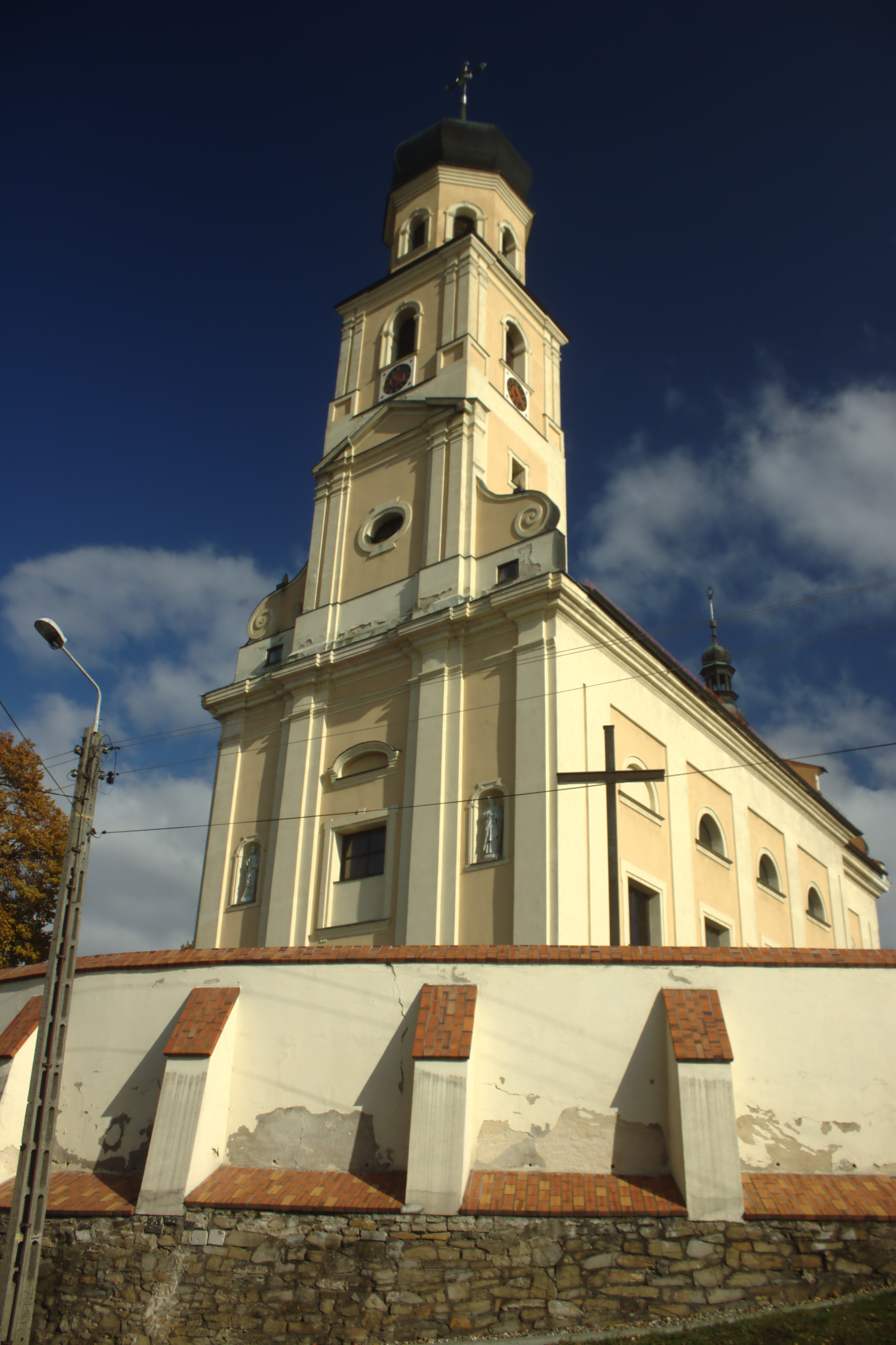
Saint Peter and Paul church in Tworków, Poland

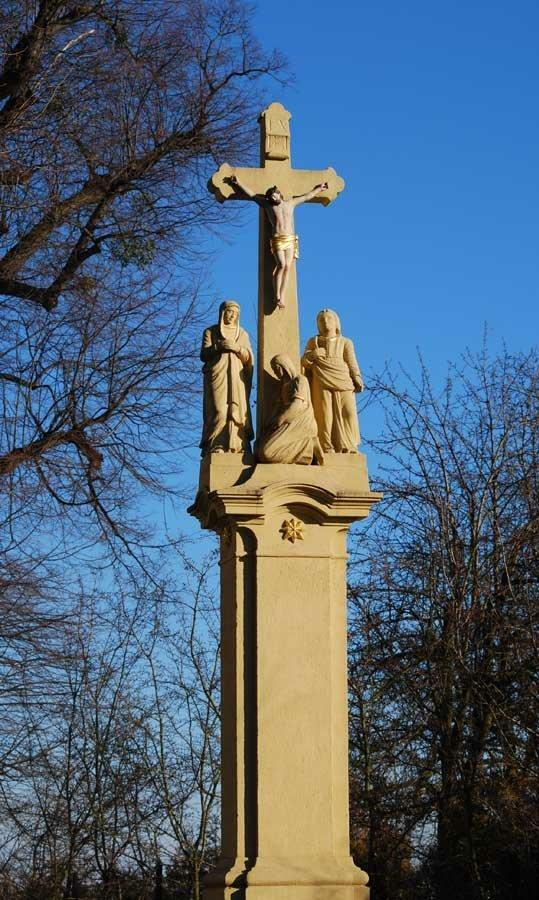
Wayside shrine

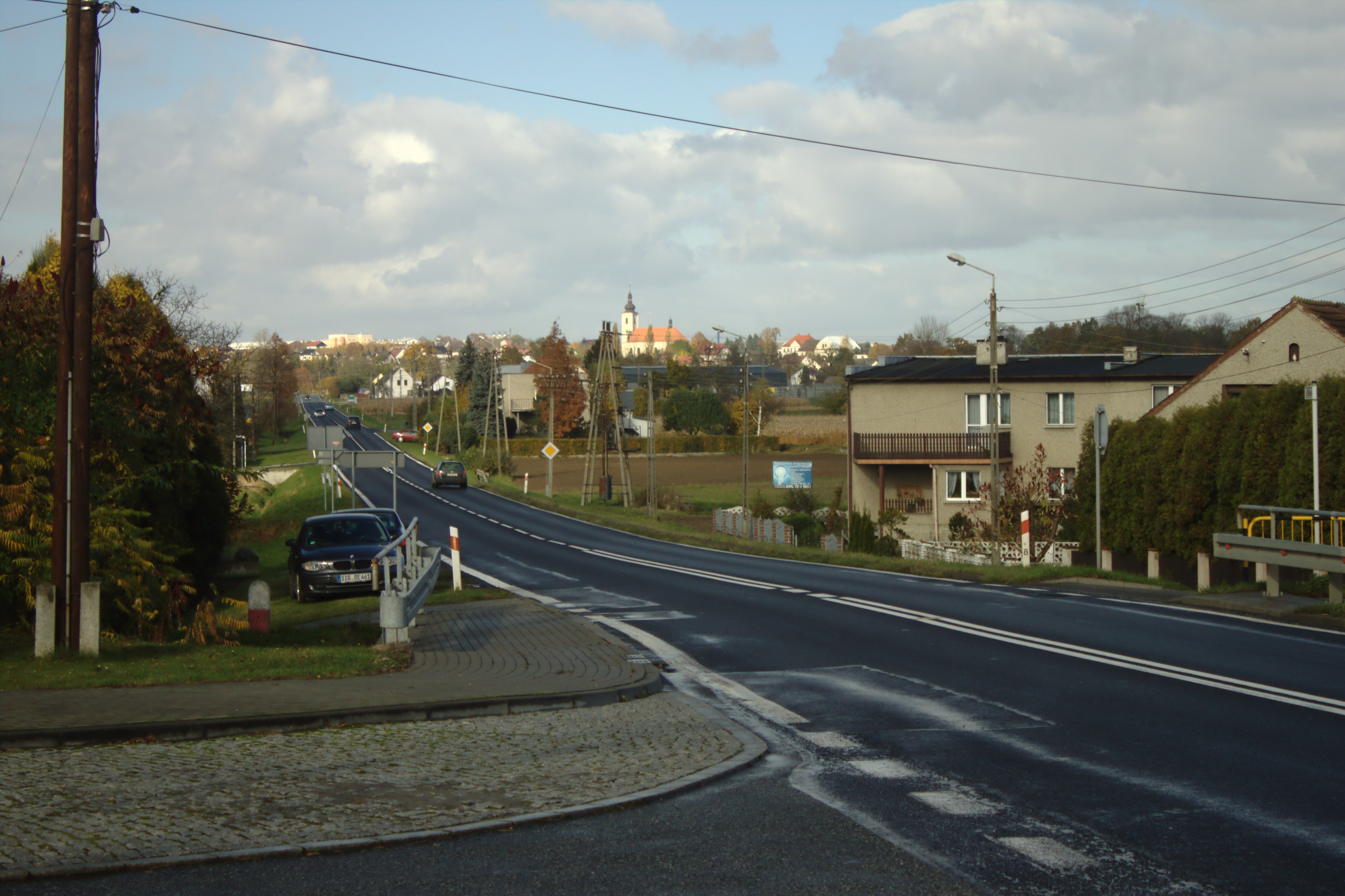
Main road
