= Krzyżanowice, Silesian Voivodeship =

Krzyżanowice
- Village
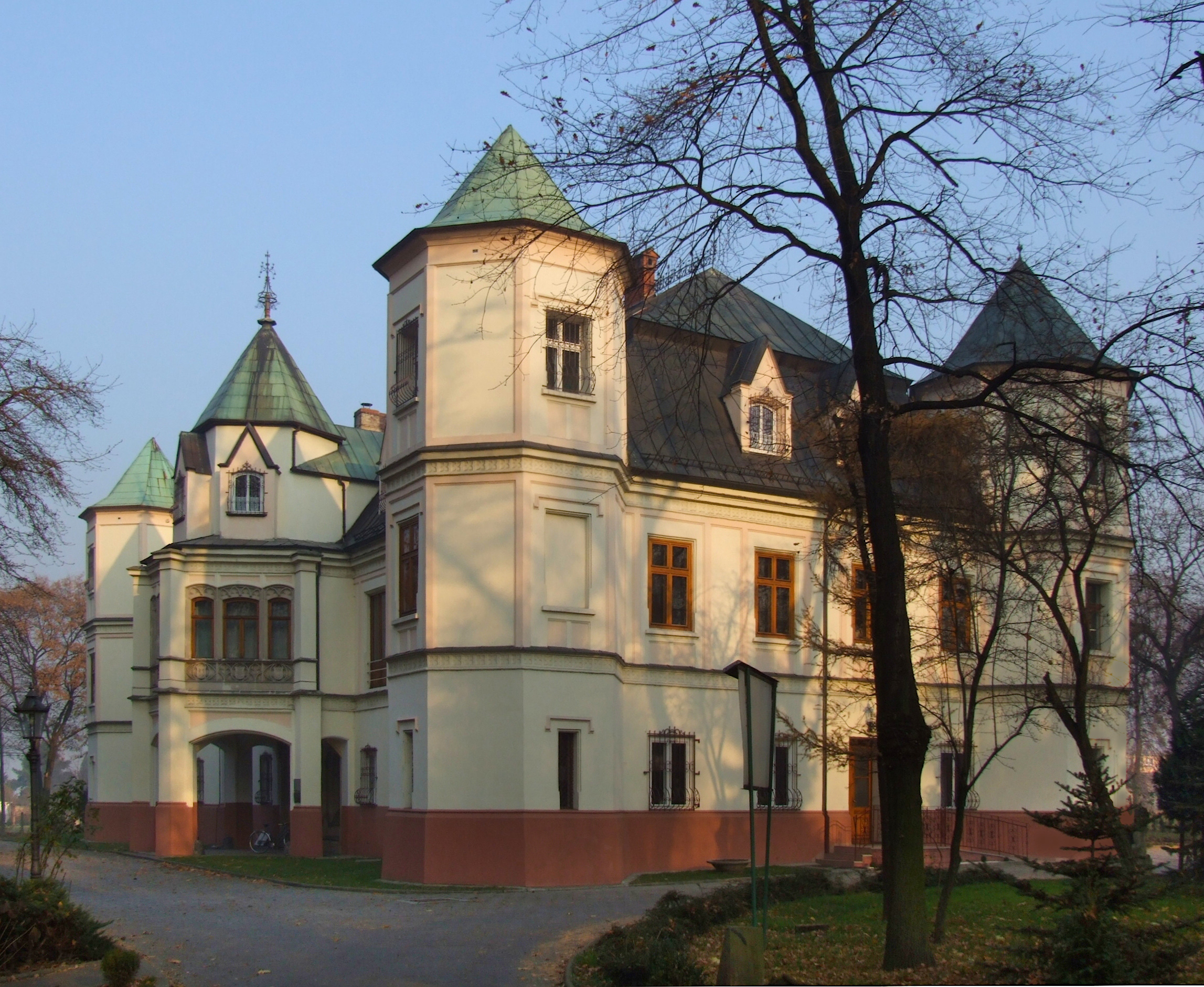
- Palace in Krzyżanowice

- Location within Poland
- Coordinates: 50°0′N 18°16′E
- Country: Poland
- Voivodeship: Silesian Voivodeship
- County: Racibórz
- Gmina: Krzyżanowice
- Population (approx.): 2,100

Krzyżanowice [kʂɨʐanɔˈvit͡sɛ] is a village in Racibórz County, Silesian Voivodeship, in southern Poland, close to the Czech border. It is the seat of the gmina (administrative district) called Gmina Krzyżanowice.

== Notable people ==
- Karl Max, Prince Lichnowsky (1860–1928) a German diplomat who served as Ambassador to Britain during the July Crisis in 1914
