= Gmina Krzyżanowice =

Gmina Krzyżanowice Krzyżanowice Commune
- Gmina
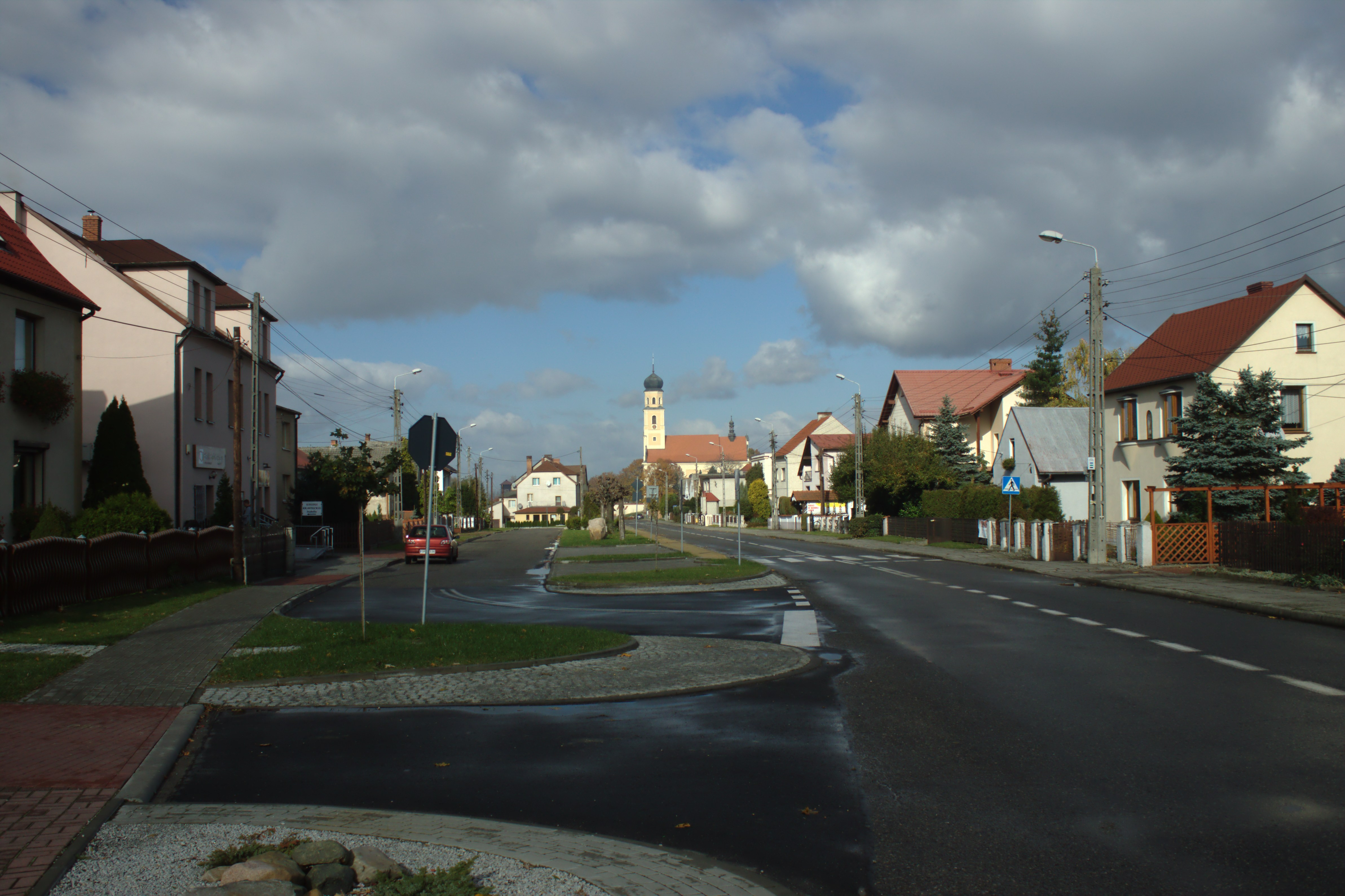
- Square in Tworków

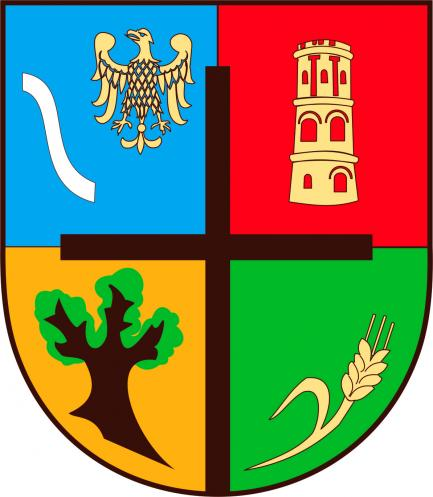
- Coat of arms
- Interactive map of Gmina Krzyżanowice
- Coordinates (Krzyżanowice): 50°0′N 18°16′E
- Country: Poland
- Voivodeship: Silesian
- County: Racibórz
- Seat: Krzyżanowice

Area
  - Total: 69.67 km^{2} (26.90 sq mi)

Population (2019-06-30)
  - Total: 11,301
  - Density: 162.2/km^{2} (420.1/sq mi)
- Website: http://www.krzyzanowice.pl

Gmina Krzyżanowice is a rural gmina (administrative district) in Racibórz County, Silesian Voivodeship, in southern Poland, on the Czech border. Its seat is the village of Krzyżanowice, which lies approximately 10 kilometres (6 mi) south of Racibórz and 60 km (37 mi) south-west of the regional capital Katowice.

The gmina covers an area of 69.67 square kilometres (26.9 sq mi), and as of 2019, its total population was 11,301.

== Villages ==
Gmina Krzyżanowice contains the villages and settlements of Bieńkowice, Bolesław, Chałupki, Krzyżanowice, Nowa Wioska, Owsiszcze, Roszków, Rudyszwałd, Tworków and Zabełków.

== Neighbouring gminas ==
Gmina Krzyżanowice is bordered by the town of Racibórz and by the gminas of Gorzyce, Krzanowice and Lubomia. It also borders the Czech Republic.

== Gallery ==
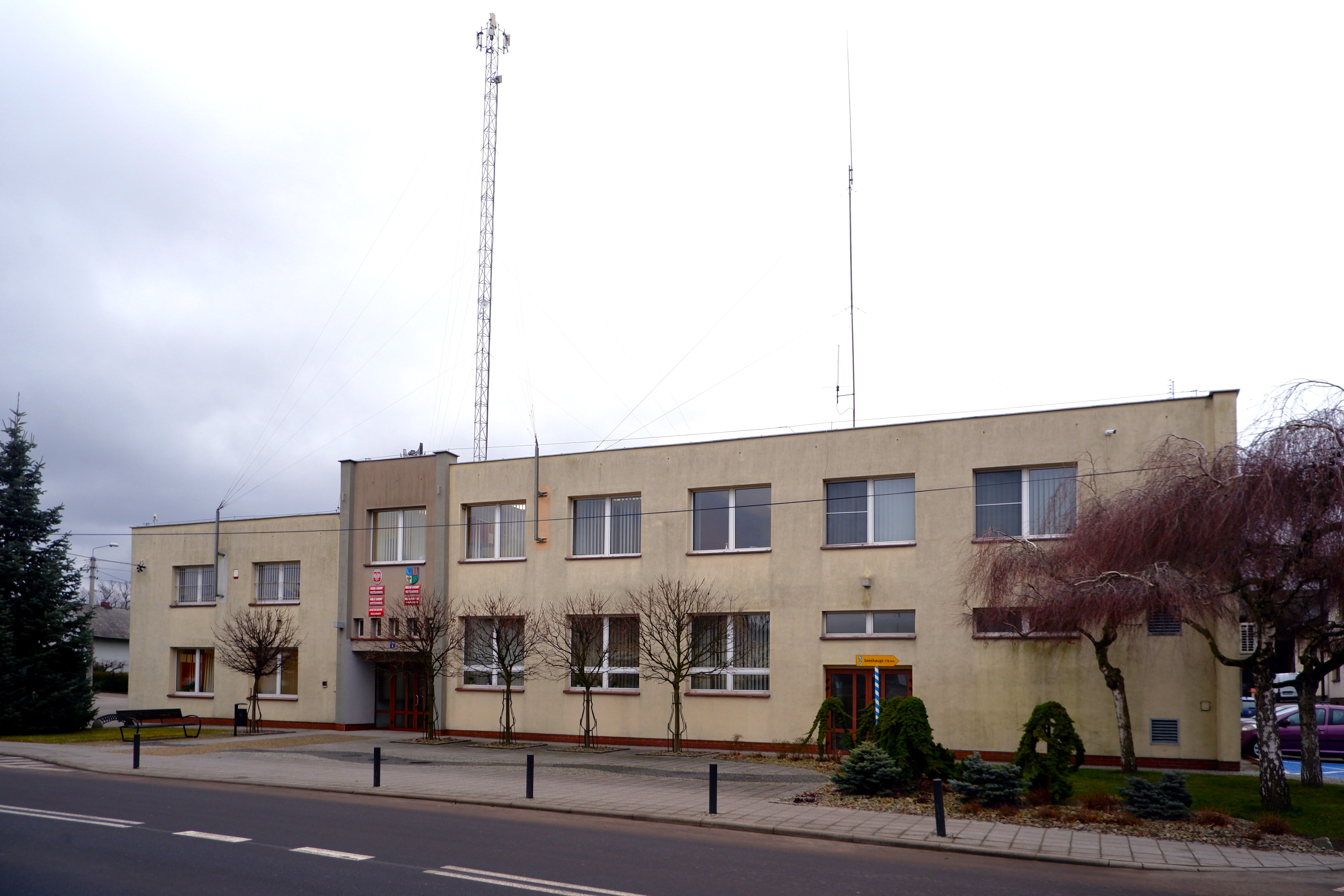
Municipal office

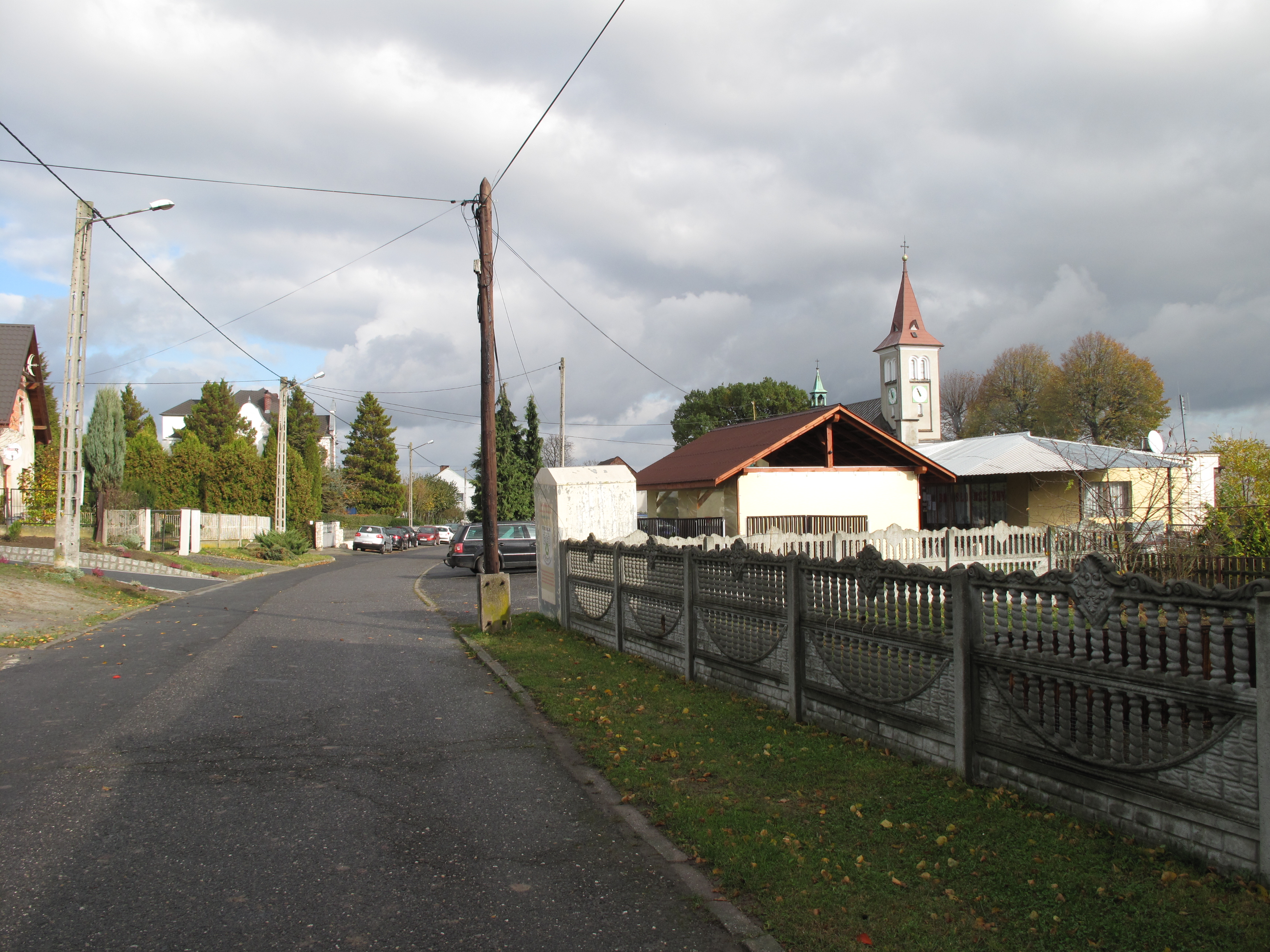
Street in Bolesław

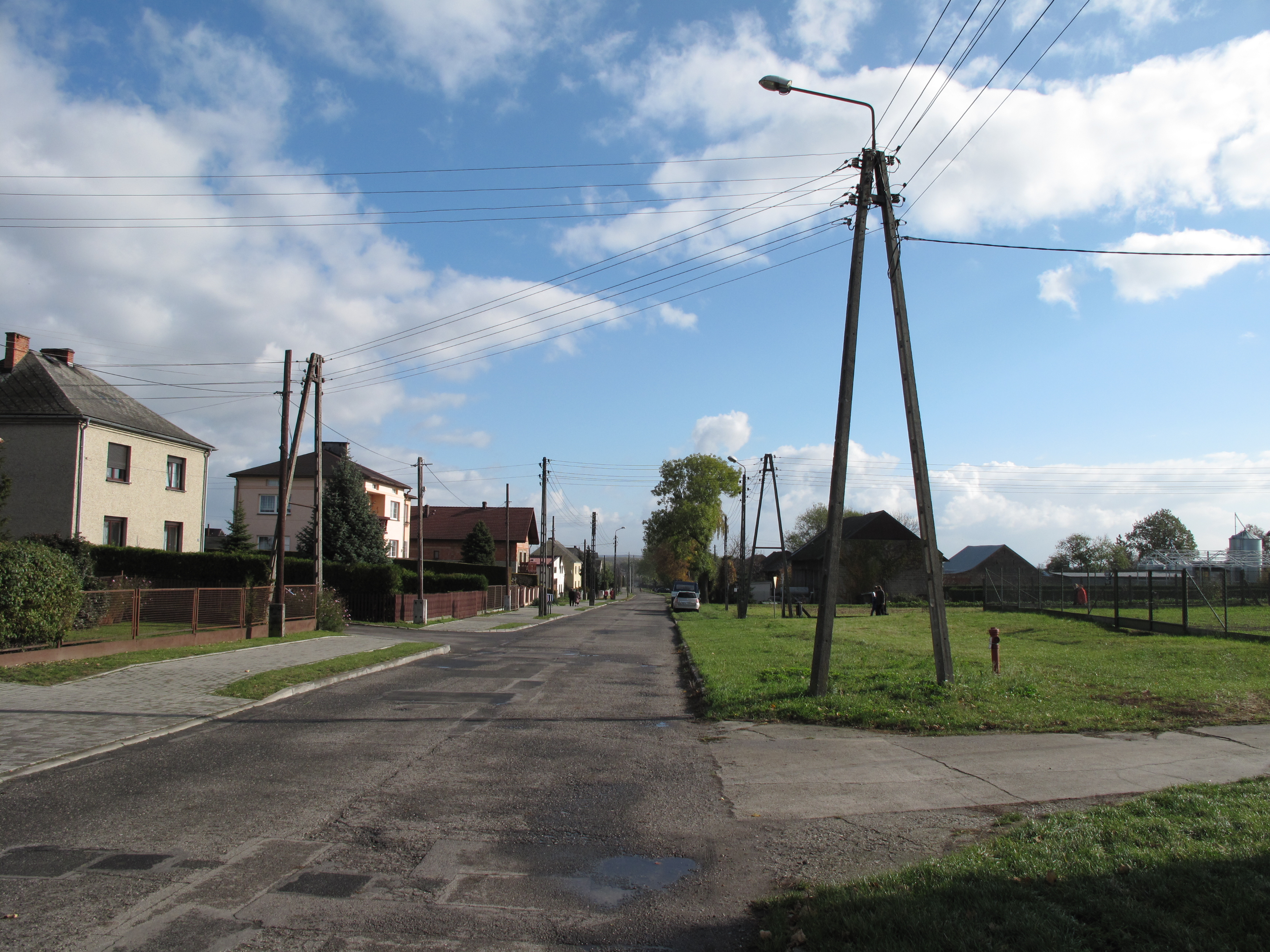
Street in Bieńkowice

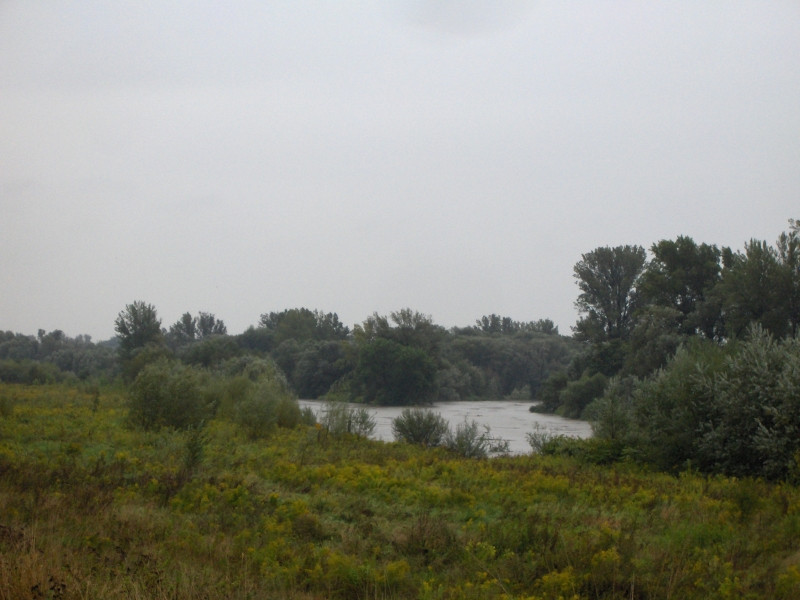
Odra River
