= Owsiszcze =

- Village
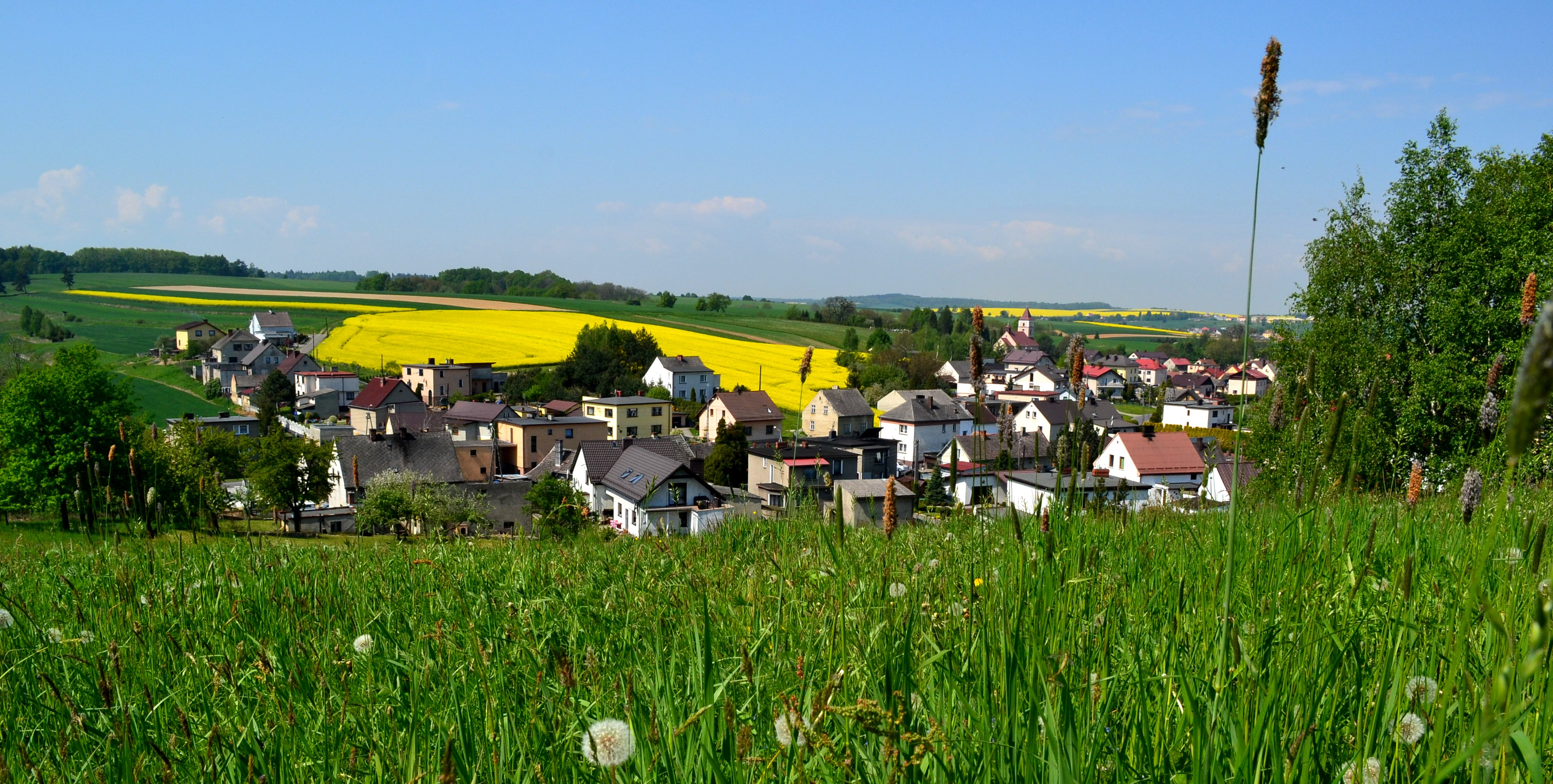
- Panorama of the village

- Location within Poland
- Coordinates: 49°59′N 18°14′E
- Country: Poland
- Voivodeship: Silesian Voivodeship
- County: Racibórz
- Gmina: Krzyżanowice

Population (approx.)
  - Total: 850

Owsiszcze [ɔfˈɕiʂt͡ʂɛ] is a village in the administrative district of Gmina Krzyżanowice, within Racibórz County, Silesian Voivodeship, in southern Poland, close to the Czech border.
