= Wodzisław Śląski railway station =

Railway station in Wodzisław Śląski, Poland

Wodzisław Śląski
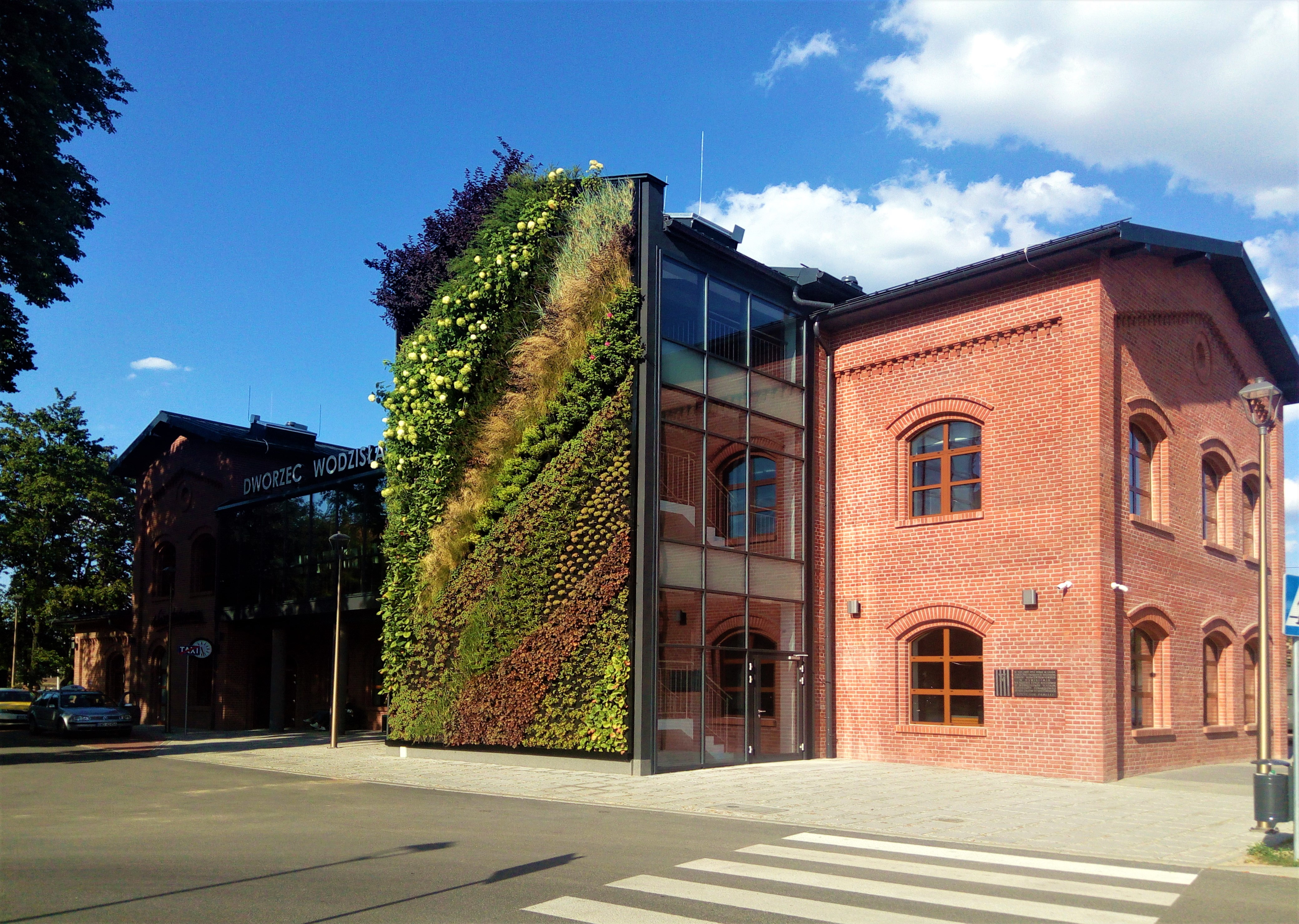

General information
- Location: str. Rybnicka 2a, Wodzisław County, Wodzisław Śląski, Silesian; Poland
- Coordinates: 50°00′28″N 18°28′35″E
- Owner: Polskie Koleje Państwowe S.A.
- Line: 158
- Platforms: 2
- Tracks: 3

Construction
- Structure type: Building: yes Water tower: yes

History
- Opened: 1882
- Former names: Loslau

Services
Preceding station	KŚ	Following station
Wodzisław Śląski Radlin towards Katowice	S71	Wodzisław Śląski Centrum towards Chałupki
Location

Wodzisław Śląski railway station is a railway station in Wodzisław Śląski, Poland.

The station opened in 1882. As of 2019, it is served by Silesian Railways, Polregio (local and regional services), Leo Express and PKP Intercity (international and intercity services). InterRegio and Silesian Railways services are on the line between Katowice and Bohumín also Kraków – Chałupki. PKP Intercity services are on the lines between Warsaw and Prague, Budapest, Graz, Gdynia, Przemyśl and Vienna. Leo Express services are on the line between Prague and Kraków.
