= Roszków, Silesian Voivodeship =

Roszków
- Village
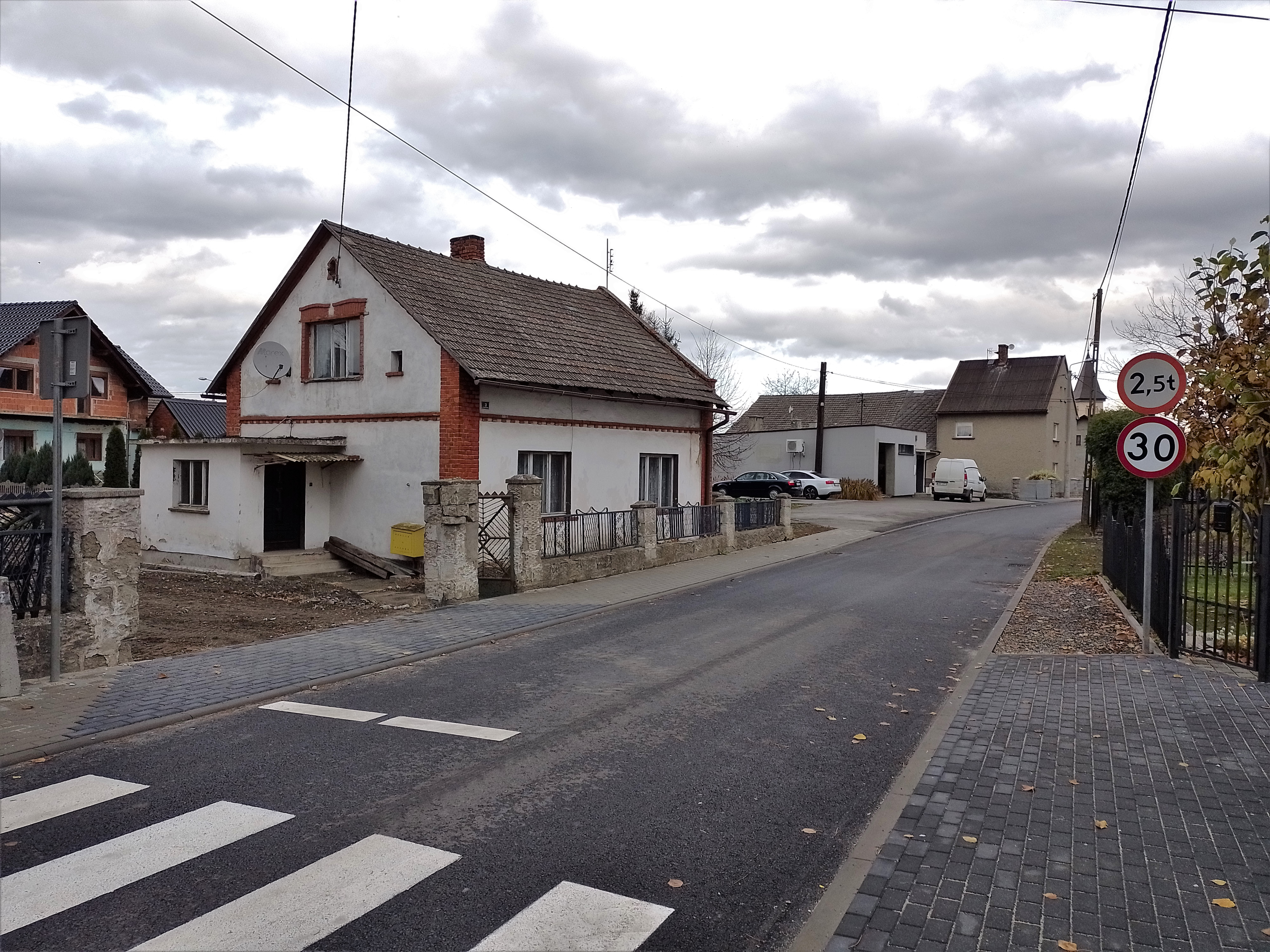

- Location within Poland
- Coordinates: 49°59′N 18°18′E
- Country: Poland
- Voivodeship: Silesian
- County: Racibórz
- Gmina: Krzyżanowice
- Population (approx.): 490

Roszków [ˈrɔʂkuf] is a village in the administrative district of Gmina Krzyżanowice, within Racibórz County, Silesian Voivodeship, in southern Poland, close to the Czech border.
