= Bieńkowice, Silesian Voivodeship =

Bieńkowice
- Village
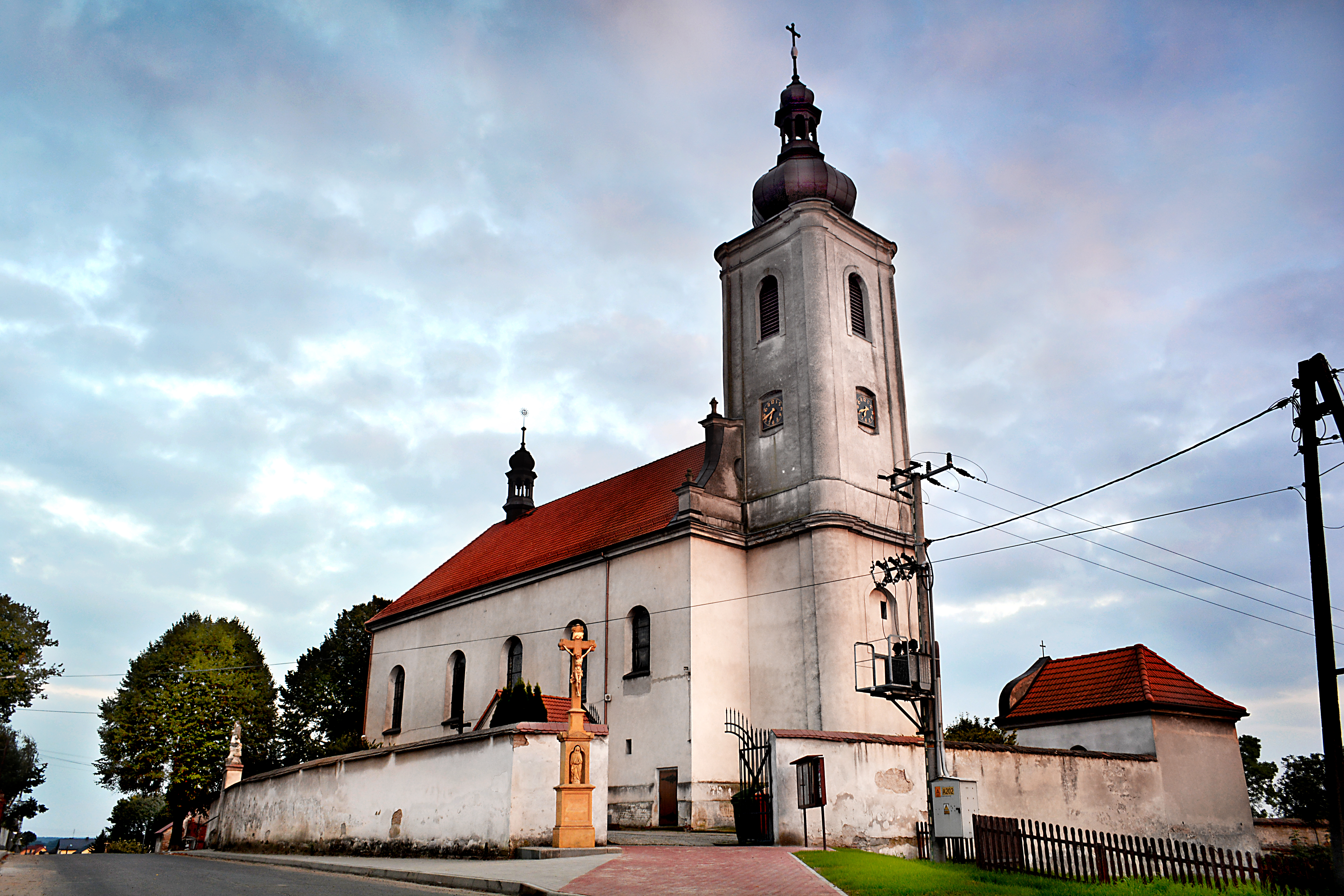
- All Saints church

- Location within Poland
- Coordinates: 50°2′N 18°13′E
- Country: Poland
- Voivodeship: Silesian Voivodeship
- County: Racibórz
- Gmina: Krzyżanowice
- Population: 1,200

Bieńkowice [bjɛɲkɔˈvit͡sɛ] is a village in the administrative district of Gmina Krzyżanowice, within Racibórz County, Silesian Voivodeship, in southern Poland, close to the Czech border.

== Gallery ==
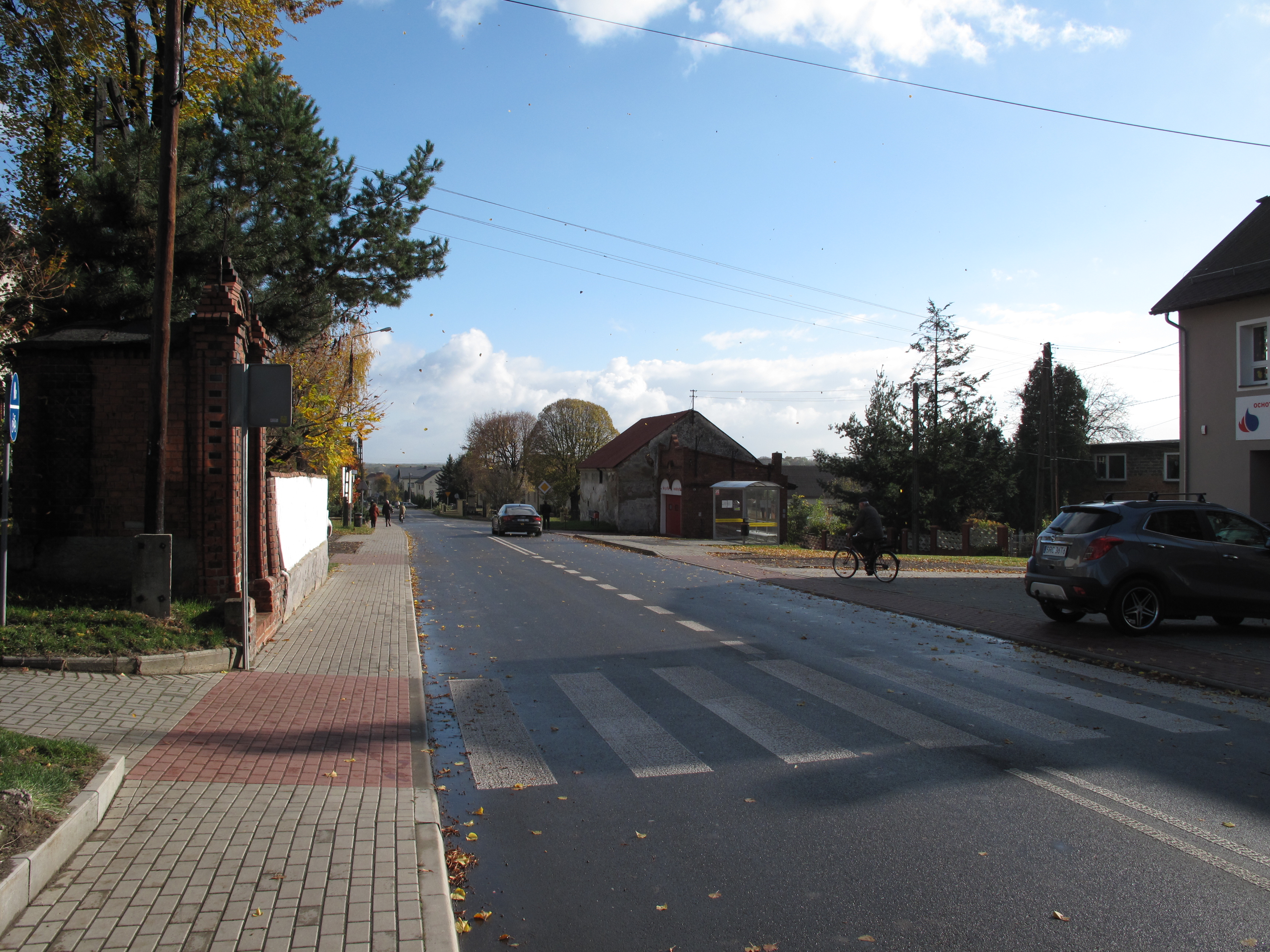
Main road

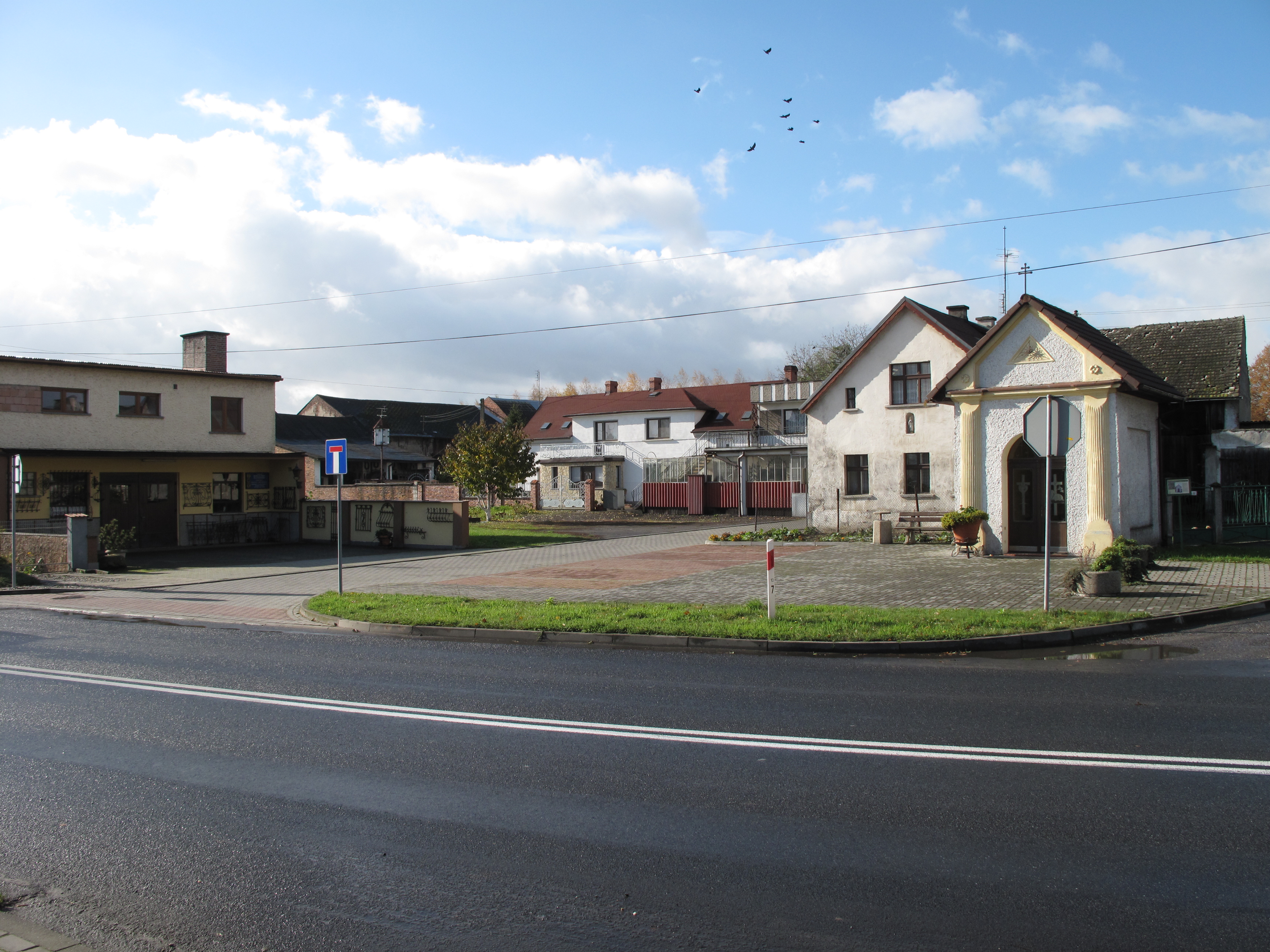
Chapell

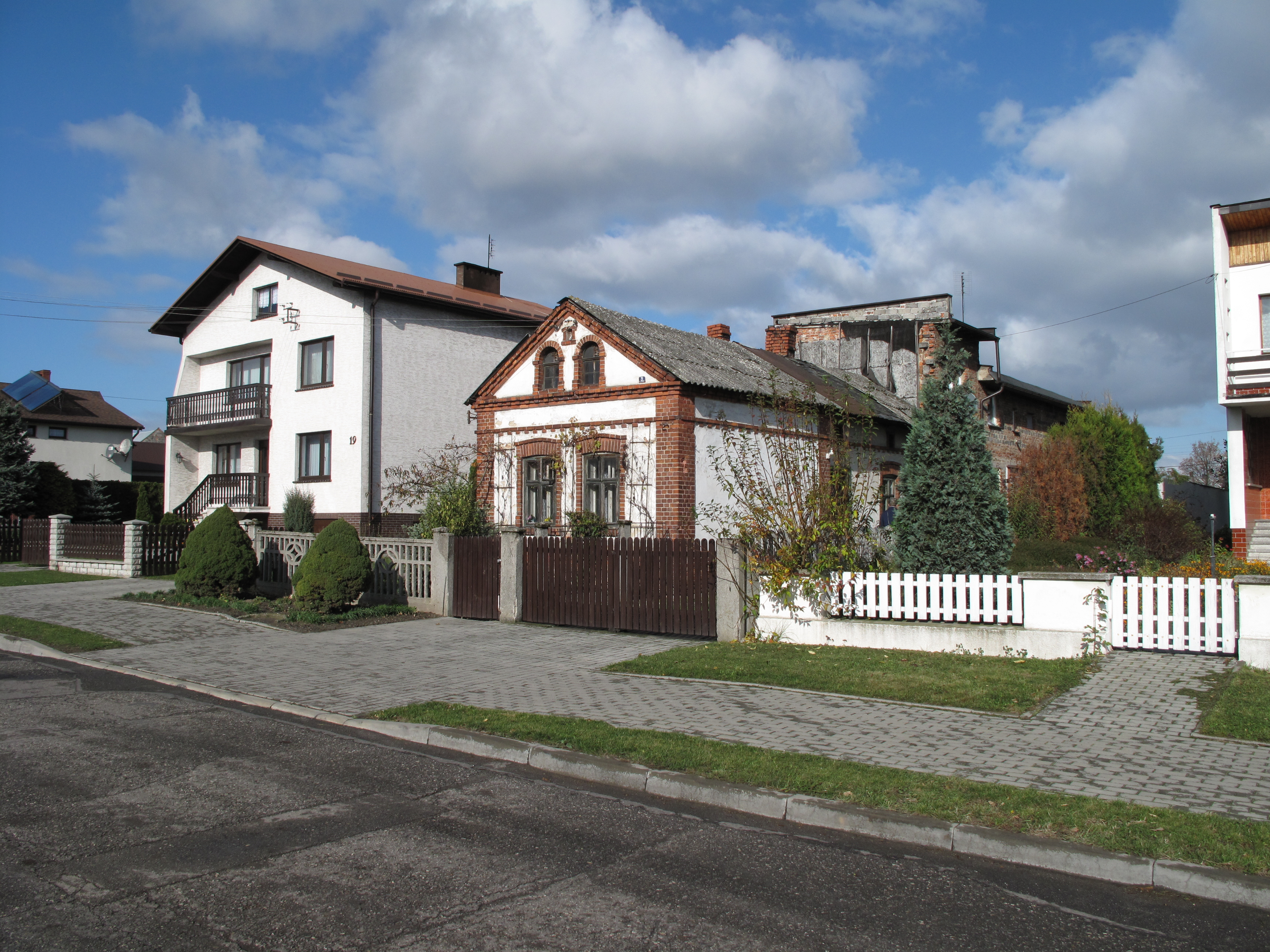
Houses
