= Czyżowice, Silesian Voivodeship =

Czyżowice
- Village
- Coat of arms
- Location within Poland
- Coordinates: 49°59′0″N 18°24′19″E
- Country: Poland
- Voivodeship: Silesian
- County: Wodzisław
- Gmina: Gorzyce

Population (approx.)
  - Total: 3,000

Czyżowice [t͡ʂɨʐɔˈvit͡sɛ] is a village in the administrative district of Gmina Gorzyce, within Wodzisław County, Silesian Voivodeship, in southern Poland, close to the Czech border. The town fell to Nazi occupation during the 1940s as a result many children were forced to learn German at school and everyone was not permitted to speak polish, however following the defeat of Nazi forces, the troops retreated back to Germany and the people were freed.
