= Rudyszwałd =

- Village
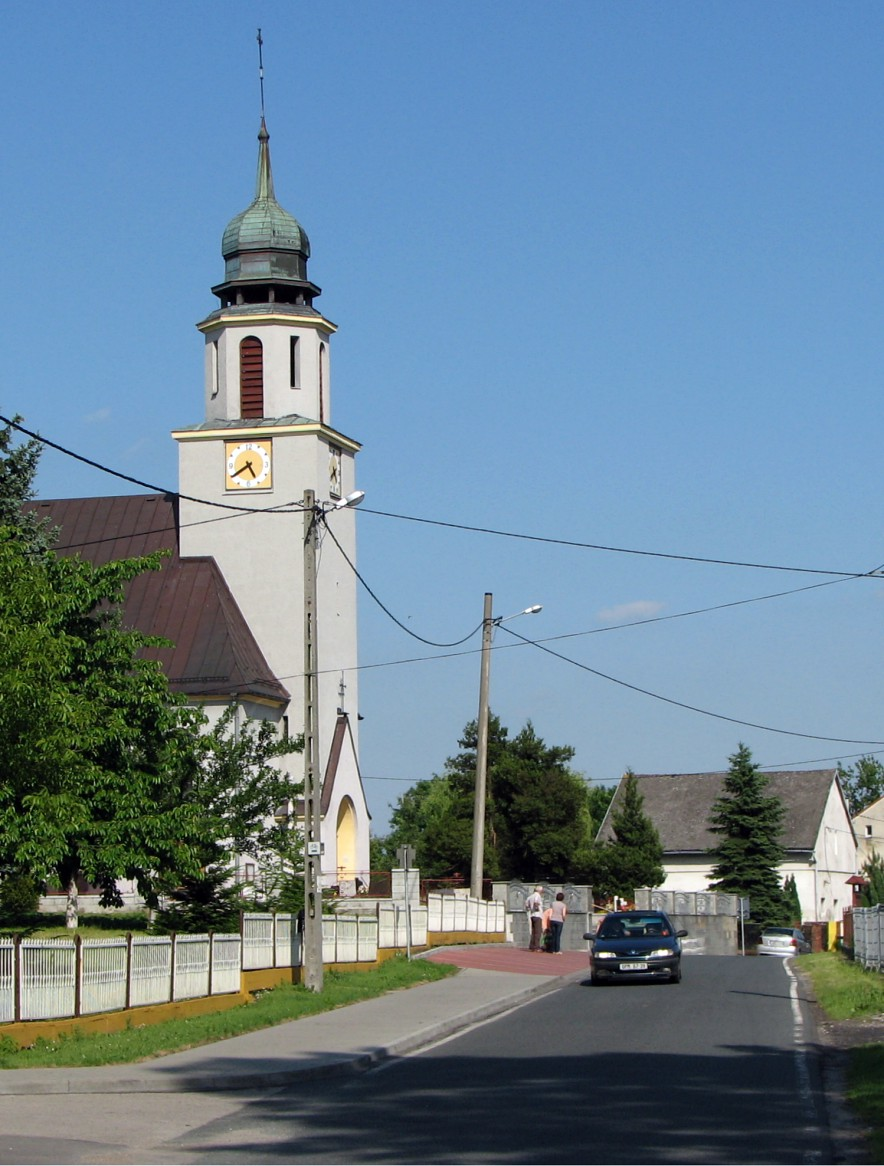

- Location within Poland
- Coordinates: 49°57′N 18°17′E
- Country: Poland
- Voivodeship: Silesian
- County: Racibórz
- Gmina: Krzyżanowice
- First mentioned: 1305
- Elevation: 200 m (660 ft)
- Population (approx.): 790

Rudyszwałd [ruˈdɨʂfau̯t] is a village in the administrative district of Gmina Krzyżanowice, within Racibórz County, Silesian Voivodeship, in southern Poland, close to the Czech border.

The village was first mentioned in a Latin document of Diocese of Wrocław called Liber fundationis episcopatus Vratislaviensis from around 1305 as item in Rudolfwald debent esse XXIII) mansi. The name, Rudolph plus wald (German: a wood), indicates ethnically German settlement.
