= Chałupki, Racibórz County =

Chałupki
- Village
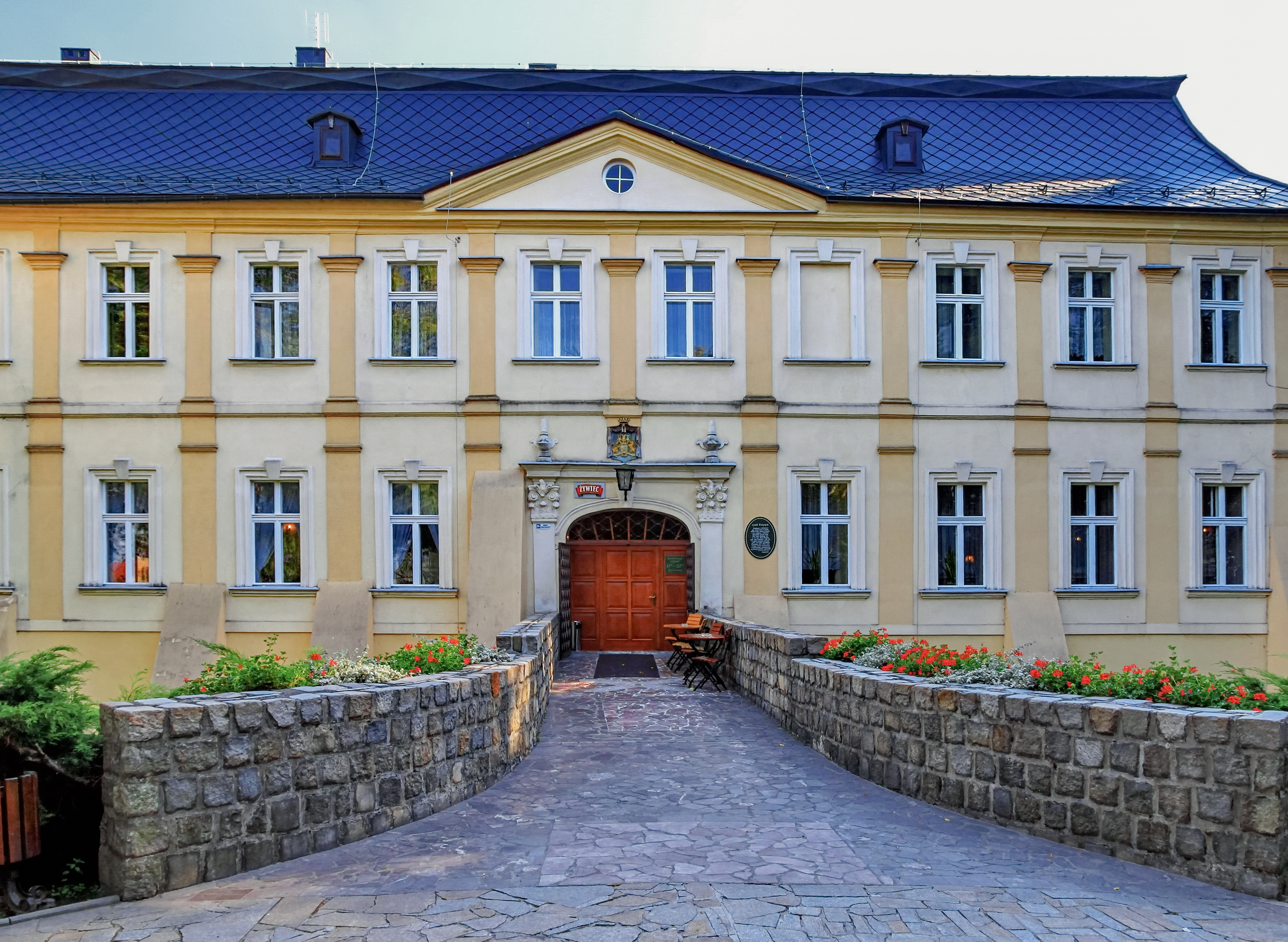
- Palace

- Location within Poland
- Coordinates: 49°55′28″N 18°19′6″E
- Country: Poland
- Voivodeship: Silesian
- County: Racibórz
- Gmina: Krzyżanowice
- First mentioned: 1373

Government
  - Mayor: Ryszard Chrobok

Population (2015)
  - Total: 725
- Time zone: UTC+1 (CET)
  - Summer (DST): UTC+2 (CEST)
- Postal code: 47-460
- Car plates: SRC

Chałupki [xaˈwupki] is a village in Racibórz County, Silesian Voivodeship, Poland. Its total area is .777 km^{2} (0.300 sq mi).

It lies on the border with Czech Republic, on the Chałupki - Bohumín railway line.
