= Żerdziny =

Żerdziny may refer to:

- Żerdziny, Silesian Voivodeship, Poland
- Żerdziny, Warmian-Masurian Voivodeship, Poland
