= Maksymilian Krybus =

Polish doctor (1894–1970)

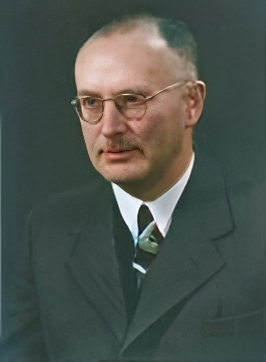
- Krybus c. 1927/28
- Born: 13 August 1894; Mohn, German Empire
- Died: 22 January 1970 (aged 75); Książ Wielkopolski, Poland
- Burial place: Książ Wielkopolski Cemetery
- Occupation: Doctor
- Children: Jerzy Franciszek Krybus
- Parents: Francis Krybus (father); Joanna Wałach (mother)
- Relatives: 3

Maksymillian Krybus (Polish pronunciation: [maksɨˈmiljan ˈkrɨbus]; 13 August 1894 – 22 January 1970) was a Polish doctor who saved the lives of thousands of people during WW2 in Pfedbors and Tarnau.

== Early life ==
Krybus was born on 13 August 1894 in Maków into a farming family of Franciszek and Joanna née Wałach. After graduating from high school he studied at a theological seminary for two years, which was interrupted by warfare.

=== World War I ===
In 1915, as a Prussian serf, he was conscripted into the army. From 1916 until 1918, he fought on the Western Front, where in the last year of the war he was wounded in the neck and thigh. After the war ended, he was demobilized.

=== Studying era ===
In the early 1920s, he began studying medicine at the renowned universities of the time, the Ludwig-Maximilians-Universität München, Heidelberg University, and the University of Breslau. After passing the medical examination at the Ludwig-Maximilians-Universität München in 1922, after completing a year of internship, he was promoted on 24 May 1923 by the Bavarian Ministry Of The Interior Sport and Integration to doctor of medicine with the degree cum laude and was allowed to practice in Germany. As an assistant physician, he worked from April 1924 to June 1925 in a sanatorium for pulmonary patients in Kowanówko. At the same time, he was studying at the Faculty of Medicine of the University of Poznań, where on 22 April 1925, he received a doctorate in all medical sciences.

== Military service ==
Lieutenant Krybus in a Military suit c. 1931

Krybus was trained as a military doctor from August to September 1928 in the 17th Infantry Regiment as second lieutenant. In 1939, he became a reserve lieutenant. In this rank he was mobilized on 24 August 1939 to the 7th Infantry Division in Poznań, and on 26 August, he was transferred to a military unit in Chełm.

== Later life ==
=== World War II ===
Shortly after the outbreak of WW2 on 1 September 1939, he was kept in German captivity together with the military hospital. In December, Krybus's family was displaced from Książ and temporarily stayed in Warsaw. They were soon joined by Krybus, who had been released from captivity that time. In January 1940 he moved to work in Pfedbors. Namely, after the city burned down by 65% during the war in September. the housing situation was dramatic. Against this background, ensuring acceptable sanitary conditions and basic medical care, especially for women in labour, became a huge problem. The city council therefore took the initiative to open a maternity ward. The Maternity Care Point, properly furnished and equipped, was opened at the beginning of November 1939 in 3 rooms of the newly built forester Lesiak's house on Kielecka Street. After the ceremonial opening, a swastika flag was hung on the house as a symbol of the new "German order". Medical care was initially provided by Dr Leopold Rotocki, who was later joined by Krybus. When in April 1940 the Germans displaced the Jews of the city to the ghetto, at that moment the doctor obtained better accommodation on Pocztowa Street and was able to bring his family. ==

According to Zbigniew Dobrzyński: He took a Jewish family into their apartment, and they stayed with them for a long time. They were placed in the basement, which was located under the kitchen floor. Since there was a large unit of our partisans in these areas, fearing that someone would inform on them, they took this family away from them and placed them in a safer place.

=== War struggle ===
In 1941, the number of births in Pfedbors dropped to 2–3 per month, which significantly increased the costs of maintaining the Maternity Care Point and it was dissolved in June. In addition to working at the Point, Krybus also ran a private practice in Pfedbors. At that time, the Germans, fearing infectious diseases, ordered Poles in the General Government to carry out disinfection and vaccinations against typhus. Following the order of the Germans, the Poles formed sanitary units which carried out this order. One of the organizers of the sanitary units was Krybus. In March 1941, he participated in a supplementary course on infectious diseases organized by the National Institute Of Hygiene in Warsaw.

In the autumn of 1941, Dr. Krybus was offered a job in Tarnau. Together with his stepson Zbigniew Dobrzyński, he moved to this city in October 1941. He left his family in Pfedbors, not wanting to expose them to danger. In the Tarnau district, epidemics broke out: typhus and dysentery. Krybus organized a sanitary column in this area - he saved the lives of many people. When in January 1945 the German army withdrew from Polish lands, Dr. Krybus worked as a district doctor in Tarnau from 19 January to 21 February 1945. Krybus returned to Książ on 5 March 1945. Together with his family, he once again settled in the house at ul. Bolesława Pierackiego 17 where he spent the rest of his life in.

== Death ==
Krybus died on 22 January 1970 in Książ Wielkopolski and was buried in the local cemetery. He was undoubtedly the most outstanding figure of pre-war and post-war Książ. Several years after Krybus's death, remembering his merits, the National Council of the City and Commune in Książ adopted Resolution No. II/9/78 of 29 March 1978 on naming a newly marked street in Książ after Maksymilian Krybus, and on 4 October 2005 a ceremony was held to name the Junior High School in Książ after Maksymilian Krybus. A commemorative plaque dedicated to him was also unveiled there.

== Personal life ==
Krybus was married to widow Adela Dobrzyńska, née Szlegel they got engaged in 1926, and had a child together called Jerzy. He was also the stepfather of, three stepchildren (Note: Zbigniew (1917–?) Irena (1919–2003), and Barbara (1922–1996)). They soon came to Książ Wielkopolski and settled there permanently.
