= Kornice, Poland =

Kornice
- Village
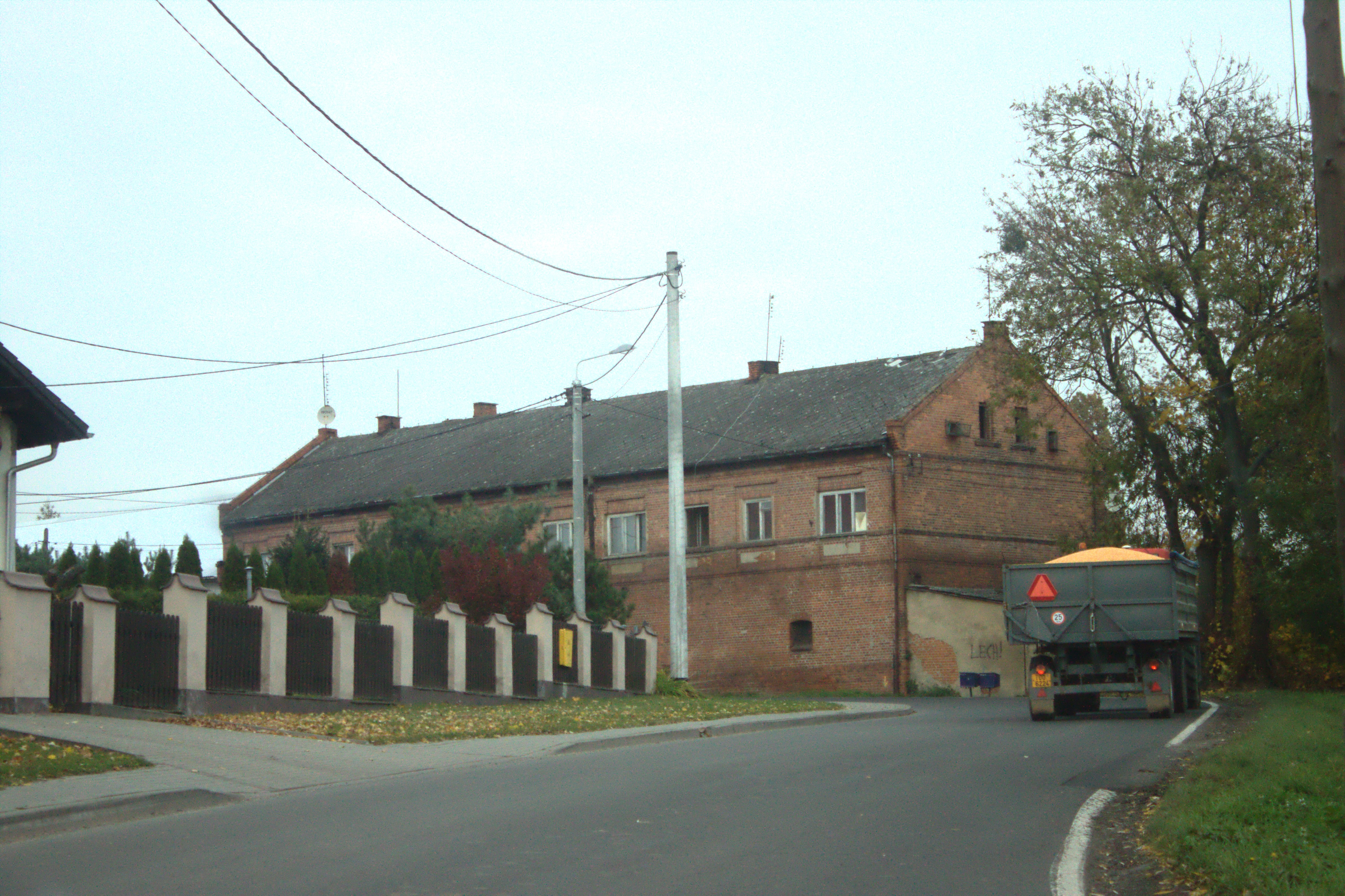

- Location within Poland
- Coordinates: 50°5′25″N 18°6′45″E
- Country: Poland
- Voivodeship: Silesian
- County: Racibórz
- Gmina: Pietrowice Wielkie
- Population: 370

Kornice ([kɔrˈnit͡sɛ]; German: Kornitz) is a village in the administrative district of Gmina Pietrowice Wielkie, within Racibórz County, Silesian Voivodeship, in southern Poland, close to the Czech border. In Kornice located is headquarter and one of windows factory of the Eko-Okna.
