= Amandów =

- Village
- Location within Poland
- Coordinates: 50°9′N 18°4′E
- Country: Poland
- Voivodeship: Silesian
- County: Racibórz
- Gmina: Pietrowice Wielkie
- Population: 160

Amandów ([aˈmanduf]; German: Amandhof) is a village in the administrative district of Gmina Pietrowice Wielkie, within Racibórz County, Silesian Voivodeship, in southern Poland, close to the Czech border.
