= Lekartów =

- Small town
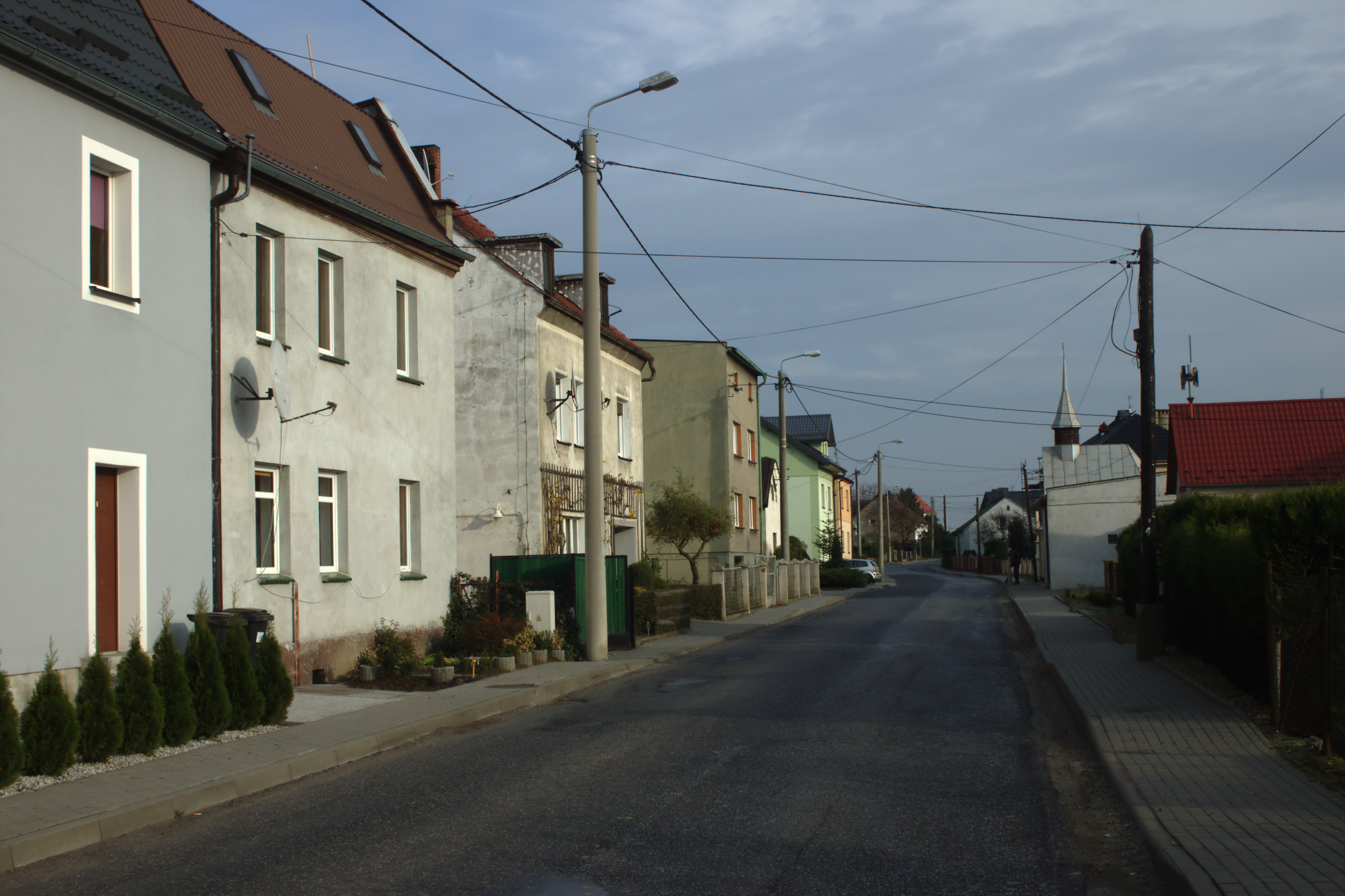
- Street

- Location within Poland
- Coordinates: 50°4′N 18°8′E
- Country: Poland
- Voivodeship: Silesian
- County: Racibórz
- Gmina: Pietrowice Wielkie
- Population: 280

Lekartów ([lɛˈkartuf]; German: Lekartow, 1936–1945 Mettich) is a village in the administrative district of Gmina Pietrowice Wielkie, within Racibórz County, Silesian Voivodeship, in southern Poland, close to the Czech border.

== Gallery ==
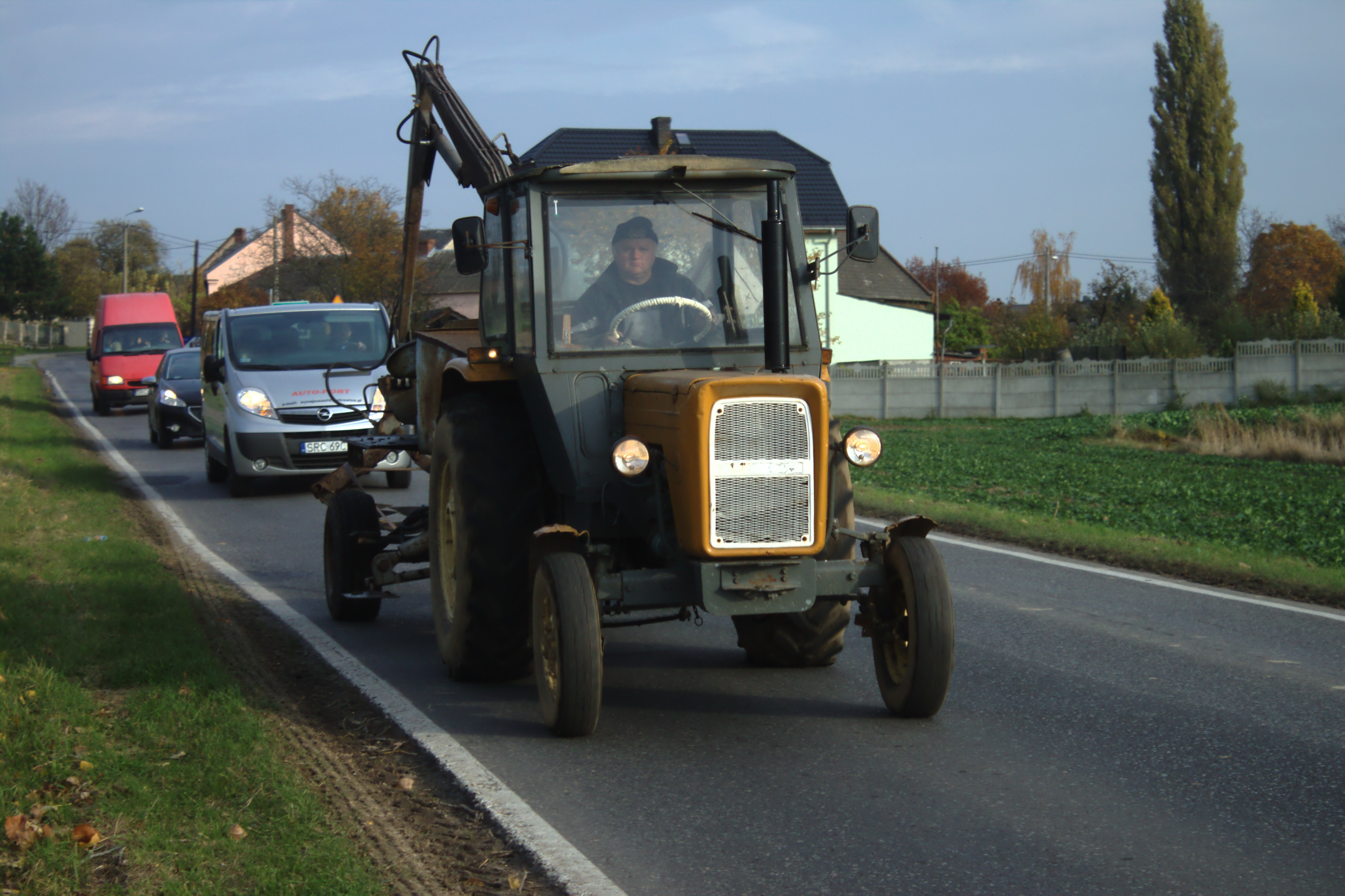
Tractor and his driver

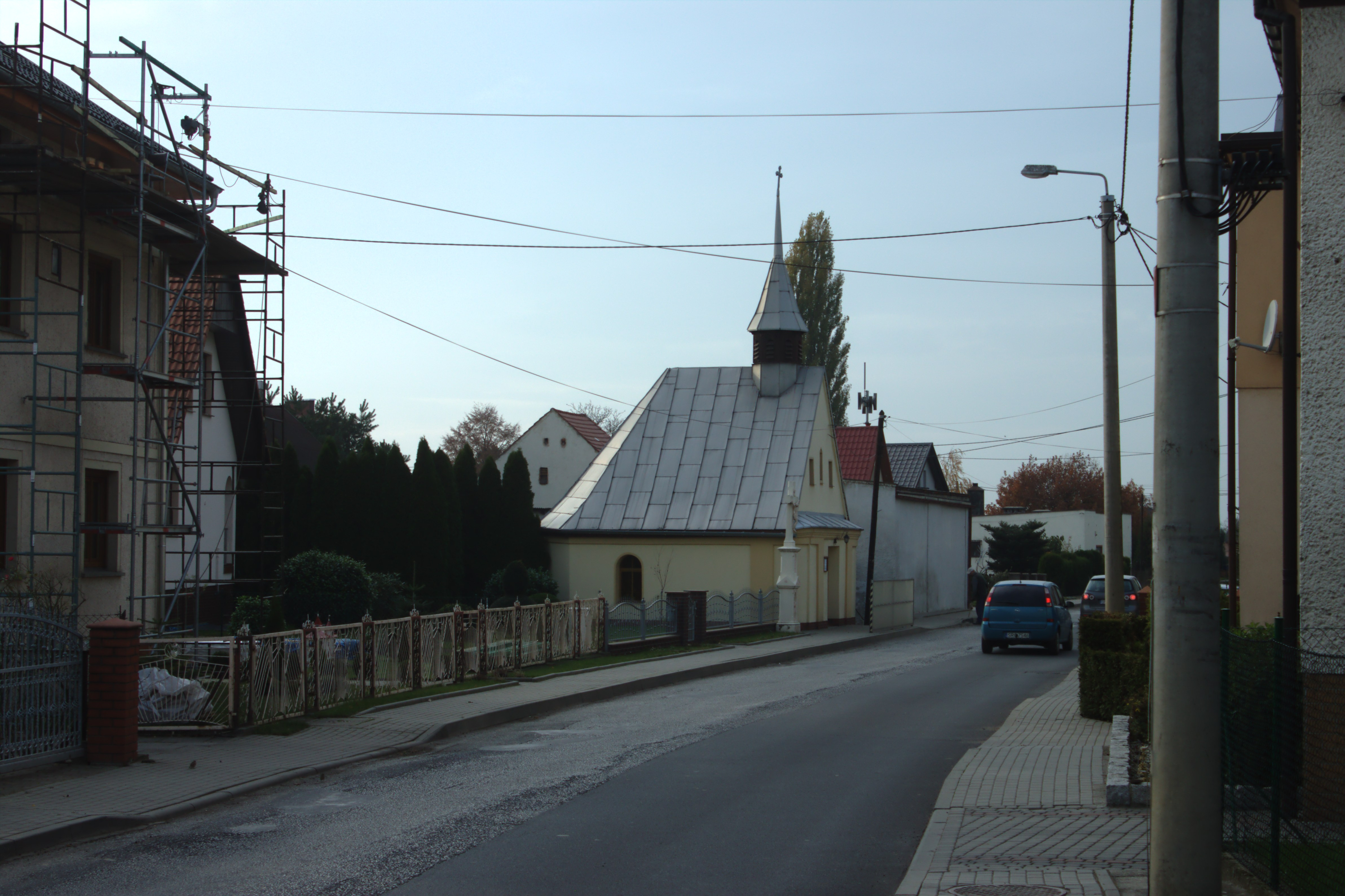
Village chapell

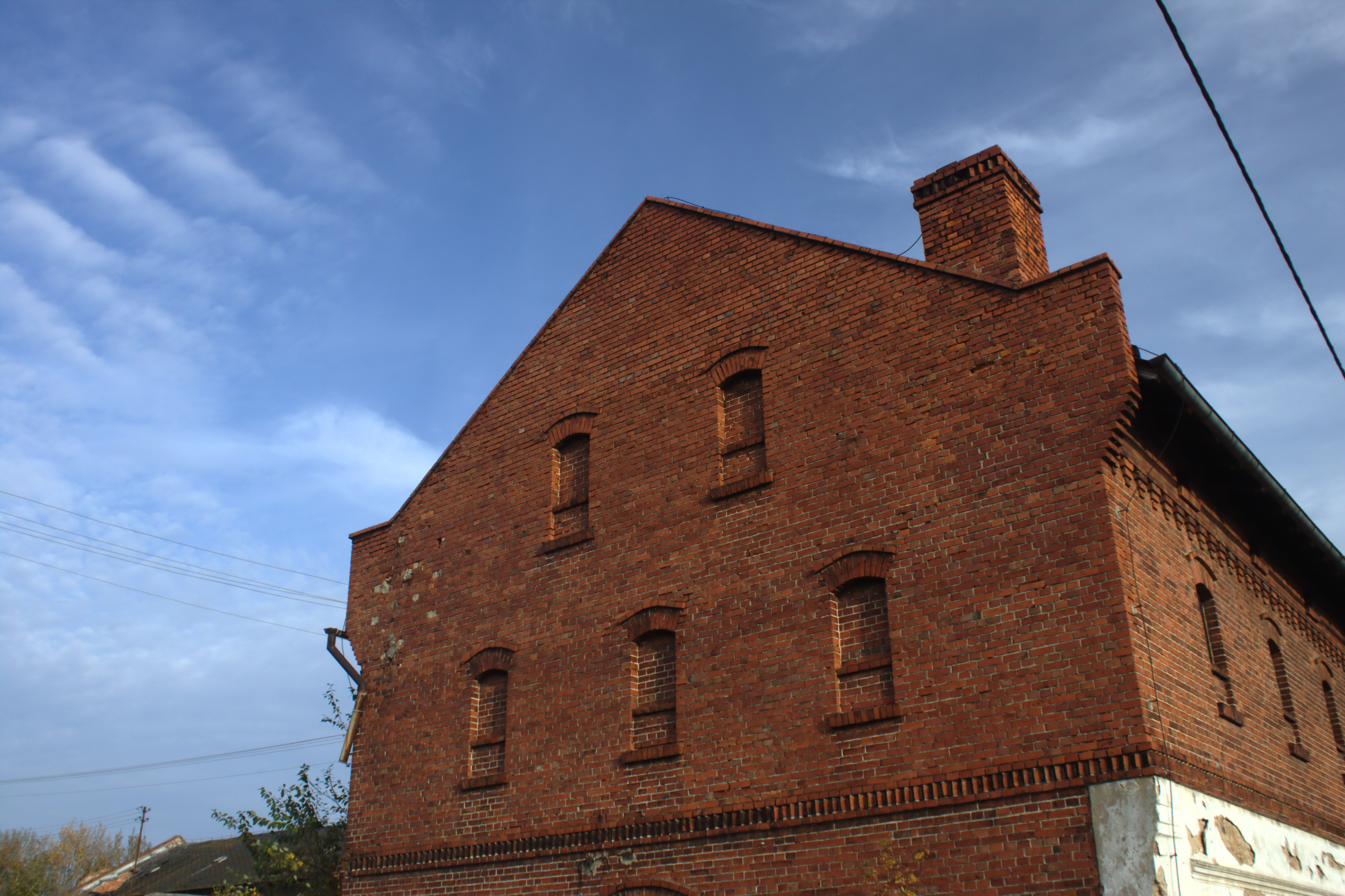
Brick house
