= Gródczanki =

- Village
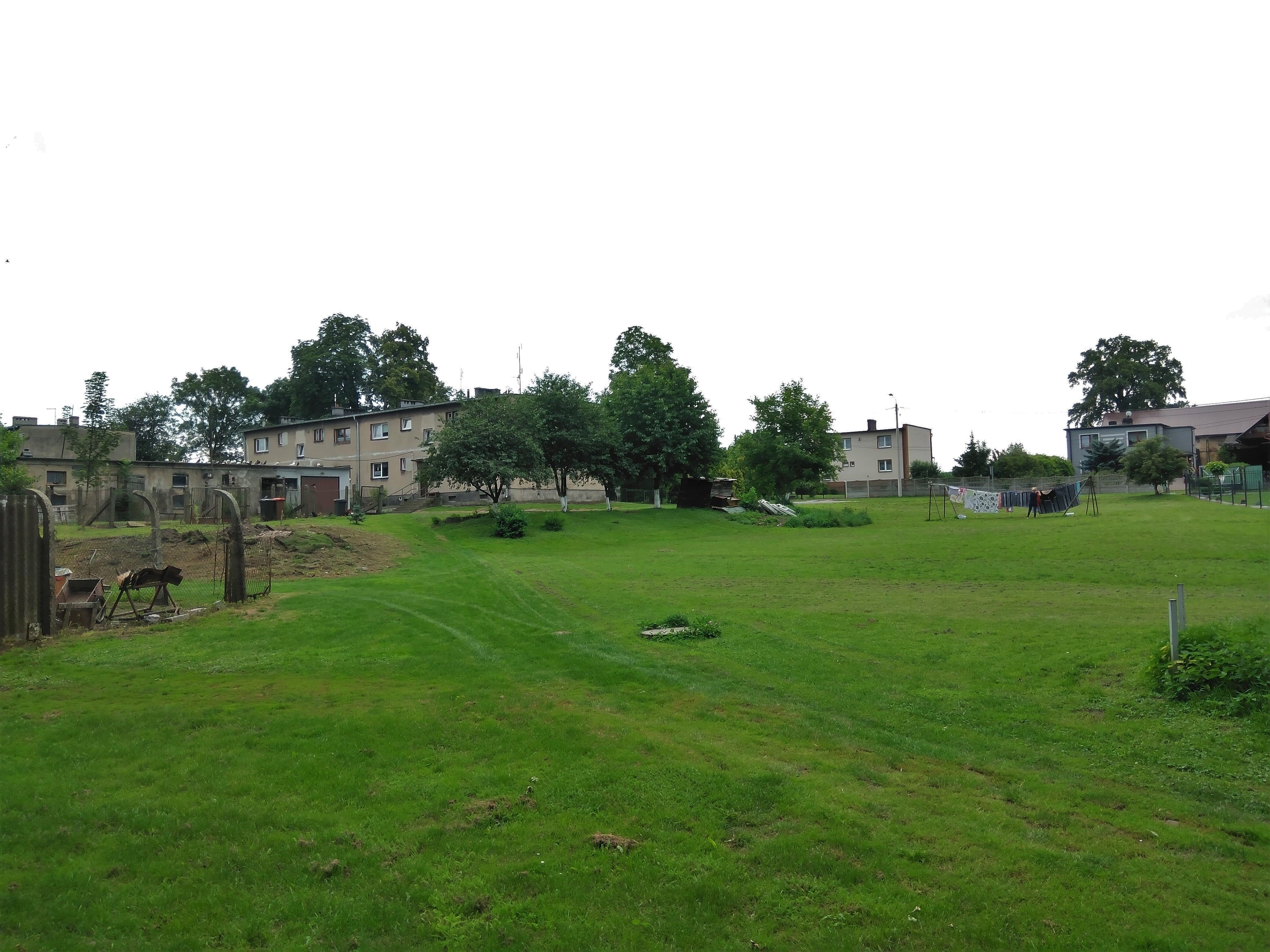

- Location within Poland
- Coordinates: 50°4′N 18°3′E
- Country: Poland
- Voivodeship: Silesian
- County: Racibórz
- Gmina: Pietrowice Wielkie
- Population: 230

Gródczanki ([ɡrutˈt͡ʂanki]; German: Ratsch) is a village in the administrative district of Gmina Pietrowice Wielkie, within Racibórz County, Silesian Voivodeship, in southern Poland, close to the Czech border.
