= Pietrowice Wielkie =

- Village
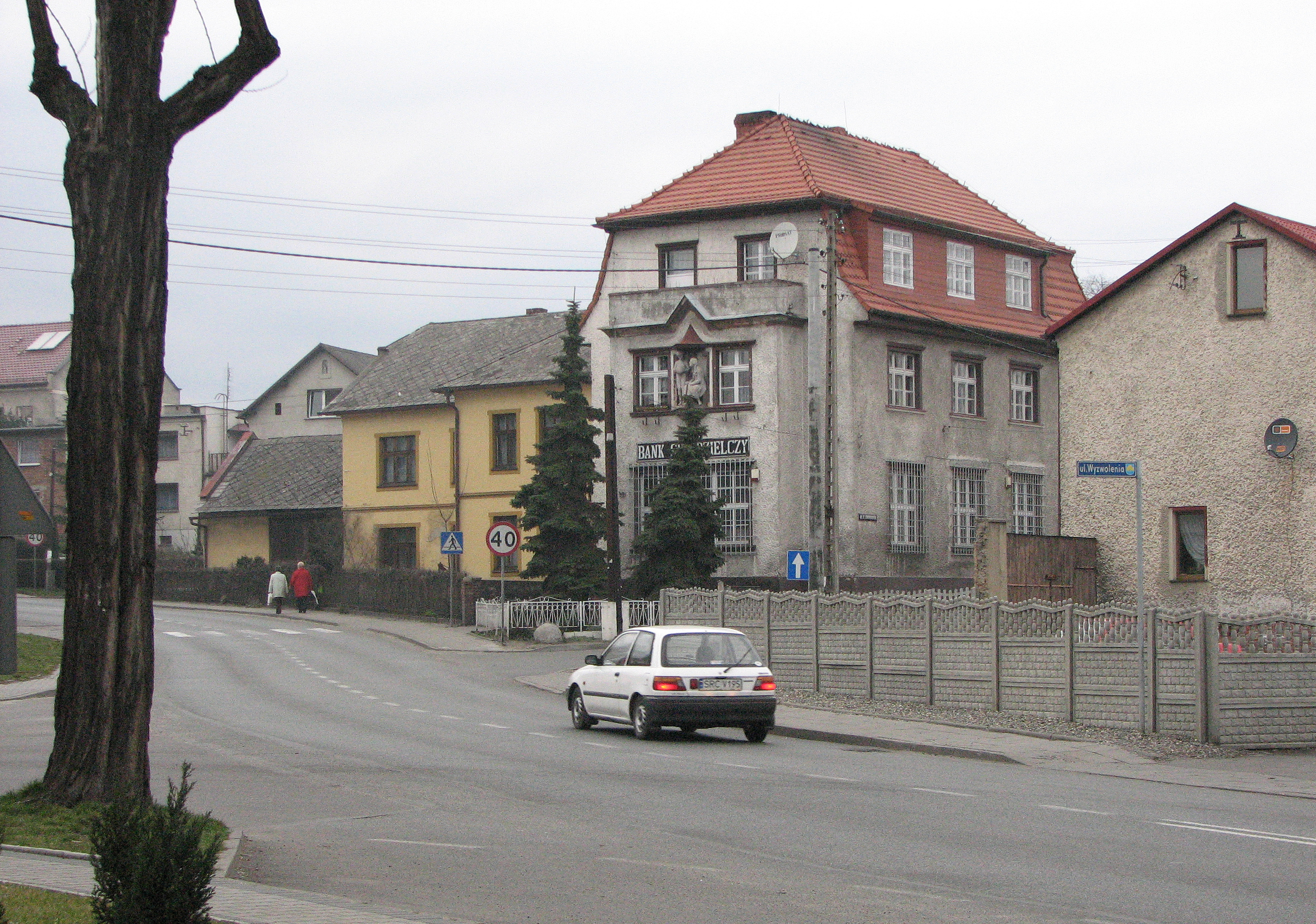
- A road through the village

- Location within Poland
- Coordinates: 50°5′N 18°5′E
- Country: Poland
- Voivodeship: Silesian
- County: Racibórz
- Gmina: Pietrowice Wielkie
- Population: 2,400

Pietrowice Wielkie ([pjɛtrɔˈvit͡sɛ ˈvjɛlkʲɛ], German: Groß Peterwitz) is a village in Racibórz County, Silesian Voivodeship, in southern Poland, close to the Czech border. It is the seat of the gmina (administrative district) called Gmina Pietrowice Wielkie.

== Gallery ==
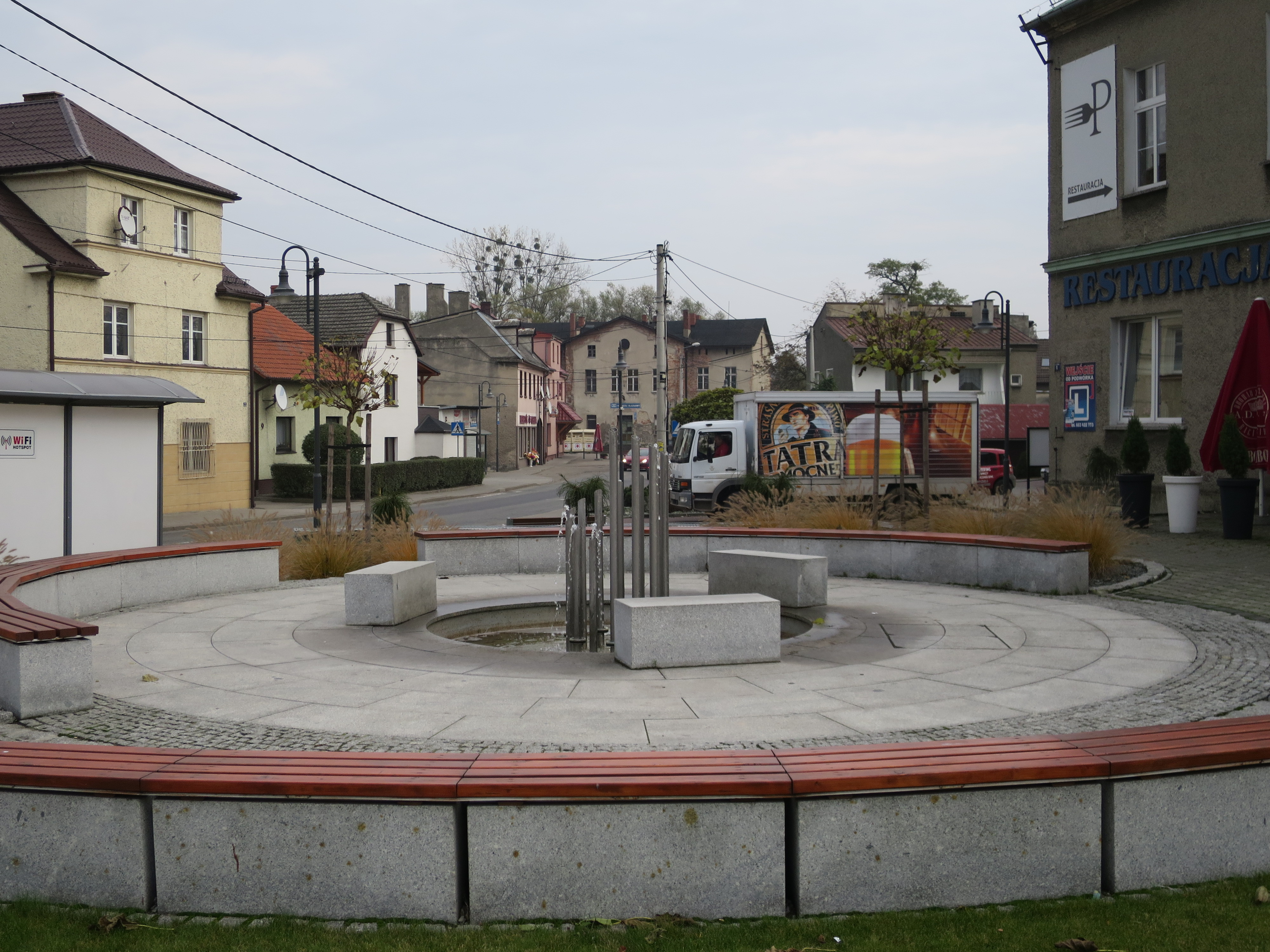
Center

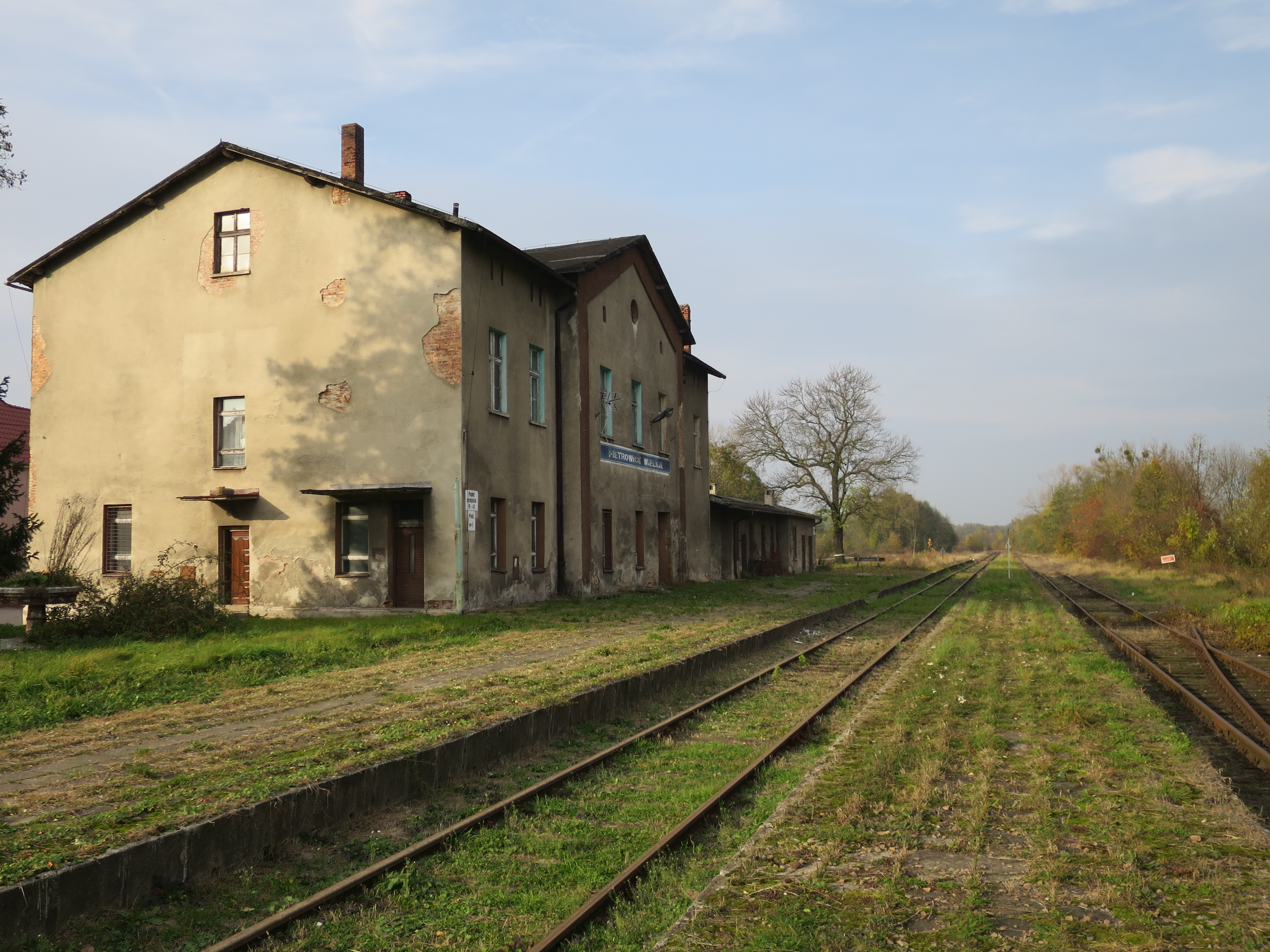
Former train station

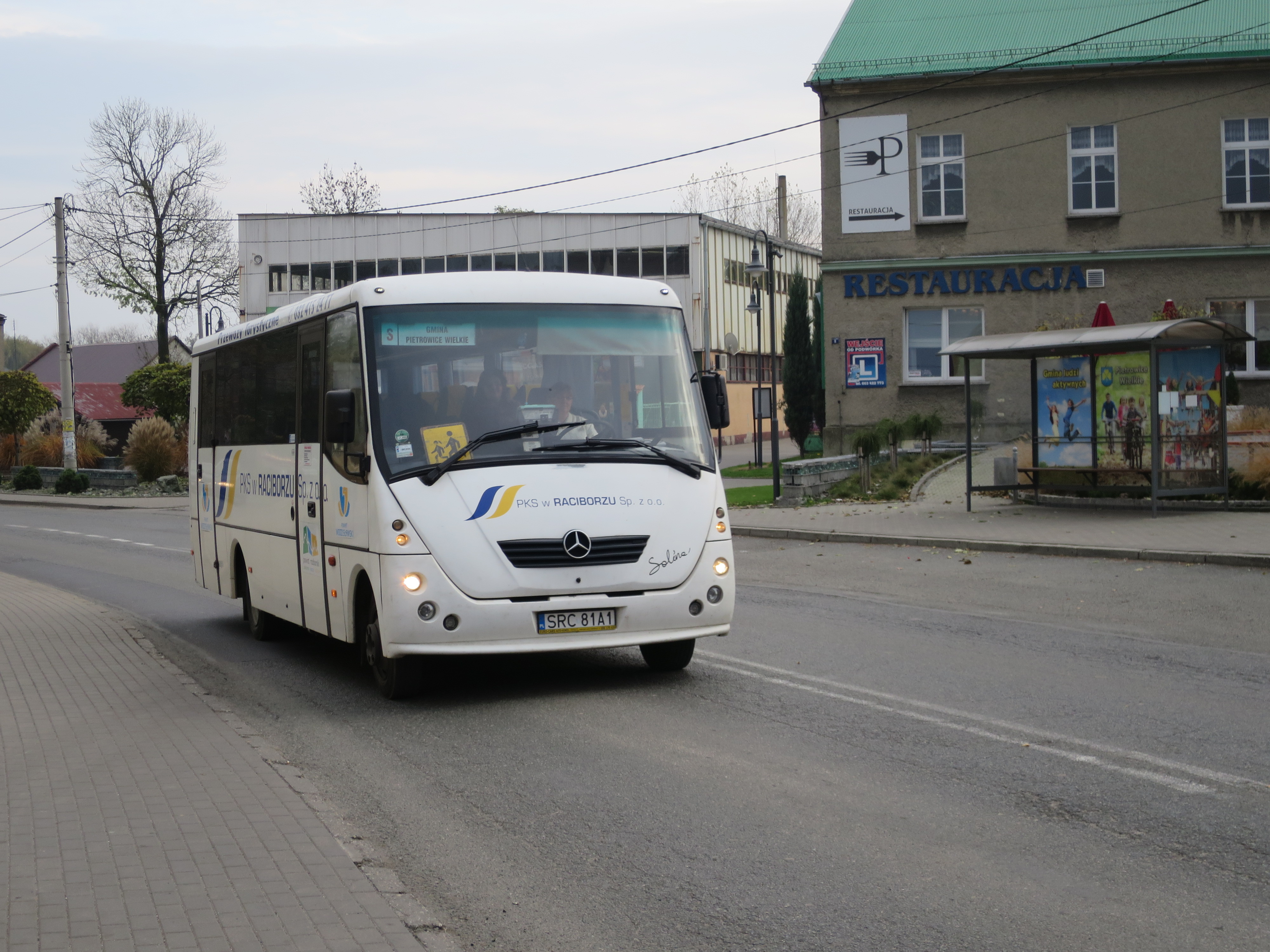
Bus
