= Gmina Pietrowice Wielkie =

Gmina Pietrowice Wielkie Pietrowice Wielkie Commune
- Gmina
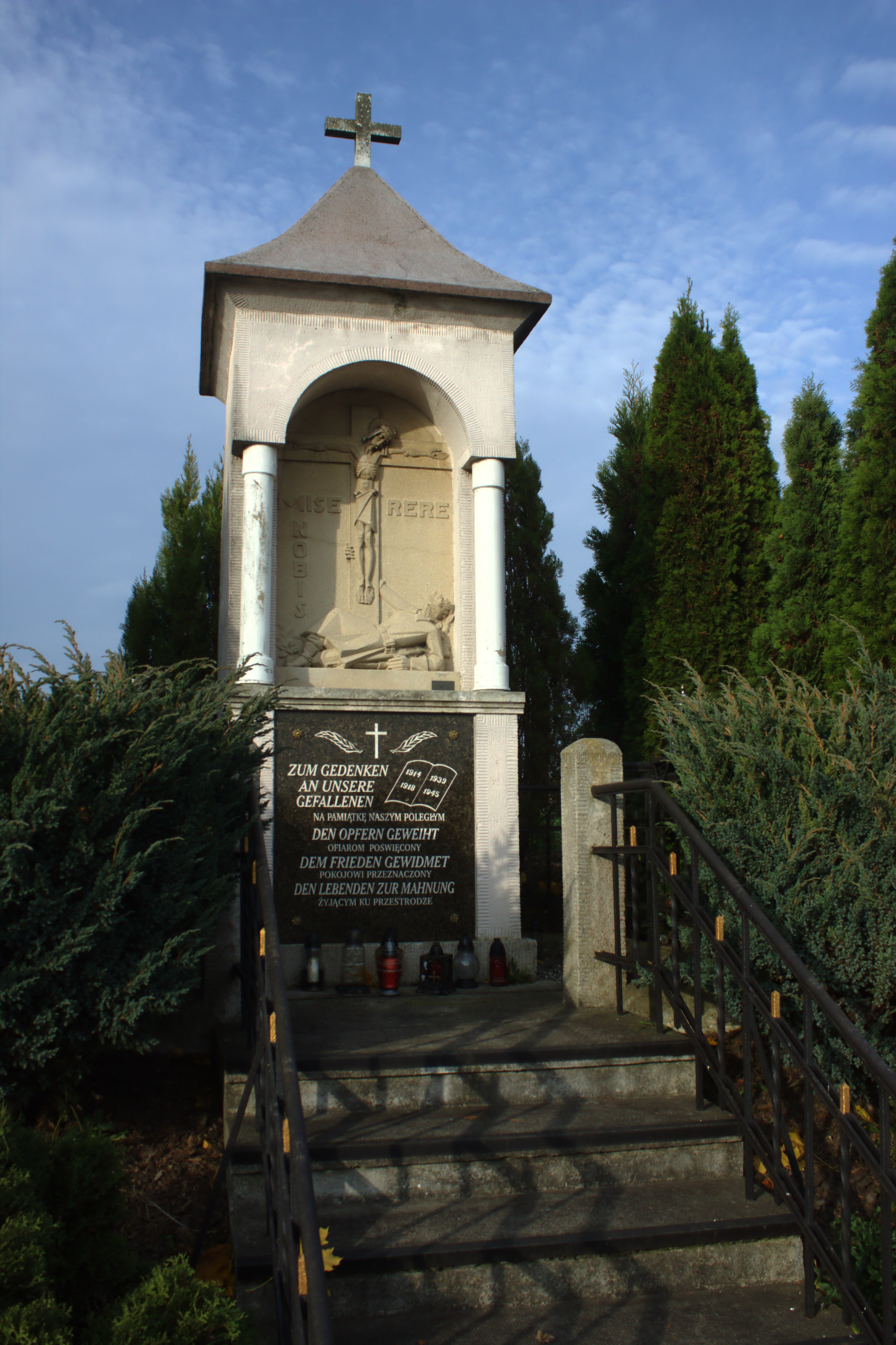
- Chapell in Lekartów

- Flag Coat of arms
- Interactive map of Gmina Pietrowice Wielkie
- Coordinates (Pietrowice Wielkie): 50°5′6″N 18°5′1″E
- Country: Poland
- Voivodeship: Silesian
- County: Racibórz
- Seat: Pietrowice Wielkie

Area
  - Total: 68.07 km^{2} (26.28 sq mi)

Population (2019-06-30)
  - Total: 6,908
  - Density: 101.5/km^{2} (262.8/sq mi)
- Website: http://www.pietrowicewielkie.com.pl

Gmina Pietrowice Wielkie is a rural gmina (administrative district) in Racibórz County, Silesian Voivodeship, in southern Poland, on the Czech border. Its seat is the village of Pietrowice Wielkie, which lies approximately 11 kilometres (7 mi) west of Racibórz and 68 km (42 mi) west of the regional capital Katowice.

The gmina covers an area of 68.07 square kilometres (26.3 sq mi), and as of 2019, its total population was 6,908.

== Villages ==
Gmina Pietrowice Wielkie contains the villages and settlements of Amandów, Cyprzanów, Gródczanki, Kornice, Krowiarki, Lekartów, Maków, Pawłów, Pietrowice Wielkie, Samborowice and Żerdziny.

== Neighbouring gminas ==
Gmina Pietrowice Wielkie is bordered by the town of Racibórz and by the gminas of Baborów, Kietrz, Krzanowice and Rudnik. It also borders the Czech Republic.

== Twin towns – sister cities ==
Gmina Pietrowice Wielkie is twinned with:

- Liederbach am Taunus, Germany
- Sudice, Czech Republic

== Gallery ==
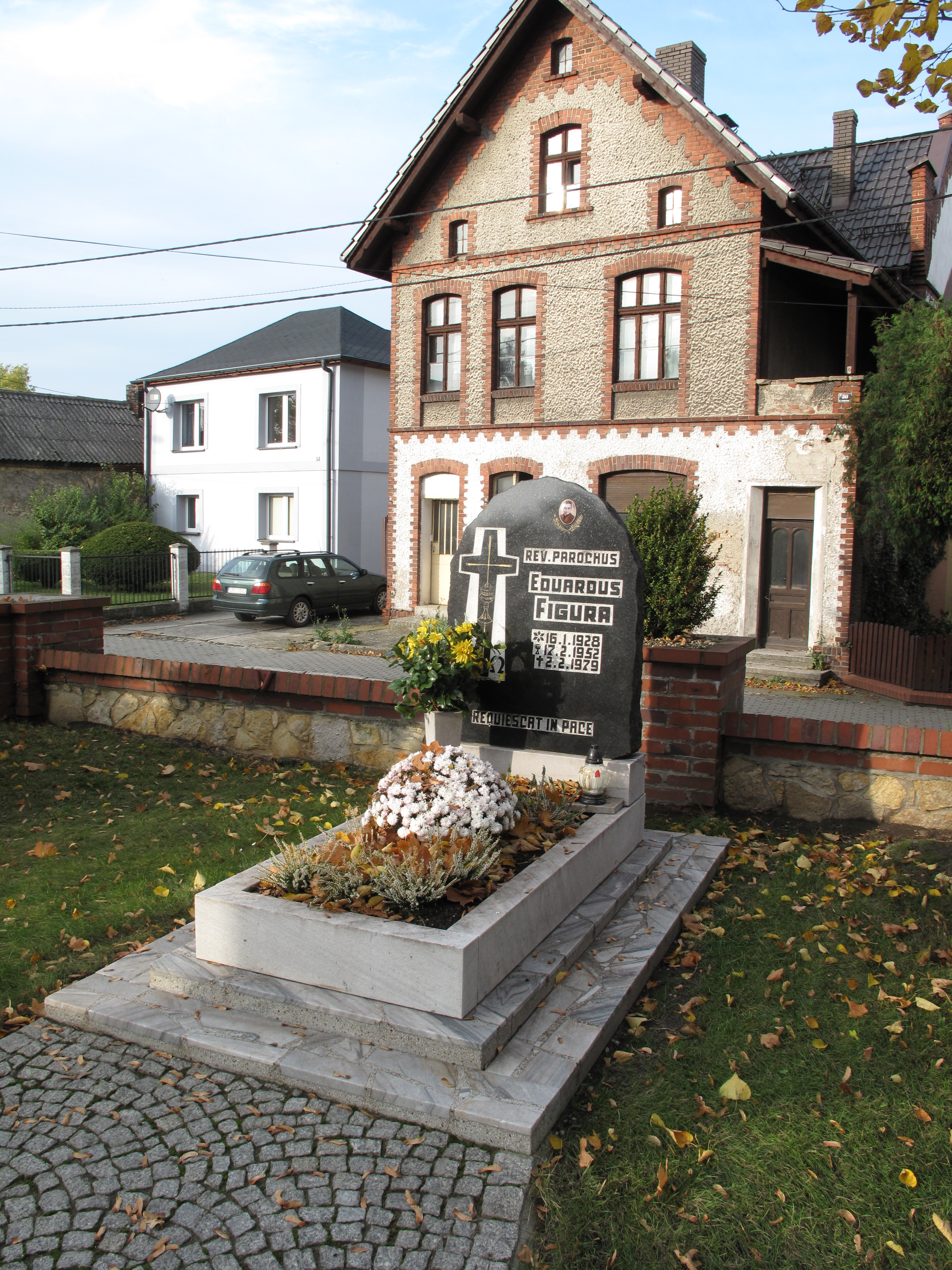
Memorial in Cyprzanów

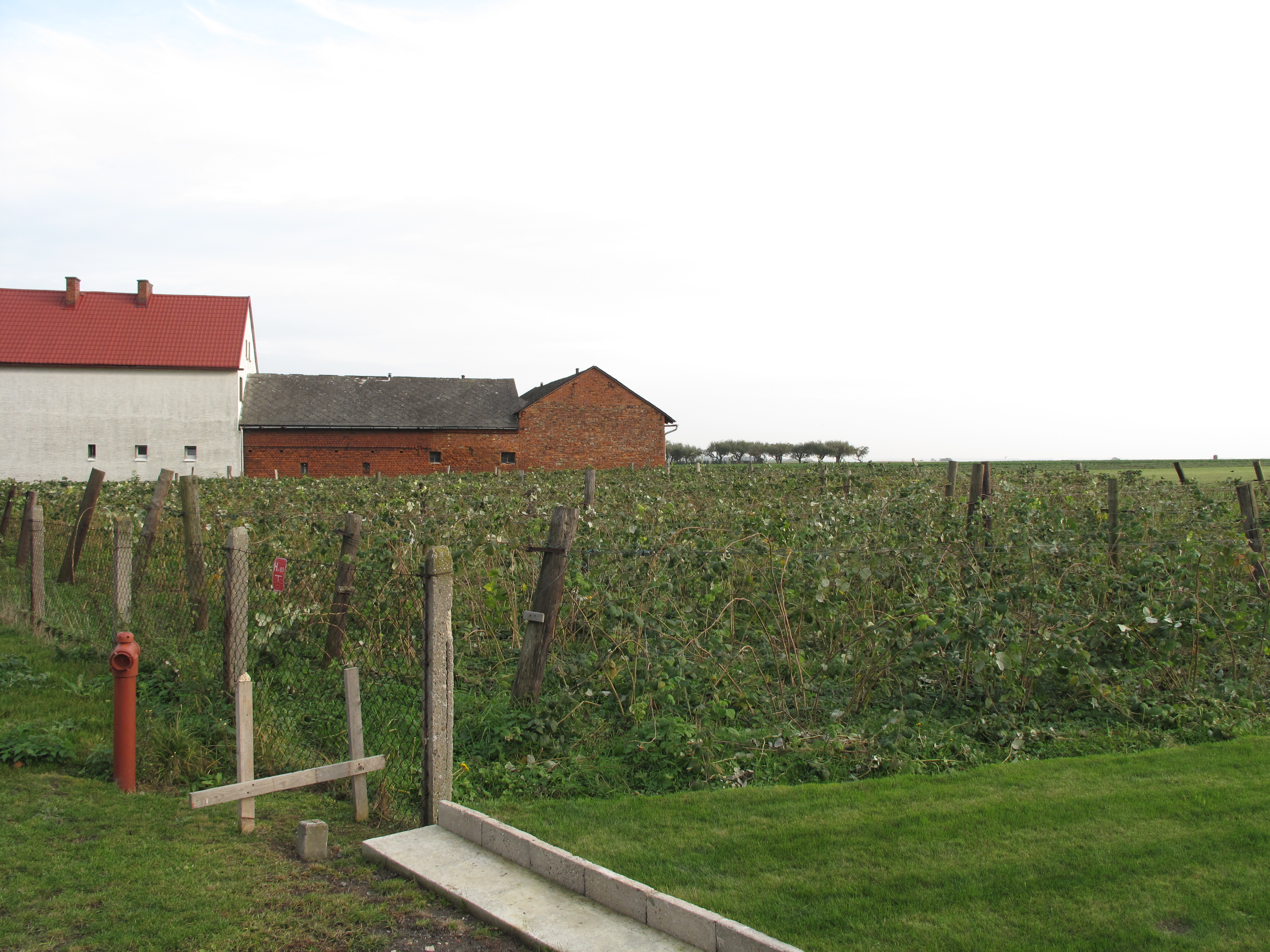
Plantation in Samborowice

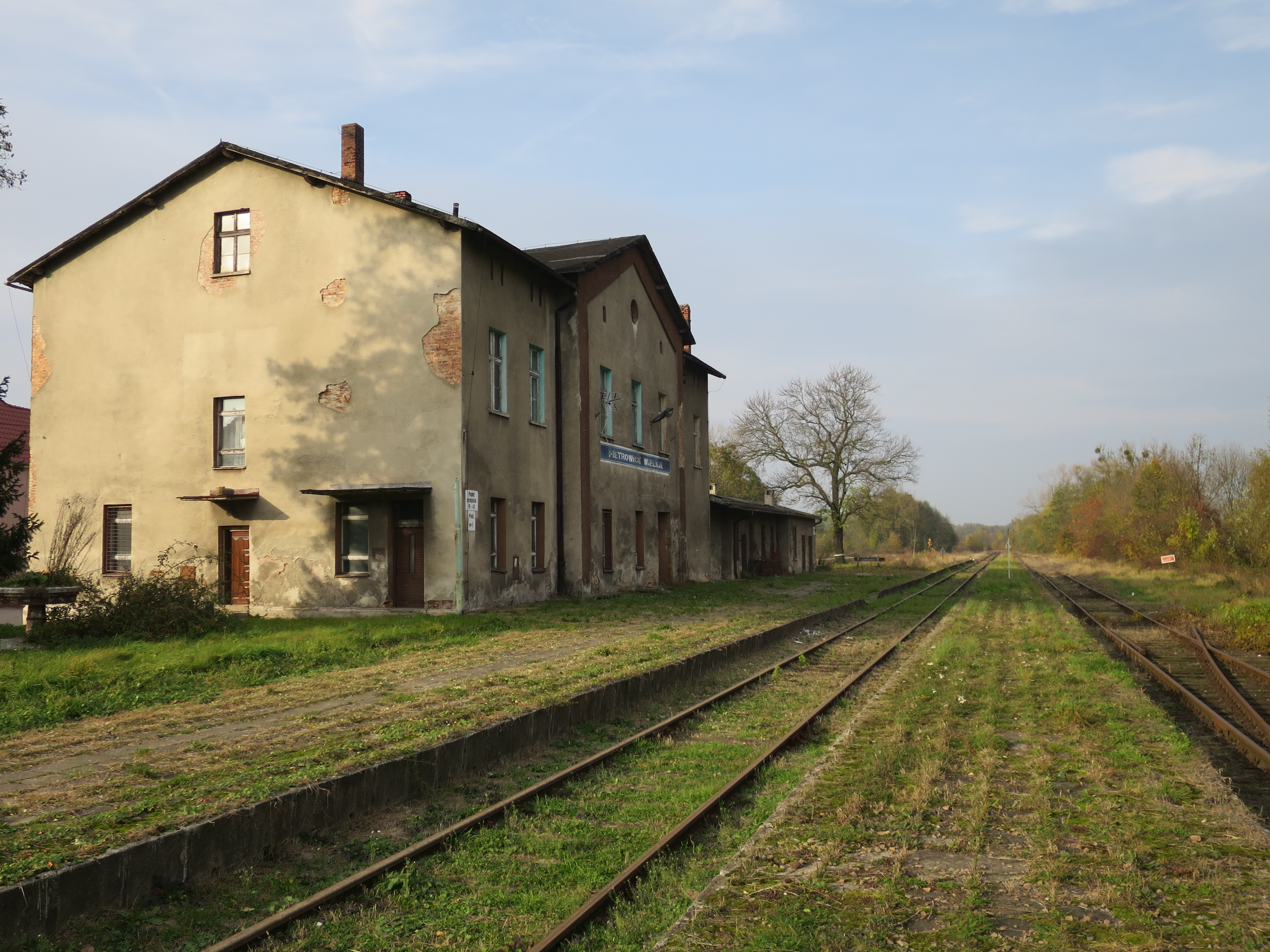
Abandoned train station in Pietrowice Wielkie
