= Maków, Silesian Voivodeship =

Maków
- Village
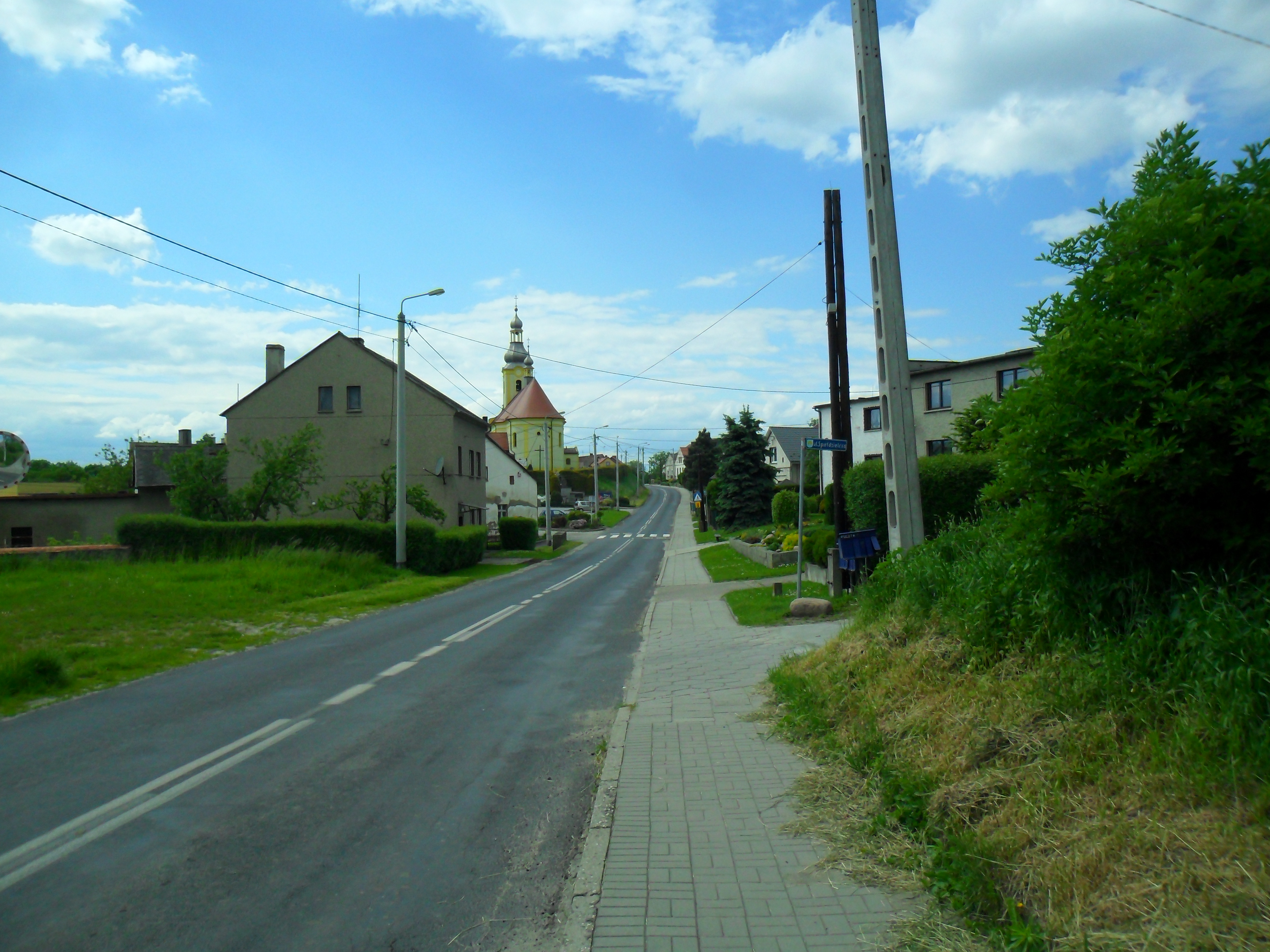
- A road through the village

- Location within Poland
- Coordinates: 50°6′30″N 18°5′1″E
- Country: Poland
- Voivodeship: Silesian
- County: Racibórz
- Gmina: Pietrowice Wielkie
- Population: 780

Maków ([ˈmakuf]; German: Makau) is a village in the administrative district of Gmina Pietrowice Wielkie, within Racibórz County, Silesian Voivodeship, in southern Poland, close to the Czech border.

== Notable people ==
- Maksymilian Krybus (1894-1970), Polish doctor.
