= Pawłów, Silesian Voivodeship =

Pawłów
- Village
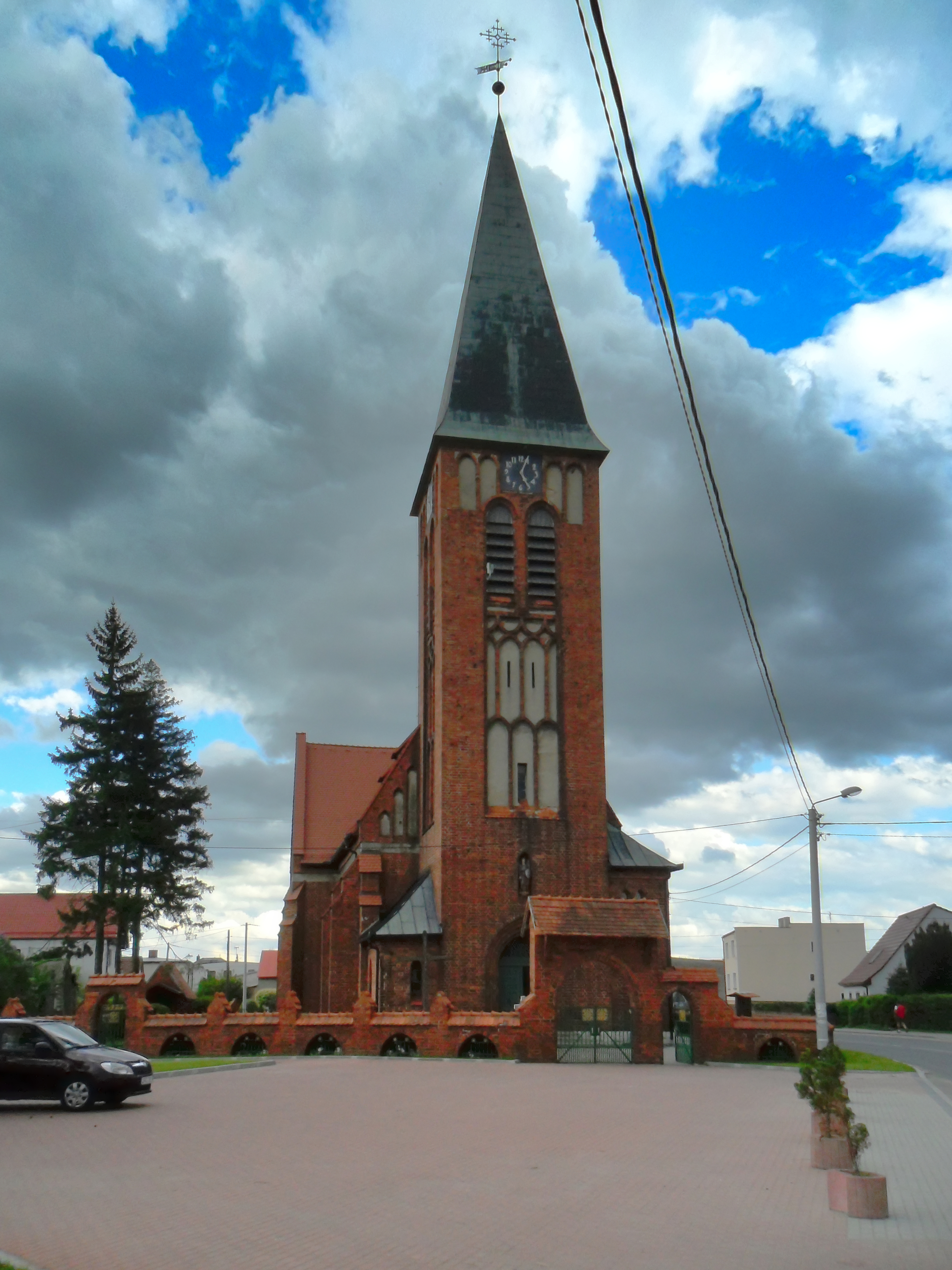
- A local Catholic church

- Location within Poland
- Coordinates: 50°6′N 18°7′E
- Country: Poland
- Voivodeship: Silesian
- County: Racibórz
- Gmina: Pietrowice Wielkie
- Population: 670
- Website: http://www.pawlow.eu

Pawłów ([ˈpavwuf]; German: Pawlau, 1936–1945 Paulsgrund) is a village in the administrative district of Gmina Pietrowice Wielkie, within Racibórz County, Silesian Voivodeship, in southern Poland, close to the Czech border.
