= Samborowice, Silesian Voivodeship =

Samborowice
- Village
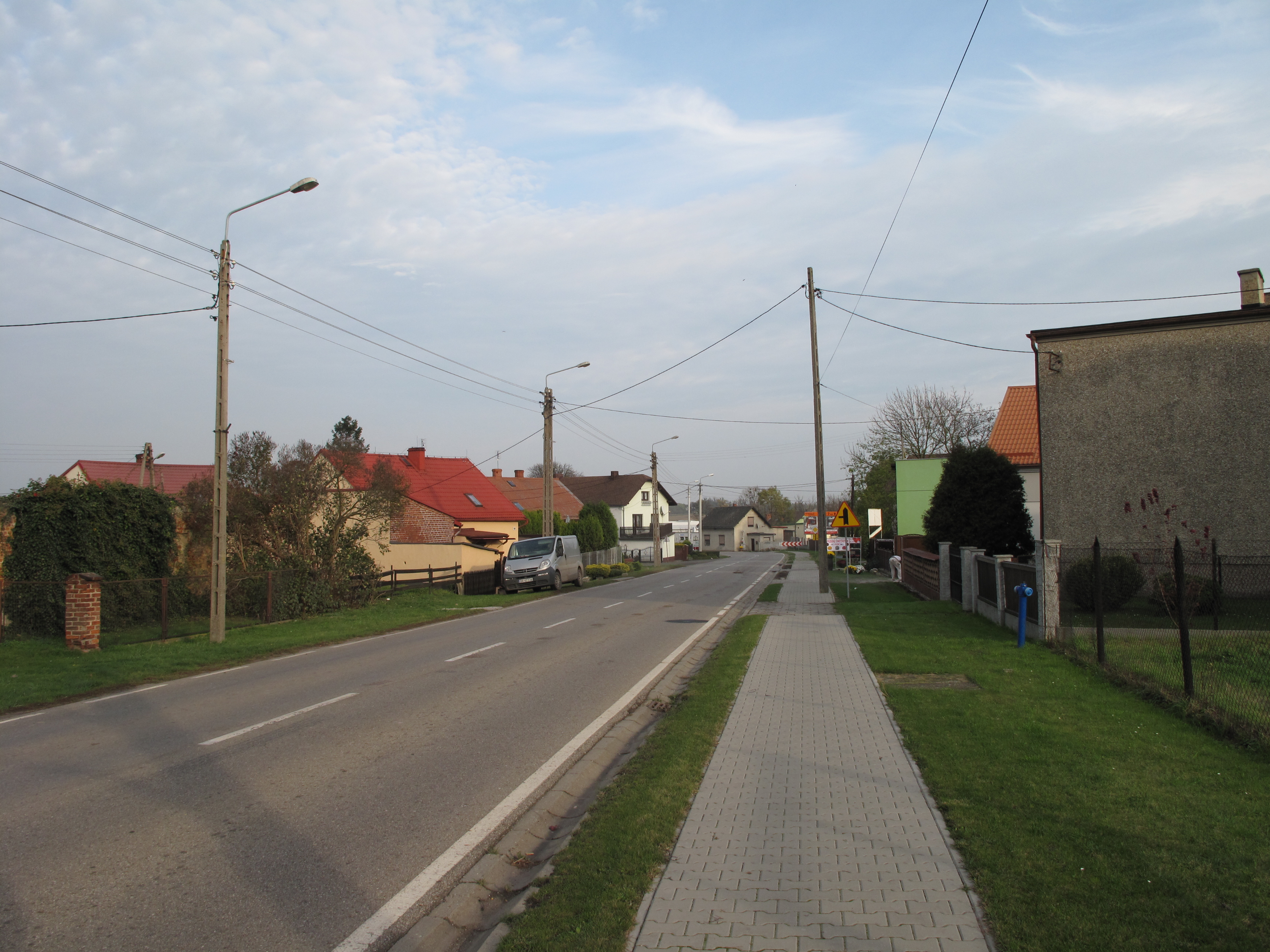
- Street

- Location within Poland
- Coordinates: 50°3′N 18°7′E
- Country: Poland
- Voivodeship: Silesian
- County: Racibórz
- Gmina: Pietrowice Wielkie
- Population: 720

Samborowice ([sambɔrɔˈvit͡sɛ]; German: Schammerwitz, 1936–1945 Schammerau) is a village in the administrative district of Gmina Pietrowice Wielkie, within Racibórz County, Silesian Voivodeship, in southern Poland, close to the Czech border.
