= Krowiarki, Silesian Voivodeship =

Krowiarki
- Village
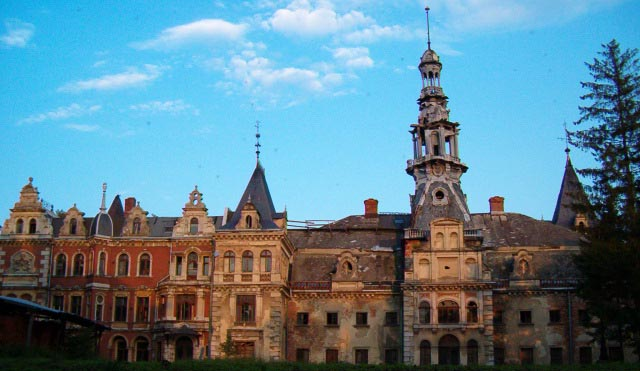
- Palace in Krowiarki

- Location within Poland
- Coordinates: 50°8′N 18°4′E
- Country: Poland
- Voivodeship: Silesian
- County: Racibórz
- Gmina: Pietrowice Wielkie
- Population: 1,100

Krowiarki ([krɔˈvjarki]; German: Preußisch Krawarn) is a village in the administrative district of Gmina Pietrowice Wielkie, within Racibórz County, Silesian Voivodeship, in southern Poland, close to the Czech border.

There is a palace in the village built in the 17th century, later rebuilt on several occasions.
