= Cyprzanów =

- Village
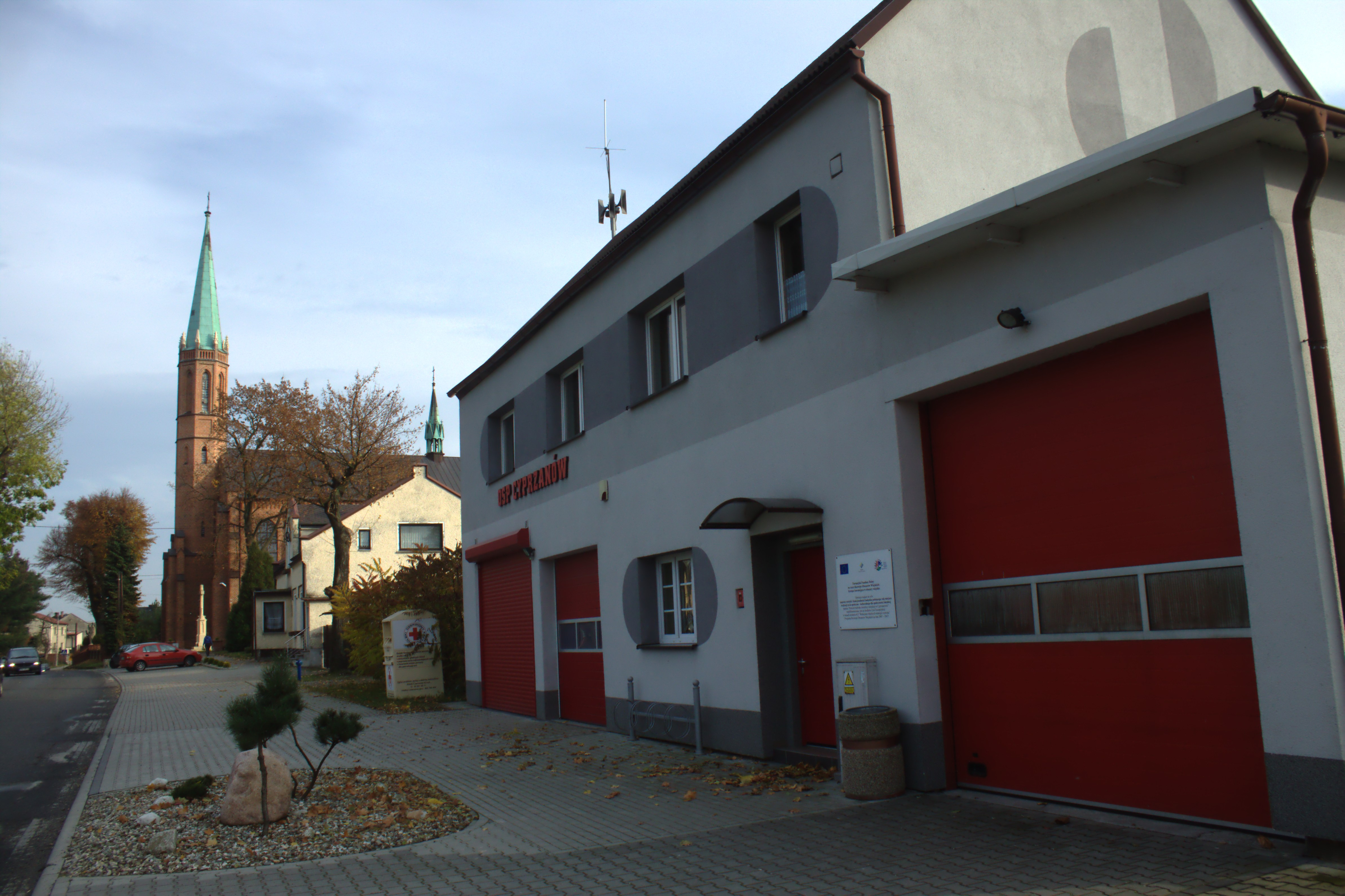
- Fire department station and a church

- Location within Poland
- Coordinates: 50°4′N 18°6′E
- Country: Poland
- Voivodeship: Silesian
- County: Racibórz
- Gmina: Pietrowice Wielkie
- Population: 550

Cyprzanów ([t͡sɨˈpʂanuf], German: Janowitz, 1936-1945 Janken) is a village in the administrative district of Gmina Pietrowice Wielkie, within Racibórz County, Silesian Voivodeship, in southern Poland, close to the Czech border.

== Gallery ==
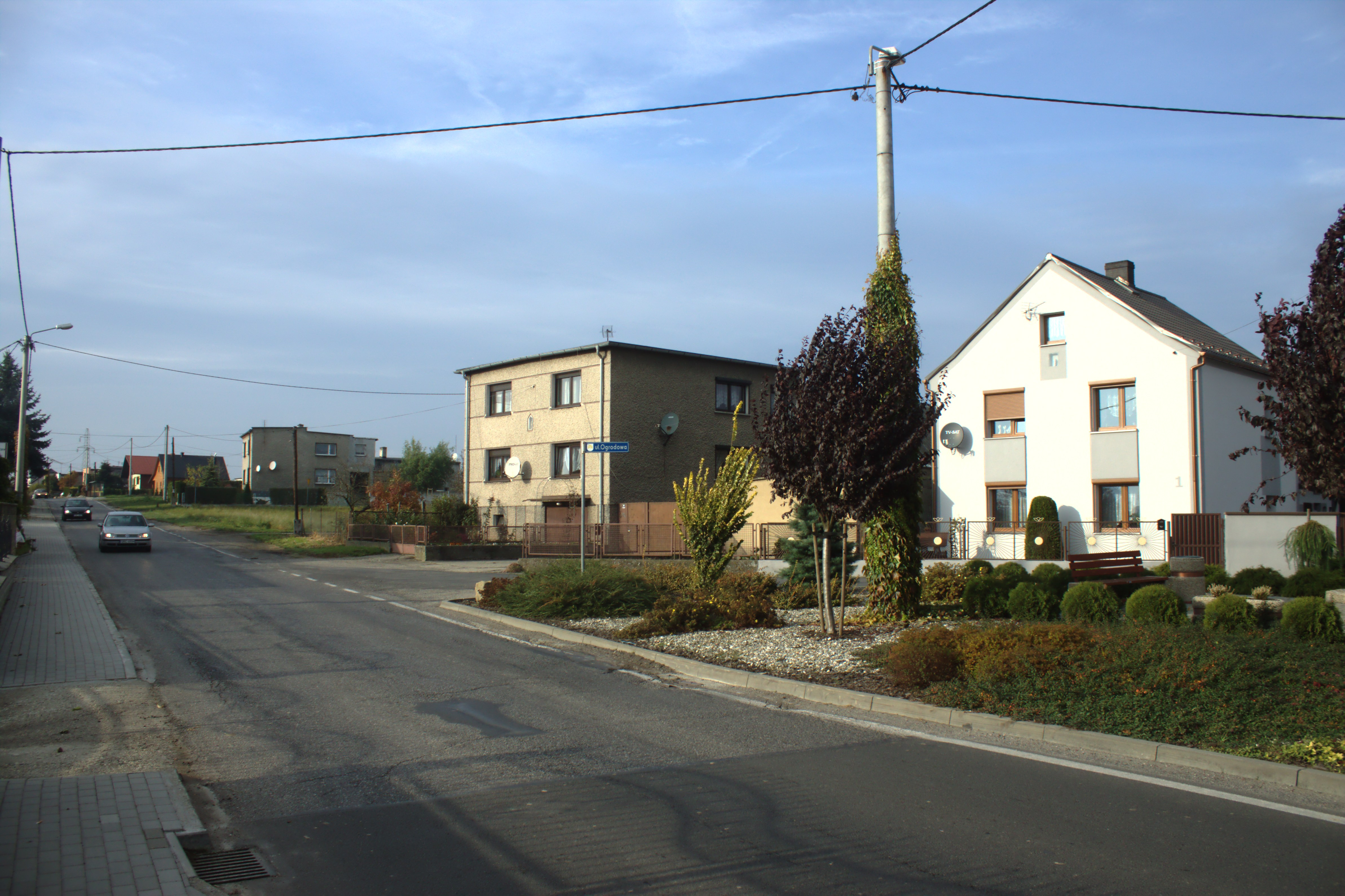
Houses

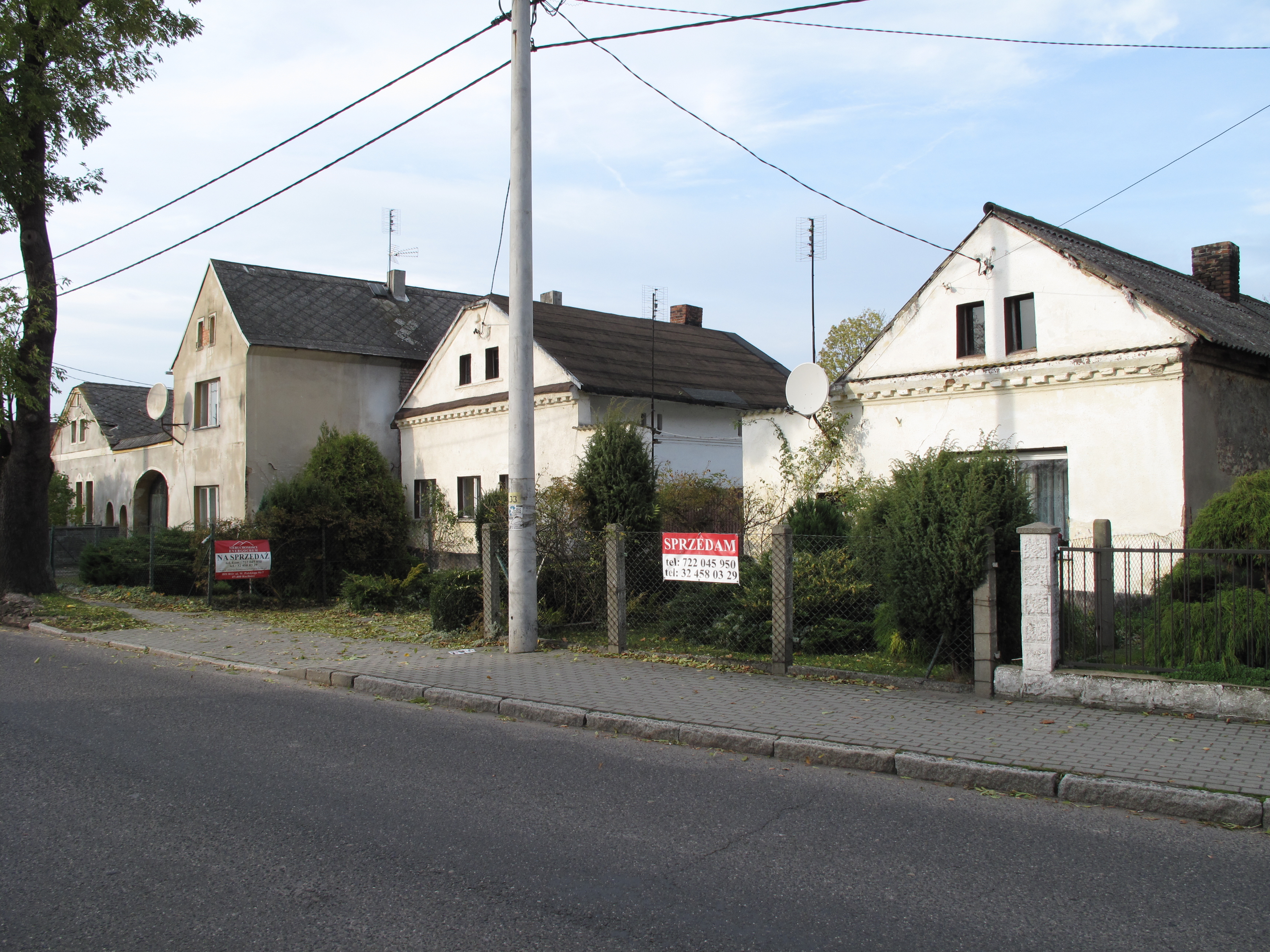
Houses for sale

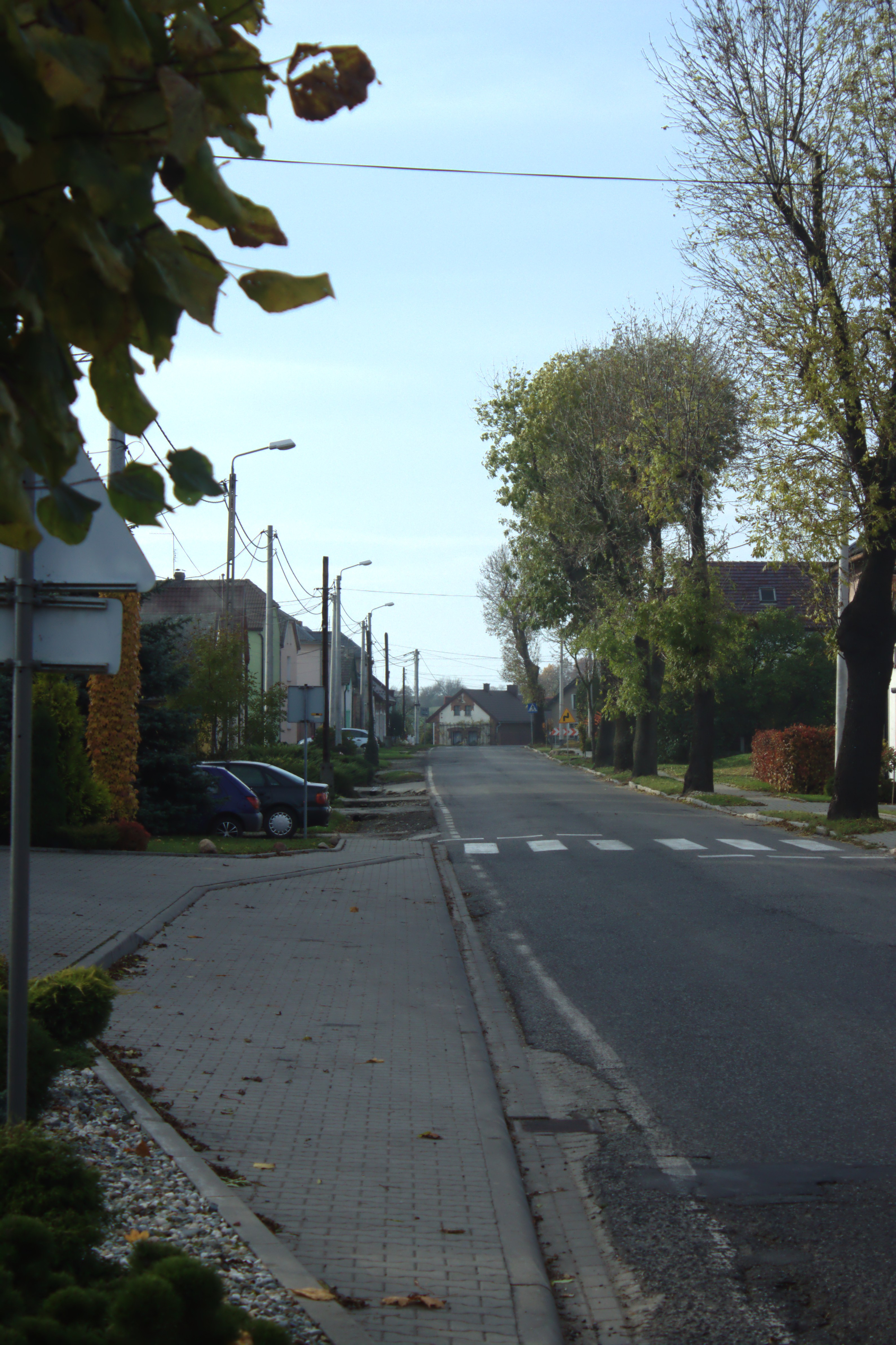
Street
