= Eko-Okna =

Polish company producing doors and windows

Eko-Okna S.A.
- Built: 1998
- Location: Kornice (HQ) and Wodzisław Śląski, Poland
- Coordinates: 50°05′41″N 18°05′52″E
- Industry: windows factory
- Products: windows, doors, shutters
- Employees: 13,000
- Owner: Mateusz Kłosek

Eko-Okna S.A. is a Polish company established in 1998. Eko-Okna is Europe's largest producer of aluminum and uPVC windows, doors, and shutters.

With manufacturing facilities located in southern Poland in Kornice and Wodzisław Śląski, it employs approximately 13,000 employees, Eko-Okna products are accessible in 40 foreign markets.

== History ==
Eko-Okna was created in 1998. The new plant in Kornice was opened in 2009. In 2023 another factory was opened in Wodzisław Śląski. Thanks to this investment, the company significantly increased its production capacity and employment.
