= Książ Wielkopolski =

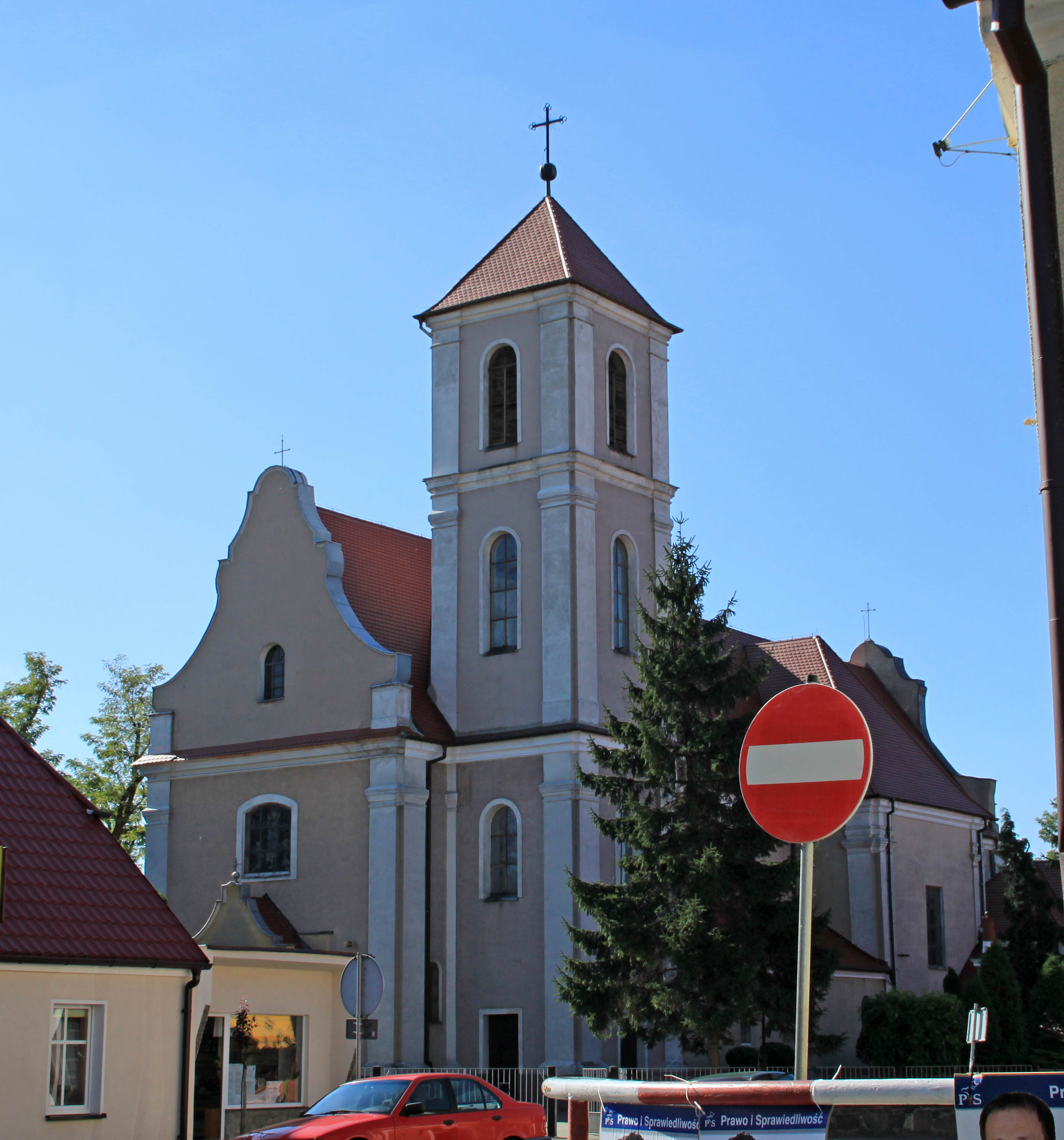
- Church of the Virgin Mary and Saint Nicholas

- Flag Coat of arms

- Location within Poland
- Coordinates: 52°4′N 17°14′E
- Country: Poland
- Voivodeship: Greater Poland
- County: Śrem
- Gmina: Książ Wielkopolski
- First mentioned: 1193
- Town rights: 1407

Area
  - Total: 2.26 km^{2} (0.87 sq mi)

Population (2010)
  - Total: 2,738
  - Density: 1,210/km^{2} (3,140/sq mi)
- Time zone: UTC+1 (CET)
  - Summer (DST): UTC+2 (CEST)
- Area code: +48 061
- Vehicle registration: PSE
- Climate: Cfb
- Website: http://www.ksiaz-wlkp.pl/

Książ Wielkopolski (Polish pronunciation: [ˈkɕɔ̃ʐ vjɛlkɔˈpɔlskʲi]) is a town in Śrem County, Poland, with 2,738 inhabitants (2010).

== History ==
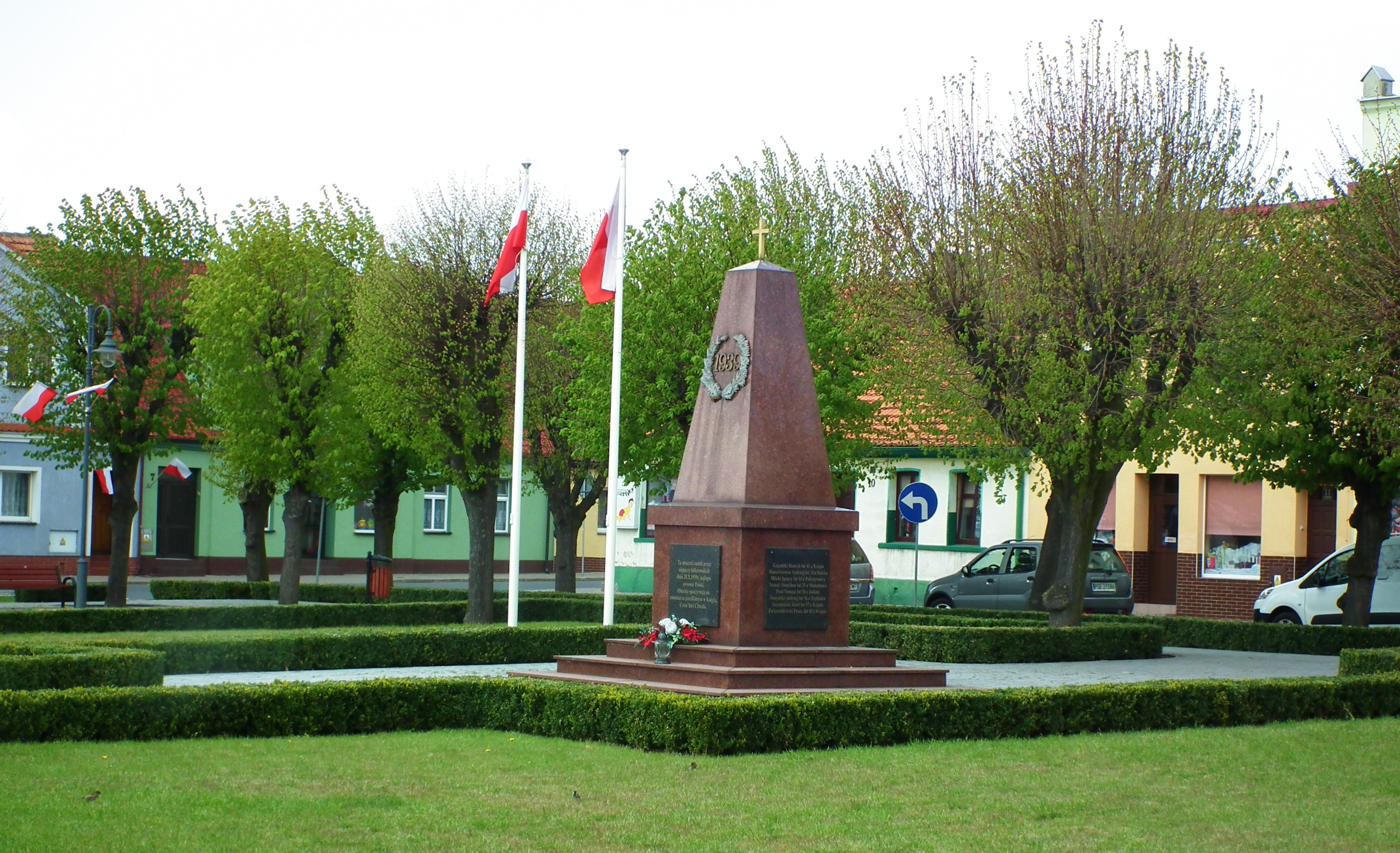
Memorial at the site of the German massacre of Poles committed on October 20, 1939

The town was first mentioned in a bull of Pope Celestine III in 1193, when it was part of Piast-ruled Poland. In 1273 it was mentioned as a seat of a castellany. It was granted town rights between 1398 and 1416. Książ was a private town of Polish nobility, administratively located in the Kościan County in the Poznań Voivodeship in the Greater Poland Province of the Kingdom of Poland.

Following the joint German-Soviet invasion of Poland, which started World War II in September 1939, the town was occupied by Germany until 1945 and local Poles were subjected to various crimes. On October 20, 1939, the German Einsatzgruppe VI carried out a public execution of 17 Poles at the main square as part of the Intelligenzaktion. Among the victims were a bank director, teacher, merchant, forester, military officer, landowners and mayor of the nearby town of Dolsk. It was one of many massacres of Poles committed by Germany on October 20–23 across the region in attempt to pacify and terrorize the Polish population. The first expulsions of Poles were carried out by Germany in winter of 1939–1940. Under German occupation the town's name was changed to Tiefenbach and then Schonz in attempt to erase traces of Polish origin.

== Demographics ==
Historical population

Year	Pop.	±%
1843	1,087	—
1871	1,019	−6.3%
1880	998	−2.1%
1890	948	−5.0%
1900	918	−3.2%
1910	874	−4.8%

Year	Pop.	±%
1921	913	+4.5%
1931	928	+1.6%
1939	1,800	+94.0%
1950	1,597	−11.3%
1960	1,744	+9.2%
2010	2,738	+57.0%

== Sports ==
The local football club is Pogoń Książ Wielkopolski. It competes in the lower leagues.

== Notable people ==
- Heinrich Graetz (1817–1891), historian, wrote a history of the Jewish people from a Jewish perspective.
