= Żerdziny, Silesian Voivodeship =

Żerdziny
- Village
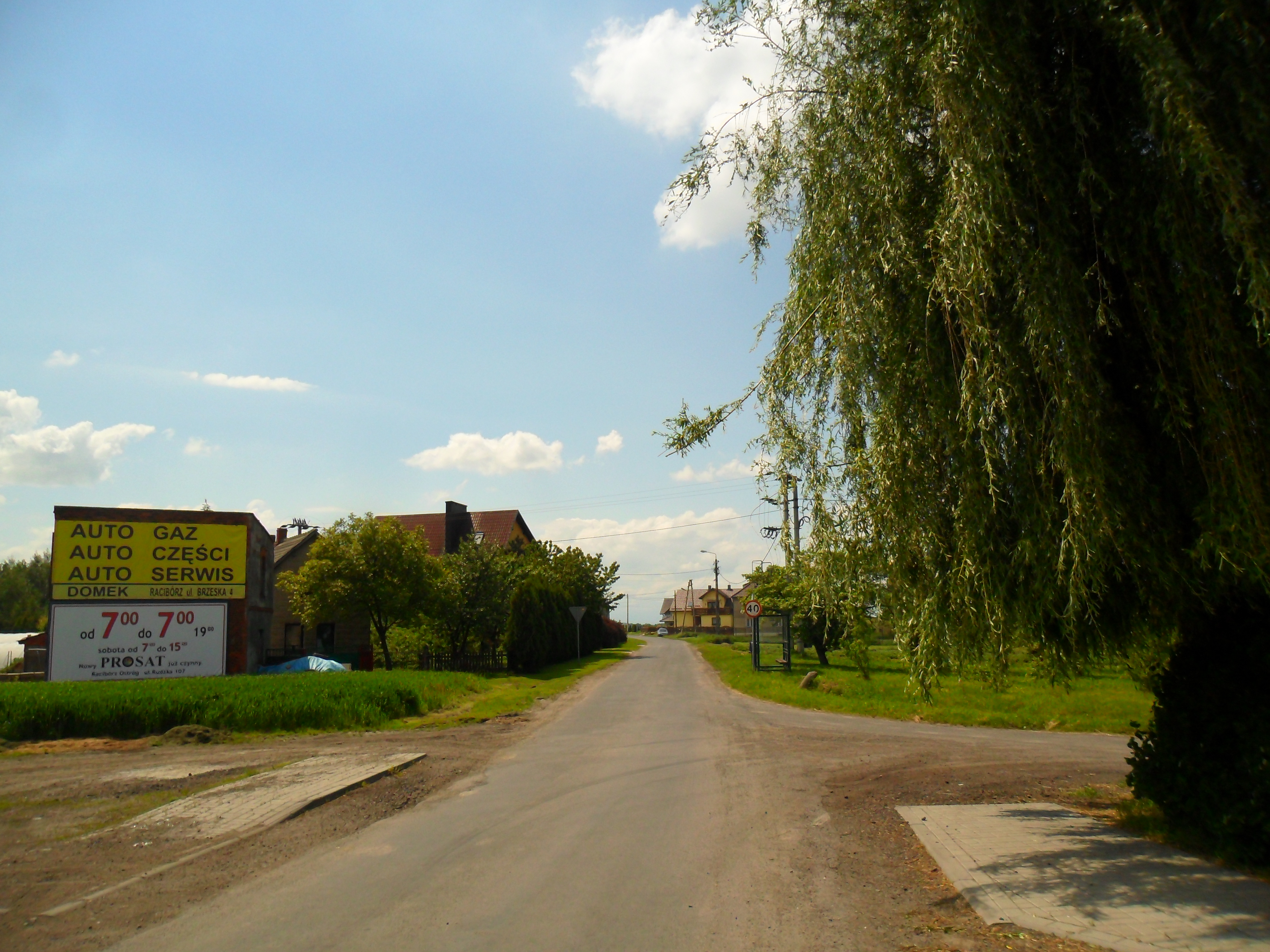

- Location within Poland
- Coordinates: 50°5′48″N 18°8′54″E
- Country: Poland
- Voivodeship: Silesian
- County: Racibórz
- Gmina: Pietrowice Wielkie

Żerdziny ([ʐɛrˈd͡ʑinɨ]; German: Schardzin, 1936–1945 Hohenau) is a village in the administrative district of Gmina Pietrowice Wielkie, within Racibórz County, Silesian Voivodeship, in southern Poland, close to the Czech border.
