= Fractured =

Fractured may refer to:

- Fracture, the separation of a material into pieces under the action of stress
- Bone fracture, a partial or complete break in the continuity of the bone

== Books ==
- Fractured, a 2008 novel by Karin Slaughter
- Fractured, a 2021 non-fiction book by Jon Yates

== Film and TV ==
- Fractured, an American horror film by Adam Gierasch
- Fractured, an American thriller film by Brad Anderson
- “Fractured”, an episode of The Good Doctor
- Fractured, an iWantTFC original series

== Music ==
- Fractured or the title song, 2004
- Fractured or the title song, 2017
- Fractured, an album by New Mind (Jonathan Sharp), 1993
- Fractured, 1953
- Fractured, a song by Taproot, 2010

== See also ==
- Fracture (disambiguation)
- Fraction (disambiguation)
- Fragment (disambiguation)
- Shatter (disambiguation)
