= Racial separatism =

Racial separatism is the desire of a group of people to be independent from other groups.

Racial separatism may refer to:

- Racial segregation, separation of humans into racial groups in daily life
- Black separatism, a movement to create separate institutions for people of African descent in societies historically dominated by whites
- White separatism, a political movement that seeks separate economic and cultural development for white people

== See also ==
- Separatist (disambiguation)
- Separate (disambiguation)
- Segregation (disambiguation)
