= Fracture (disambiguation) =

A fracture is the appearance of a crack or complete separation of an object or material into two or more pieces under the action of stress.

Fracture (s) may also refer to:

== Common uses ==
- Bone fracture, a medical condition in which a bone is cracked or broken
- Fracture (geology), a fracture within a geological formation
- Fracture (mineralogy), a term in mineralogy describing the shape and texture of broken surfaces

== Arts and entertainment ==
=== Film and television ===
- Fracture (2004 film), a New Zealand film directed by Larry Parr
- Fracture (2007 film), an American film starring Anthony Hopkins and Ryan Gosling
- "Fracture" (Friday Night Lights), an episode of the TV series Friday Night Lights
- "Fracture" (Fringe), a season 2 episode of the television series Fringe
- Fracture (Transformers), a fictional character

== Music ==
- Fracture (Roller Trio album), 2014
- Fracture (Bleed from Within album), 2020
- "Fracture" (song), a song by Slumberjack
- "Fracture", a song by Fit for a King from the album The Hell We Create
- "Fracture", a song by King Crimson from the album Starless and Bible Black
- Fractures (Killing the Dream album), 2008
- Fractures (Sons of Korah album)
- "Fractures", a song by Parkway Drive from the album Ire

=== Other arts and entertainment ===
- Fracture (video game), a third-person shooter video game
- Fractures: Family Stories, a book by Budge Wilson

== Other uses ==
- Fracture (company), an Internet-based photo finishing service

== See also ==
- Fraction (disambiguation)
- Fractography, the study of the fracture surfaces of materials
- Fracture toughness, material property measuring the resistance to fracture
- Fracture mechanics, predicting the propagation of cracks
- Fractured (disambiguation)
- Fragment (disambiguation)
- Fraktur (disambiguation)
- Shatter (disambiguation)
