= Separator =

Separator can refer to:

- A mechanical device to separate fluids and solids, like
  - Cream separator, separates cream from milk
  - Demister (vapor), removal of liquid droplets entrained in a vapor stream
  - Separator (oil production), of an oil production plant
  - Vapor–liquid separator, separates a vapor–liquid mixture
  - a machine used to produce mechanically separated meat
- The historic Swedish company name AB Separator, common ancestor of Alfa Laval and DeLaval
- Air classifier, a mechanical device to separate components of air
- Community separator, a term of urban planning
- Separator (electricity), a porous or ion-conducting barrier used to separate anode and cathode in electrochemical systems, also known as diaphragm
- Planar separator theorem, a theorem in graph theory
  - Vertex separator, a notion in graph theory
- Geometric separator, a line that separates a set of geometric shapes to two subsets
- A synonym for "generator" in category theory
- A mathematical sign used to separate the integer part from the fractional part of a number. For example, the decimal point and the binary point
- A synonym for "delimiter" in computer parlance
- Orthodontic spacer, also known as orthodontic separators
- Four of the C0 and C1 control codes used in digital character encoding
- A song by Radiohead, off the 2011 album The King of Limbs
- In computing, a Printer separator to flag the start and end of jobs on a printer

== See also ==
- Separatrix (disambiguation)
- Separation (disambiguation)
- Separation theorem (disambiguation)
- Decimal separator
- Thousands separator
