= Secession (disambiguation) =

Secession is the act of withdrawing from an organization, union, or political entity.

Secession may also refer to:

== Political secession ==
- Liberal Union, also called Secession, a leftist break-away from the National Liberal Party in the German Empire
- Secession in the United States
  - Killington, Vermont, secession movement, current court battle over the voted defection of a Vermont town to New Hampshire
  - Missouri secession, a controversy over the double secession status of Missouri in the American Civil War era
  - Ordinance of Secession, an ordinance ratified by the seceding states that was one of the causes of the American Civil War
  - Secession in New York, movements to support the secession of New York City from the state or union
- Secession of Quebec (disambiguation), articles about the possible secession of Quebec from Canada
- Secessionism in Western Australia, a movement for political independence
- Urban secession, a movement for the quasi-secession of a city

== Social secession ==
- 1857 Secession, secession from the Reformed Church in America in 1857 which led to the formation of the Christian Reformed Church in North America
- Aventine Secession (disambiguation), secessions of the Aventine district in Rome
- First Secession, from the Church of Scotland in 1733
- Secessio plebis, the original secessions of ancient Rome
- Secession of 1834 or Afscheiding, secession from the Dutch Reformed Church in 1834 which led to the formation of the Christelijke Gereformeerde Kerken

== Arts, entertainment, and media ==
=== Arts movements ===
- Secession (art), the series of secession movements in art during the late 19th and early 20th century, including:
  - Berlin Secession, the 1898 break from the Association of Berlin Artists
  - Sonderbund westdeutscher Kunstfreunde und Künstler, the Düsseldorf secession of 1909
  - Vienna Secession, the 1897 secession that led to the Austrian branch of Art Nouveau
- Photo-Secession, a movement that promoted photography as a fine art

=== Other uses in arts, entertainment, and media ===
- Secession (band), a 1980s Scottish synthpop band
- Secession (magazine), a 1920s American expatriate literary magazine
- Secession, a collaboration album between Starringo & Aha Gazelle
- "Secession" (Succession), an episode of the television series Succession

== See also ==
- List of active separatist movements
- List of historical separatist movements
- List of states with limited recognition
- List of U.S. state partition proposals
- List of U.S. county secession proposals
- Separatist (disambiguation)
- Succession (disambiguation)
