= Fatness =

Fatness may refer to:

- Obesity, a medical condition where excess body fat has accumulated to the extent that it may have a negative impact on health
- The property of a fat object, in geometry, referring to an object in two or more dimensions whose lengths in the different dimensions are similar
