= Yan's theorem =

In probability theory, Yan's theorem is a separation and existence result. It is of particular interest in financial mathematics where one uses it to prove the Kreps-Yan theorem.

The theorem was published by Jia-An Yan. It was proven for the L^{1} space and later generalized by Jean-Pascal Ansel to the case $1\leq p<+\infty$.

== Yan's theorem ==
Notation:

$\overline{\Omega}$ is the closure of a set $\Omega$.
$$A-B=\{f-g:f\in A,\;g\in B\}$$.
$I_A$ is the indicator function of $A$.
$q$ is the conjugate index of $p$.

=== Statement ===
Let $(\Omega,\mathcal{F},P)$ be a probability space, $1\leq p<+\infty$ and $B_+$ be the space of non-negative and bounded random variables. Further let $K\subseteq L^p(\Omega,\mathcal{F},P)$ be a convex subset and $0\in K$.

Then the following three conditions are equivalent:

1. For all $f\in L_+^p(\Omega,\mathcal{F},P)$ with $f\neq 0$ exists a constant $c>0$, such that $cf \not\in \overline{K-B_+}$.
2. For all $A\in \mathcal{F}$ with $P(A)>0$ exists a constant $c>0$, such that $cI_A \not\in \overline{K-B_+}$.
3. There exists a random variable $Z\in L^q$, such that $Z>0$ almost surely and

$$\sup\limits_{Y\in K}\mathbb{E}[ZY]<+\infty$$.

== Literature ==
- Yan, Jia-An (1980). "Caracterisation d' une Classe d'Ensembles Convexes de $L^1$ ou $H^1$". Séminaire de probabilités de Strasbourg. 14: 220–222.
- Freddy Delbaen and Walter Schachermayer: The Mathematics of Arbitrage (2005). Springer Finance
