= Separation =

Separation may refer to:

== Films ==
- Separation (1967 film), a British feature film written by and starring Jane Arden and directed by Jack Bond
- La Séparation, 1994 French film
- A Separation, 2011 Iranian film
- Separation (2013 film), an American thriller film starring Sarah Manninen
- Separation (2021 film), an American horror film

== Literature ==
- A Separation (novel), a 2017 novel by Katie Kitamura
- Separation, a 1976 Canadian political novel by Richard Rohmer
- The Separation (Applegate novel), a 1999 novel in the Animorphs series by K.A. Applegate
- The Separation (Bury Novel), an 1830 novel by Lady Charlotte Bury
- The Separation (Priest novel), a 2002 novel by Christopher Priest

== Music ==
- Separation, a 2011 album by Balance and Composure
- Separation (EP), a 2006 EP by Halou
- Separations (album), a 1992 album by British alternative rock band Pulp
- Separation mastering, in music recording

== Law and politics ==
- Marital separation, when a married couple ceases living together without a divorce
  - Legal separation, a legal status where married couples may disentangle their finances without divorce
- Nonconformity to the world (separation from the world), a belief among some Protestant religious groups that the members of a church should be separate from "the world"
- Political separation (separatism), advocacy of a state of cultural, ethnic, tribal, religious, racial, governmental or gender separation from the larger group
- Separation of church and state, the idea that religion and government functions should be separate

== Mathematics and science ==
- Separation (behavior), the behavior of flocking animals to stand off from their neighbours
- Separation (statistics), a problem encountered in fitting models for categorical outcomes
- Flow separation, separation of a fluid boundary layer from the surface of a solid body moving relative to the fluid
- Intertemporal portfolio choice#Time-independent decisions, where in some contexts portfolio choices for many periods can be made separately
- Separated sets, related concept in topology, two sets disjoint from the other's closure
- Separation axiom, concepts in the area of mathematics called topology
- Separation of concerns, in computer science (and problem-solving in general)
- Separation of variables, in mathematics to solve certain (separable) differential equations
- Separation principle, in control theory
- Separation process, in chemistry
- Separation theorem (disambiguation): several different theorems related to separation, in different scientific disciplines, for example:
  - Mutual fund separation theorem, allowing a portfolio optimization problem to be separated into smaller problems
- Point-pair separation, in an order two pairs of points may or may not separate each other

== Other uses ==
- Separation (aeronautics), rules to minimise the risk of collision between aircraft in flight
- Separation (United States military), the process by which a service member leaves active duty
- Separation anxiety disorder, an anxiety disorder in which an individual experiences excessive anxiety regarding separation from home and/or from people to whom the individual has a strong emotional attachment
- Racial separation, the separation of different racial groups in daily life
- Six degrees of separation, the idea that everyone is on average approximately six steps away, by way of introduction, from any other person on earth
- Curdling of an emulsion in cookery is called "separation"
- Cow-calf separation, practice of separating calves and mothers in the dairy industry

== See also ==
- Divide (disambiguation)
- Fragmentation (disambiguation)
- Part (disambiguation)
- Segregation (disambiguation)
- Separate (disambiguation)
- Split (disambiguation)
