= Tverberg =

Tverberg may refer to:

== People ==
- Helge Tverberg (1935–2020), Norwegian mathematician
- Ryan Tverberg (born 2002), Canadian ice hockey player

== Other uses ==
- Tverberg's theorem, mathematics theorem
