= Shatter =

Shatter or shattering may refer to:

- To violently break something into pieces; see fracture

== Entertainment ==
=== Books ===
- Shatter (novel), a 2008 novel by Australian author Michael Robotham
- Shatter Me, a 2011 young adult dystopian thriller by Tahereh Mafi
- The Shattering (novel), a book in the Guardians of Ga'Hoole fantasy book series
- The Shattering: America in the 1960s, a 2021 book by historian Kevin Boyle

=== Films ===
- Shatter (film), a 1974 film shot on location in Hong Kong
- Shatter Dead, a 1994 independent zombie film directed by Scooter McCrae

=== Music ===
- Shatter (EP), a 2010 recording by Swiss black metal band Triptykon
- "Shatter" (song), a 2005 song by the British rock band Feeder
- "Shatter", a song from the 2022 album Surrender by Maggie Rogers
- "Shatter", a song from the 1997 album Blurring the Edges by Meredith Brooks
- Shatter Me (album), a 2014 studio album by American violinist and solo artist Lindsey Stirling
  - Shatter Me (song), a song from that album

=== Other ===
- Shatter (comics), a Marvel Comics fictional mutant character
- Shatter (digital comic), published by First Comics during 1985–1988
- Shatter (video game), a 2009 video game by Sidhe Interactive

== People ==
- Alan Shatter (born 1951), Irish politician
- Susan Louise Shatter (1943–2011), American landscape painter

== Other uses ==
- Shatter (cannabis), a concentrate made from cannabis
- Shatter attack, in computing, a technique used against Microsoft Windows operating systems
- Shatter belt, another term for a geological fault
- Shatter belt (geopolitics), a concept in geopolitics pertaining to regions that are deeply internally divided
- Shatter Cave, a cave in the Mendip Hills, in Somerset, England
- Shattering (agriculture), an undesirable trait in crop plants that makes harvesting difficult
- Shattering (machine learning), a concept in mathematics, especially Vapnik–Chervonenkis theory

== See also ==
- Brisance, the shattering capability of a high explosive
- Fracture (disambiguation)
- Fragment (disambiguation)
- Shatner (disambiguation)
- Shattered (disambiguation)
