= Fragmentation =

Fragmentation or fragmented may refer to:

== Computers ==
- Fragmentation (computing), a phenomenon of computer storage
- File system fragmentation, the tendency of a file system to lay out the contents of files non-continuously
- IP fragmentation, a process in computer networking

== Science ==
- Fragmentation (cell biology), in cells
- Fragmentation (reproduction), a form of asexual reproduction
- Fragmentation of memory, a psychological disorder
- Fragmentation (mass spectrometry), a technique to study structure of molecules
- Fragmentation (weaponry), a feature of explosive weaponry
- Fragmentation (medicine), an operation that breaks of solid matter in a body part into pieces, such as kidney stones
- Fragmentation, the quantification by photoanalysis of blasted material
- Hadronization, with quarks

== Other ==
- Fragmentation (economics), a process of globalization
- Fragmentation (music), a compositional technique
- Fragmentation (sociology), a term used in urban sociology
- Feudal fragmentation, in European history
- Habitat fragmentation, in an organism's preferred environment
- Market fragmentation, the existence of multiple incompatible technologies in a single market segment
- Population fragmentation, a form of population segregation
- Fragmented (album), a 2006 album by band Up Dharma Down
- Fragmentation function, a probability function

== See also ==
- Divergence
- Fragment (disambiguation)
- Separation (disambiguation)
