= Fat object =

Fat object may refer to:

- Fat object (geometry), a multi-dimensional geometrical object in mathematics
- Fat object (binary), a fat binary type of file in computing

== See also ==
- Fat pointer
