= Schattner =

Schattner is a surname. Notable people with this surname include:

- Bernd Schattner (born 1968), German politician
- Heinz Schattner (1912–1954), German weightlifter

== See also ==
- Shatner, surname
