= Separatrix =

Separatrix (from Latin, the feminine form of "separator") may refer to:

- Separatrix (decimal mark), an ⟨L⟩ mark or vertical bar ⟨|⟩ formerly used as a decimal point
- Separatrix, a proofreader's mark resembling the slash ⟨/⟩
- Separatrix in math, the boundary separating two modes of behaviour in a differential equation
- A mechanism for magnetically limiting a plasma, and hence for controlling the nuclear fusion in a tokamak; see divertor

== See also ==
- Separator (disambiguation)
