= Automatic label placement =

Automatic label placement, sometimes called text placement or name placement, comprises the computer methods of placing labels automatically on a map or chart. This is related to the typographic design of such labels.

The typical features depicted on a geographic map are line features (e.g. roads), area features (countries, parcels, forests, lakes, etc.), and point features (villages, cities, etc.). In addition to depicting the map's features in a geographically accurate manner, it is of critical importance to place the names that identify these features, in a way that the reader knows instantly which name describes which feature.

Automatic text placement is one of the most difficult, complex, and time-consuming problems in mapmaking and GIS (Geographic Information System). Other kinds of computer-generated graphics – like charts, graphs etc. – require good placement of labels as well, not to mention engineering drawings, and professional programs which produce these drawings and charts, like spreadsheets (e.g. Microsoft Excel) or computational software programs (e.g. Mathematica).

Naively placed labels overlap excessively, resulting in a map that is difficult or even impossible to read. Therefore, a GIS must allow a few possible placements of each label, and often also an option of resizing, rotating, or even removing (suppressing) the label. Then, it selects a set of placements that results in the least overlap, and has other desirable properties. For all but the most trivial setups, the problem is NP-hard.

== Rule-based algorithms ==
Rule-based algorithms try to emulate an experienced human cartographer. Over centuries, cartographers have developed the art of mapmaking and label placement. For example, an experienced cartographer repeats road names several times for long roads, instead of placing them once, or in the case of Ocean City depicted by a point very close to the shore, the cartographer would place the label "Ocean City" over the land to emphasize that it is a coastal town.

Cartographers work based on accepted conventions and rules, such as those itemized by Swiss cartographer Eduard Imhof in 1962. For example, New York City, Vienna, Berlin, Paris, or Tokyo must show up on country maps because they are high-priority labels. Once those are placed, the cartographer places the next most important class of labels, for example major roads, rivers, and other large cities. In every step they ensure that (1) the text is placed in a way that the reader easily associates it with the feature, and (2) the label does not overlap with those already placed on the map.

However, if a particular label placement problem can be formulated as a mathematical optimization problem, using mathematics to solve the problem is usually better than using a rule-based algorithm.

== Local optimization algorithms ==
The simplest greedy algorithm places consecutive labels on the map in positions that result in minimal overlap of labels. Its results are not perfect even for very simple problems, but it is extremely fast.

Slightly more complex algorithms rely on local optimization to reach a local optimum of a placement evaluation function – in each iteration placement of a single label is moved to another position, and if it improves the result, the move is preserved. It performs reasonably well for maps that are not too densely labelled. Slightly more complex variations try moving 2 or more labels at the same time. The algorithm ends after reaching some local optimum.

A simple algorithm – simulated annealing – yields good results with relatively good performance. It works like local optimization, but it may keep a change even if it worsens the result. The chance of keeping such a change is $\exp \frac{-\Delta E}{T}$, where $\Delta E$ is the change in the evaluation function, and $T$ is the temperature. The temperature is gradually lowered according to the annealing schedule. When the temperature is high, simulated annealing performs almost random changes to the label placement, being able to escape a local optimum. Later, when hopefully a very good local optimum has been found, it behaves in a manner similar to local optimization. The main challenges in developing a simulated annealing solution are choosing a good evaluation function and a good annealing schedule. Generally too fast cooling will degrade the solution, and too slow cooling will degrade the performance, but the schedule is usually quite a complex algorithm, with more than just one parameter.

Another class of direct search algorithms are the various evolutionary algorithms, e.g. genetic algorithms.

== Divide-and-conquer algorithms ==
One simple optimization that is important on real maps is dividing a set of labels into smaller sets that can be solved independently. Two labels are rivals if they can overlap in one of the possible placements. Transitive closure of this relation divides the set of labels into possibly much smaller sets. On uniformly and densely labelled maps, usually the single set will contain the majority of labels, and on maps for which the labelling is not uniform it may bring very big performance benefits. For example, when labelling a map of the world, America is labelled independently from Eurasia etc.

== 2-satisfiability algorithms ==
If a map labeling problem can be reduced to a situation in which each remaining label has only two potential positions in which it can be placed, then it may be solved efficiently by using an instance of 2-satisfiability to find a placement avoiding any conflicting pairs of placements; several exact and approximate label placement algorithms for more complex types of problems are based on this principle.

== Other algorithms ==
Automatic label placement algorithms can use any of the algorithms for finding the maximum disjoint set from the set of potential labels. Other algorithms can also be used, like various graph solutions, integer programming etc.

== Integer Programming ==
Some versions of the map label placement problem can be formulated as multiple choices integer programming (MCIP) problems where the objective function is to minimize the sum of numerical penalties for moving individual labels away from their optimal placement to avoid overlaps. The problem constraints are that each label be placed in one of a finite number of allowed positions on the map. (Or deleted from the map to allow other labels to be placed.)

A close to optimal solution to this MCIP can usually be found in a practical amount of computer time using Lagrangian relaxation to solve the dual formulation of the optimization problem.

The first commercial solution to the map label problem, formulated as a MCIP problem and solved by Lagrangian relaxation, was to place well and seismic shot point labels on petroleum industry base maps.

Since that first solution was published there have many other mathematical optimization algorithms proposed and used to solve this MCIP for other cartographic applications.
