= Shattered =

Shattered may refer to:

== Books ==
- Shattered (Casey book), a 2010 non-fiction book: true-crime account of pregnant mother's murder
- Shattered (Francis novel), a 2000 novel by Dick Francis: glassblower seeks videotape following death of jockey
- Shattered (Koontz novel), a 1973 novel by Dean Koontz: family on road trip pursued by psychopath
- Shattered (Walters novel), a 2006 novel by Eric Walters: spoiled teen put to work in a soup kitchen
- Shattered, a 2014 novel by Kevin Hearne: urban fantasy in the Iron Druid universe
- Shattered: Inside Hillary Clinton's Doomed Campaign, a 2017 non-fiction book by Amie Parnes and Jonathan Allen

== Film ==
- Shattered (1921 film), a German silent film
- Shattered (1972 film), a British film directed by Alastair Reid, most commonly known as Something to Hide
- Shattered (1991 film), an American film directed by Wolfgang Petersen
- Shattered (2007 film), a Canadian film directed by Mike Barker, most commonly known as Butterfly on a Wheel
- Shattered (2011 film), a Nigerian film
- Shattered (2022 film), a 2022 American thriller film directed by Luis Prieto

== Television ==
- Shattered (Canadian TV series), a 2010 police procedural series
- Shattered (British TV series), a 2004 reality television show shown on Channel 4
- "Shattered" (Star Trek: Voyager), an episode of the TV series Star Trek: Voyager
- "Shattered" (Star Wars: The Clone Wars)
- "Shattered!", a 2025 episode of the web series Battle for Dream Island
- "Shattered!", an episode of the TV series Sonic Prime

== Music ==
=== Albums ===
- Shattered (album), a 2006 singles compilation album by The Exploding Hearts
- Shattered (EP), a 2008 EP by Matisyahu

=== Songs ===
- "Shattered" (song), a song by The Rolling Stones from Some Girls 1978
- "Shattered", a song by Linda Ronstadt from Cry Like a Rainstorm, Howl Like the Wind 1989
- "Shattered", a song by Pantera from Cowboys from Hell 1990
- "Shattered", a song by Stratovarius from Dreamspace 1994
- "Shattered", a song by The Cranberries from Bury the Hatchet 1998
- "Shattered", a song by The Haunted from The Haunted 1998
- "Shattered", a song by The Trucks from The Trucks 2006
- "Shattered", a song by Backstreet Boys from This Is Us 2009
- "Shattered (Turn the Car Around)", a single by O.A.R. from All Sides 2008

== Other uses ==
- Shattered – Tale of the Forgotten King, a video game
- "SHAttered", a hash collision attack on SHA-1 algorithm
- Shattered set, a concept in mathematics, especially Vapnik–Chervonenkis theory

== See also ==
- Shatter (disambiguation)
