= Fraktur (disambiguation) =

Fraktur is a specific style of blackletter typeface.

Fraktur may also refer to:

- Fraktur (folk art), a kind of Pennsylvania German folk art
- Fraktur, a 2009 short film by Hans Steinbichler
- Fraktur, a minor Marvel Comics character appearing as a member of the fictitious Nova Corps

== See also ==
- Fracture (disambiguation)
