= Segregation =

Segregation may refer to:

== Separation of people ==
- Geographical segregation, rates of two or more populations which are not homogenous throughout a defined space
- School segregation
- Housing segregation
- Racial segregation, separation of humans into racial groups in daily life
  - Racial segregation in the United States
- Religious segregation, the separation of people according to their religion
- Residential segregation, the physical separation of two or more groups into different neighbourhoods
- Sex segregation, the physical, legal, and cultural separation of people according to their biological sex
- Occupational segregation, the distribution of people based upon demographic characteristics, most often gender, both across and within occupations and jobs
- Age segregation, separation of people based on their age and may be observed in many aspects of some societies
- Health segregation - see quarantine and isolation (health care). Segregation of the general public according to compliance with mandated measures issued by public health authorities, as per the global response to COVID-19 during 2020-2022.
- Segregation of inmates in prisons - see protective custody and solitary confinement.

== Separation of objects ==
- Segregation in materials, enrichment of a material constituent at a free surface or an internal interface of a material
- Particle segregation, tendency of particulate solids to segregate by size, density, shape, and other properties
- Magnetic-activated cell sorting, a method for separation of various cell populations depending on their surface antigens

== Other uses ==
- Segregate (taxonomy), created when a taxon is split off from another taxon
- Segregated early weaning, early separation of piglet and mother in pig farming
- Chromosome segregation, the process that occurs during cell division whereby chromosomes separate and migrate to opposite ends of the cell
- Mendel's law of segregation, observation in Mendelian inheritance that each parent passes only one allele to its offspring
- Security segregation, regulatory rules requiring that customer assets be held separate from assets of a brokerage firm, on the broker's books
- Segregated cycle facilities, marked lanes, tracks, shoulders and paths designated for use by bicyclists
- Trail segregation, the practice of designating certain trails as having a specific preferred or exclusive use

== See also ==
- Segment (disambiguation)
- Separate (disambiguation)
