= Separatist (disambiguation) =

A separatist is an advocate of a state of separation for a group of people from a larger group.

Separatist or separatists may also refer to:

- Separatist Crisis (Star Wars), a plot element of the film Star Wars Episode I: The Phantom Menace and sequels
- Separatist feminism, a form of radical feminism that focuses exclusively on women and girls
- Separatist Puritan, English Puritan who advocated complete separation from the Church of England
  - See also Ecclesiastical separatism and English Dissenters (also known as "English Separatists")
- Separatists of Zoar, German religious dissenters who founded the city of Zoar, Ohio, US
- Advocates of separation of church and state
- Separatist (band), an Australian Christian metal band

== See also ==
- Secession (disambiguation)
