= Fracture (company) =

Coordinates: 29.77548°N 82.44079°W

- Website type: photo
- Website: FractureMe.com
- Commercial: Yes
- Launched: November 2009
- Current status: Active

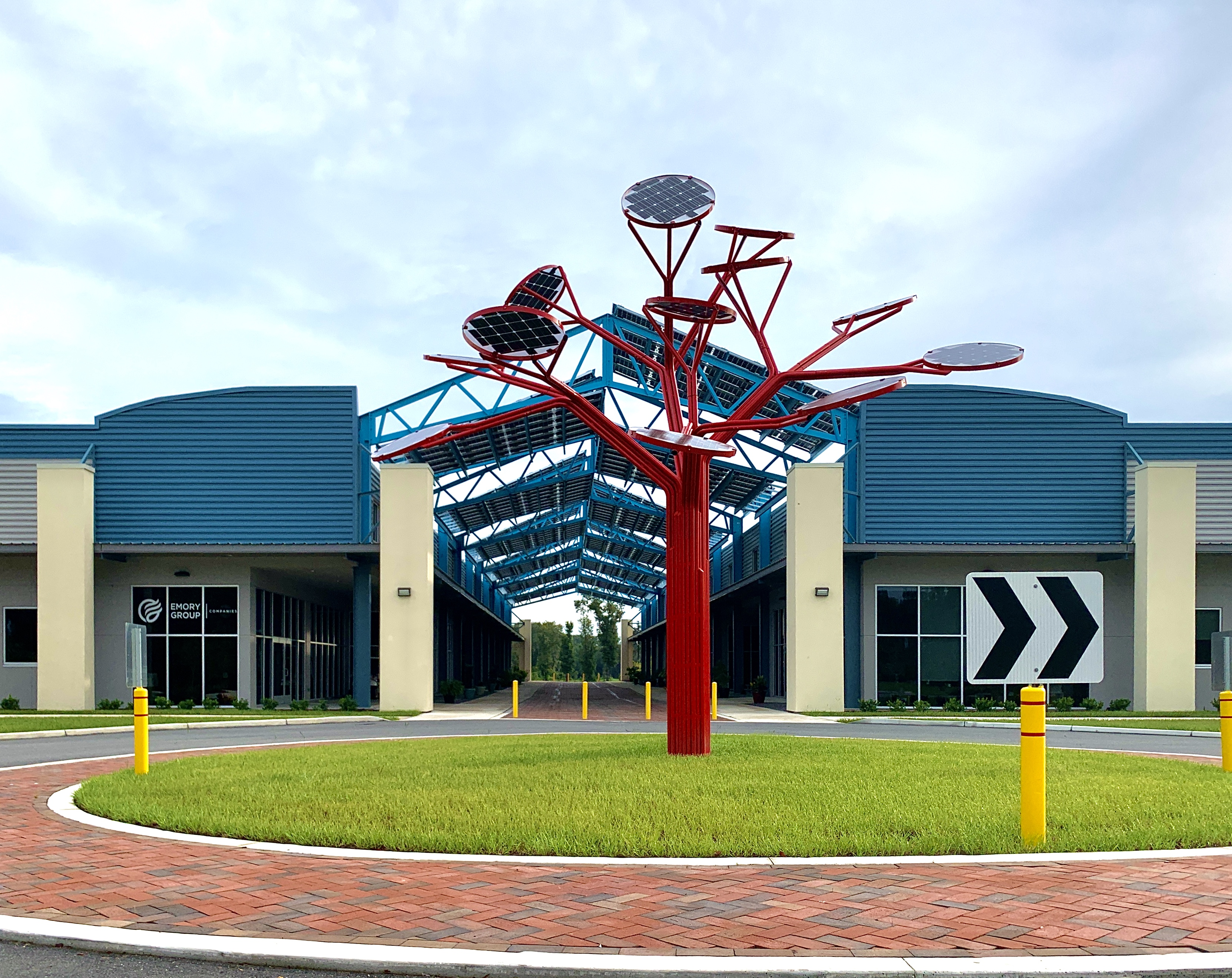
San Felasco Tech City, where Fracture has its principal office

Fracture is an Internet-based photo finishing service. Fracture's main service is printing photos directly onto glass. The company is based in Gainesville, Florida.

== History ==
A startup company in North Central Florida, Fracture was founded by two graduates of The University of Florida, Alex Theodore and Abhi Lokesh. They began selling their product in December 2009. Theodore and Lokesh raised $1.5 million in funding from outside investors, including Tamiami Angel Fund I in 2012.

In 2011, following a Groupon promotion, sales increased significantly and the company moved to a larger building, employing ten people. In 2013, the company raised an additional $500,000 for further expansion.

By 2014, the company had filled about 50,000 orders.

By July 2015, the company had filled over 100,000 orders.

In September 2019, Fracture moved into a new 30,000 square foot office space in Alachua, Florida as the anchor company of San Felasco Tech City, a live-work-play development powered by world’s largest array of bifacial solar and five first-of-its-kind solar trees.

== Features ==
Customers upload photos through the company's website and get back those photos printed on a pane of shatter resistant glass. The process takes less than an hour, and the photos can be as small as 5 by 5 in (127 by 127 mm) or as big as 21.6 by 28.8 in (549 by 732 mm).

== See also ==
- Photo printing
