= Secession of Quebec =

Secession of Quebec may refer to:

- Reference Re Secession of Quebec, a 1998 opinion by the Supreme Court of Canada
- An aim of the Quebec sovereignty movement
