= Fragmentation (medicine) =

Operation that breaks solid matter into pieces

In medicine, fragmentation is an operation that breaks of solid matter in a body part into pieces. Physical force (e.g., manual force, ultrasonic force), applied directly or indirectly through intervening body parts, is used to break down the solid matter into pieces. The solid matter may be an abnormal by-product of a biological function, or a foreign body. The pieces of solid matter are not taken out, but are eliminated or absorbed through normal biological functions. Examples would be the fragmentation of kidney and urinary bladder stones (nephrolithiasis and urolithiasis, respectively) by procedures such as shock-wave lithotripsy, laser lithotripsy, transurethral lithotripsy, and burst wave lithotripsy.

The code for fragmentation in ICD-10-PCS is 0FF.
