= Helge Tverberg =

Norwegian mathematician (1935–2020)

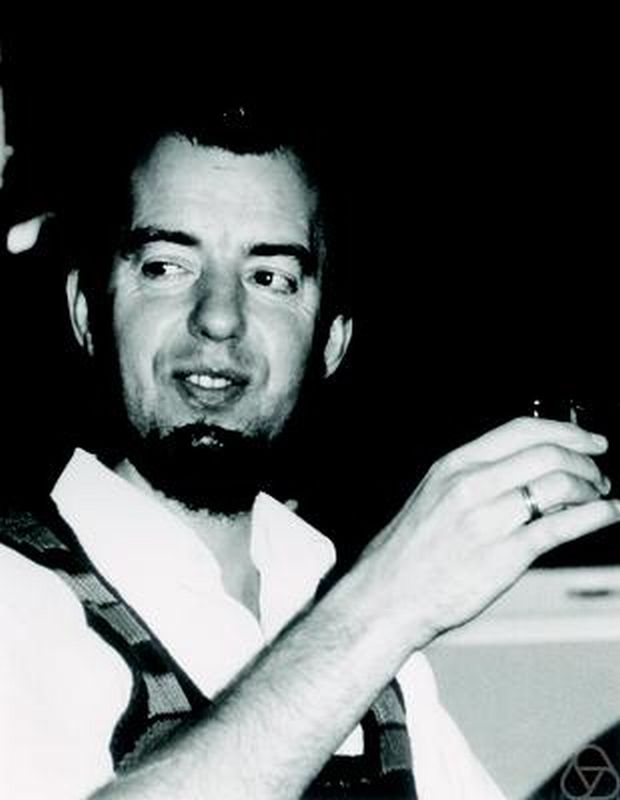
Helge Tverberg at Oberwolfach in 1981

Helge Arnulf Tverberg (March 6, 1935 – December 28, 2020) was a Norwegian mathematician. He was a professor in the Mathematics Department at the University of Bergen, his speciality being combinatorics; he retired at the mandatory age of seventy.

He was born in Bergen. He took the cand.real. degree at the University of Bergen in 1958, and the dr.philos. degree in 1968. He was a lecturer from 1958 to 1971 and professor from 1971 to his retirement in 2005. He was a visiting scholar at the University of Reading in 1966 and at the Australian National University, in Canberra, from 1980 to 1981, 1987 to 1988 and in 2004. He was a member of the Norwegian Academy of Science and Letters.

Tverberg, in 1965, proved a result on intersection patterns of partitions of point configurations that has come to be known as Tverberg's partition theorem. It inaugurated a new branch of combinatorial geometry, with many variations and applications. An account by Günter M. Ziegler of Tverberg's work in this direction appeared in the issue of the Notices of the American Mathematical Society for April, 2011.

== See also ==
- Geometric separator
