= Aventine Secession =

Aventine Secession may refer to:

- Aventine Secession (494 BC)
- Aventine Secession (20th century)
