= Fractured (Yates book) =

2021 book by Jon Yates

Fractured: Why Our Societies are Coming Apart and how We Put Them Back Together Again
- Author: Jon Yates
- Publisher: HarperCollins
- Publication date: June 10, 2021
- ISBN: 9780008463977

Fractured: why our societies are coming apart and how we put them back together again is a non-fiction book by Jon Yates, first published in Manchester in 2021 by HarperNorth.

== Summary ==
The premises of the book are that humans have a cognitive bias to homophily (that is, to favour and surround themselves with other people who are like themselves, dubbed 'People Like Me syndrome' by Yates), and that societies conversely tend to develop institutions to ensure what Yates calls a 'Common Life' (in which people have more heterogeneous friendships and ties). Yates's key example of such an institution in a hunter-gatherer society, and a recurrent reference point in the book, is the custom of the epeme dance in Hadza culture. Yates posits that conditions of rapid social change can render Common-Life institutions obsolete; that the consequent weakening of Common-Life institutions leads to individuals' social circles growing more homogeneous; and that the tendency to more homogeneous social circles in turn reduces social cohesion. Writing in the wake of Brexit and the polarisation of the USA's politics characterised by the election of Donald Trump, Yates argues that reduction in social cohesion leads to rising inequality and social instability, as less privileged sections of society lack acquaintances who can encourage and support their aspirations while different sections of society lack acquaintance with, understanding of, and empathy for others' views and needs.

Yates's principal example of the process of collapse and repair in social cohesion is the rapid early nineteenth-century urbanisation associated with the Industrial Revolution in Britain and the USA, which uprooted people from their rural communities and rendered traditional Common-Life institutions irrelevant. Yates observes that voluntary associations, clubs, and societies (such as trade unions, religious organisations, and interest groups) grew dramatically in the later nineteenth century, alongside mandatory social institutions such as compulsory school-attendance and military service. Yates argues that these institutions re-established an urban common life, underpinning rising equality in the decades around the mid-twentieth century.

Yates argues that Common-Life institutions tend to change slowly, and that rapid social changes in Britain and the USA in the decades leading up to the publication of the book have led to collapsing participation in older voluntary associations. Factors particularly identified by Yates include falling participation in religious life, rising individualism, growing choice over schools and careers, greater social diversity (which, paradoxically, makes it easier for people to find others who are especially like themselves), and people's preference for watching television over personal interaction (Yates views the phenomenon of the social media bubble as an extreme but relatively unimportant symptom of this trend).

While suggesting that societies will evolve new Common-Life institutions in time, Yates presents two main models for policy responses to runaway homophily. One is a Nordic model, whose approach, in Yates's view, is to slow the pace of social change to a rate that enables Common-Life institutions to adapt and remain strong. Yates is sceptical that the Nordic Model can keep up with the current pace of change or that Britain and the USA can implement the model. He instead points to government policy in post-independence Singapore, which he characterises as a 'strengthened society', in which ethnic strife was avoided not (primarily) by constitutional checks and balances, but by quotas ensuring that people from different ethnic groups lived alongside each other, undertook national service together, and were educated together. Yates justifies the restrictions to freedom that these policies entail by arguing that they avert greater harms.

== Reviews ==
- Zoe Williams, 'People Unlike Me: A New Recipe for Social Cohesion', The Times Literary Supplement (30 July 2021).
- Anna Leszkiewicz, Leo Robson and Lola Seaton, 'Reviewed in Short: New books by Jon Yates, Lucy Ellmann, Denton Welch and Brandon Taylor', The New Statesman (31 July 2021).
- Cann, Paul, 'Fractured: Why Our Societies Are Coming Apart and How We Can Put Them Back Together Again John Yates', HarperCollins, Manchester, UK, 2021, 352 Pp., Hbk £20.00, ISBN 9780008463960, Ageing and Society, 42 (2022), 2968–69; doi:10.1017/S0144686X22000782.
