= Fragment (novel) =

2009 novel by Warren Fahy

- Author: Warren Fahy
- Publisher: Delacorte Press
- ISBN: 978-0-553-80753-0

Fragment (2009) is a science-based thriller by author and screenwriter Warren Fahy. The novel focuses on a crew of young scientists from a reality TV show who must try to survive when their research vessel, the Trident, lands on Henders Island, where predatory creatures have been living and evolving for over half a billion years. Producer Lloyd Levin optioned Fahy's screenplay adaptation of Fragment for a major motion picture. Pandemonium, Fahy's sequel to Fragment, was published in March 2013.

== Plot summary ==
In 1791, Captain Ambrose Henders and his crew stop at a tiny island in search of fresh water in the South Pacific. After one man, Henry Frears, is sent to obtain water, Captain Henders is forced to retreat to prevent more loss of life when Frears is eaten by unknown creatures. He writes of the account in his journal.

In the present day, an exploratory research vessel "The Trident" sails across the same stretch of the Pacific filming for a documentary series called "Sea life". When Captain Sol picks up an EPIRB distress beacon, The crew decides to investigate. They set ashore to scope out the shipwrecked "Balboa Bilbo", from which the distress beacon emanated. After arriving at the wreck, the crew are attacked by monstrous creatures. In the ensuing chaos, a camera captures the deaths of nearly all the crew as the rest of the world watches on a live feed. Researcher Nell Duckworth and cameraman Zero barely manage to escape with their lives.

Eight days after the "Sea Life" incident, Nell has been called back to Henders Island, after the live feed caused panic and forced the U.S. military to quarantine the island for study. After several attempts, a few live specimens are captured. During examination, they turn out to be highly specialized arthropods new to science. Various tests are performed, including tests on live plants and animals. Among these, a mongoose is released into the jungle wearing a "critter cam" in an attempt to compare the Henders Island fauna to invasive fauna from different areas of the world. The mongoose does not survive for more than a few minutes, as with the other specimens pitted against the island's creatures.

As a result, it is revealed the animals of Henders Island are able to reproduce continuously, and are stronger and faster than any other creatures on earth due to their copper-based blood, two brains and their super adaptability, as demonstrated during the tests involving rival species that have been imported. Nell and Dr. Livingstone present their report on the Island's formation and evolution to the military and the President of the United States, and reveal a horrifying truth; Henders Island's flora and fauna are so well adapted that if they were to escape, they would cause global collapse. The only reason it hasn't yet occurred is because seawater is toxic to the wildlife on the island.

The destruction of the island is approved, but before it can occur, Nell and the others must deal with the mysterious entities that have been observing them. These creatures, referred to as Sels, or "Hendropods", are five sentient, highly intelligent creatures that have become biologically immortal due to their ability to turn invisible. It is revealed that they were the ones, specifically the individual known as Hender (their leader), who triggered the SOS on the Balboa Bilbo, as the Hendropods realized the island was sinking due to earthquakes. With Hender's help, Nell and her team manage to escape, bringing the Hendropods along back to "The Trident". However, one scientist, the hypocritical and murderous Thatcher Redmond, tries to release Henders Island creatures aboard the ship, believing intelligent life of any kind is a threat to life on earth. Though he escapes on a raft away from "The Trident", Redmond is eaten by fauna he accidentally unleashes on himself in the raft. The island is also destroyed by a nuclear warhead. After the Hendropods kill the deadly wildlife Thatcher unleashed to protect their human allies, a brief standoff occurs with the US Military and the Hendropods reveal themselves to stop the escalation. In the aftermath, the Hendropods are given sanctuary by humanity, with the two species now having to learn how to share the world together.
