= Shatner =

Shatner is a surname. Notable people with the surname include:

- Melanie Shatner (born 1964), American actress, daughter of William Shatner
- Mordechai Shatner (1904–1964), Zionist activist and a signatory of the Israeli declaration of independence
- William Shatner (born 1931), Canadian actor, recording artist, and author

== See also ==
- Schattner, surname
