= Fragment =

Fragment(s) may refer to:

== Computing and logic ==
- Fragment (computer graphics), all the data necessary to generate a pixel in the frame buffer
- Fragment (logic), a syntactically restricted subset of a logical language
- URI fragment, the component of a URL following the "#" that identifies a portion of a larger document

== Film and television ==
- Fragments (film), or Winged Creatures, a 2008 American film
- Fragments: Chronicle of a Vanishing, a 1991 Croatian film
- "The Fragment" (Dynasty), a 1982 TV episode
- "Fragments" (Magnum, P.I.), a 1984 TV episode
- "Fragments" (Sanctuary), a 2009 TV episode
- "Fragments" (Steven Universe Future), a 2020 TV episode
- "Fragments" (Torchwood), a 2008 TV episode

== Literature and writing ==
- Literary fragment, a brief or unfinished work of prose
- Manuscript fragment, a remnant of a handwritten book
- Sentence fragment, a sentence not containing a subject or a predicate
- Fragment (novel), a 2009 novel by Warren Fahy
- Fragments (novel), a 2013 novel by Dan Wells
- Fragments (magazine), an 1881–1916 Russian humor, literature, and art magazine
- Fragments: Memories of a Wartime Childhood, a 1995 fictional memoir of Holocaust survival by Binjamin Wilkomirski
- Fragments, a 1993 play by Edward Albee

== Music ==
=== Albums ===
- Fragments (Bonobo album), 2022
- Fragments (Paul Bley album), 1987
- The Bootleg Series Vol. 17: Fragments – Time Out of Mind Sessions (1996–1997), by Bob Dylan, 2023
- Fragments, by Jakob Sveistrup, 2006
- Fragments (EP), by Rapids!, 2011
- Fragments, an EP by Chipzel, 2012
- Fragments, an EP by Clara Benin, 2020

=== Songs ===
- "Fragments" (song), by Jack Johnson, 2017
- "Fragment", by haloblack from Funkyhell, 1996
- "Fragments", by Blondie from Pollinator, 2017
- "Fragments", by the Who from Endless Wire, 2006
- "Fragments", by Yeule from Glitch Princess, 2022
- "Fragments", by Joji from Piss in the Wind, 2026

== Other uses ==
- .hack//frägment, an online and offline RPG from the .hack video game series
- Fragments Collection, a 2005–2012 sculpture series by Blake Ward

== See also ==
- Fragmentation (disambiguation)
- Part (disambiguation)
- Splinter (disambiguation)
