= Fraction (disambiguation) =

A fraction is one or more equal parts of something.

Fraction may also refer to:

- Fraction (chemistry), a quantity of a substance collected by fractionation
- Fraction (floating point number), an (ambiguous) term sometimes used to specify a part of a floating point number
- Fraction (politics), a subgroup within a parliamentary party
- Fraction (radiation therapy), one unit of treatment of the total radiation dose of radiation therapy that is split into multiple treatment sessions
- Fraction (religion), the ceremonial act of breaking the bread during Christian Communion

== People with the surname ==
- Matt Fraction, a comic book author

== See also ==
- Algebraic fraction, an indicated division in which the divisor, or both dividend and divisor, are algebraic expressions
  - Irrational fraction, a type of algebraic fraction
- Faction (disambiguation)
- Frazione, a type of administrative division of an Italian commune
- Free and Independent Fraction, a Romanian political party
- Part (disambiguation)
- Ratio
