= Separation theorem =

Separation theorem may refer to several theorems in different fields.

== Economics ==
- Fisher separation theorem (corporation theory) - asserts that the objective of a corporation will be the maximization of its present value, regardless of the preferences of its shareholders.
- Mutual fund separation theorem (portfolio theory) states that, under certain conditions, any investor's optimal portfolio can be constructed by holding each of certain mutual funds in appropriate ratios, where the number of mutual funds is smaller than the number of individual assets in the portfolio.

== Mathematics ==
- Gabbay's separation theorem (mathematical logic and computer science) states that any arbitrary temporal logic formula can be rewritten in a logically equivalent "past → future" form.
- Planar separator theorem (graph theory) states that any planar graph can be split into smaller pieces by removing a small number of vertices.
- Lusin's separation theorem (descriptive set theory) states that for any two disjoint analytic subsets of a Polish space there is a Borel subset containing one but disjoint from the other.

== Geometry ==
- Hyperplane separation theorem - either of two theorems about disjoint convex sets in n-dimensional Euclidean space. Also known as: Separating axis theorem.
- Geometric separator theorems - theorems regarding the existence of lines separating objects in the plane without harming too many of them.
- Guillotine separation theorems - theorems regarding the possibility of separating objects in the plane using guillotine-cuts.
