= Separate =

Separate or separates may refer to:

== Arts and entertainment ==
- Separate (song), 2016, by Amanda Black
- "Separate", a song by Pvris from All We Know of Heaven, All We Need of Hell, 2017
- Separates (album), 1978, by 999
- Separate Tables, a 1954 play by Terence Rattigan

== Religion ==
- Separate Baptists, an 18th-century American Christian movement
  - Separate Baptists in Christ, a subdenomination and faith organization (founded 1776)

== Other uses ==
- Separates (clothing), mix-and-match sets of garments
- Soil separates, the three mineral particles: sand, silt, and clay

== See also ==
- Separation (disambiguation)
