= Fat object (geometry) =

Multi-dimensional object whose lengths in each dimension are similar

In geometry, a fat object is an object in two or more dimensions, whose lengths in the different dimensions are similar. For example, a square is fat because its length and width are identical. A 2-by-1 rectangle is thinner than a square, but it is fat relative to a 10-by-1 rectangle. Similarly, a circle is fatter than a 1-by-10 ellipse and an equilateral triangle is fatter than a very obtuse triangle.

Fat objects are especially important in computational geometry. Many algorithms in computational geometry can perform much better if their input consists of only fat objects; see the applications section below.

== Global fatness ==
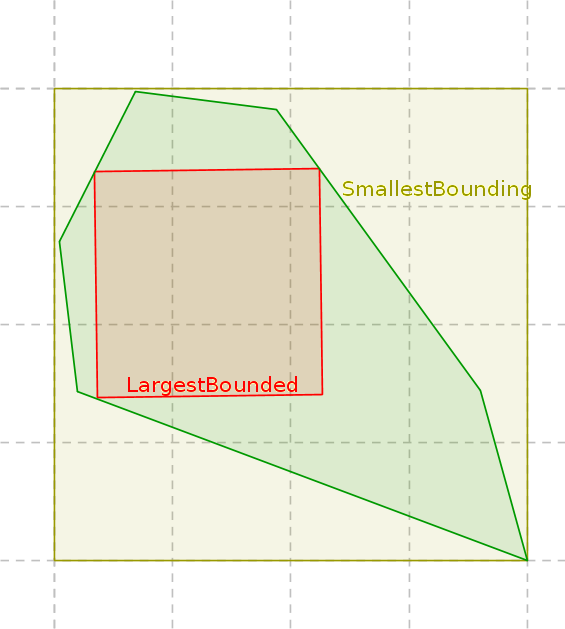

Given a constant R ≥ 1, an object o is called R-fat if its "slimness factor" is at most R. The "slimness factor" has different definitions in different papers. A common definition is:

$$\frac{\text{side of smallest cube enclosing} \ o}{\text{side of largest cube enclosed in} \ o}$$

where o and the cubes are d-dimensional. A 2-dimensional cube is a square, so the slimness factor of a square is 1 (since its smallest enclosing square is the same as its largest enclosed disk). The slimness factor of a 10-by-1 rectangle is 10. The slimness factor of a circle is √2. Hence, by this definition, a square is 1-fat but a disk and a 10×1 rectangle are not 1-fat. A square is also 2-fat (since its slimness factor is less than 2), 3-fat, etc. A disk is also 2-fat (and also 3-fat etc.), but a 10×1 rectangle is not 2-fat. Every shape is ∞-fat, since by definition the slimness factor is always at most ∞.

The above definition can be termed two-cubes fatness since it is based on the ratio between the side-lengths of two cubes. Similarly, it is possible to define two-balls fatness, in which a d-dimensional ball is used instead. A 2-dimensional ball is a disk. According to this alternative definition, a disk is 1-fat but a square is not 1-fat, since its two-balls-slimness is √2.

An alternative definition, that can be termed enclosing-ball fatness (also called "thickness") is based on the following slimness factor:

$$\left(\frac{\text{volume of smallest ball enclosing} \ o}{\text{volume of} \ o}\right)^{1/d}$$

The exponent 1/d makes this definition a ratio of two lengths, so that it is comparable to the two-balls-fatness.

Here, too, a cube can be used instead of a ball.

Similarly it is possible to define the enclosed-ball fatness based on the following slimness factor:

$$\left(\frac{\text{volume of} \ o}{\text{volume of largest  ball enclosed in} \ o}\right)^{1/d}$$

=== Enclosing-fatness vs. enclosed-fatness ===
The enclosing-ball/cube-slimness might be very different from the enclosed-ball/cube-slimness.

For example, consider a lollipop with a candy in the shape of a 1 × 1 square and a stick in the shape of a b × 1/b rectangle (with b > 1 > 1/b). As b increases, the area of the enclosing cube (≈ b^{2}) increases, but the area of the enclosed cube remains constant (=1) and the total area of the shape also remains constant (=2). Thus the enclosing-cube-slimness can grow arbitrarily while the enclosed-cube-slimness remains constant (=√2). See this GeoGebra page for a demonstration.

On the other hand, consider a rectilinear 'snake' with width 1/b and length b, that is entirely folded within a square of side length 1. As b increases, the area of the enclosed cube (≈ 1/b^{2}) decreases, but the total areas of the snake and of the enclosing cube remain constant (=1). Thus the enclosed-cube-slimness can grow arbitrarily while the enclosing-cube-slimness remains constant (=1).

With both the lollipop and the snake, the two-cubes-slimness grows arbitrarily, since in general:

$$\left({\text{enclosing-ball-} \atop \text{slimness}}\right) \times \left({\text{enclosed-ball-} \atop \text{slimness}}\right) = \left({\text{two-balls-} \atop \text{slimness}}\right)$$
$$\left({\text{enclosing-cube-} \atop \text{slimness}}\right) \times \left({\text{enclosed-cube-} \atop \text{slimness}}\right) = \left({\text{two-cubes-} \atop \text{slimness}}\right)$$

Since all slimness factor are at least 1, it follows that if an object o is R-fat according to the two-balls/cubes definition, it is also R-fat according to the enclosing-ball/cube and enclosed-ball/cube definitions (but the opposite is not true, as exemplified above).

=== Balls vs. cubes ===
The volume of a d-dimensional ball of radius r is: $V_d\cdot r^d,$ where V_{d} is a dimension-dependent constant:
$$V_d = \frac{\pi^{d/2}}{\Gamma \left(\frac{d}{2} + 1 \right)}$$

A d-dimensional cube with side-length 2a has volume (2a)^{d}. It is enclosed in a d-dimensional ball with radius $a\sqrt d$ whose volume is $V_d \left(a\sqrt d \right)^d.$ Hence for every d-dimensional object:

$$\left({\text{enclosing-ball-} \atop \text{slimness}}\right) \leq \left({\text{enclosing-cube-} \atop \text{slimness}}\right) \times \sqrt[d]{V_d} \times \frac{\sqrt d}{2}$$

For even dimensions (d = 2k), the factor simplifies to: $\sqrt\tfrac{\pi k}{2} \left/ \sqrt[2k]{k!} \right. .$ In particular, for two-dimensional shapes V_{2} = π and the factor is: $\sqrt{\tfrac{\pi}{2}} \approx 1.25,$ so:

$$\left({\text{enclosing-disk-} \atop \text{slimness}}\right) \leq \left({\text{enclosing-square-} \atop \text{slimness}}\right) \times 1.25$$

From similar considerations:

$$\left({\text{enclosed-cube-} \atop \text{slimness}}\right) \leq \left({\text{enclosed-ball-} \atop \text{slimness}}\right) \times \sqrt[d]{V_d} \times \frac{\sqrt d}{2}$$
$$\left({\text{enclosed-square-} \atop \text{slimness}}\right) \leq \left({\text{enclosed-disk-} \atop \text{slimness}}\right) \times 1.25$$

A d-dimensional ball with radius a is enclosed in a d-dimensional cube with side-length 2a. Hence for every d-dimensional object:

$$\left({\text{enclosing-cube-} \atop \text{slimness}}\right) \leq \left({\text{enclosing-ball-} \atop \text{slimness}}\right) \times \frac{2}{\sqrt[d]{V_d}}$$

For even dimensions (d = 2k), the factor simplifies to: $2 \left/ \sqrt[2k]{(k!)} \ \right/ \sqrt\pi.$ In particular, for two-dimensional shapes the factor is: $\tfrac{2}{\sqrt\pi} \approx 1.13,$ so:

$$\left({\text{enclosing-square-} \atop \text{slimness}}\right) \leq \left({\text{enclosing-disk-} \atop \text{slimness}}\right) \times 1.13$$

From similar considerations:

$$\left({\text{enclosed-ball-} \atop \text{slimness}}\right) \leq \left({\text{enclosed-cube-} \atop \text{slimness}}\right) \times \frac{2}{\sqrt[d]{V_d}}$$
$$\left({\text{enclosed-disk-} \atop \text{slimness}}\right) \leq \left({\text{enclosed-square-} \atop \text{slimness}}\right) \times 1.13$$

Multiplying the above relations gives the following simple relations:

$$\left({\text{two-balls-} \atop \text{slimness}}\right) \leq \left({\text{two-cubes-} \atop \text{slimness}}\right) \times \sqrt{d}$$
$$\left({\text{two-cubes-} \atop \text{slimness}}\right) \leq \left({\text{two-balls-} \atop \text{slimness}}\right) \times \sqrt{d}$$

Thus, an R-fat object according to the either the two-balls or the two-cubes definition is at most $R\sqrt d$-fat according to the alternative definition.

== Local fatness ==
The above definitions are all global in the sense that they don't care about small thin areas that are part of a large fat object.

For example, consider a lollipop with a candy in the shape of a 1 × 1 square and a stick in the shape of a 1 × 1/b rectangle (with b > 1 > 1/b). As b increases, the area of the enclosing cube (=4) and the area of the enclosed cube (=1) remain constant, while the total area of the shape changes only slightly (= 1 + 1/b). Thus all three slimness factors are bounded:

$$\begin{align}
\left({\text{enclosing-cube-} \atop \text{slimness}}\right) &\leq 2, \\[4pt]
\left({\text{enclosed-cube-} \atop \text{slimness}}\right) &\leq 2, \\[4pt]
\left({\text{two-cube-} \atop \text{slimness}}\right) &= 2.
\end{align}$$

Thus by all definitions the lollipop is 2-fat. However, the stick-part of the lollipop obviously becomes thinner and thinner.

In some applications, such thin parts are unacceptable, so local fatness, based on a local slimness factor, may be more appropriate. For every global slimness factor, it is possible to define a local version. For example, for the enclosing-ball-slimness, it is possible to define the local-enclosing-ball slimness factor of an object o by considering the set B of all balls whose center is inside o and whose boundary intersects the boundary of o (i.e. not entirely containing o). The local-enclosing-ball-slimness factor is defined as:

$$\frac{1}{2}\cdot \sup_{b \in B}\left(\frac{\text{volume} (B)}{\text{volume} (B\cap o)}\right)^{1/d}$$

The 1/2 is a normalization factor that makes the local-enclosing-ball-slimness of a ball equal to 1. The local-enclosing-ball-slimness of the lollipop-shape described above is dominated by the 1 × 1/b stick, and it goes to ∞ as b grows. Thus by the local definition the above lollipop is not 2-fat.

=== Global vs. local definitions ===
Local-fatness implies global-fatness. Here is a proof sketch for fatness based on enclosing balls. By definition, the volume of the smallest enclosing ball is ≤ the volume of any other enclosing ball. In particular, it is ≤ the volume of any enclosing ball whose center is inside o and whose boundary touches the boundary of o. But every such enclosing ball b is in the set B considered by the definition of local-enclosing-ball slimness. Hence:

$$\begin{align}
\left({\text{enclosing-ball-} \atop \text{slimness}}\right)^d
&= \frac{\text{volume(smallest enclosing ball)}}{\text{volume}(o)} \\[4pt]
&\leq \frac{\text{volume} (b \in B)}{\text{volume}(o)} \\[4pt]
&= \frac{\text{volume} (b \in B)}{\text{volume}(b \cap o)} \\[4pt]
&\leq \left[ 2 \times \left({\text{local-enclosing-} \atop \text{ball-slimness}}\right) \right]^d
\end{align}$$

Hence:

$$\left({\text{enclosing-ball-} \atop \text{slimness}}\right) \leq \left({\text{local-enclosing-} \atop \text{ball-slimness}}\right) \times 2$$

For a convex body, the opposite is also true: local-fatness implies global-fatness. The proof is based on the following lemma. Let o be a convex object. Let P be a point in o. Let b and B be two balls centered at P such that b is smaller than B. Then o intersects a larger portion of b than of B, i.e.:

$$\frac{\text{volume} \ (b \cap o)}{\text{volume} \ (b)} \geq \frac{\text{volume} \ (B \cap o)}{\text{volume} \ (B)}$$

Proof sketch: standing at the point P, we can look at different angles θ and measure the distance to the boundary of o. Because o is convex, this distance is a function, say r(θ). We can calculate the left-hand side of the inequality by integrating the following function (multiplied by some determinant function) over all angles:
$$f(\theta) = \min{\left(\frac{r(\theta)}{\text{radius} \ (b)},1 \right)}$$

Similarly we can calculate the right-hand side of the inequality by integrating the following function:
$$F(\theta) = \min{ \left(\frac{r(\theta)}{\text{radius} \ (B)},1 \right)}$$

By checking all 3 possible cases, it is possible to show that always f(θ) ≥ F(θ). Thus the integral of f is at least the integral of F, and the lemma follows.

The definition of local-enclosing-ball slimness considers all balls that are centered in a point in o and intersect the boundary of o. However, when o is convex, the above lemma allows us to consider, for each point in o, only balls that are maximal in size, i.e., only balls that entirely contain o (and whose boundary intersects the boundary of o). For every such ball b:

$$\text{volume} \ (b)\leq C_d\cdot \text{diameter} \ (o)^d$$

where C_{d} is some dimension-dependent constant.

The diameter of o is at most the diameter of the smallest ball enclosing o, and the volume of that ball is:
$$C_d \cdot \left( \frac{\text{diameter(smallest ball enclosing}\ o)}{2} \right)^d$$

Combining all inequalities gives that for every convex object:

$$\left({\text{local-enclosing-} \atop \text{ball-slimness}}\right) \leq \left({\text{enclosing-ball-} \atop \text{slimness}}\right)$$

For non-convex objects, this inequality of course doesn't hold, as exemplified by the lollipop above.

== Examples ==
The following table shows the slimness factor of various shapes based on the different definitions. The two columns of the local definitions are filled with "*" when the shape is convex (in this case, the value of the local slimness equals the value of the corresponding global slimness):

Shape	two-balls	two-cubes	enclosing-ball	enclosing-cube	enclosed-ball	enclosed-cube	local-enclosing-ball	local-enclosing-cube
square	$\sqrt 2$	$1$	$\sqrt{\frac{\pi}{2}} \approx 1.25$	$1$	$\sqrt{\frac{4}{\pi}} \approx 1.13$	$1$	*	*
b × a rectangle with b > a	$\sqrt{1+\frac{b^2}{a^2}}$	$\frac{b}{a}$	$\frac{\sqrt\pi}{2}\left(\frac{a}{b}+\frac{b}{a}\right)$	$\sqrt\frac{b}{a}$	$2\sqrt\frac{b}{a\pi}$	$\sqrt\frac{b}{a}$	*	*
disk	$1$	$\sqrt{2}$	$1$	$\sqrt\frac{4}{\pi} \approx 1.13$	$1$	$\sqrt\frac{\pi}{2} \approx 1.25$	*	*
ellipse with radii b > a	$\frac{b}{a}$	$> \frac{b}{a}$	$\sqrt\frac{b}{a}$	$> \sqrt\frac{b}{2\pi a}$	$\sqrt\frac{b}{a}$	$> \sqrt\frac{\pi b}{a}$	*	*
semi-ellipse with radii b > a, halved in parallel to b	$\frac{2b}{a}$	$> \frac{2b}{a}$	$\sqrt\frac{2b}{a}$	$> \sqrt\frac{4b}{\pi a}$	$\sqrt\frac{2b}{a}$	$>\sqrt\frac{2\pi b}{a}$	*	*
semidisk	$2$	$\sqrt{5}$	$\sqrt{2}$	$\sqrt\frac{8}{\pi} \approx 1.6$	$\sqrt 2$	$\sqrt\frac{5\pi}{8} \approx 1.4$	*	*
equilateral triangle		$1+\frac{2}{\sqrt 3} \approx 2.15$	$\sqrt\frac{\pi}{\sqrt 3} \approx 1.35$	$\sqrt\frac{4}{\sqrt 3} \approx 1.52$		$\frac{\sqrt[4]3}{2} + \frac{1}{\sqrt[4]3} \approx 1.42$	*	*
isosceles right-angled triangle	$\frac{1}{\sqrt{2}-1} \approx 2.4$	$2$		$\sqrt 2$		$\sqrt 2$	*	*
'lollipop' made of unit square and b × a stick, b > 1 > a		$b+1$		$\sqrt\frac{(b+1)^2}{ab+1}$		$\sqrt{ab+1}$		$\sqrt\frac{b}{a}$

== Fatness of a triangle ==
Slimness is invariant to scale, so the slimness factor of a triangle (as of any other polygon) can be presented as a function of its angles only. The three ball-based slimness factors can be calculated using well-known trigonometric identities.

=== Enclosed-ball slimness ===
The largest circle contained in a triangle is called its incircle. It is known that:

$$\Delta = r^2 \cdot \left(\cot \frac{\angle A}{2} + \cot \frac{\angle B}{2} + \cot \frac{\angle C}{2} \right)$$

where Δ is the area of a triangle and r is the radius of the incircle. Hence, the enclosed-ball slimness of a triangle is:

$$\sqrt{ \frac{\cot \frac{\angle A}{2} + \cot \frac{\angle B}{2} + \cot \frac{\angle C}{2}}{\pi} }$$

=== Enclosing-ball slimness ===
The smallest containing circle for an acute triangle is its circumcircle, while for an obtuse triangle it is the circle having the triangle's longest side as a diameter.

It is known that:

$$\Delta = R^2 \cdot 2 \sin A \sin B \sin C$$

where again Δ is the area of a triangle and R is the radius of the circumcircle. Hence, for an acute triangle, the enclosing-ball slimness factor is:

$$\sqrt{\frac{\pi}{2 \sin A \sin B \sin C}}$$

It is also known that:

$$\Delta = \frac{c^{2}}{2(\cot \angle{A} + \cot \angle{B})}
= \frac{c^{2}(\sin \angle{A})(\sin \angle{B})}{2\sin(\angle{A} + \angle{B})}$$

where c is any side of the triangle and A, B are the adjacent angles. Hence, for an obtuse triangle with acute angles A and B (and longest side c), the enclosing-ball slimness factor is:

$$\sqrt{\frac{\pi\cdot(\cot \angle{A} + \cot \angle{B})}{2}}
= \sqrt{\frac{\pi\cdot\sin(\angle{A} + \angle{B})}{2 (\sin \angle{A}) (\sin \angle{B})}}$$

Note that in a right triangle, $\sin{\angle{C}} = \sin(\angle{A} + \angle{B}) = 1,$ so the two expressions coincide.

=== Two-balls slimness ===
The inradius r and the circumradius R are connected via a couple of formulae which provide two alternative expressions for the two-balls slimness of an acute triangle:

$$\frac{R}{r} = \frac{1}{4 \sin\frac{\angle{A}}{2} \sin\frac{\angle{B}}{2} \sin\frac{\angle{C}}{2} }
= \frac{1}{\cos \angle{A}  + \cos \angle{B}  + \cos \angle{C} - 1}$$

For an obtuse triangle, c/2 should be used instead of R. By the law of sines:

$$\frac{c}{2} = R \sin{\angle{C}}$$

Hence the slimness factor of an obtuse triangle with obtuse angle C is:

$$\frac{c/2}{r} = \frac{\sin{\angle{C}}}{4 \sin\frac{\angle{A}}{2} \sin\frac{\angle{B}}{2} \sin\frac{\angle{C}}{2} }
= \frac{\sin{\angle{C}}}{\cos\angle{A}  + \cos\angle{B}  + \cos\angle{C} - 1}$$

Note that in a right triangle, $\sin{\angle{C}} = 1,$ so the two expressions coincide.

The two expressions can be combined in the following way to get a single expression for the two-balls slimness of any triangle with smaller angles A and B:

$$\frac{\sin{\max(\angle{A}, \angle{B}, \angle{C}, \pi/2)}}{4 \sin\frac{\angle{A}}{2} \sin\frac{\angle{B}}{2} \sin\frac{\pi - \angle{A} - \angle{B}}{2} }
= \frac{\sin{\max(\angle{A}, \angle{B}, \angle{C}, \pi/2)}}{\cos\angle{A} + \cos\angle{B} - \cos (\angle{A} + \angle{B}) - 1}$$

To get a feeling of the rate of change in fatness, consider what this formula gives for an isosceles triangle with head angle θ when θ is small:
$$\frac{\sin{\max(\theta, \pi/2)}}{4 \sin^2\frac{\pi - \theta}{4} \sin\frac{\theta}{2}} \approx \frac{1}{4 {\sqrt{1/2}}^2 \theta/2} = \frac{1}{\theta}$$

The following graphs show the 2-balls slimness factor of a triangle:

- Slimness of a general triangle when one angle (a) is a constant parameter while the other angle (x) changes.
- Slimness of an isosceles triangle as a function of its head angle (x).

== Fatness of circles, ellipses and their parts ==
The ball-based slimness of a circle is of course 1 - the smallest possible value.

For a circular segment with central angle θ, the circumcircle diameter is the length of the chord and the incircle diameter is the height of the segment, so the two-balls slimness (and its approximation when θ is small) is:
$$\frac{\text{length of chord}}{\text{height of segment}}
= \frac{2R\sin\frac{\theta}{2}}{R\left(1 - \cos\frac{\theta}{2}\right)}
= \frac{2\sin\frac{\theta}{2}}{\left(1 - \cos\frac{\theta}{2}\right)}
\approx \frac{\theta}{\theta^2/8}
= \frac{8}{\theta}$$

For a circular sector with central angle θ (when θ is small), the circumcircle diameter is the radius of the circle and the incircle diameter is the chord length, so the two-balls slimness is:
$$\frac{\text{radius of circle}}{\text{length of chord}}
= \frac{R}{2R\sin\frac{\theta}{2}}
= \frac{1}{2\sin\frac{\theta}{2}}
\approx \frac{1}{2 \theta / 2}
= \frac{1}{\theta}$$

For an ellipse, the slimness factors are different in different locations. For example, consider an ellipse with short axis a and long axis b. the length of a chord ranges between $2a\sin\tfrac{\theta}{2}$ at the narrow side of the ellipse and $2b\sin\tfrac{\theta}{2}$ at its wide side; similarly, the height of the segment ranges between $b\bigl(1 - \cos\tfrac{\theta}{2}\bigr)$ at the narrow side and $a\bigl(1 - \cos\tfrac{\theta}{2}\bigr)$ at its wide side. So the two-balls slimness ranges between:
$$\frac{2a\sin\frac{\theta}{2}}{b\left(1-\cos\frac{\theta}{2}\right)} \approx \frac{8a}{b\theta}$$

and:
$$\frac{2b\sin\frac{\theta}{2}}{a\left(1-\cos\frac{\theta}{2}\right)} \approx \frac{8b}{a\theta}$$

In general, when the secant starts at angle Θ the slimness factor can be approximated by:

$\frac{2\sin\frac{\theta}{2}}{\left(1-\cos\frac{\theta}{2}\right)}$ $\left(\frac{b}{a}\cos^2(\Theta+\frac{\theta}{2}) + \frac{a}{b}\sin^2(\Theta+\frac{\theta}{2})\right)$

== Fatness of a convex polygon ==
A convex polygon is called r-separated if the angle between each pair of edges (not necessarily adjacent) is at least r.

Lemma: The enclosing-ball-slimness of an r-separated convex polygon is at most $O(1/r)$.

A convex polygon is called k,r-separated if:

1. It does not have parallel edges, except maybe two horizontal and two vertical.
2. Each non-axis-parallel edge makes an angle of at least r with any other edge, and with the x and y axes.
3. If there are two horizontal edges, then diameter/height is at most k.
4. If there are two vertical edges, then diameter/width is at most k.

Lemma: The enclosing-ball-slimness of a k,r-separated convex polygon is at most $O(\max(k,1/r))$. improve the upper bound to $O(d)$.

== Counting fat objects ==
If an object o has diameter 2a, then every ball enclosing o must have radius at least a and volume at least $V_d a^.$ Hence, by definition of enclosing-ball-fatness, the volume of an R-fat object with diameter 2a must be at least $\tfrac{V_d a^d}{R^d}.$ Hence:

Lemma 1: Let R ≥ 1 and C ≥ 0 be two constants. Consider a collection of non-overlapping d-dimensional objects that are all globally R-fat (i.e. with enclosing-ball-slimness ≤ R). The number of such objects of diameter at least 2a, contained in a ball of radius C⋅a, is at most:

$$V_d \cdot \frac{(C a)^d }{V_d \cdot \frac{a^d}{R^d}} = (R C)^d$$

For example (taking d = 2, R = 1 and C = 3): The number of non-overlapping disks with radius at least 1 contained in a circle of radius 3 is at most 3^{2} = 9. (Actually, it is at most 7).

If we consider local-fatness instead of global-fatness, we can get a stronger lemma:

Lemma 2: Let R ≥ 1 and C ≥ 0 be two constants. Consider a collection of non-overlapping d-dimensional objects that are all locally R-fat (i.e. with local-enclosing-ball-slimness ≤ R). Let o be a single object in that collection with diameter 2a. Then the number of objects in the collection with diameter larger than 2a that lie within distance 2C⋅a from object o is at most:

$$(4 R \cdot (C+1))^d$$

For example (taking d = 2, R = 1 and C = 0): the number of non-overlapping disks with radius larger than 1 that touch a given unit disk is at most 4^{2} = 16 (this is not a tight bound since in this case it is easy to prove an upper bound of 5).

== Generalizations ==
The following generalization of fatness were studied by for 2-dimensional objects.

A triangle ∆ is a (β, δ)-triangle of a planar object o (0 < β ≤ π/3, 0 < δ < 1), if ∆ ⊆ o, each of the angles of ∆ is at least β, and the length of each of its edges is at least δ·diameter(o). An object o in the plane is (β, δ)-covered if for each point P ∈ o there exists a (β, δ)-triangle ∆ of o that contains P.

For convex objects, the two definitions are equivalent, in the sense that if o is α-fat, for some constant α, then it is also (β, δ)-covered, for appropriate constants β and δ, and vice versa. However, for non-convex objects the definition of being fat is more general than the definition of being (β, δ)-covered.

== Applications ==
Fat objects are used in various problems, for example:

- Motion planning - planning a path for a robot moving amidst obstacles becomes easier when the obstacles are fat objects.
- Fair cake-cutting - dividing a cake becomes more difficult when the pieces have to be fat objects. This requirement is common, for example, when the "cake" to be divided is a land-estate.
- More applications can be found in the references below.
