= Segment =

Segment, segmentation, segmented, or segmental may refer to:

== Biology ==
- Segmentation (biology), the division of body plans into a series of repetitive segments
  - Segmentation in the human nervous system
- Internodal segment, the portion of a nerve fiber between two Nodes of Ranvier
- Segment, in fruit anatomy, a section of a citrus fruit
- Parts of a genome, especially in virology

== Computing and communications ==
- Segment (radio and television), a narrative sub-unit of an episode, bounded by interstitials, such as commercials, continuity announcements, or other segments not direct continuations of the prior segment
- Memory segmentation, the division of computer memory into segments
  - Segment descriptor
  - Data segment
  - Code segment
- Image segmentation, the process of partitioning a digital image into multiple segments
- Time-series segmentation, the process of partitioning a time-series into a sequence of discrete segments in order to reveal the underlying properties of its source
- Network segmentation, splitting a computer network into subnetworks
  - Network segment
- Packet segmentation, the process of dividing a data packet into smaller units
  - Segmentation and reassembly
- TCP segmentation, the process of dividing a data stream into segments for transmission
- Segment architecture, a detailed, formal description of areas within an enterprise

== Geometry ==
- Line segment, part of a line bounded by two end points
- Circular segment, the region of a circle cut off from the rest by a secant or chord
- Spherical segment, the solid defined by cutting a sphere with a pair of parallel planes
- Arc (geometry), a closed segment of a differentiable curve

== Linguistics ==
- Segment (handwriting), the pen-tip trajectory between two defined points
- Segment (linguistics), a discrete unit of speech
  - Speech segmentation, identifying the boundaries between words in spoken languages
- Text segmentation, dividing written text into meaningful units

== Other uses ==
- Segmentary lineage, a model in social anthropology
- Market segmentation, dividing a broad market into sub-groups of consumers
- Euro Car Segment, EU descriptions of car types
- A-segment, first category in the passenger car classification system defined by the European Commission.

== See also ==
- Part (disambiguation)
- Division (disambiguation)
- Section (disambiguation)
- Subdivision (disambiguation)
- Annelid, a segmented worm
