= Partition =

Partition may refer to:

== Arts and entertainment ==
=== Film and television ===
- Partition (1987 film), directed by Ken McMullen
- Partition (2007 film), directed by Vic Sarin
- Partition: 1947, or Viceroy's House, a 2017 film

=== Music ===
- Partition (music), a segment created from a set
- "Partition" (song), by Beyoncé, 2014
- Partition, soundtrack to the 2007 film by Brian Tyler

== Law and politics ==
- Partition (law), the division of an estate
- Partition (politics), a change of political borders, including:
  - Partition of India
  - Partition of Ireland
  - Partitions of Poland

== Science and technology ==
=== Computing ===
- Disk partitioning, the division of a hard disk drive
- Memory partition, a memory management technique
- Partition (database), the division of a logical database
- Logical partition, a subset of a computer's resources, virtualized as a separate computer
- Binary space partitioning, in computer science
- Partition problem, in number theory and computer science

=== Mathematics ===
- Integer partition, a way to write an integer as a sum of other integers
- Multiplicative partition, a way to write an integer as a product of other integers
- Partition of an interval, a finite sequence of real numbers
- Partition of a set, grouping elements of a set
- Partition of unity, of a topological space
- Plane partition, in mathematics and especially combinatorics
- Graph partition, the reduction of a graph to a smaller graph

== Other uses ==
- Folding screen, a piece of furniture
- Portable partition, a form of temporary walls
- Ljubljanica Sluice Gate, or the Partition (Pregrada)
- Division of the field, or partition of the field, in heraldry

== See also ==
- Compartment (disambiguation)
- Divider (disambiguation)
- Part (disambiguation)
- Partition function (disambiguation)
- Section (disambiguation)
- Stanchion
- Bulkhead (partition), an upright wall in a ship, an airplane or a boxcar
- Cubicle, a partially enclosed office workspace
- Partition coefficient, in the physical sciences
- Partition wall, used to separate or divide a room
