= 2026 Iran war fuel crisis =

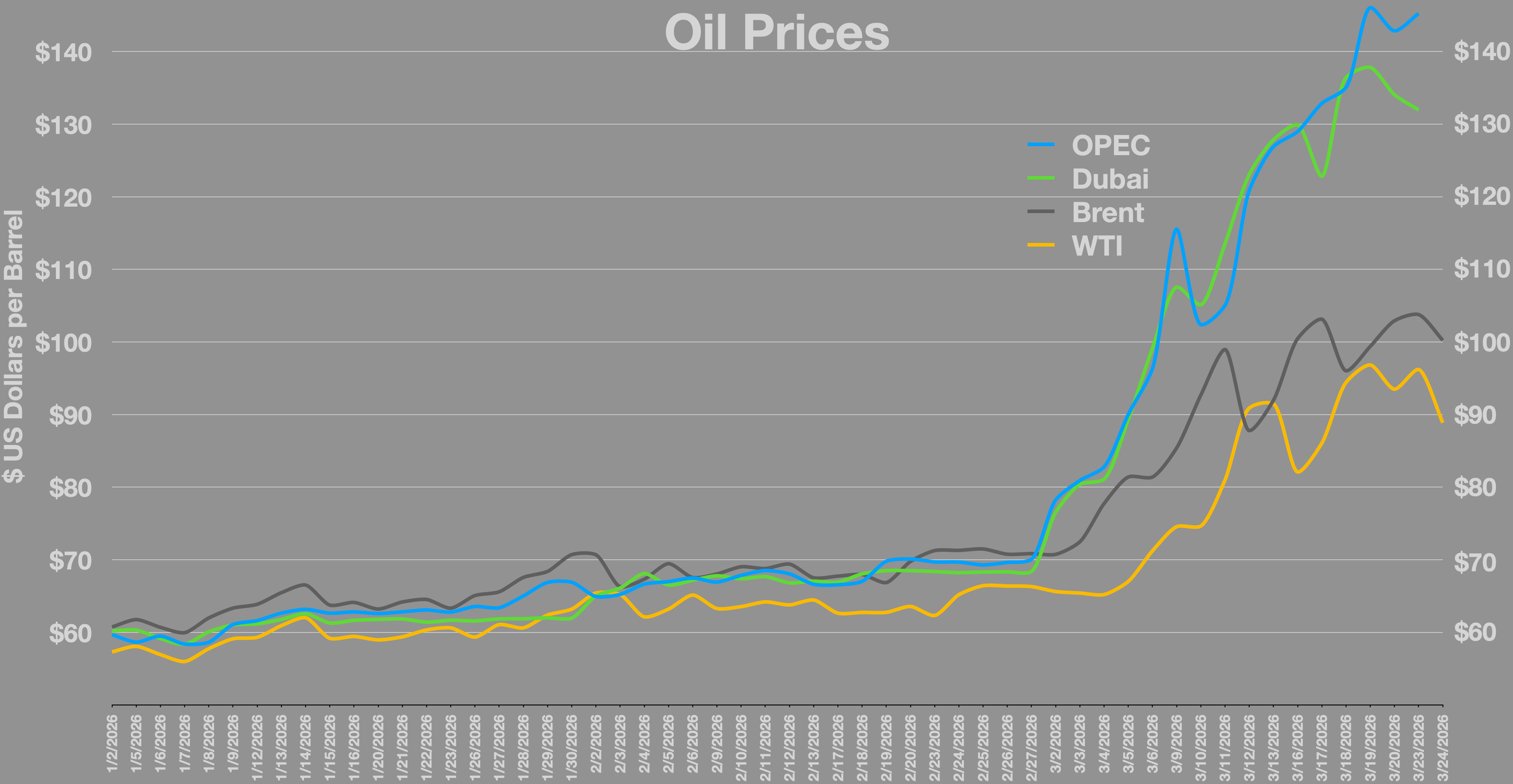
Oil prices OPEC Reference Basket Dubai Crude Brent Crude West Texas Intermediate

Diesel and gasoline prices in the United States

The 2026 Iran war fuel crisis is a worldwide fuel crisis caused by the war between Iran and the U.S.-Israel coalition. The closure of the Strait of Hormuz, through which over 20% of the world's oil trade passes, and attacks on energy infrastructure in Iran and several Gulf Cooperation Council countries led to a large disruption in global oil supplies. The disruption led to global oil prices rising and caused fuel shortages in countries which imported most of their fuel from the Persian Gulf region. Much of the world has been affected by panic buying and severe disruption to the distribution of petroleum products, liquefied natural gas (LNG), and urea used for fertiliser.

The economies of most countries are expected to be adversely affected by the crisis, leading to inflation and heightened risks of stagflation and recession. As of April 2026 there were ongoing concerns about energy security as well as food security, related to fertiliser shortages and costs.

Brent prices initially surged to a peak of approximately $118 in late March 2026 before declining to around $70 by July 1, then rebounded to over $100 by late July and fluctuated between $87 and $97 through August. As of early September 2026, price surged up to $109 as renewed attacks on shipping and energy infrastructure reversed earlier gains.

By June 2026, the yearly inflation rate is 3.53%, with the consumer price index decreasing by 0.42% and weekly earnings increasing by 0.77% since May 2026. In July, the IMF revised its world GDP growth rate to 3% for 2026 and 3.4% in 2027. According to the same report, the effects of the oil supply shock on the world economy are unevenly distributed, weighing more on energy importers and vulnerable economies.

== Overview ==
Viewed in context, the price of oil has been affected internationally at the times of the COVID-19 pandemic, the 2022 Russo-Ukrainian war and the 2026 Iran war.

The 2026 Iran war caused immediate volatility in energy markets, with Brent crude oil prices surging 7.6% to around $78 per barrel by 2 March 2026, and dropping back to near $70 by July, 2026. The conflict has caused the restriction of nearly all traffic through the Strait of Hormuz, leading to what the International Energy Agency has characterised as the "largest supply disruption in the history of the global oil market". The head of the IEA described the situation caused by the war as the "greatest global energy security challenge in history".

Iran's closure of the Strait of Hormuz disrupted 20% of global oil supplies and significant liquefied natural gas (LNG) volumes. Analysts have forecast that prices could reach $100 per barrel if disruptions persisted, potentially adding 0.8% to global inflation.

Even after Iran and the United States announced a ceasefire on 8 April, ship traffic through the Strait of Hormuz remained far below pre-war levels.

Exports from the region have been typically going to Asian countries, with China, India, Japan, and South Korea accounting for 75% of oil and 59% of LNG exports. However, Singapore and Taiwan depend more on Qatari LNG, while Pakistan and Bangladesh are more price sensitive.

Qatari state-owned oil and gas company QatarEnergy announced on 3 March that it was declaring Force Majeure on its contracts with buyers, and internal sources, according to Reuters, said that it would soon be shutting down gas liquefication, as LNG tankers could not leave the Gulf, and that restarting it would take weeks. These announcements caused increases in world gas prices, which analysts said was a part of the Iranian Government's plan to apply pressure on the world to stop the war. On 6 March, Qatar warned that if the war continues, other Gulf energy producers may be forced to halt exports and declare Force Majeure. Also on 6 March, it was reported that according to satellite imagery analysis by both Bloomberg and the Energy Economics and Society Research Institute in Tokyo, that Ras Laffan, the main gas facility in Qatar, appears not to have been damaged before the "unprecedented shutdown" which sent fuel prices higher. The United States, buffered by domestic production, faced less direct impact but saw petrol prices rise 5–10 cents per gallon daily.

On 18 March, Iran hit Qatar's inactive Ras Laffan Industrial City LNG complex, causing a 17% reduction in Qatar's LNG production capacity. The damages from this attack would take 3–5 years to fix. Consequently, LNG spot prices in Asia increased by over 140 %.

The impacts of the conflict are similar to the 1970s energy crisis, including acute supply shortages, currency volatility, inflation, and heightened risks of stagflation and recession.

According to the International Energy Agency's World Energy Investment 2026 report, the crisis was prompting a reshaping of global energy investment and accelerating diversification away from Middle Eastern supply routes. The agency projected total energy investment of $3.4 trillion in 2026, with oil investment falling for a third consecutive year to below $500 billion, while natural gas investment rose to $330 billion—its highest in a decade—driven by new LNG projects in the United States and Qatar. Coal investment was projected to reach $180 billion, the highest since 2012. IEA Executive Director Fatih Birol described the situation as "the largest energy security crisis the world has ever faced", drawing a parallel with the oil shocks of the 1970s.

Countries such as Australia and India have more sufficient reserves but face challenges with panic buying. Economies most reliant on the strait for energy imports are in Asia, with Europe also viewing the strait as vital for its energy security. The initial disruption of petroleum is expected to affect Asia the most, but Europe is likely to be hit hard in the medium-to-long term, and the UK is expected to be the worst-hit major economy.

The British think tank The Food Policy Institute has warned of long-term increases in food prices due to disruption in fuel and fertiliser markets. The Strait of Hormuz is central to the global fertiliser trade. Over 30 per cent of global urea, which is widely used and produced from natural gas – is exported from Gulf countries through the Strait. Much of the cost of producing some foods, including corn and wheat, is in the cost of fertiliser, and this cost, along with rising energy costs, makes basic food production very expensive. Much of the Gulf states' food is imported – for example, over 90 per cent in Qatar. These factors have led to fears of food insecurity not only in Gulf states, but around the world.

As of 28 March, analysts fear that another hard oil crisis is unfolding that is expected to be very decisive to the global economy.

In August 2026, it was reported that, due to declining Chinese imports and increased oil production outside the Persian Gulf, Brent crude was trading at $90 per barrel—about one-quarter higher than pre-war levels.

Oil prices increased on September 13 due to market stability after recent declines. Investors are awaiting potential U.S.-Iran talks at the UN General Assembly. Analysts believe the price rise may result from traders adjusting their positions rather than a change in market trends.

Diesel prices in Europe and the United States reached record or near-record levels in September 2026, as supply disruptions linked to the wars in Iran and Ukraine reduced exports from major producers. European diesel futures had more than doubled since the beginning of the year. Middle Eastern diesel exports fell by half between March and August compared with the same period in 2025, averaging 800,000 barrels per day. The region had supplied nearly 41% of Europe's diesel imports in 2025. In Asia, the benchmark diesel price stood at around $180 per barrel on 18 September, approximately twice its pre-war level. An analysis by the Centre for Research on Energy and Clean Air found that diesel and gasoil benchmark prices averaged 59% above pre-war market expectations during the first six months of the conflict. The analysis estimated that fossil-fuel importers incurred an additional $73.8 billion in costs for diesel and gasoil over the six-month period, compared with what pre-war futures markets had forecast.

In October 2026, the residential cruise ship MV Odyssey, operated by Florida-based Villa Vie Residences, suspended its world voyage while docked in Sihanoukville, Cambodia. The company attributed the decision to a sharp rise in fuel prices, reporting that monthly fuel costs per cabin, which had previously averaged about $1,800, had increased to an estimated $6,000–$8,000 in some parts of Asia amid the 2026 Iran war. The suspension left approximately 200 passengers needing to disembark while the company considered arrangements for the ship's onward journey.

On November 3, oil prices fell following an announcement by U.S. President Donald Trump that the United States would no longer provide billions of dollars in annual military support to Israel.

Following the war in Iran, the surge in oil and gas prices has prompted people to look for alternatives to fossil fuels, causing a slight reduction in carbon emissions this year. Scientists forecast that carbon dioxide emissions from oil, gas, and coal will level off by 2026. In particular, emissions from oil are anticipated to decrease by 2% as electric vehicle usage grows. However, experts warn that this decline might be short-lived, as emissions from deforestation and land use are rising due to major fires in Southeast Asia. Approximately 38.2 billion tonnes of CO2 are expected to be released this year.

=== Airlines ===
Airlines are being affected by the shortage of jet fuel in parts of Asia and Oceania. Many airlines in southeast Asia and Oceania are either adding surcharges to fares or cancelling flights or routes. Australia, which sources most of its jet fuel from China, followed by Singapore and South Korea, has 30 days' worth of jet fuel held in reserve.

South Korea makes the refined product and exports it around the region, but it relies mostly on crude arriving via the Gulf. The country therefore capped its jet fuel exports at the previous year's level. Korean Air is the country's third airline to enter "emergency mode", at this point focusing only on internal cost-reduction measures.

== Africa ==
=== Algeria ===
Algeria is an oil and natural gas producer, and one of the European Union's largest suppliers of LNG. It has entered talks with Spain and Italy, as well as fielding enquiries from other countries, including Vietnam. It could benefit economically.

=== Egypt ===
Egypt relies on imported oil, so the government has introduced measures to keep fuel usage down, including the mandatory closure of retail businesses at 9pm for a month, dimming street lights and roadside advertisements. It has slowed down some large government projects, and increased the price of both petrol and public transport fares. Non-essential workers have been ordered to work from home one day per week.

=== Ethiopia ===
Ethiopia is experiencing a severe fuel crisis, with over 180,000 tonnes of fuel undelivered in recent weeks. This has halved the country's daily diesel supply from 9.2 million to 4.5 million litres, according to Minister Kassahun Gofe. In Ethiopia, security institutions have been prioritised, along with, major government projects, key industries, and essential goods production. There are fuel restrictions, and petrol stations are prioritising public transport. Fuel supplies to the Tigray Region have been completely suspended. An Addis Ababa resident reported, “Over the past month, prices of many commodities have increased significantly ...bottled water, cooking oil, eggs and other essentials have risen by nearly 40 per cent.”

=== Ghana ===
Ghana, which has limited refining capacity, relies on imported refined products, but is supplied by a range of producers, including Russia.

=== Kenya ===
Kenya is badly affected by the war, as it sources all its oil from the Middle East. There has been panic buying of petrol, but the Energy and Petroleum Regulatory Authority (EPRA) has maintained stability in prices for 30 days. The war has also affected some exports, with ships taking longer to reach their destination, so the Kenya Ports Authority has prioritised the export of perishable products such as tea, flowers, and avocados. The fuel crisis has greatly impacted Kenya's important floriculture industry.

The EPRA announced record high fuel price increases on 15 April. This resulted in public transport operators hiking their fares by roughly 25% dependent on various factors. These actions are expected to raise inflation and increase prices for basic goods and important services.

=== Mauritius ===
Mauritius is dependent on oil imports for generating power, and, after a shipment of oil had not arrived as scheduled on 30 March, only 21 days of stock remained in the country. The government arranged for more expensive alternative fuel to be shipped from Singapore, and imposed restrictions to reduce electricity consumption.

=== Namibia ===
The Namibian Government reduced fuel levies by 50% for at least three months, using its National Energy Fund to stabilise prices until the end of June. Gas and oil exploration continues in the country, which expects to start producing oil by 2030.

=== Nigeria ===
Nigeria is a major oil producer, and its large Dangote refinery has increased production to help meet world shortages. Despite the government and oil companies profiting from this, ordinary citizens are not expected to benefit immediately, due to transport cost increases.

=== South Africa ===
Saudi Arabia supplies most of South Africa's fuel. The South African Government has said that there was no shortage of fuel in the country, but prices have increased and some petrol stations have introduced their own rationing of diesel. With more traffic potentially taking the route around the Cape of Good Hope, and ships needing to fuel along the African coast, some ports such as Walvis Bay, Cape Town, and Durban may come under increased pressure, but also benefit from the diversion.

=== Uganda ===
At the end of March, Uganda only had a few weeks' worth of stock.

=== South Sudan ===
South Sudan has large oil reserves, but most of it is exported and it relies on imports for refined products. Because the country generates 96% of its electricity from oil, the government has started rationing electricity in the capital, Juba, which affects businesses, and rolling power cuts are expected to continue.

=== Zimbabwe ===
Zimbabwe has announced plans to scrap some taxes on fuel imports, which rose 40% in under a month. It has increased the amount of ethanol in its petrol from 5% to 20%.

== Americas ==
=== North America ===
The retail price of gasoline in the US increased at the outbreak of war in Iran. In late April 2026, Trump said Americans should expect higher gas prices for "a little while".

The retail price of diesel fuel in the US increased at the outbreak of war in Iran.

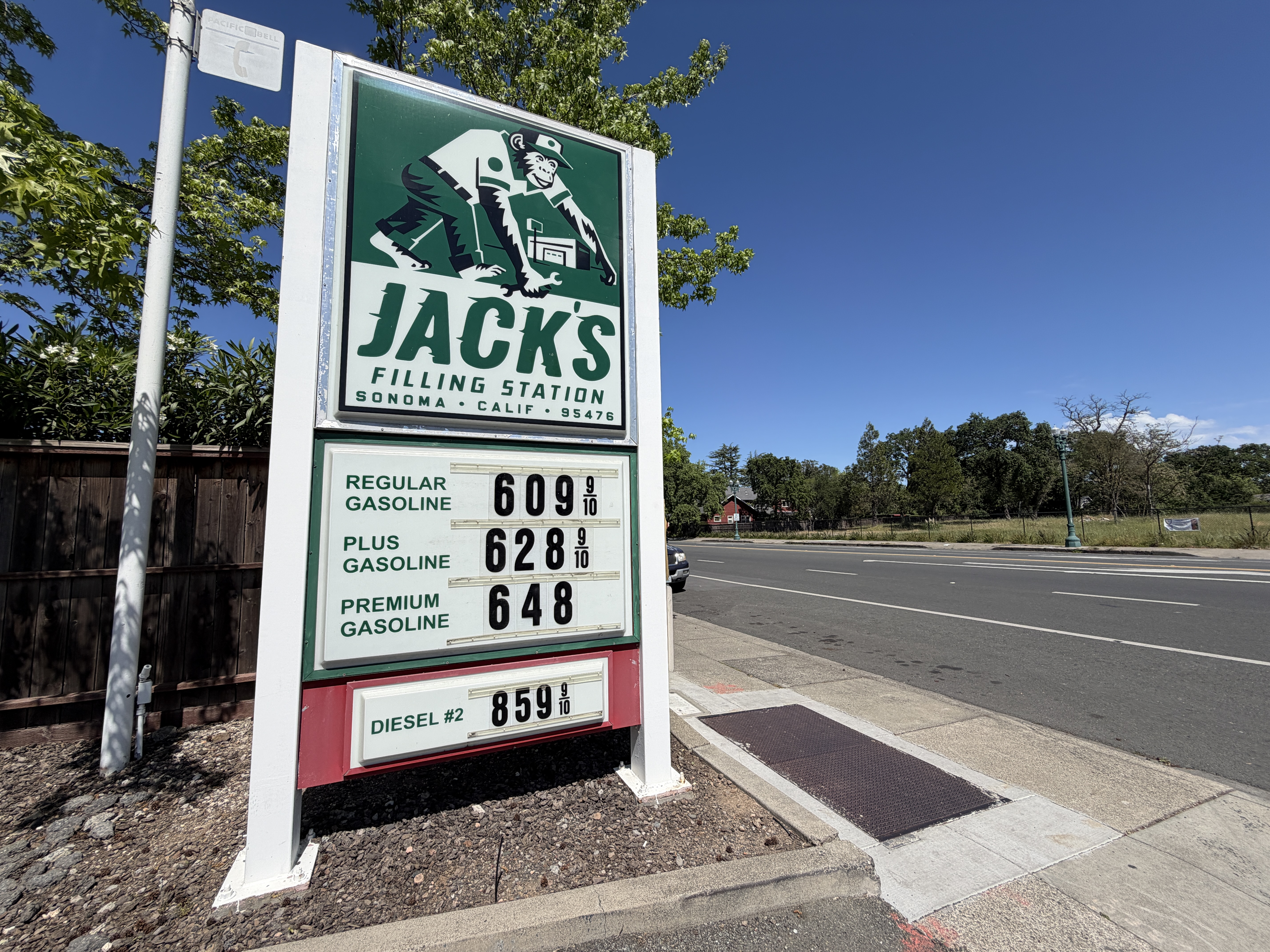
Gas prices in Sonoma, California on 7 April 2026

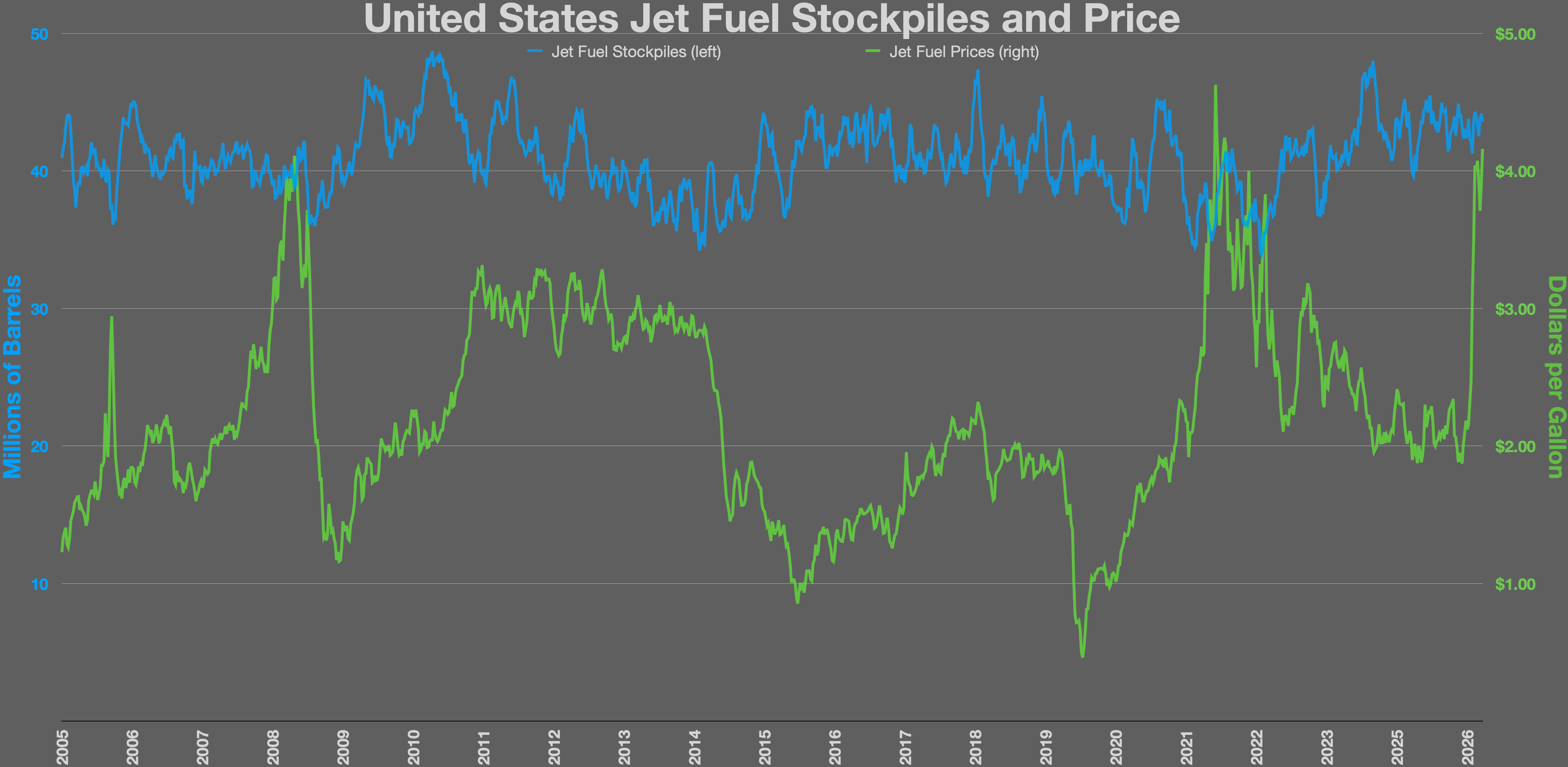
United States jet fuel stockpiles and price

Fuel prices across North America have gone up significantly, beginning in early March, due to the market conditions shifting rapidly as the crisis continues. Liquefied natural gas prices have largely remained the same since the beginning of the energy crisis due to the lack of connectivity in the North American liquefied natural gas market, with minimal pipelines and export points. Gas prices have risen $1.16 a gallon in the United States since the start of the war, with prices expected to hit $5.00 a gallon if the Strait of Hormuz is not opened by mid-April. In California, a state heavily reliant on energy imports from Asia, gasoline prices surpassed $6 a gallon in seven counties as of March 30. In Canada, gas prices have risen approximately 30 percent from March to April. Jet fuel in the United States spiked 95 percent since the war began, causing multiple airlines to raise prices for checked baggage. Shipping services, such as the United States Postal Service, Amazon, and FedEx implemented fuel surcharges.

On 24 April, U.S. exports of crude and petroleum products rose to nearly 12.9 million barrels a day.

On 2 May 2026, Spirit Airlines ceased all operations citing rising fuel costs despite the Trump administration's attempts to save the company.

In the United States, rising diesel prices placed particular pressure on smaller trucking companies operating in the spot market, which had less ability to pass higher fuel costs on to customers. Industry analysts warned that sustained increases could lead to higher freight charges and consumer prices, while eventually weakening demand for goods transportation.

In September 2026, Costco began rationing motor oil to two boxes per customer per week. The Strategic Petroleum Reserve fell to its lowest levels since November 1982 as 172 million barrels were planned to be drawn down.

According to the AAA, average diesel prices in the United States reached $6.53 on 22 September, up 77% from a year ago.

In its September 2026 report, the International Energy Agency noted that U.S. diesel and gasoil prices rose above $200 per barrel in early September, marking a 94% increase over pre-war levels.

U.S. distillate fuel oil inventories, which include diesel fuel and heating oil, fell by 3.6 million barrels to approximately 99.3 million barrels in the week ending 30 October 2026. This was their lowest level since May 2003 and about 13% below the five-year average for that time of year. Inventories subsequently increased by 4.1 million barrels to 103.3 million barrels in the week ending 6 November 2026.

On 9 October 2026, Donald Trump announced a deal with Vladimir Putin for Russia to release 300,000 tonnes of diesel immediately "to the American and global marketplace", followed by 500,000 tonnes in November and another million tonnes after that. Ukraine's President Volodymyr Zelenskyy condemned the deal, calling it a gift to Putin that amounted to "an investment in a war that must be ended, not prolonged".

== Asia ==
Asian countries are the primary destination for crude oil from the Gulf, with most of it travelling via the Strait of Hormuz. In 2024, around 84 per cent of the crude oil and 83 per cent of LNG passing through the Strait went to Asia; nearly 70 per cent of the oil went to China, India, Japan, and South Korea. Governments and businesses across the region have been imposing measures to reduce the impact of the fuel crisis, and among the worst hit countries in the region include Pakistan, Bangladesh, and Vietnam.

=== Bangladesh ===
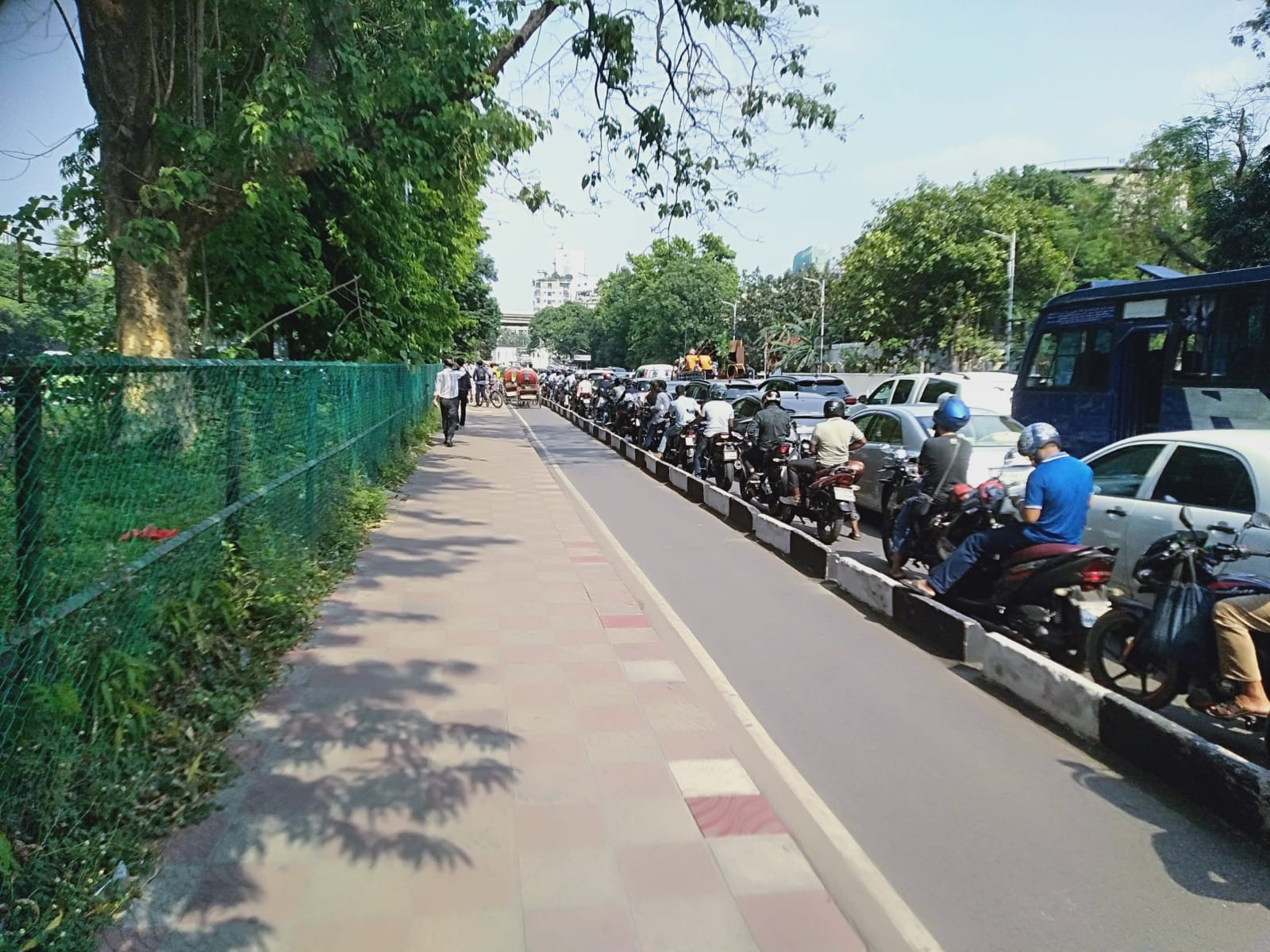
A long queue of vehicles waiting for refueling in Dhaka, Bangladesh

Bangladesh is among the worst hit economies and is projected to have a severe impact on GDP growth inducing recession-like conditions. There have been fears of unrest due to the fuel crisis.

Universities were closed in advance for the upcoming Eid al-Fitr holidays in order to conserve electricity and fuel. All shopping centres and commercial establishments have also been directed to shut down by 8.00 pm. This was later revised to 6 pm, before being increased to 7 pm and extended the restrictions to cultural events.

Bangladesh relies on coal for much of its power, and has ramped up power generation from coal as well as importing more power created from coal.

=== China ===
As of March 2025, the government is estimated to have 401 million barrels stored in above-ground facilities and 668 million barrels in above-ground commercial storage. By December 2025, United States Energy Information Administration estimated China held around 1.4 billion barrels of crude oil in reserve from both government-held and commercial inventories, which are both part of the strategic reserves. Outside of the official strategic reserves, Chinese corporate and commercial refineries also have several hundred million barrels of crude oil. China hiked prices several times during the war, but due to queue forming in the gas stations in multiple Chinese cities, the Chinese government reduced its planned fuel price hikes.

China's large strategic reserve helped the country insulate itself significantly from the 2026 Iran war and ensuing global fuel crisis.

By late June 2026, China's strategic petroleum reserve (SPR) remained nearly unchanged after the Iran war. To ensure domestic supplies without using strategic reserve, China halted its supplies of refined oil products to other countries.

China is a major oil refiner and exporter of petroleum products. On 5 March, major Chinese refiners, including China Petroleum & Chemical (Sinopec) and Rongsheng Petrochemical Co Ltd, were ordered by the government to stop accepting new fuel export contracts. Jet fuel refuelling for international flights and supplies to Hong Kong and Macau are exempt from this guidance.

During the crisis, China primarily tapped into its corporate stockpiles, outside its official SPR of 1.23 billion barrels, to supply domestic needs. There could also be other previously unreported reserves in China. These corporate reserves can be used at one million barrels per day for a year. China's growing renewable energy sector and electric vehicle industry have also reduced the demand for petroleum products.

Although China restricted overall exports of refined oil products during the war, it still supplied limited volumes to selected partner countries, either due to friendly relations or to secure diplomatic leverage. The conflict has also provided China with an opportunity to expand its renewable energy technologies in Asia.

=== India ===
LPG cylinder shortage leading to long queues in Mehsana, Gujarat on 14 March 2026

People standing in a long queue to obtain gas cylinders in Sikkim, India, on 3 April 2026.

As of 13 October 2026, cost pressures on India's fuel market were intensifying. Brent crude returned above $100 in September, and speaking in Mumbai on 24 September, Chief Economic Adviser V. Anantha Nageswaran said that a second phase of the energy shock was beginning and that the burden might again have to be shared between the government, oil companies and consumers if prices stayed high into October and November. State-run retail prices of petrol and diesel, raised in May, were unchanged in September and early October, and the rating agency ICRA estimated that the three state-run oil marketing companies (OMCs) were losing about ₹530 crore a day in September. On 11 October the tanker MT Petro Dolphin was struck by a drone in the Strait of Hormuz region, and two of the 11 Indian seafarers on board were reported missing; India's Ministry of External Affairs condemned the attack and called for de-escalation.

India imports about 90 per cent of its crude oil and around half of its natural gas. Before the war, about 45 per cent of its crude imports, half of its LNG imports and 90 per cent of its LPG imports passed through the Strait of Hormuz. In late March, long queues formed at petrol stations in several cities as people bought fuel in panic, although the Petroleum Ministry and the state-run oil companies said there was no shortage of petrol or diesel. In August, Petroleum Minister Hardeep Singh Puri said that India had avoided fuel shortages through diversified sourcing, expanded refining capacity and higher domestic production, and that the United States had become India's largest LPG supplier.

Indian refiners began buying prompt Russian crude cargoes in March as the war disrupted Middle Eastern supplies. According to Kpler data, Russian crude imports fell from 2.66 million barrels per day in July to about 1.74 million in September, the lowest since April, while crude from the Gulf recovered to 2.7–3 million barrels per day, broadly the pre-conflict level, as flows through the Strait improved. Russia nevertheless remained India's largest crude supplier in September. The recovery was fragile: Iranian attacks on ships using a US-assisted export route out of the Gulf increased in October, with at least 15 vessels reported targeted by 12 October. India is the fourth-largest country in the world by oil refining capacity.

The government initially shielded consumers from the price shock. On 27 March it cut the central excise duty on petrol and diesel for domestic consumption by ₹10 (11¢ US) per litre and imposed export duties of ₹21.5 (23¢ US) per litre on diesel and ₹29.5 (32¢ US) per litre on aviation fuel to ensure domestic availability. The export levies have since been revised several times; from 1 October the rate on diesel was ₹16 per litre. On 15 May, state-run retailers raised petrol and diesel prices by ₹3 per litre, the first increase in nearly four years; further rises took the cumulative increase in May to ₹7.35 per litre for petrol and ₹7.53 for diesel. as of 8 October 2026, petrol sold for ₹102.12 and diesel for ₹95.20 per litre in Delhi. ICRA estimated that if Brent averaged $105–115 in the second half of the financial year and pump prices stayed unchanged, OMC under-recoveries could reach about ₹64,000 crore in 2026–27. Airlines have passed on higher costs: on 5 October IndiGo announced higher fuel surcharges on domestic and international flights from 6 October, citing a rise of more than 14 per cent in aviation fuel prices over the previous month.

Liquefied petroleum gas (LPG) is the main cooking fuel for households and restaurants in India. About 60 per cent of India's LPG is imported, and about 90 per cent of those shipments normally pass through the Hormuz Strait. Analysts identified LPG as India's most immediate vulnerability; restaurants cut menus and, in Mumbai, up to a fifth of hotels and restaurants were reported to be fully or partly shut in March. The government prioritised household supply and introduced a 25-day minimum booking interval, raised the price of domestic LPG by ₹60 per cylinder, and set a 45-day booking interval in rural areas. The government allowed restaurants and hotels to switch temporarily to biomass, kerosene and coal, made extra kerosene available, and the BBC reported a rise in firewood sales in parts of the country. India turned to alternative suppliers, including the United States under a one-year deal for 2.2 million tonnes in 2026, and pushed households towards piped gas: in March it added 580,000 new piped gas connections, compared with 342,300 a year earlier. In September, state refiners raised domestic LPG output by nearly 20 per cent from the August average, to about 44,000 tonnes a day, as festive-season demand rose and imports from the Middle East remained constrained.

Higher energy costs have fed into inflation and monetary policy. Consumer price inflation rose to 5.54 per cent in September 2026 from 4.83 per cent in August, with food inflation at 7.74 per cent. On 7 October the Reserve Bank of India raised its repo rate by 25 basis points to 5.50 per cent, its first increase since February 2023, and changed its stance to "calibrated tightening", judging that inflation and its outlook were no longer as benign as in the previous year amid sharp volatility in crude oil prices following the re-escalation of the West Asia conflict. In March, the government said India was ready for unprecedented coal power demand in the summer, with coal stocks sufficient for 88 days.

=== Indonesia ===
Indonesia, although an oil producer itself, imports around a third of its supply. As the largest economy in Southeast Asia, it keeps a fuel reserve of around 22 days.

The shortage in fuel imports have caused prices for unsubsidized fuel to increase by up to 32%, as well as a surge in spending for fuel, electricity, and fertilizers subsidies to double that of last year.

=== Japan ===
As of February 2026, 94.2% of Japan's crude oil imports came from the Middle East. However, the impacts of the oil supply disruption due to the strait closure were partly mitigated by its large stockpiles.

On 16 March, the Government of Japan started releasing 80 million barrels of oil, equivalent to 15 days of domestic demand, from its strategic reserves.

=== Myanmar ===
Myanmar, which has experienced civil war since 2021, has restricted private vehicle use to alternate days, and there are long queues at petrol stations. The country is lacking in refineries, and it relies on oil products imported from Thailand, Vietnam, and Singapore.

=== Nepal ===
The executive director of the state-run Nepal Oil Corporation announced that, as of March 13, authorities would refill only half of consumers' empty cylinders to lengthen liquid petroleum stockpiles.

=== Philippines ===
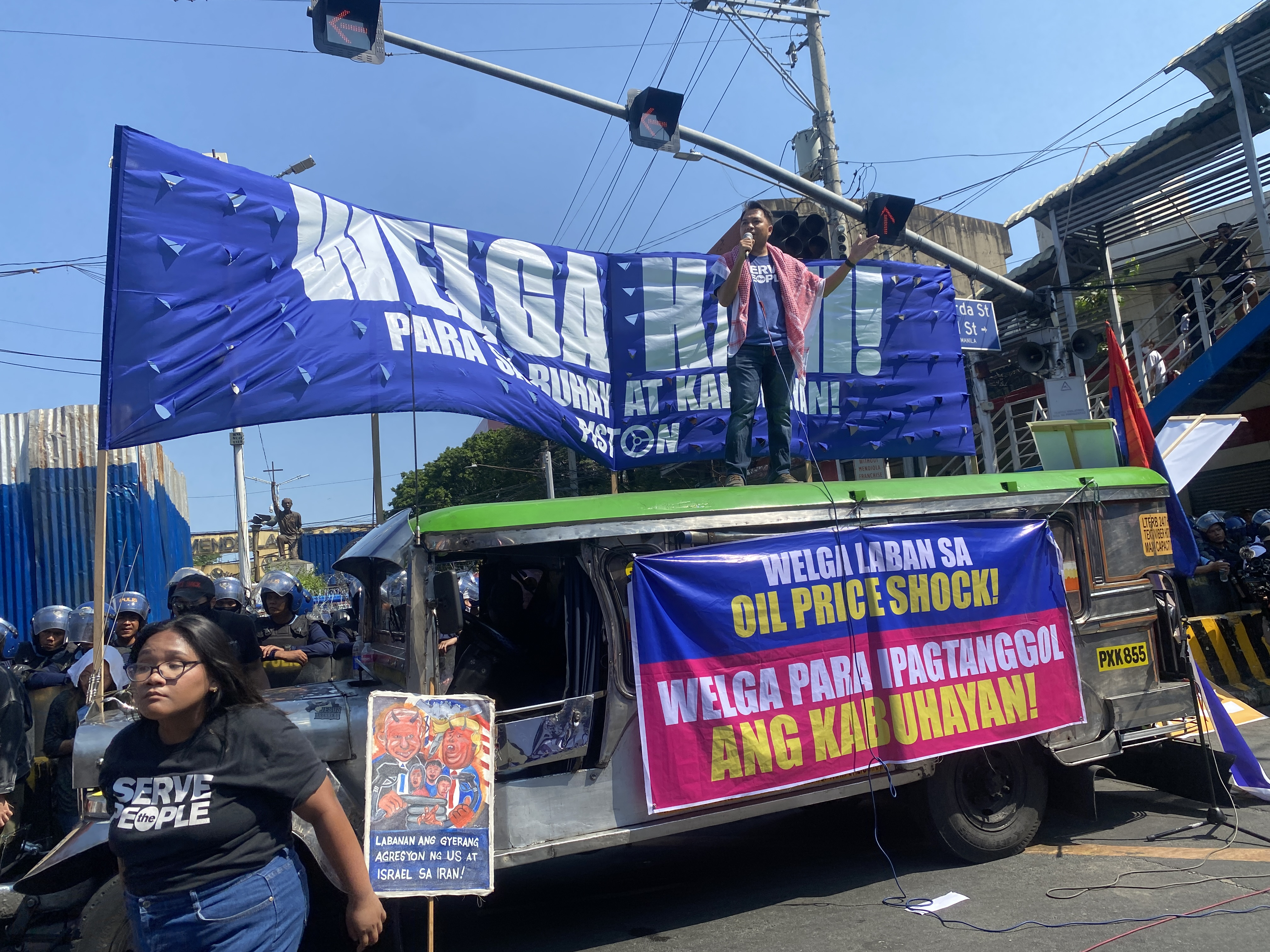

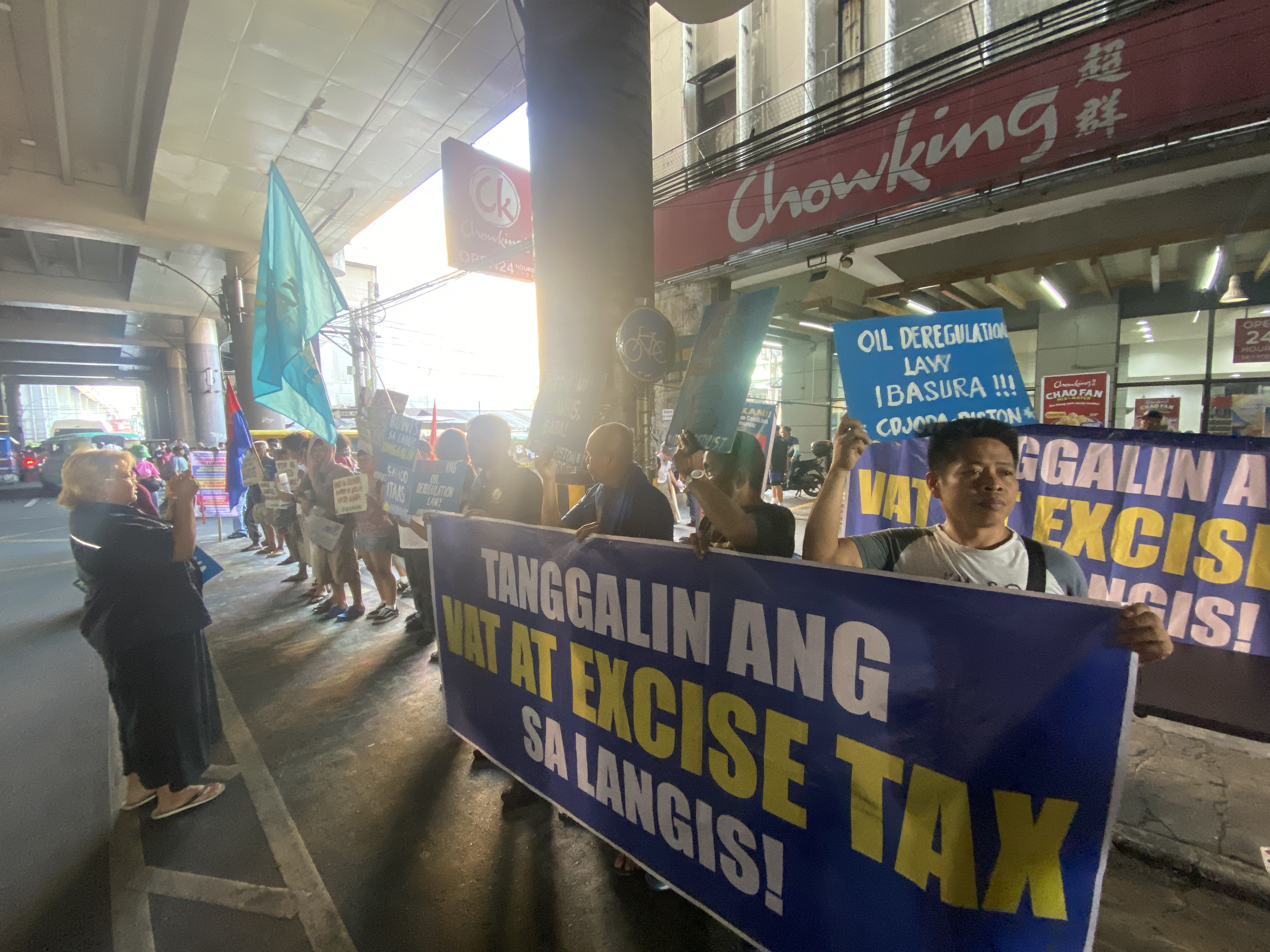
Transport groups protesting in Manila, demanding the removal of VAT and excises, and the repeal of the oil deregulation law

Since late February 2026, the closure of the Strait of Hormuz during the 2026 Iran war disrupted roughly 20 percent of the world's oil supply, triggering a global economic downturn and fuel shortages. The Philippines, which imports most of its oil from the Middle East, was particularly vulnerable to supply disruptions because of its heavy dependence on imported petroleum.

On March 23, Claire Castro, press officer of the Office of the President of the Philippines, said the country was experiencing a "price disruption" caused by the conflict in the Middle East but was not yet facing an oil crisis. Her remarks were echoed by Energy Secretary Sharon Garin. The same day, President Bongbong Marcos ordered the creation of a crisis committee to maintain economic stability and ensure the continued delivery of essential resources, including supplies for schools.

On March 24, Marcos declared a state of national energy emergency, stating that the country had sufficient crude oil supplies until June 30. The Philippines became the first country to declare an energy emergency in response to the war.

According to the Philippine Institute for Development Studies (PIDS), the energy crisis could push between 1.3 million and 3.1 million Filipinos into poverty.

The Philippines declared a state of emergency on 24 March due to a concurrent strike by transport workers, and government offices in the Philippines are working only four days per week.

=== Singapore ===
Singapore is an important hub for the passage of oil; it receives crude oil, mostly from the Middle East, and its refineries (most of which are on the 32-square-kilometre (12 sq mi) Jurong Island) produce the products which are then exported around the Asia-Pacific region, processing up to 1.5 million barrels of crude per day. Singapore and Australia made an agreement to keep their energy trade flowing, and Singapore economic officials have said that the country's refineries are maintaining stable operations and drawing on diverse supplies of crude oil.

=== South Korea ===
The crisis has not had a dramatic impact on the lives of most South Koreans, and energy minister Kim Sung-hwan has said that the country would not experience problems with supply for over a year. However, the Korean Government launched an energy-saving campaign, encouraging its citizens to have brief showers, and limit their use of washing machines, and it has postponed the decommissioning of coal-fired power plants as well as lifting the cap on electricity made from coal.

=== Sri Lanka ===
Sri Lanka has introduced a four-day working week. In addition, there are long queues for petrol, causing people to miss out on work.

=== Thailand ===
Thailand has been severely impacted by the crisis. Thailand imports 57% of its oil from the Middle East, which requires to pass the Strait of Hormuz. The diesel fuel price has increased from 29.94 THB per litre in February, up to peak price of 50.54 THB per litre in 7 April.

The government froze diesel prices at 29.94 THB per litre in the first 15 days of the crisis, and has directed people to raise their air-conditioning temperatures and reduce their outer clothing, to reduce energy consumption, and employees of all government agencies are working from home.

Phipat Ratchakitprakarn, Deputy Prime Minister of Thailand and co-owner of PTG Energy (branded as PT), one of the largest oil companies in Thailand, was assigned by Anutin Charnvirakul, Prime Minister of Thailand to control and mitigate the impact of fuel crisis in Thailand. He has been criticised by Thai citizens for his failure to manage the impact, and the "Ban PT" movement has gained traction across the internet.

In Pathum Thani Province, north of Bangkok, the local Provincial Administrative Organization (PAO) has terminated its 4.45 satang per litre (Equivalent to 0.445 THB) fuel dispenser tax for 3 months, in 317 stations across the province. Normally, this tax generates 4 million THB per month for the PAO. By this measure the PAO hopes to reduce fuel costs for the residents of Pathum Thani Province, especially for farmers.

On 3 April, Ruthaphon Naowarat, Minister of Justice, stated in CCSA Press Conference that the Ministry of Justice had detected 57 million litres of fuel missing from 217 million litres transported by sea to six oil depots in Surat Thani province, only 160 million litres arrived at destination. This has created controversies regarding government responsibilities.

On 4 April, Bangchak Corporation, the third largest oil company in Thailand with around 2200 petrol stations nationwide, announced the "Fry to Fly" Program, which offers customers to exchange 2 litres of used cooking oil for 1 litre of diesel fuel or petrol (up to 20 litres of cooking oil per person) at 15 stations across the Bangkok Metropolitan Region. This program reduces customers' fuel costs and allows Bangchak to use the used cooking oil to produce sustainable aviation fuel (SAF). The program will be in effect from 6 to 30 April.

On 8 April, the Energy Policy Administration Committee announced on the Royal Gazette of Thailand that diesel prices would be cut at the refinery level by 2 THB per litre, aiming to reduce fuel costs and cost of living for Thai citizens. This reduction includes Diesel B0, Diesel B7 and Diesel B20 blends, effective from 9 April. This resulted in diesel fuel prices dropping from 50.54 THB per litre on 7 April, to 48.40 THB per litre on 9 April. On 11 April prices dropped to 44.40 THB per litre for normal diesel and to 37.40 THB per litre for Diesel B20.

=== Vietnam ===
Vietnam is among the most fragile of South East Asian countries due to low energy security, relying on countries such as China and Thailand for petroleum imports. Vietnam is among the worst hit in South East Asia, with only Laos and Cambodia facing a worse situation.

The economic impact of the fuel crisis is expected to slow Vietnam's economic growth. The fuel crisis has had a widespread impact on Vietnamese society as people change habits and find new ways of production. Gig workers were especially hard hit by the rising fuel prices.

The government of Vietnam has abolished some fuel levies until mid-April, but fuel prices are still way above what they were before the war. Increased shipping costs for local businesses have hurt them economically, with customers dropping off.

== Europe ==
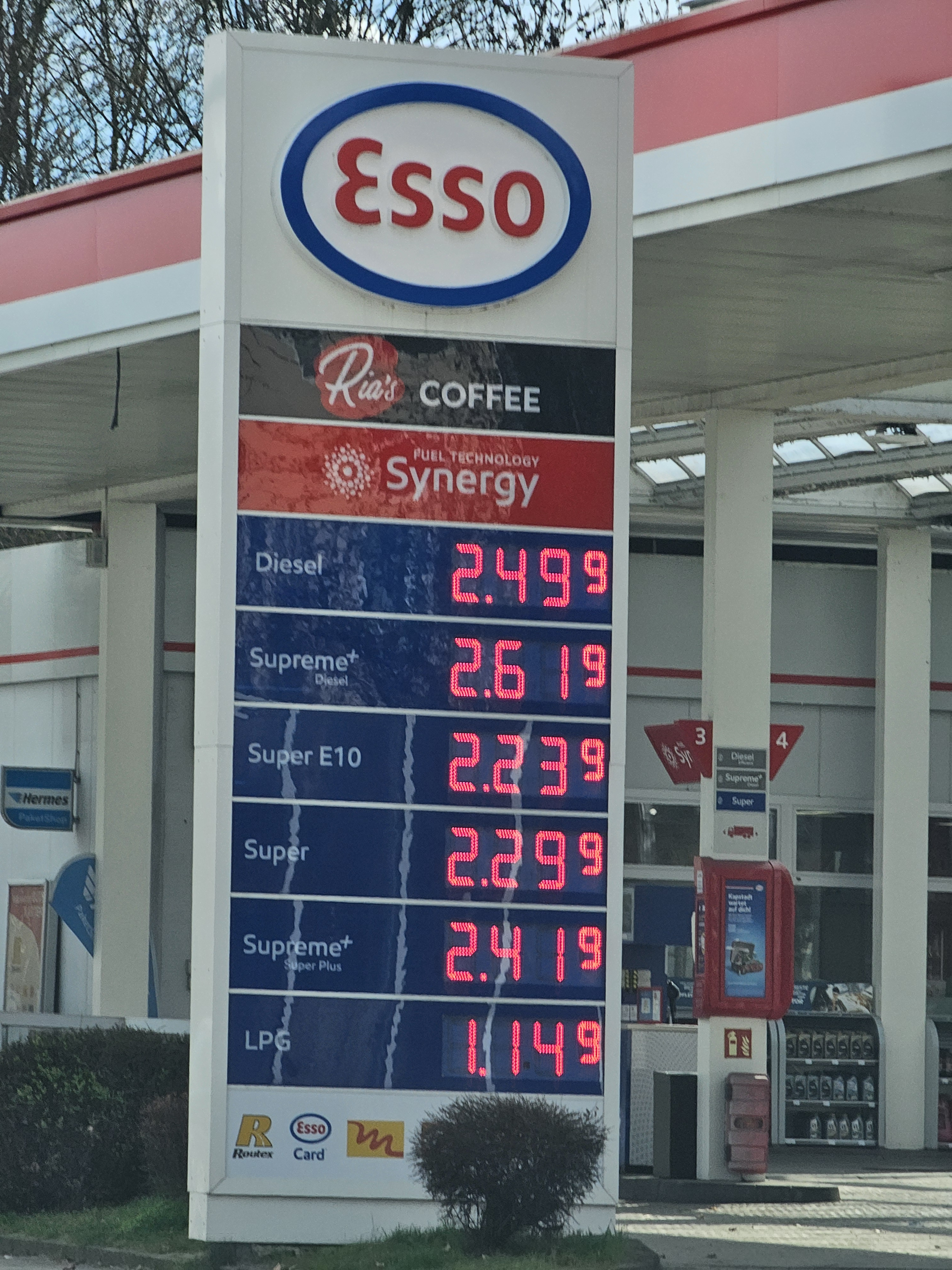
Gas prices in Hof, Bavaria, in Germany

Primarily through the suspension of Qatari liquefied natural gas (LNG) and the closure of the Strait of Hormuz, several publications including the BBC, PBS, Deutsche Welle, Euronews, Financial Times and Bruegel, along with banks and think tanks, have projected that the continent will enter an energy crisis in 2026 similar to the 2022 energy crisis that followed the War in Ukraine.

The conflict coincided with historically low European gas storage levels – estimated at just 30% capacity following a harsh 2025–2026 winter – causing Dutch TTF gas benchmarks to nearly double to over €60/MWh by mid-March. On 26 March, the European Commission advised its member states to fill their gas storages early to avoid price spikes later in the year.

"Just like the crisis after Russia's fullscale invasion of Ukraine. Different conflict. Same European divisions; same dilemmas over energy. We can't keep going round in these circles. Something's got to give."

— A quote of a European MEP by Katya Adler of the BBC. She writes that "You'd be hard-pushed to find a policy-maker in Europe who didn't agree with that last statement."

After the Qatari Ministry of Defence announced on 2 March that two Iranian drones attacked Qatari gas facilities, followed closely by an announcement from QatarEnergy that all gas production in the country had been halted, European natural gas prices nearly doubled. This raised concerns over energy security and fertiliser costs. EU natural gas prices decreased again to a less-high €48/MWh on Wednesday 4 March.

The Iran conflict also bolstered the necessity for renewable energy, as solar and wind power can reduce vulnerability to external supply and decentralised power generation that offers greater autonomy from global energy markets. With fluctuating oil prices, renewable energy has become significantly more cost-competitive. April 2026 was the strongest month of electric vehicle sales on record in Europe. Shell plc's CEO warned that Europe could face shortages of fuel by April. British supermarket chain Asda warned that it was already facing shortages of fuel at their fuel stations.

In addition to broader fuel supply disruptions, reports in April 2026 indicated significant impacts on global energy and aviation markets linked to tensions in the Strait of Hormuz during the Iran–United States conflict. Restricted maritime traffic was reported to have contributed to supply constraints in oil and jet fuel, affecting global energy flows and increasing market volatility.

The disruption contributed to sharp increases in global energy prices. Reports indicated that oil prices rose above 100 USD per barrel, while jet fuel prices increased significantly, in some cases more than doubling compared to the previous month. European markets were identified as particularly vulnerable, with concerns raised over potential fuel shortages within weeks if supply conditions did not stabilise.

Industry groups and analysts warned that continued disruption could lead to operational challenges at European airports, including potential flight cancellations and capacity constraints. The International Air Transport Association (IATA) noted that even in the event of a reopening of the Strait of Hormuz, recovery in jet fuel supply could take months due to persistent constraints in refining capacity and logistics across the region.

In response to the rising energy prices, the European Central Bank and the Bank of England left interest rates unchanged.

On October 20, 2026, the price of natural gas in Europe reached its highest level since December 2022. Disruptions in the Strait of Hormuz and lower gas storage levels compared to last year have raised concerns about energy supplies as the winter season approaches. Also, lower European gas reserves compared to the same period last year have caused prices to increase. According to reports, damage to the facilities of liquefied natural gas (LNG) producing countries in the region during the US and Israeli attacks on Iran and Tehran's retaliatory attacks have also affected the increase in gas prices and its supply to Europe.

TotalEnergies CEO Patrick Pouyanne stated that Europe is unlikely to face a gas shortage this winter but will probably encounter higher supply costs. He pointed out that Europe's earlier easing of storage rules resulted in lower reserves going into the winter season. The region is competing with Asia for liquefied natural gas (LNG) amid uncertainties stemming from the ongoing conflict involving Iran. Gas prices have risen sharply, with Dutch TTF prices more than doubling compared to previous years. Germany's gas storage levels are at an all-time low, and Pouyanne highlighted that short-term decision-making has created difficulties in the gas market, forecasting that Europe will pay more for gas than other regions. Europe is bracing for a difficult winter due to low gas supplies, according to Fatih Birol, the director of the International Energy Agency. The current conflict involving the US and Israel against Iran is causing disruptions in global supply chains, which is increasing Europe's exposure to higher liquefied natural gas (LNG) prices. Gas reserves in Europe this winter are lower than usual compared to past years.

=== Germany ===
On April 13, the German government announced tax cuts for petrol and diesel fuel for two months in response to rising prices, generating critics from some economists.

Germany's gas storage association Initiative Energien Speichern (INES) called for a review and improvement of the filling regime for the country's gas storage facilities on 1 November, after storage levels fell short of the 80% target for that date. With gas storage levels at 61.35% on 30 October, INES said the war in Iran had made refilling storage facilities over the summer economically unviable. It called for stronger measures to ensure sufficient gas reserves for future winters.

=== Ireland ===
On 7 April, a series of protests against rising fuel prices began across major road networks, cities and ports in The Republic of Ireland. The protests continued until 14 April also causing a vote of no confidence in its government.

=== Slovenia ===
On 23 March, Slovenia became the first EU country since the start of the crisis to introduce fuel rationing. Fuel purchases were limited to 50 litres per day for private motorists and 200 litres per day for businesses and farmers. This measure was enacted to curb drivers from neighbouring countries such as Austria taking advantage of lower fuel prices in Slovenia.

=== United Kingdom ===
Shipping disruption contributed to volatility in UK energy markets, with analysts warning that wholesale gas price increases could raise household energy bills and expose the country's reliance on global fuel markets. The situation also renewed political debate over the role of domestic production in the North Sea, including potential reforms to the UK's Energy Profits Levy (windfall tax) on oil and gas producers and the future of investment in the sector. However, analysts noted that additional drilling in the North Sea would be unlikely to significantly reduce UK energy bills in the short term, as most oil and gas produced there is sold on international markets at global prices. April 2026 reached the highest level of solar panel installations in the United Kingdom since 2012.

A DiscoverCars.com poll from November 2026 found that 51 per cent of the 1,100-plus motorists surveyed had changed how or when they drive to cut costs—a shift that comes amid rising fuel prices and the US–Iran conflict. Among the adjustments reported were reduced car use, walking short trips they used to drive, and greater reliance on public transport.

European gas prices have surged to levels not seen since 2022. Currently, European gas storage is approximately 75% full, compared to a seasonal average of around 80%. In the UK, the month-ahead gas contract rose by 4% to 240 pence per therm, reaching its highest level since December 2022, when prices spiked following Russia’s full-scale invasion of Ukraine. UK energy regulators have indicated that the country is likely to face some of the highest energy costs in Europe this winter due to its reliance on imports to maintain a stable supply. The UK has some of the smallest gas reserves in Europe, a consequence of decades of dependence on domestic production from the North Sea.

=== France ===
Protest in Paris on 17 October 2026

Since 18 September 2026, fuel protests emerged in France due to the Iran war and inflation from the rising fuel prices. It would turn into riots from 17 October 2026 as part as a wider French student protests. In October 2026, Emmanuel Macron secured a deal with the UAE for about 100,000 tonnes a month, with a further 100,000 tonnes a month to be secured during his visit to Bahrain.

== Middle East ==
According to the International Energy Agency (IEA), the global natural gas market has been significantly affected by geopolitical disruptions in the Middle East, resulting in a short-term supply shock and reduced availability of liquefied natural gas (LNG) in global markets. The agency reported that these developments have tightened global gas balances and increased price volatility. While global LNG supply growth is expected to continue in the medium term, the market is projected to remain tight through 2026 and 2027, depending on geopolitical conditions and infrastructure recovery.

== Oceania ==
=== Australia ===
Fuel prices at the petrol and diesel stations started soaring in early March in Australia, partly driven by panic buying. More critical to overall inflationary forces though, is the supply of diesel to drive heavy machinery. Australia's diesel is largely dependent on refineries in Singapore, South Korea, Malaysia, Taiwan and India. Experts have warned that the increased price of diesel would lead to much higher food prices, threatening both food security and the "just-in-time" logistics infrastructure that serves food retailers. Australia holds around 29 to 36 days' reserves of fuel, and a large proportion of this was released to support retailers in regional areas. If the Strait of Hormuz continues to be blocked, the Liquid Fuel Emergency Act 1984 could be triggered, which allows for formal transaction limits and rationing of fuel. This act was passed in response to the 1970s fuel crisis, and has not been triggered since then. In the meantime, the government has lowered the standard for the flash point for both diesel and petrol, which will make it easier for the country's two refineries to produce more fuel.

In mid-March, the state governments of Victoria and Tasmania made public transport free to all users, for differing fixed time periods. On 30 March 2026, the Australian Government under Prime Minister Anthony Albanese, after a meeting of National Cabinet, announced a National Fuel Security Plan, to coordinate responses across all states and territories of Australia. The four-stage plan specifies roles and responsibilities of governments and industry partners. At this point, the country was at level two, dubbed "Keeping Australia moving", after going through a preparation and planning phase. The federal government announced the cutting of fuel excise by 50%, along with a three-month pause on road user charges for trucks.

Singapore and Australia have signed an agreement to keep their energy trade flowing, with Singapore diversifying the origins of its supplies of crude oil.

=== New Zealand ===
On 12 March, the New Zealand Government released six days' worth of petroleum following a global directive by the International Energy Agency to release 400 million barrels of petrol in response to supply disruptions caused by the 2026 Iran war.

On 24 March, the New Zealand Government announced that about 143,000 working families with children would receive a $50 tax credit to help with rising fuel costs from 7 April. Another 14,000 families were also expected to be eligible for a lower tax credit.

On 27 March, the New Zealand Government released its four-level fuel alert level system in response to fuel shortages caused by the Iran conflict. That day the country was placed on the first phase, watchful, with the public advised to use fuel cautiously.

=== Other Pacific nations ===
Several governments of Pacific nations, including Samoa, Fiji, Vanuatu, and Papua New Guinea, publicly reported by the end of March that they had enough fuel reserves to continue operating for a few months. However, some officials have privately expressed concerns about the future if oil deliveries to the region are halted owing to the war, and prices have gone up in all of these countries as well as Solomon Islands, Tonga, and Marshall Islands. Officials in Samoa, Cook Islands and Fiji have warned citizens against panic buying and hoarding. Australian Foreign Minister Penny Wong and Minister for Pacific Island Affairs Pat Conroy have signalled their willingness to ensure that regional neighbours do not run out of fuel. The New Zealand Government stated that it was assessing how it could help the Pacific region, particularly the Polynesian nations.

Due to rising fuel costs, Air New Zealand has cancelled 1,100 flights in the Pacific region, affecting around 44,000 passengers.

== See also ==
- 1970–1979 world oil market chronology
- 1970s energy crisis
- 1973 oil crisis
- 1979 oil crisis
- 1980s oil glut
- 2000s energy crisis
- Economic impact of the 2026 Iran war
- Global energy crisis (2021–2023)
- 2025–2026 Russian fuel crisis
- Fuel protests in 2026
