= Parting =

Parting may refer to:

- Parting (film), a 2016 Afghan-Iranian film
- Parting.com, a funeral home directory
- Parting tradition
- Cleavage (crystal)#Parting
- Side-parting, a common male hairstyle: see Regular haircut
- PartinG (gamer), a South Korean StarCraft II player
- The Parting, an opera by Tom Cipullo
- Gold parting or just parting, a final stage in gold extraction
- "Partings" (The Lord of the Rings: The Rings of Power), an episode of the first season of The Lord of the Rings: The Rings of Power

== See also ==
- Part (disambiguation)
