= Division =

Division may refer to:

== Mathematics ==
- Division (mathematics), the inverse of multiplication
- Division algorithm, a method for computing the result of mathematical division

== Military ==
- Division (military), a formation typically consisting of 10,000 to 25,000 troops
  - Divizion, a subunit in some militaries
- Division (naval), a collection of warships

== Science ==
- Cell division, the process in which biological cells multiply
- Continental divide, the geographical term for separation between watersheds
- Division (taxonomy), used differently in botany and zoology
- Division (botany), a taxonomic rank for plants or fungi, equivalent to phylum in zoology
- Division (horticulture), a method of vegetative plant propagation, or the plants created by using this method
- Division, a medical/surgical operation involving cutting and separation, see ICD-10 Procedure Coding System

== Technology ==
- Beam compass, a compass with a beam and sliding sockets for drawing and dividing circles larger than those made by a regular pair of compasses

== Society ==
- Administrative division, territory into which a country is divided
- Census division, an official term in Canada and the United States
- Diairesis, Plato's method of definition by division
- Division (business), one of the parts into which a business is divided, to structurally organise the company
- Division (political geography), a name for a subsidiary state or prefecture of a country
- Division (sport), a group of teams in organised sport who compete for a divisional title
- In parliamentary procedure:
  - Division of the assembly, a type of formally recorded vote by assembly members
  - Division of a question, to split a question into two or more questions
- Partition (politics), the process of changing national borders or separating political entities
- Police division, a large territorial unit of the British police

== Places ==
- Division station (CTA Blue Line), a station on the Chicago Transit Authority's 'L' system, serving the Blue Line
- Division station (CTA North Side Main Line), formerly a station on the Chicago Transit Authority's North Side Main Line
- Division station (CTA Logan Square branch), formerly a station on the Logan Square branch of the Chicago "L"
- Division Mountain, on the Continental Divide along the Alberta - British Columbia border of Canada
- Division Range, Humboldt County, Nevada

== Music ==
- Division (10 Years album), 2008
- Division (The Gazette album), 2012
- Divisions (album), by Starset, 2019
- Division (music), a type of ornamentation or variation found in early music
- "Division", a song by Aly & AJ from Insomniatic, 2007
- "D/vision", a song by JID from The Never Story, 2017

== Other uses ==
- Division of the field, a concept in heraldry
- Division (architecture), a vertical or horizontal partitioning of a facade
- Division (logical fallacy), when one reasons logically that something true of a thing must also be true of all or some of its parts
- Tom Clancy's The Division, a multiplayer video game by Ubisoft and Red Storm Entertainment
- The Division (TV series), a police procedural

== See also ==
- Dvsn, Canadian musical group
- Dividend, payments made by a corporation to its shareholder members
- Compartment (disambiguation)
- Div (disambiguation)
- Divide (disambiguation)
- Division Street (disambiguation)
- Partition (disambiguation)
- Section (disambiguation)
- Segment (disambiguation)
- Split (disambiguation)
- Subdivision (disambiguation)
