= Association of Car Rental Industry Systems Standards =

European economic interest grouping

The Association of Car Rental Industry Systems Standards (ACRISS) is an industry body for car rental companies in Europe, the Middle East and Africa. Amongst the standards produced by ACRISS is the Car Classification Code.

== History ==
ACRISS was formed in 1989 by Avis, Budget, Europcar and Hertz. In 1992, ACRISS was reconstituted as a European economic interest grouping.

Current ACRISS members include Alamo, Avis, Budget, Enterprise, Europcar, Hertz, Maggiore, Blacklane, Car Rental Gateway, Amadeus, fr:Karhoo, GroundScope, Rentalcars.com, Sabre, TaxiTender, Travelport, Mycab, National Car Rental, Payless, Dollar, Discover Cars, Travelport, and Skyscanner (joined May 2025).

== Objectives ==
The objectives of ACRISS are "to develop clear common standards for Car Rental services and Transfers (Vehicle with Driver Service Industry) in Europe, Middle East & Africa." ACRISS has developed standardised codes for classifying cars (including the optional equipment that is fitted), optional extras, airport locations and locations in general.

== Car Classification Code ==
The car classification code has been created to allow car rental companies to communicate the characteristics of a car using a standardised system, in order to prevent misleading information when booking a rental car. The code describes the category, body style, transmission, driven wheels (FWD, RWD or AWD), fuel type (or electric/hybrid vehicle) and whether air-conditioning is fitted.

Category
M: Mini
N: Mini Elite
E: Economy
H: Economy Elite
C: Compact
D: Compact Elite
I: Intermediate
J: Intermediate Elite
S: Standard
R: Standard Elite
F: Fullsize
G: Fullsize Elite
P: Premium
U: Premium Elite
L: Luxury
W: Luxury Elite
O: Oversize
X: Special

Type
B: 2-3 Door
C: 2/4 Door
D: 4-5 Door
W: Wagon/Estate
V: Passenger Van
L: Limousine
S: Sport
T: Convertible
F: SUV
J: Open Air All Terrain
X: Special
P: Pick up Regular Cab
Q: Pick up Extended Cab
Z: Special Offer Car
E: Coupe
M: Monospace
R: Recreational Vehicle
H: Motor Home
Y: 2 Wheel Vehicle
N: Roadster
G: Crossover
K: Commercial Van/Truck

Trans / Driven wheels
M: Manual (drive unspecified)
N: Manual 4WD
C: Manual AWD
A: Auto (drive unspecified)
B: Auto 4WD
D: Auto AWD

Fuel / air-con
R: Unspecified Fuel With Air Conditioning (AC)
N: Unspecified Fuel Without AC
D: Diesel With AC
Q: Diesel Without AC
H: Hybrid (With AC)
I: Hybrid Plug-in (With AC)
E: Electric (With AC)
C: Electric (With AC)
L: LPG/Compressed Gas With AC
S: LPG/Compressed Gas Without AC
A: Hydrogen With AC
B: Hydrogen Without AC
M: Multi Fuel/Power With AC
F: Multi Fuel/Power Without AC
V: Petrol With AC
Z: Petrol Without AC
U: Ethanol With AC
X: Ethanol Without AC

Examples:

- IDAD – Intermediate category, 4/5 doors, automatic transmission, diesel engine, air-conditioning fitted
- ECMQ – Economy category, 2/4 doors, manual transmission, diesel engine, no air-conditioning
- PCAV – Premium category, 2/4 doors, automatic transmission, petrol engine, air-conditioning fitted
- IGDV – Intermediate Crossover vehicle, automatic transmission, petrol engine, air-conditioning fitted

== See also ==
- Euro Car Segment
