= Compartment =

Compartment may refer to:

== Biology ==
- Compartment (anatomy), a space of connective tissue between muscles
- Compartment (chemistry), in which different parts of the same protein molecule serve different functions
- Compartment (development), fields of cells of distinct cell lineage, cell affinity, and genetic identity
- Compartment (pharmacokinetics), a defined and distinct volume of body fluids
- Cellular compartment, a closed part within a cell, surrounded by a membrane

== Other uses ==
- Compartment coach, a railway car divided into separate areas or compartments, with no means of moving between them
- Compartment (ship), subdivision of the space within a ship
- Compartment (heraldry), the part of a coat of arms design which appears immediately below the shield
- Multi-compartment model, a type of mathematical model
- "Compartments", a song and album by José Feliciano
- Hidden compartment

== See also ==
- Compartmentalization (disambiguation)
- Apartment
- Division (disambiguation)
- Section (disambiguation)
