= Section =

Section, Sectioning, or Sectioned may refer to:

== Arts, entertainment, and media ==
=== Books ===
- Section (bookbinding), a group of sheets, folded in the middle, bound into the binding together
- Section (typography), a subdivision, especially of a chapter, in books and documents
  - Section sign (§), typographical characters

=== Film, TV, video games ===
- The Outpost (1995 film), also known as The Section
- "Sectioning" (Peep Show), a 2005 television episode
- David "Section" Mason, a fictional character in Call of Duty: Black Ops II

=== Music ===
- Section, an instrumental group within an orchestra
- The Section (band), a 1970s American instrumental rock band
- Section (music), a complete, but not independent, musical idea
- "Section", a song by 2 Chainz from the 2016 album ColleGrove
- "Section", a song by Nettspend

== Organisations ==
- Section (Alpine club)
- Section (military unit)
- Section (Scouting)

== Science, technology and mathematics ==
=== Science ===
- Histological section, a thin slice of tissue used for microscopic examination, achieved by sectioning
- Section (archaeology), a view in part of the archaeological sequence showing it in the vertical plane
- Section (taxonomy), a taxonomic rank that is applied differently between botany and zoology
  - Section (botany)
- Section (geology), a diagram representing geologic features intersecting a vertical plane

=== Mathematics ===
- Conic section, intersection of a cone and a plane
- Section (category theory), a right inverse of some morphism
  - Section (fiber bundle), in topology
  - Part of a sheaf (mathematics)
- Section (group theory), a quotient object of a subobject

=== Other uses in science and technology ===
- <section>, an HTML5 element
- Sectioning (car), a customization of hot rod cars

== Surveying ==
- Section (United States land surveying), an area nominally one square mile
- Section, an area of one square mile in Dominion Land Survey, Western Canada
- Section, part of the Alberta Township System

== Other uses ==
- Section (rail transport), a portion of railway line or a portion of a train
- Section, Alabama, a town in the United States
- Sectioning, involuntary commitment for severe mental illness

== See also ==
- Caesarean section, or C-section, the use of surgery to deliver babies
- Cross section (disambiguation)
- Division (disambiguation)
- Part (disambiguation)
- Sectional (disambiguation)
- Sector (disambiguation)
- Segment (disambiguation)
