= Part =

Part, parts or PART may refer to:

== People ==
- Part (surname)
- Parts (surname)

== Arts, entertainment, and media ==
- Part (music), a single strand or melody or harmony of music within a larger ensemble or a polyphonic musical composition
- Part (bibliography), a sub-division of a volume or journal
- Parts (book), a 1997 children's book by Tedd Arnold
- Character (arts), in acting, a person or other being in a performed narrative

== Transportation ==
- Pottstown Area Rapid Transit (PART), Pennsylvania, U.S.
- Putnam Area Rapid Transit (PART), New York, U.S.
- Piedmont Authority for Regional Transportation (PART), North Carolina, U.S.

== Other uses ==
- Part (mathematics) or Mereology, the study of parts and the wholes they form
- Part-of, the semantic relation of a part to the whole specific to linguistics
- Spare part, an interchangeable part used for repair
- Part number, identifier of a particular part design in engineering
- Part (haircut), a hairstyle
- Parts of Lincolnshire, geographic divisions of the English county
- Primary age-related tauopathy, a neuropathological designation

== See also ==
- Body part (disambiguation)
- Element (disambiguation)
- Particle (disambiguation)
- Parting (disambiguation)
- Partition (disambiguation)
- System
- Unit (disambiguation)
