= S-segment =

Car size classification in Europe

2020 Best-Selling

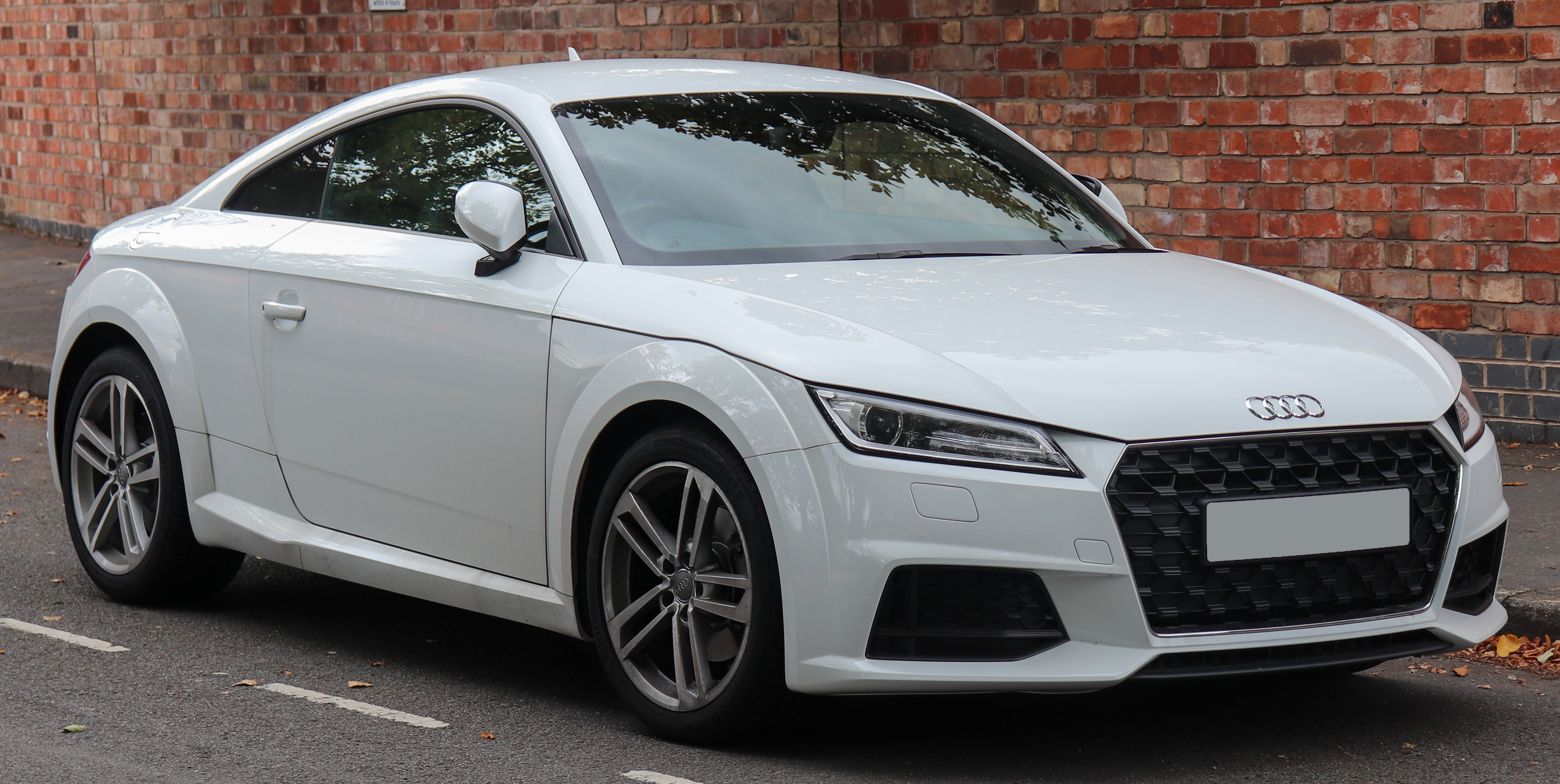
Audi TT (1998–2023)

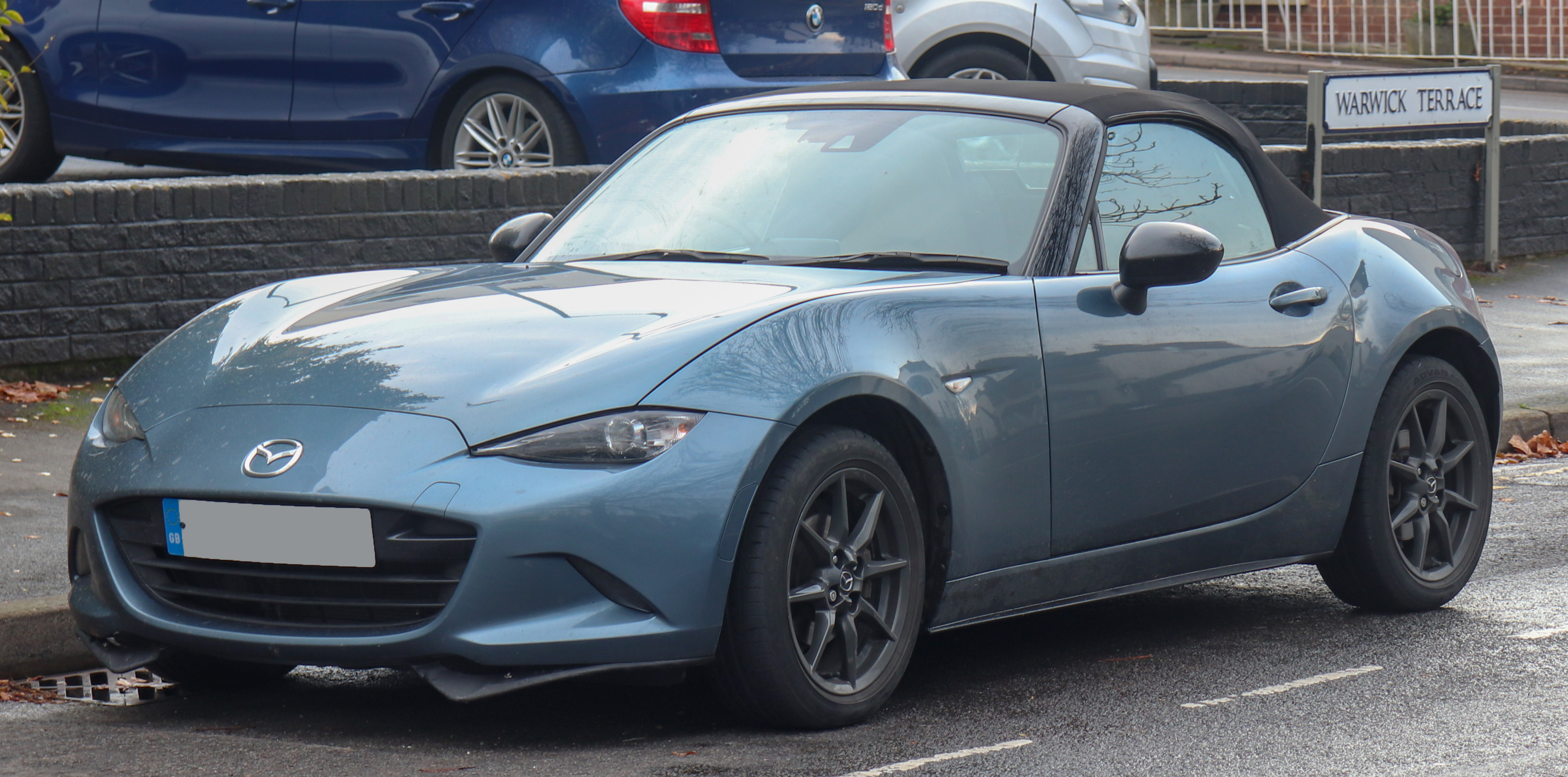
Mazda MX-5 (1989–present)

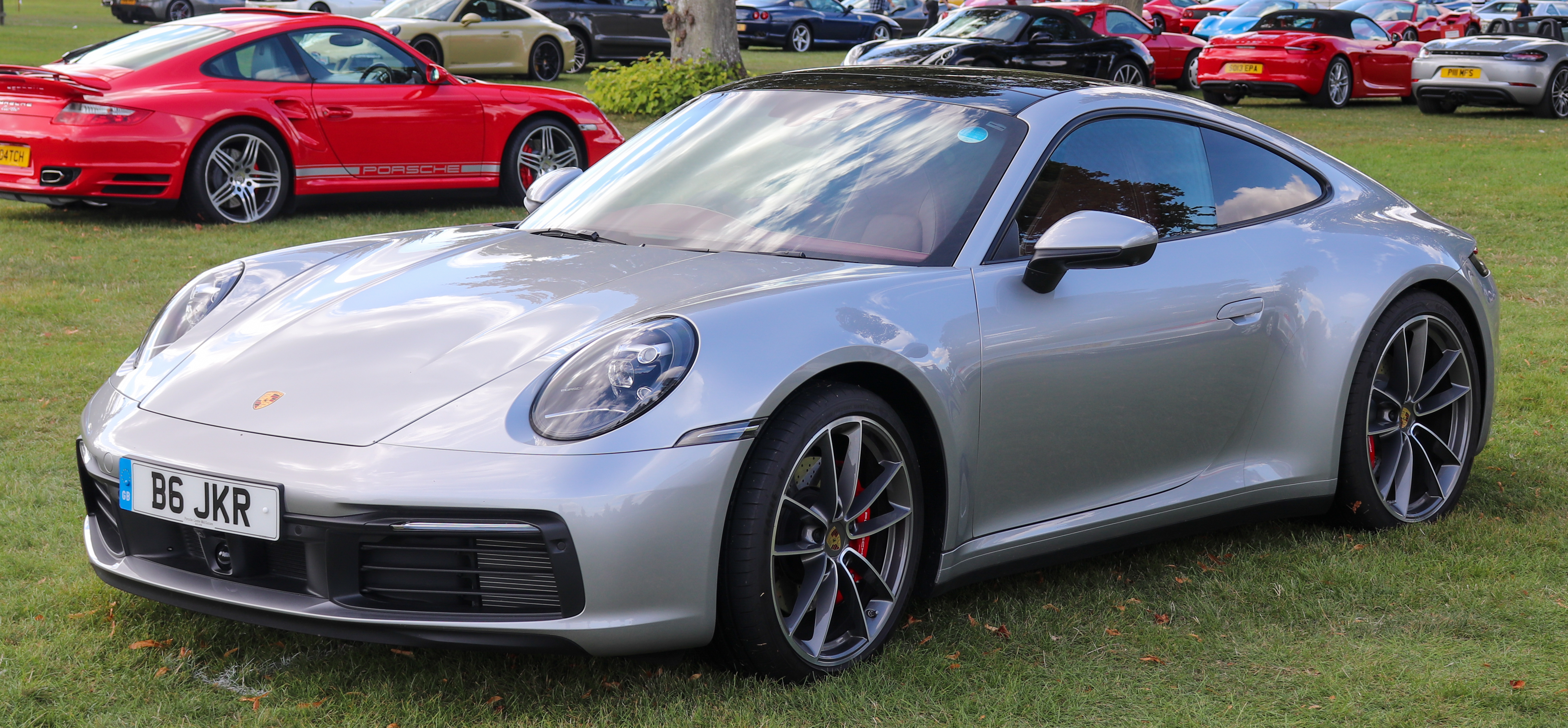
Porsche 911 (1963–present)

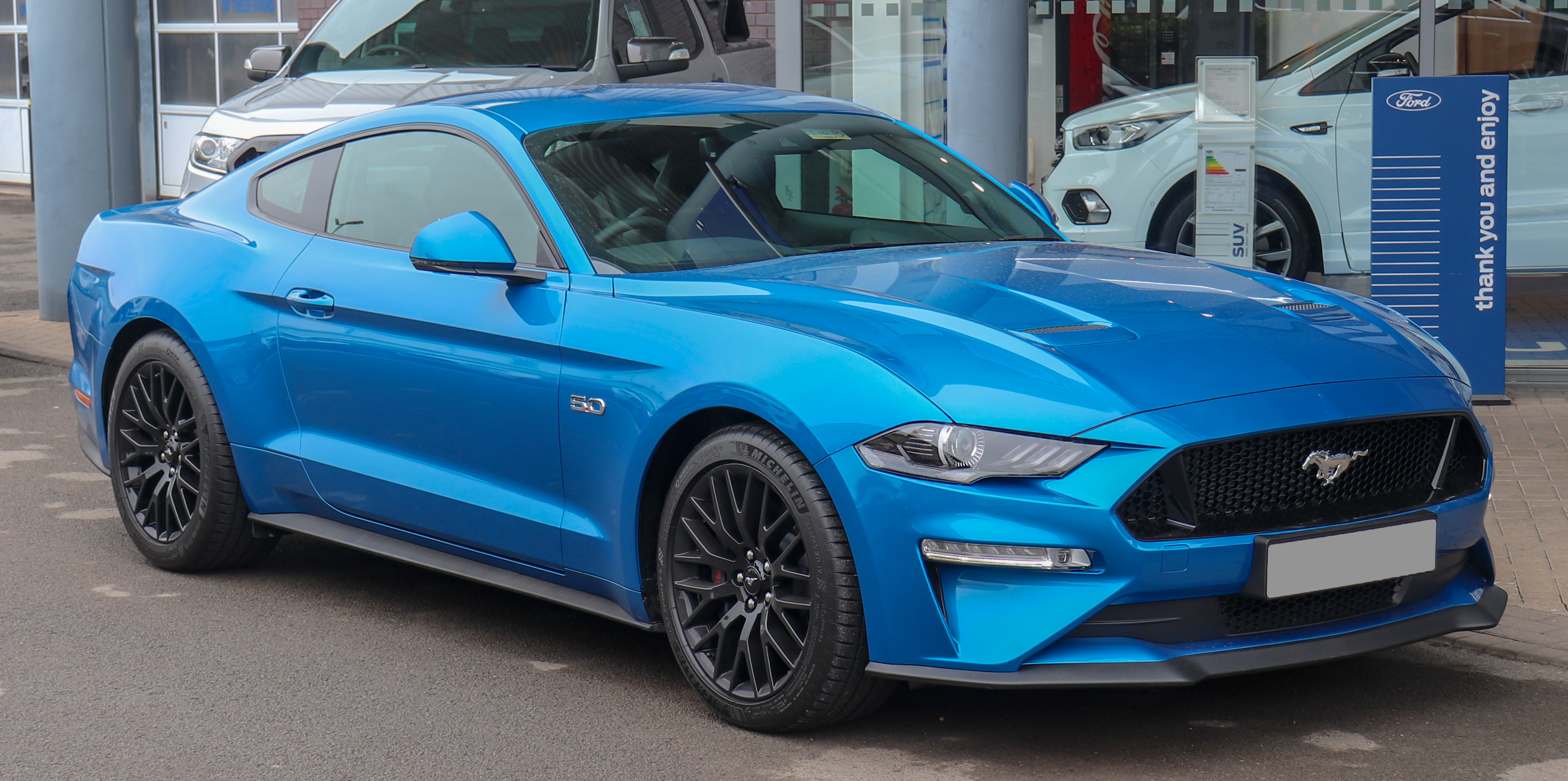
Ford Mustang (1964–present)

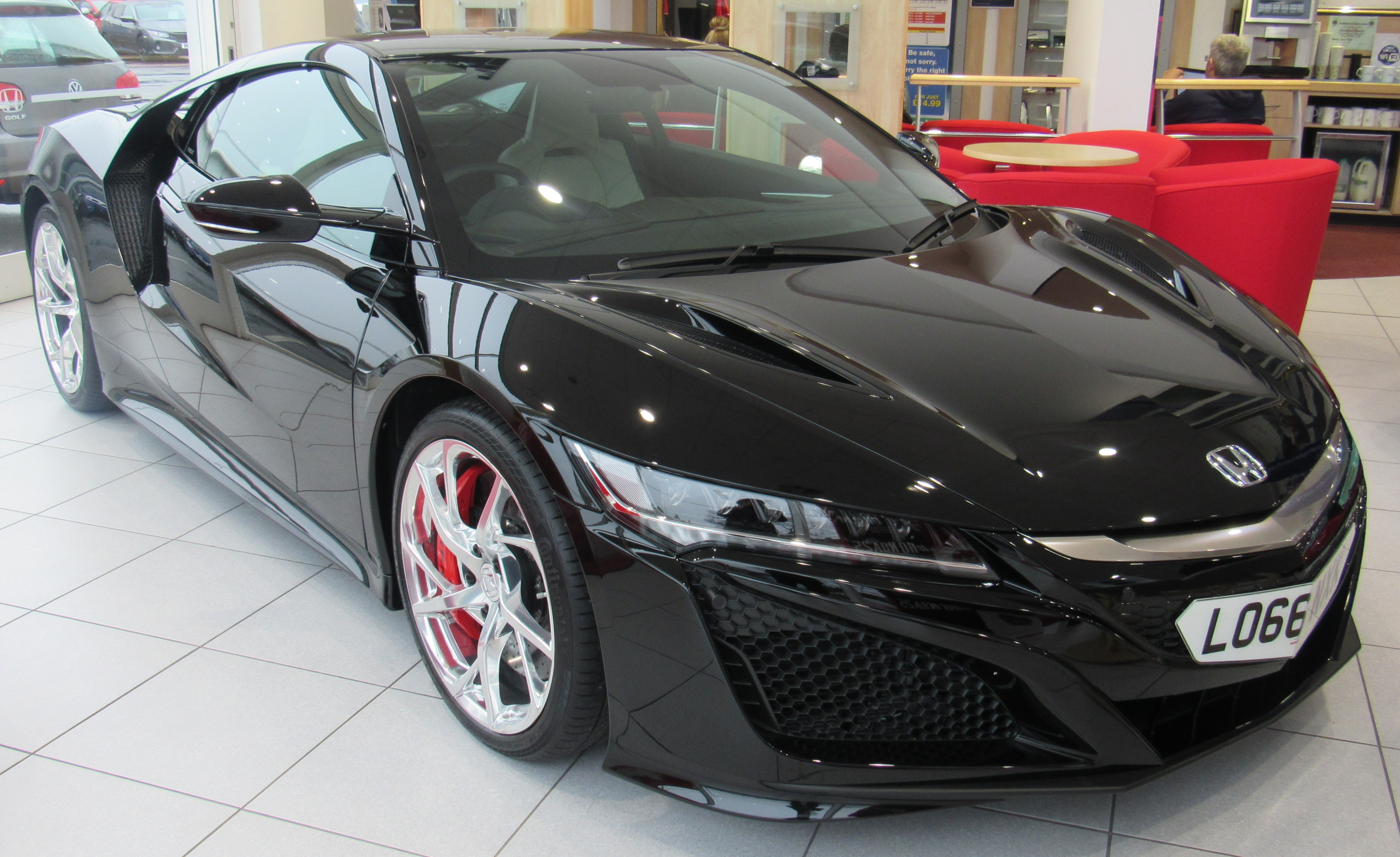
Honda NSX (2016–2022)

S-segment cars are a European car segment class for sports coupés. The equivalent Euro NCAP class is called "roadster sport".

== Characteristics ==
S-segment cars have a sporting appearance and are usually designed to have superior handling and straight-line acceleration compared to other segments. The most common body styles for S-segment cars are coupé and convertible. Rear passenger accommodation is not a priority for S-segment cars, therefore many models are either two-seat cars or have a 2+2 layout with relatively cramped rear seating.

Most recent S-segment cars use the commonplace front-engine design (as either an FF layout, FR layout or F4 layout), however the majority of cars with a mid-engine design or rear-engine design belong to the S-segment.

== Current models ==
The four highest selling S-segment cars in Europe are the Mazda MX-5, Porsche 911, Ford Mustang and Porsche Boxster/Cayman.

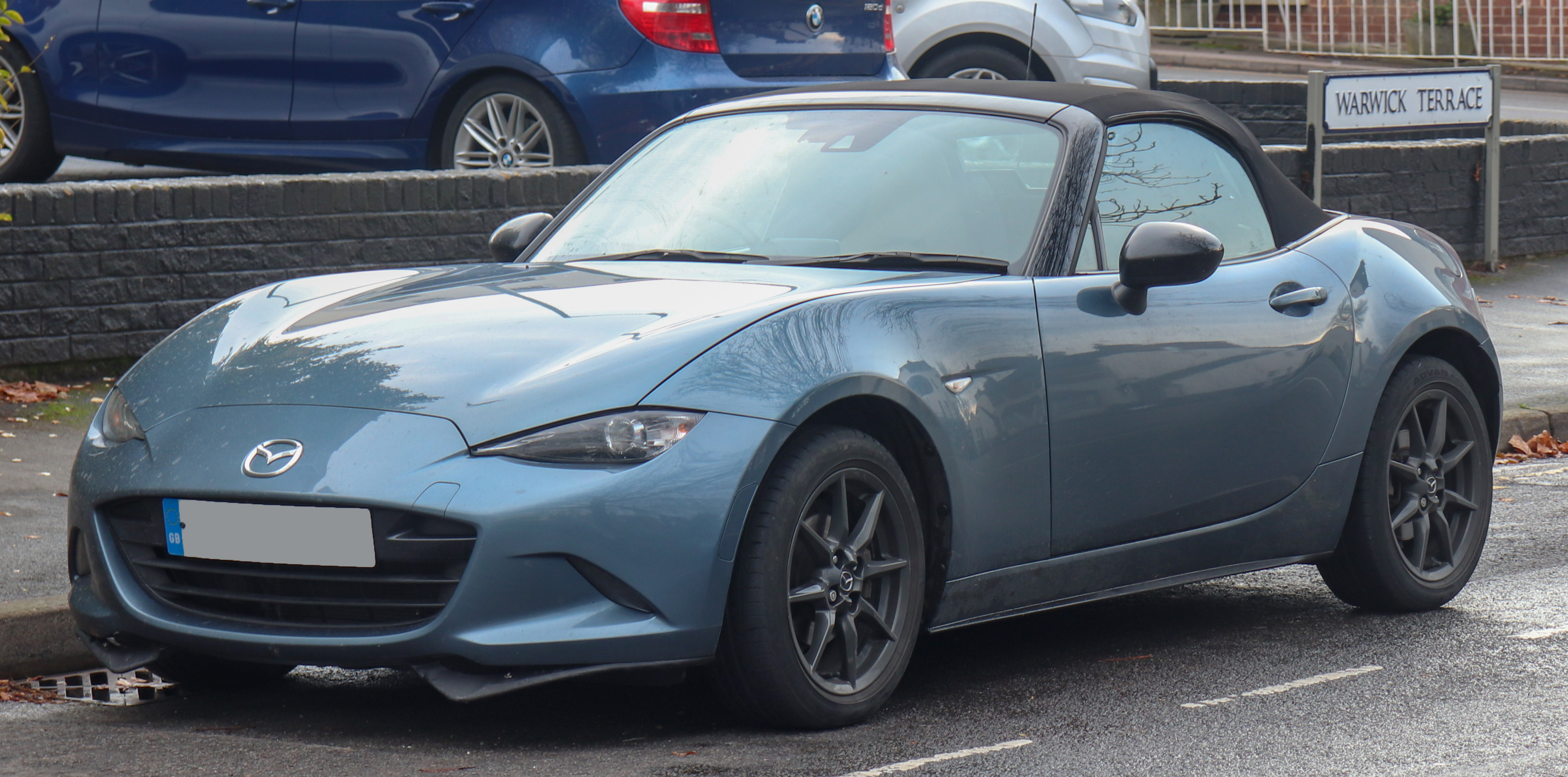
Mazda MX-5 (1989–present)

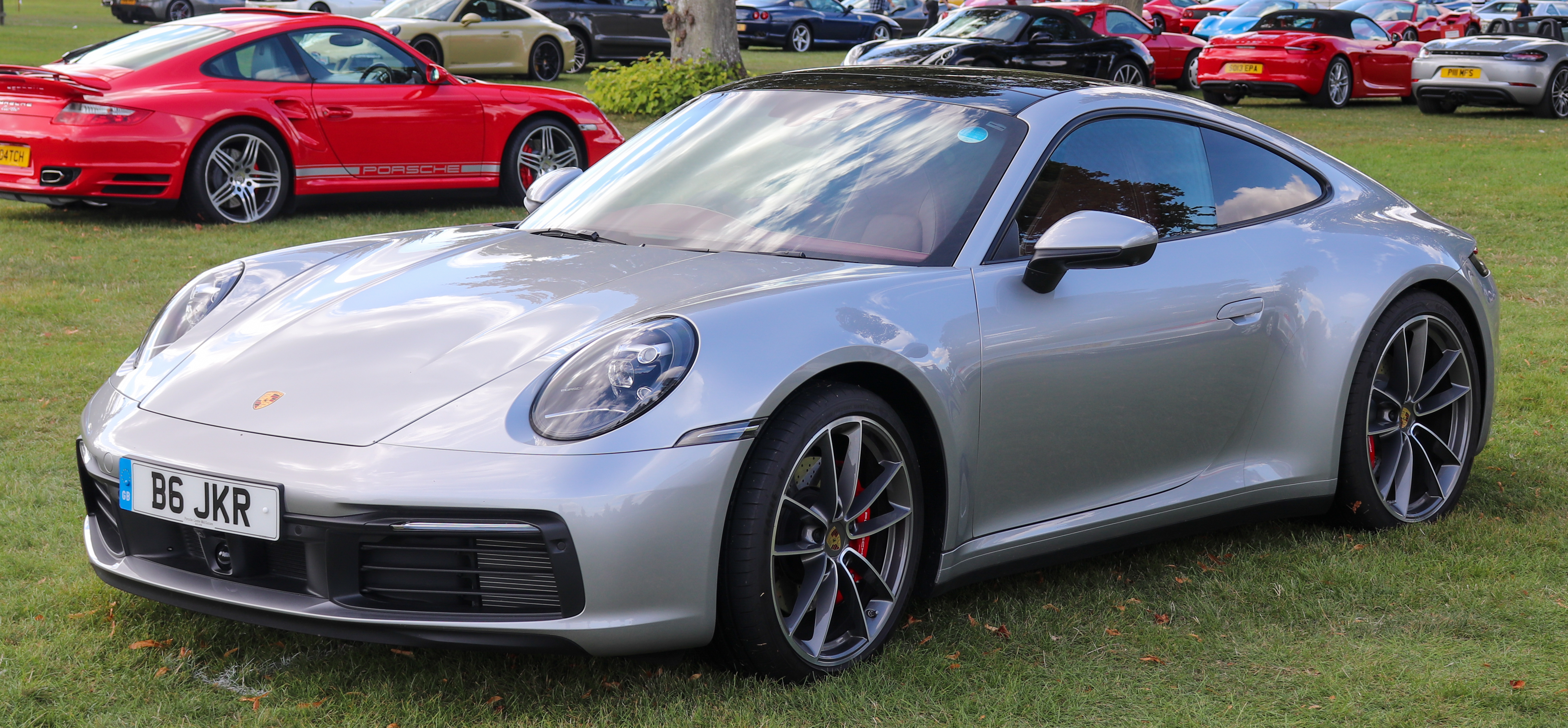
Porsche 911 (1963–present)

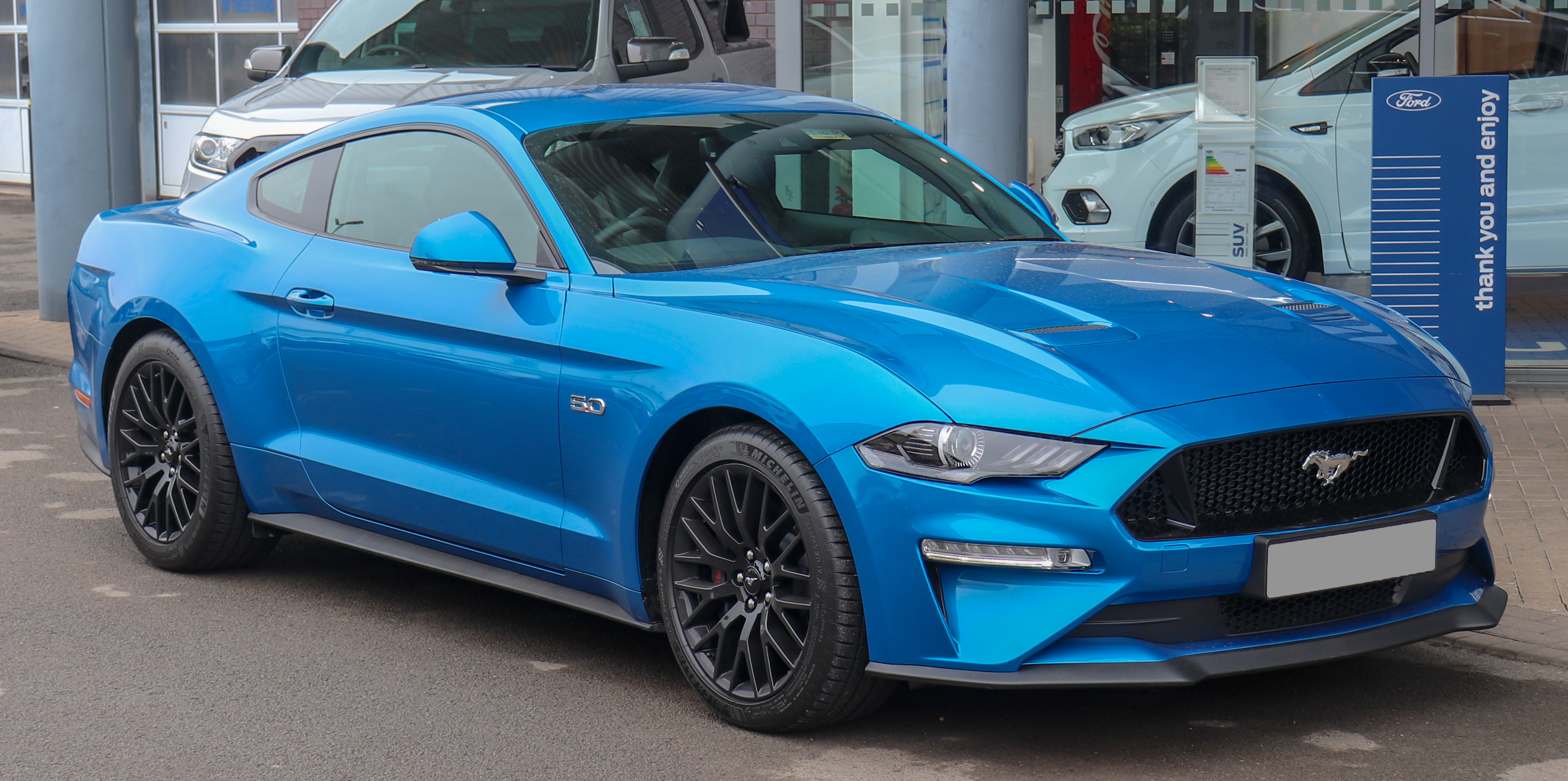
Ford Mustang (1964–present)

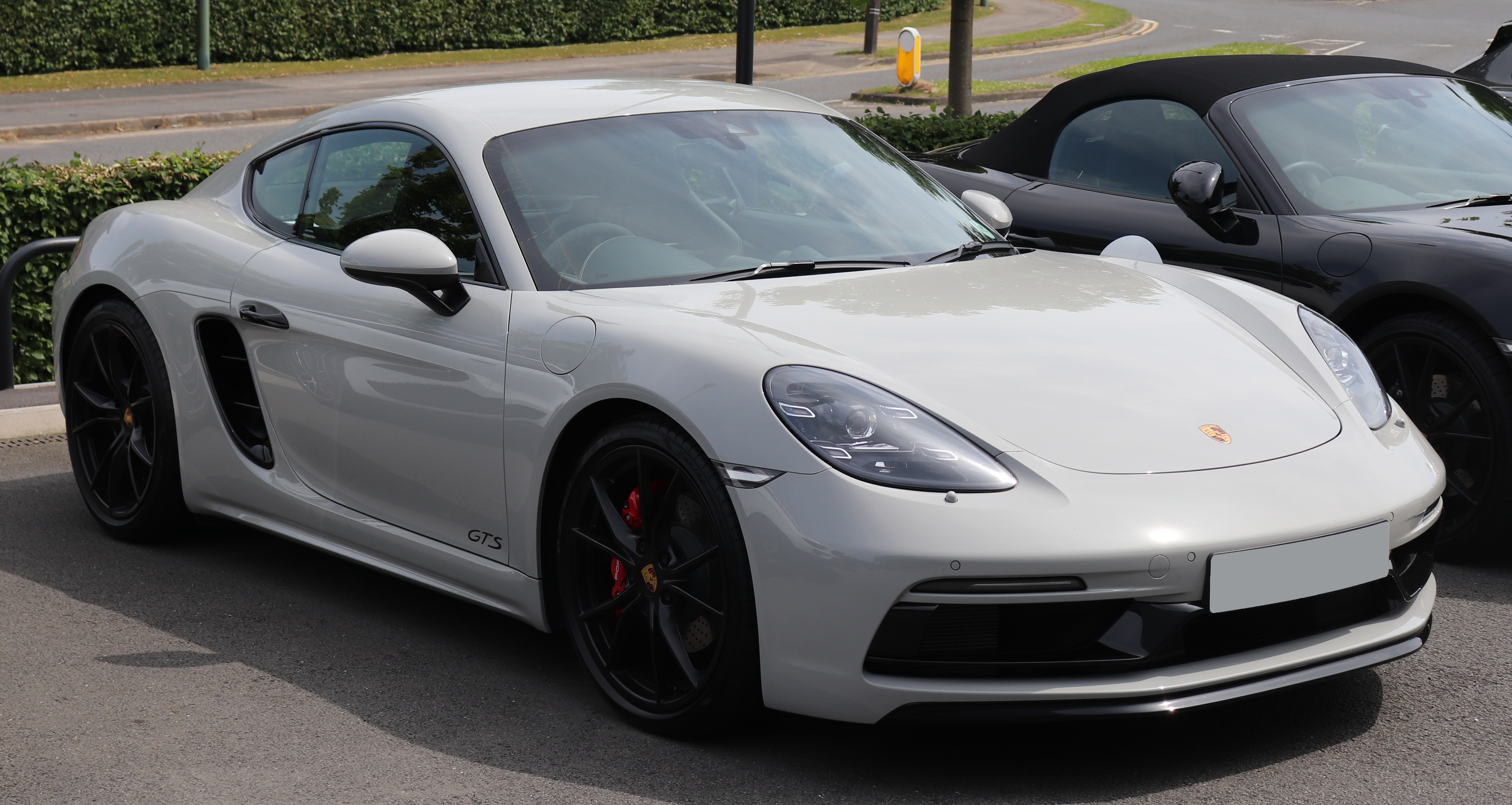
Porsche Cayman (2005–present)

== European sales figures ==
Sports cars
2017 rank	Manufacturer	Model	2013 sales	2014 sales	2015 sales	2016 sales	2017 sales	% change (2016–2017)
1	Audi	TT	12,331	9,768	22,417	20,922	16,281	▼ –22.2%
2	Mazda	MX-5	6,050	5,786	6,746	13,677	15,769	▲ +15.3%
3	Porsche	911	12,369	12,987	14,386	15,550	15,053	▼ –3.2%
4	Ford	Mustang	635	556	4,889	15,204	13,241	▼ –12.9%
5	Porsche	718 Boxster	—	—	147	3,144	8,438	▲ +168.4%
6	Mercedes-Benz	SLC-Class	—	—	—	6,716	7,879	▲ +17.3%
7	Fiat	124 Spider	—	—	—	3,717	7,831	▲ +110.7%
8	Jaguar	F-Type	2,750	4,641	4,557	4,541	4,538	▼ –0.1%
9	Mercedes-AMG	GT	—	71	2,508	2,372	2,443	▲ +3.0%
10	Chevrolet	Camaro	1,496	932	367	607	1,592	▲ +162.3%

Supercars
2017 rank	Manufacturer	Model	2013 sales	2014 sales	2015 sales	2016 sales	2017 sales	% change (2016–2017)
1	Ferrari	488 GTB	—	—	247	1,286	1,519	▲ +18.1%
2	Bentley	Continental GT	1,657	1,595	1,631	1,705	1,512	▼ –11.3%
3	Aston Martin	DB11	—	—	—	155	1,249	▲ +705.8%
4	Lamborghini	Huracán	—	220	502	529	661	▲ +25.0%
5	Aston Martin	Vanquish	379	320	365	247	359	▲ +45.3%
6	Lamborghini	Aventador	226	238	250	369	322	▼ –12.7%
7	Ferrari	F12berlinetta	624	418	296	387	261	▼ –32.6%
8	Rolls-Royce	Dawn	—	—	—	258	235	▼ –8.9%
9	Rolls-Royce	Wraith	74	313	242	205	217	▲ +5.9%
10	Honda	NSX	-	-	-	-	126	New

In 2014, the five highest selling coupé models were the BMW 4 Series, Opel Astra GTC, BMW 2 Series, Renault Mégane Coupé and Mercedes-Benz C-Class (W204). The five highest selling convertible models in 2014 were the Fiat 500C, Mini Hatch, BMW 4 Series (F32), Volkswagen Beetle (A5) and Volkswagen Golf Mk6.

== See also ==
- Euro Car Segment
- Car classifications
- Coupé
- Convertible
- Grand tourer
- Muscle car
- Sports car
- Supercar
