= Euro Car Segment =

Semi-formal European car size classification

Excepting those of the Europe-wide safety assessment program Euro NCAP, vehicle segments in Europe do not have formal characterization or regulations. Although the definition is vague, there is little overlap between segments A–F based on weight and size parameters.

Models segments tend to be based on comparison to well-known brand models. For example, a car such as the Volkswagen Golf might be described as being in the Ford Focus size class, or vice versa. The VW Polo is smaller, so it belongs one segment below the Golf, while the bigger Passat is one segment above.

The names of the segments were mentioned, but not defined, in 1999 in an EU document titled Case No COMP/M.1406 Hyundai / Kia Regulation (EEC) No 4064/89 Merger Procedure.

Code	Meaning	approx. length	Example	Equivalent categories	Image
A	mini	2.7–3.7 m (8.9–12.1 ft)	Fiat 500	City; Minicompact (US); A00-class (China)	
B	small	3.7–4.2 m (12.1–13.8 ft)	Toyota Yaris	Supermini (UK); Subcompact (US); A0-class (China)	
C	medium	4.2–4.6 m (13.8–15.1 ft)	Toyota Corolla	Small family/subcompact executive (UK); Compact (US); A-class (China)	
D	large	4.6–4.8 m (15.1–15.7 ft)	Opel Insignia	Large family/compact executive (UK); Mid-size (US); B-class (China)	
E	executive	4.8–5.0 m (15.7–16.4 ft)	BMW 5 Series	Executive (UK); Full-size (US); C-class (China)	
F	luxury	5.1 m (16.7 ft) and above	Mercedes-Benz S-Class	Luxury saloon (UK); Full-size luxury (US); D-class (China); Oberklasse (Germany)	
J	sport utility	Follows A-F as JA-JF See also: Crossover (automobile)	Jeep Wrangler		
M	multi-purpose	Loosely follows B-F as Mini MPV, Compact MPV, Minivan	Volkswagen ID. Buzz		
S	sports	Usually D-F sized	Audi TT		

== See also ==
- Association of Car Rental Industry Systems Standards
- Car body style
- Car classification
- Truck classification
- Vehicle size class
