= Segmentation in the human nervous system =

Segmentation is the physical characteristic by which the human body is divided into repeating subunits called segments arranged along a longitudinal axis. In humans, the segmentation characteristic observed in the nervous system is of biological and evolutionary significance. Segmentation is a crucial developmental process involved in the patterning and segregation of groups of cells with different features, generating regional properties for such cell groups and organizing them both within the tissues as well as along the embryonic axis.

== Introduction ==
Human nervous system consists of the central nervous system (CNS), which comprises the brain and spinal cord, and the peripheral nervous system (PNS) comprising the nerve fibers that branch off from the spinal cord to all parts of the body. Both parts of the nervous system are actively involved in communicating signals between various parts of the body to ensure the smooth and efficient transfer of information that controls and coordinates the movement of muscles, and regulates organ functions. Neurons, which form the elemental unit of the nervous system, receive messages from their dendrites, relay the information as an electrical signal down the axon and releases chemical messengers known as neurotransmitters, thus converting the electrical signal into a chemical signal.

== Segmentation ==
Segmentation is a crucial patterning process that is involved in the development of both the central nervous system and peripheral nervous system. In the central nervous system, segmentation is involved in the patterning of the neuronal population. Added to that, segmentation guides the developing axons and contribute to the development of the peripheral nervous system. In bilateral animals, the fundamental body plan involves the left and right sides as mirror images to each other with a hollow tube of gut cavity from mouth to anus along with a nerve cord with a structure named ganglion for each segment of the body. In fact, most evolutionary evidences point to the postulate that segmentation is an independent evolutionary event that arose multiple times and that the cellular and molecular pathways of segmentation might show differences in different contexts due to this fact.

== Biological significance of segmentation ==
The nervous system segmentation confers several developmental advantages to the vertebrate body as humans possess a body plan that is bilaterally segmented at the nervous system level. The segmentation is involved at all levels of the human nervous system with increasing level of complexity in the innervation from the brain to limbs. The presence of conserved features in various species of animals serves as a strong point to the nervous system’s origin from a common ancestor. Also, the neural segments form the basic building block of the human nervous system and these sub units possess their own level of autonomy in both the singular and collective sense. The segments that compose the nervous system, although initially similar in their composition, are later modified by gene expression patterns that are specific to them. Segmental pattern in human beings can be observed clearly during early developmental phase.

== Embryonic process of segmentation ==
In humans, the spinal cord comprises a major part of the central nervous system (CNS). Along with the brain, it develops from the dorsal nerve cord in the embryonic stage. The spinal cord consists of such segmental enlargements called ganglia. These ganglia form the basis for the peripheral nervous system’s (PNS) sensory and motor neurons that innervate various parts of the body. The vertebral segmentation is a process that forms a distinctive feature of the group. At first, somites form as a spherical epithelial structure with a central lumen lined by radially arranged cells. Structures such as mesenchymal sclerotome which later develop as the vertebral column along with notochord, and dermomyotome which further divides to form two types of cells, develop from these somites. The sequential epithelialization of the mesodermal mesenchymal rods lead to the formation of somites and the vertebrae originate from these structures. In higher vertebrates such as humans, the segmental plates are laid down during the process of gastrulation and the segmental plates appear on both sides of the mid-line neural epithelium. Later, the process of neurulation occurs in the mid-line and the segmental plates proceed to the side of the neural tube and notochord. Even though mitotic cell divisions create more cells within these plates, the length of the plates is maintained constant. Although intercellular connections mechanisms such as gap junctions and tight junctions are formed in the cells of the segmental plates, tight junctions are not involved in large network of cells as observed commonly in mature epithelium. A cell-cell adhesion chemical, namely calcium dependent N-cadherin, is present at varying concentrations in the anterior and posterior parts as it is expressed at a higher concentration in the anterior portion of the segmental plate and at lower concentration at the posterior part. During segmentation, the concentration of N-cadherin increases at the apical portion of the cell surface. Later, the ventromedial part of the somite is dis-aggregated from the sclerotome after a measurable loss of immunoreactivity of N-cadherin in this region. The observed change in the concentration of this chemical exemplifies the role of the mediatory molecular mechanism in the cell-cell adhesion during the formation of somites.

The segmentation pattern observed in the spinal nerves is in fact governed by the somatic mesoderm. In the embryonic stages of higher vertebrates including humans, the segmentation of these spinal nerves follows the directions from both the anterior (A, cranial) and posterior (P, caudal) sections of the somite mesoderm. The segmentation pattern observed in the peripheral nervous system (PNS) derives itself from the paraxial mesoderm. The paraxial mesoderm is arranged along the sides of the notochord and neural tube as repetitive structures called somites. In fact, somites are one of the first embryonic structures to display segmentation. Structures associated with the peripheral nervous system (PNS) such as dorsal root ganglia (DRG) develop a segmental alignment with the somites. In fact, the axons from the developing embryo neurons work under the direction of a variety of long-range and short-range cues. These cues are responsible for the determination of the trajectory of the neuron, and the mechanism of their development. Axons can follow various mechanisms including attractive/permissive or repulsive /inhibitory pathways of development. The confinement of the axons arising from the dorsal root ganglia (DRG), the neural crest cells and the motor neurons from ventral neural tube to the anterior portion of the mesodermal somite is a striking feature in higher vertebrates.

== Cellular mechanism of segmentation ==
In the development of the vertebrate nervous system, specific cues are instrumental in guiding the growing axons. The axons of motor neurons and sensory neurons develop from the neural tube region and through each of successive somite’s anterior. The 180 degree antero-posterior rotation of the neural tube segment about the somites shows that segmentation is not an intrinsic phenomenon in the neural tube. This was done by experiments involving the rotation of neural tube relative to the somitic mesoderm to position it opposite to the anterior and posterior half of the somite. These studies showed the confinement of the growth of axons to the anterior portion of the somite proving the lack of intrinsic segmentation. A 180 degree antero-posterior rotation of the somitic mesoderm, keeping the neural tube unperturbed, showed the confinement of axonal growth to the original anterior half of the somites thus showing how neural segmentation results from somites. As a matter of fact, it has been experimentally proven that as the embryonic axis is unable to regulate positional distortions, it is vital to have antero-posterior distinction clearly determined prior to or during the process of somite segmentation. The confinement of axonal growth to the anterior half derives itself from the special properties of the somites as only anterior cells allow the growth of axons and posterior cells inhibit it. Even though the later axons are seen to emerge opposite to the posterior half-sclerotomes initially and turn towards the anterior half-sclerotome later during development, the first axons from the neural tube emerge opposite to the anterior half-sclerotome only.

== Gene expression and segmentation ==
Segmentation in the hind-brain and paraxial mesoderm is highly regulated by the expression of the Hox gene. Hox genes encode helix-turn-helix transcription factors and play the major role in specifying the positional identities for tissues along the anterior-posterior axis (A-P axis) during the developmental phase. Humans, like other vertebrates have a total of 39 Hox genes organized into four different clusters. The property of Hox genes called colinearity, whereby the gene arrangement, timing and the boundaries of expression on the A-P axis are correlated, is instrumental in the development of ordered domains of expression. The Hox gene expression leads to the development of unique combination codes for the different segments that specify their distinct identity. Even though the development of segmentation in the hind-brain and paraxial mesoderm are distinct, the Hox expression in both system are coordinated with the process of morphological segmentation.

== Somitogenesis ==
The highly regulated process of formation of somites from the unsegmented presomitic mesoderm (PSM) is called somitogenesis. Somitogenesis involves three basic steps: - metameric pattern generation, labelling each somite with its antero-posterior identity, and forming a somatic border. The regularity in the arrangement of somites is due to the activity of a set of dynamically and rhythmically expressed genes in the PSM, namely c-hairyl and lunatic fringe. These genes are arguably related to the Notch signalling pathway which provides evidence for the presence of a molecular segmentation clock that is linked to the process of somitogenesis. The Notch signalling pathway is a crucial step in the embryonic segmentation in vertebrates playing multiple roles as it is one of the significant pathways involved in the regulation of the segmentation clock. Somitogenesis is a vital process that forms the foundation of the nervous system segmentation pattern.

== Segmentation in the central and peripheral nervous system ==
In the vertebrate central nervous system (CNS), there are three major segments with distinct morphological and developmental characteristics namely - prosomeric, rhombomeric, and spinal. Even though other groups of organisms in the protostome taxa, the compartmentalization of the vertebrate brain into segments along the anterior – posterior axis (AP- axis) is a characteristic feature of the group. The peripheral nervous system segmentation is highly influenced by the metameric mesodermal somites. The morphogenic rearrangement of somites into dermamyotome formed from the dorsal part of the somite and sclerotome happens while maintaining the segmental pattern. Dermamyotome, which retains the epithelial properties of its origin, forms the dermis and skeletal muscle, while sclerotome gives rise to the vertebral column and ribs. The selective outgrowth of motor and sensory axons through the anterior sclerotome of the somites forms the fundamental reason behind the observed nervous system segmentation in the spinal nerves. As a matter of fact, the molecular differences within each somite has a profound influence on the movement of the neural crest cell, motor axon, and sensory axon as there are attractive and inhibitory cues involved in the development of these structures. Molecules such as butyrlcholinesterase, tenascin and the M7412 antigen that have restricted expression in the anterior sclerotome of somite have been shown to have minimal effect on segmentation. In addition, the lack of involvement of molecules such as fibronectin and laminin which are widely expressed in the somite in the process of segmentation suggests that the role of the anterior sclerotome of somite on the PNS segmentation is very minimal. However, the segmentation observed in the PNS follows from the selectively expressed molecules such as T-cadherin, 48 and 55 K peanut lectin (PNA) binding proteins and proteoglycans such as collagen IX, versican, and a proteoglycan that binds cytotactin in the posterior sclerotome of the somites. These molecules exert their strong influence on the segmentation pattern by restricting the outgrowth from the region. As a matter of fact, these inhibitory chemicals expressed in the posterior sclerotome forms the basis of the segmentation pattern observed in the vertebrate nervous system. In short, the segmental arrangement of the peripheral nervous system (PNS) seen in vertebrates derives from the division of the sclerotomes into anterior and posterior parts.
