= Sectional =

Sectional or Sectionals may refer to:

- Sectionals, or sectional rehearsals, rehearsals for a single orchestral section
- Sectional, or sectional couch, an item of furniture
- "Sectionals" (Glee), a 2009 episode of the TV series Glee

== See also ==
- Sectionalism, loyalty to the interests of one's own region rather than the country as a whole
- Sectional chart, an aeronautical chart used for VFR navigation
