= Compartmentalization =

Compartmentalization or compartmentalisation may refer to:

- Compartmentalization (biology)
- Compartmentalization (engineering)
- Compartmentalization (fire protection)
- Compartmentalization (information security)
- Compartmentalization (psychology)
- Compartmentalization of decay in trees
