= Parting.com =

American online funeral home directory

Parting
- Type: Private
- Industry: Death care
- Founded: 2015; 11 years ago
- Founder: Tyler Yamasaki
- Headquarters: Los Angeles, California, U.S.
- Area served: United States
- Key people: Tyler Yamasaki (CEO)
- Products: Parting.com (funeral home directory); Parting Pro (funeral arrangement software)
- Website: www.parting.com

Parting is an American online directory and comparison service for funeral homes, listing more than 15,000 providers across the United States together with their prices, photographs and reviews. The company was founded in 2015 and is based in Los Angeles, California.

== History ==
Parting was founded in 2015 by Tyler Yamasaki, who has said the concept grew out of difficulties he experienced while helping to arrange his grandmother's funeral. Initially, the service compiled funeral pricing in part by having staff contact funeral homes as prospective customers to obtain their price lists, while also allowing funeral homes to submit and maintain their own listings. The company later developed Parting Pro, software that allows funeral homes to arrange and sell cremation services to families online.
