= Division Street =

Division Street may refer to:

== Streets ==
- Division Street (Chicago)
- Division Street (Manhattan)
- Division Street (Spokane, Washington)

== Places ==
- Division Street, Sheffield, England

== See also ==
- Division Street Bridge (Rhode Island)
- Division Street Bridge (Spokane, Washington)
