= Parts (surname) =

Family name

Origin
- Region of origin: Estonia

Parts is an Estonian surname, and may refer to:

- Juhan Parts (born 1966), Estonian politician
- Kaarel Parts (1873–1940), Estonian lawyer and politician
- Merle Parts (born 1967), Estonian judge
- Karl Parts (1886–1941), Estonian military officer
