= 1970–1979 world oil market chronology =

For further details see the "Energy crisis" series by Facts on File.

== 1970 ==
- January 1: U.S. Federal oil depletion allowance reduced from 27.5 to 22.0 percent.
- May 3: TAP line from Saudi Arabia to the Mediterranean interrupted in Syria, creating all-time tanker rate highs from June to December.
- September 4: - October 9 Libya raises posted prices and increases tax rate from 50 percent to 55 percent. Iran and Kuwait follow in November.
- December 9: OPEC meeting in Caracas establishes 55 percent as minimum tax rate and demands that posted prices be changed to reflect changes in foreign exchange rates.

== 1971 ==
- January 12: Negotiations begin in Tehran between 6 Gulf producing countries and 22 oil companies.
- February 3: OPEC mandates " a complete and total embargo " against any company that rejects the 55 percent tax rate.
- February 14: Tehran agreement signed. Companies accept 55 percent tax rate, immediate increase in posted prices, and further successive increases.
- February 24: Algeria nationalizes 51 percent of French oil concessions.
- April 2: Libya concludes five weeks of negotiations with Western oil companies in Tripoli on behalf of itself, Saudi Arabia, Algeria and Iraq. Agreement raises posted prices of oil delivered to Mediterranean from $2.55 to $3.45 per barrel; provides for a 2.5 percent annual price increase plus inflation allowance; raises tax rate from a range of 50-58 percent to 60 percent of posted price.
- July 31: Venezuela's Hydrocarbons Reversion Law mandates gradual transfer to government ownership of all "unexploited concession areas" by 1974 and "all their residual assets" by 1983.
- August 15: U.S. Government institutes Phase I price controls. Invoking the powers granted to the president by the Economic Stabilization Act of 1970, President Richard Nixon orders 90-day nationwide freeze on all wages, prices, salaries and rents.
- September 22: OPEC directs members to negotiate price increases to offset the devaluation of the U.S. dollar.
- November: U.S. Phase II price controls begin. Plan is to allow for gradual 2-3 percent annual price increases, however, domestic petroleum prices remain at Phase I levels.
- December 5: Libya nationalizes British Petroleum concession.

== 1972 ==
- January 20: Six exporting countries - Abu Dhabi, Iran, Iraq, Kuwait, Qatar and Saudi Arabia - conclude ten days of meetings with Western oil companies. An agreement is reached to raise the posted price of crude by 8.49 percent to offset the loss in value of oil concessions attributable to the decline in value of the U.S. dollar.
- March 11: OPEC threatens "appropriate sanctions" against companies that "fail to comply with . . . any action taken by a Member Country in accordance with [OPEC] decisions."
- June 1: Iraq nationalizes Iraq Petroleum Company's (IPC) concession owned by British Petroleum, Royal Dutch-Shell, Compagnie Francaise des Petroles, Mobil and Standard Oil of New Jersey (now Exxon). The concessions were valued at over one billion dollars.
- June 9: In a show of support for Iraq, OPEC moves to prevent companies whose interests were nationalized in Iraq from increasing production elsewhere; appoints mediators between Iraq and IPC.
- September 30: Libya acquires a 50 percent interest in two ENI concessions.
- October 27: OPEC approves plan providing for 25 percent government ownership of all Western oil interests operating within Kuwait, Qatar, Abu Dhabi and Saudi Arabia beginning on January 1, 1973, and rising to 51 percent by January 1, 1983. (Iraq declines to agree.) Agreements signed on December 21.

== 1973 ==
- January 11: U.S. Phase III price controls begin. Allows for voluntary instead of mandatory price control on all U.S. prices. This does not prevent a sharp rise in heating oil prices caused by a severe winter and shortage of product.
- January 17: President Nixon suspends mandatory oil import quota on No. 2 heating oil through April 30.
- January 23: Shah of Iran announces that the 1954 operating agreement between a consortium of oil companies and Iran will not be renewed when it expires in 1979. The consortium was formed in 1954 as a means to settle a dispute between a new ministry in Iran and the Anglo-Iranian Oil Company (AIOC). The consortium included Standard Oil of New Jersey, Standard Oil of California, SOCONY-Vacuum, the Texas Company, Gulf, Royal Dutch-Shell, the Compagnie Francaise de Petroles, and the AIOC.
- February 28: Iraq and IPC reach an agreement on compensation for nationalization.
- March :Special Rule No. 1 reimposes mandatory (Phase II) price controls on the 23 largest oil companies. Smaller companies, representing 5 percent of the market, enjoy uncontrolled prices.
- March 16: Shah of Iran and Consortium members agree to nationalize all assets immediately in return for an assured 20-year supply of Iranian oil.
- March 16: OPEC discusses raising prices to offset decline of U.S. dollar value.
- April 1: OPEC increases posted prices by 5.7 percent.
- April 18: U.S. Government ends Mandatory Oil Import Program. Program, established in 1959 by President Eisenhower, had limited imports of crude and product east of the Rocky Mountains to a percentage of domestic crude production.
- June 1: Eight OPEC countries raise posted prices by 11.9 percent.
- June 11: Libya nationalizes Bunker Hunt concession; Nigeria acquires 35 percent participation in Shell-BP concession.
- June 14: Nixon administration imposes 60-day economy-wide price freeze, superseding Special Rule No. 1 for oil companies.
- Aug :Libya nationalizes 51 percent of Occidental Petroleum concession and of the Oasis consortium.
- Aug 17: President Nixon's Cost of Living Council imposes two-tier price ceiling on crude petroleum sales: production of "old" oil (that produced at or below 1972 levels from existing wells) to be sold at March 1973 prices plus 35 cents; production of "new" oil (that produced above 1972 levels from existing wells and oil produced from new wells) to be sold at uncontrolled prices.
- September 1: Libya nationalizes 51 percent of nine other companies' concessions: Esso, Libya/Sirte, Mobil, Shell, Gelensberg, Texaco, SoCal, Libyan-American (ARCO), and Grace.
- September 5: Conference of less developed countries approves forming "producers' associations," calls for withdrawal of Israeli forces from occupied Arab lands.
- September 15: OPEC supports price hikes and designates six Persian Gulf countries to negotiate collectively with companies over prices. Other members to negotiate individually.
- September : Kuwait rejects gradual participation increase plan, insists on immediate 60 percent participation.
- October 6: Beginning of fourth Arab-Israeli War.
- October 7: Iraq nationalizes Exxon and Mobil shares in Basrah Petroleum Company representing 23.75 percent equity in the company.
- October 8: OPEC meets with oil companies to discuss revision of 1971 Tehran agreement and oil prices. Negotiations fail.
- October 16: The Gulf Six (Iran, Iraq, Abu Dhabi, Kuwait, Saudi Arabia and Qatar) unilaterally raise the posted price of Saudi Light marker crude 17 percent from $3.12 to $3.65 per barrel and announce production cuts.
- October 17: OPEC oil ministers agree to use oil weapon in Arab-Israeli War, mandate cut in exports, and recommend embargo against unfriendly states.
- October 19: Saudi Arabia, Libya, and other Arab states proclaim an embargo on oil exports to the United States.
- October 23: Arab oil embargo extended to the Netherlands.
- November 5: Arab producers announce 25 percent cut in production below September levels. Further cuts of five percent are threatened.
- November 18: Arab oil ministers cancel the scheduled 5 percent cut in production for EEC.
- November 23: Arab summit conference adopts open and secret resolutions on the use of the oil weapon. Embargo extended to Portugal, Rhodesia, and South Africa.
- November 27: President Nixon signs the Emergency Petroleum Allocation Act (EPAA). Authorizes petroleum price, production, allocation and marketing controls.
- December 9: Arab oil ministers announce a further production cut of 5 percent for January for non-friendly countries.
- December 22: OPEC Gulf Six decides to raise the posted price of marker crude from $5.12 to $11.65 per barrel effective January 1, 1974.
- December 25: Arab oil ministers cancel January 5 percent production cut. Saudi Arabian oil minister promises 10 percent OPEC production rise.

== 1974 ==
- January 7–9: OPEC decides to freeze posted prices until April 1.
- January 29: Kuwait announces 60 percent government participation in BP-Gulf concession; Qatar follows on February 20.
- February 11: Washington Energy Conference opens. Attended by 13 industrial and oil producing nations. Called by U.S. to resolve the international energy problems through economic cooperation among nations. Henry Kissinger unveils Nixon Administration's seven-point "Project Independence" plan to make the U.S. energy independent. Libya nationalizes three U.S. oil companies that had not agreed to 51 percent nationalization in September.
- February 12–14: Heads of state of Algeria, Egypt, Syria, and Saudi Arabia discuss oil strategy in view of the progress in Arab-Israeli disengagement.
- March 18: Arab oil ministers announce the end of the embargo against the United States, all except Libya.
- May 18: Nigeria announces 55 percent government participation in all concessions.
- June 1–3: Arab oil ministers decide to end most restrictions on exports of oil to the United States but continue embargo against the Netherlands, Portugal, South Africa, and Rhodesia.
- June 4: Saudi Arabia announces that it will increase its participation in Aramco to 60 percent. Abu Dhabi and Kuwait follow in September. Increases are retroactive to January 1.
- June 13: IMF establishes its "oil facility," a special fund for loans to nations whose balance of payments have been severely affected by high oil prices.
- Jul 10-11: OAPEC lifts the embargo against the Netherlands.
- September 6: Saudi Arabia increases its buy-back price from 93 percent to 94.9 percent of posted price.
- September 13: OPEC instructs its Secretary General to "carry out a study of supply and demand in relation to possible production controls."
- Oct-November: Saudi Arabians raise tax rate to 85 percent and royalty rate to 20 percent.
- November 15: International Energy Agency formed in Paris within OECD framework. Saudi Arabia, Qatar, and United Arab Emirates announce a slight reduction in posted prices and tax rates.
- December U.S. Crude Oil Entitlements Program enacted, retroactive to November 1974.
- December 22: Iraq announces plans to increase its production capacity to 3.5 Mbbl/d (560,000 m^{3}/d) by 1975 and to 6 Mbbl/d (950,000 m^{3}/d) by 1981.

== 1975 ==
- January 1: U.S. Federal oil depletion allowance eliminated for large producers.
- January 13: Business Week publishes Kissinger interview hinting at military action against oil countries in case of "actual strangulation."
- April 7–15: Preliminary meeting at Paris on world economic crisis between oil-exporting (Algeria, Saudi Arabia, Iran, Venezuela), oil-importing (European countries, U.S., Japan), and non-oil Third World countries (India, Brazil, Zaire). Talks collapse after nations fail to decide whether agenda should focus on oil/energy issues or have a broader economic scope.
- April 9: Twenty-four OECD members sign an agreement to establish a $25 billion lending facility to provide assistance to industrial nations hurt by high oil prices.
- June 13: World Bank establishes its "Third Window," a fund to make loans to countries too rich to qualify for "soft" no-interest loans, but too distressed to afford loans at the prevailing normal lending rates. Action represents significant cooperation between oil-exporting and industrial nations.
- September 24: OPEC announces a 15 percent increase in government per barrel revenues as of October 1.
- October 28: Venezuela and foreign oil companies agree on nationalization as of January 1, 1976.
- December 1: Kuwait and Gulf and BP agree on terms of nationalization.
- December 9: Iraq completes nationalization by taking over the BP, CFP, and Shell shares of the Basrah Petroleum Company.
- December 22: President Ford signs the Energy Policy and Conservation Act (EPCA) effective February 1976. Authorizes the establishment of the Strategic Petroleum Reserve (SPR), participation in International Energy Program, and oil price regulation.

== 1976 ==
- February: EPCA 3-tier price regulation begins. Small changes in Entitlements Program.
- April - May: Lebanese civil war causes a drop in Iraq exports through trans-Lebanon pipelines to the Mediterranean.
- May: OPEC issues press release vowing to "take appropriate measures" to protect OPEC interests in light of protectionist actions by certain countries.
- September 1: U.S. stripper well oil prices decontrolled.
- December 14: 640-foot (200 m) oil tanker Argo Merchant runs aground on the Nantucket Shoals, spilling 7.6 million US gallons (29,000 m^{3}) of No. 6 fuel oil.
- December: Moderates and OPEC "hawks" disagree on how fast oil prices should rise. Saudi Arabia and United Arab Emirates increase prices by 5 percent, others by 10 percent.

== 1977 ==
- January: OPEC goes to two-tier pricing (Saudi Arabia and United Arab Emirates use $12.09 per barrel and other OPEC countries use $12.70per barrel).
- May: Fifty percent of Saudi Arabia's 10 Mbbl/d (1,600,000 m^{3}/d) production is halted briefly due to fire damage to separation facility in Abqaiq field. Prices increase slightly.
- July: OPEC prices reunified at $12.70 per barrel as Saudi Arabia and UAE fall into line, then official price rises to $13.66 per barrel.
- October 23: Dry dock complex opens at Bahrain; only facility between Portugal and Singapore capable of servicing VLCCs.

== 1978 ==
- January: Student protests against government of Reza Pahlavi, Shah of Iran, begin, touching off a wave of political unrest and violent clashes between police and demonstrators. Throughout the year increasing anti-Shah activities are led by Muslim fundamentalists seeking to establish a Muslim state.
- March: Amoco Cadiz tanker runs aground off the coast of France, spilling 1.6 million barrels (250,000 m^{3}) of crude oil. (Largest crude spill to date.)
- June Iran and Saudi Arabia block efforts of OPEC price hawks to fix the price of OPEC oil in a currency more stable than the U.S. dollar. Say world economy cannot support associated price increases. Are accused by hawks of being U.S. agents.
- September: Shah puts Iran under military rule. Muslim leader Noori arrested in crackdown of opposition groups.
- October: Iranian strikes; departure of foreign technicians. Pipeline fire drops Iraqi production from 600,000 barrels per day (95,000 m^{3}/d) to 300,000 barrels per day (48,000 m^{3}/d).
- November: Iranian oil production starts dropping.
- December: Iranian production hits 1.5 Mbbl/d (240,000 m^{3}/d) in mid-December; 500,000 on December 27, a 27-year low. OPEC production rises 1.6 MMBD over two months due to increased Saudi production.
- December 17: OPEC decides on a 14.5 percent price increase for 1979, to be implemented quarterly.

== 1979 ==
- January: First emergency Crude Oil Buy-Sell Program allocations.
- January 16: Shah leaves Iran on vacation, never to return. Bakhtiar government established by the Shah to preside until unrest subsides.
- January 20: Saudi Arabia announces drastic cut in first-quarter production. 9.5 MMBD ceiling imposed. Although actual cuts never reach announced levels, spot prices of Middle East light crudes rise 36 percent.
- January 20: 1 million Iranians march in Teheran in a show of support for the exiled Ayatollah Khomeini, fundamental Muslim leader.
- February 12: Bakhtiar resigns as prime minister of Iran after losing support of the military.
- March 5: Iran resumes petroleum exports.
- Spring: Gasoline shortage/world oil glut.
- March 26: OPEC makes full 14.5 percent price increase for 1979 effective on April 1. Marker crude raised to $14.56 per barrel.
- May: DOE announces $5 per barrel entitlement to importers of heating oil. Saudi Arabia announces intention to increase direct sales and to sell less through Aramco. Both announcements send prices higher.
- June 1: Phased oil price decontrol begins. Involves gradual 28 month increase of "old" oil price ceilings, and slower rate of increase of "new" oil price ceilings.
- June 26–28: OPEC raises prices average of 15 percent, effective July 1.
- Oct: Buy-Sell Program sales average more than 400,000 bbl/d (64,000 m^{3}/d) from October 1979 through March 1980 - highest level since February 1976, due to emergency allocations.
- Oct: Canada eliminates light crude oil exports to U.S. refiners, except for those exports required by operational constraints of pipelines.
- November 4: Iran takes western hostages.
- November 12: Carter orders cessation of Iranian imports to U.S.
- November 15: Iran cancels all contracts with U.S. oil companies.
- December 13: : Saudi Arabia raises marker crude price to $24 per barrel.

== See also ==
- 1970s energy crisis
- 1980–1989 world oil market chronology
- 1990–1999 world oil market chronology
- Mexican oil boom (1977 - 1981)
