= Part (surname) =

Part is a surname and may refer to:

- Brian Part (born 1962), American child actor
- Dealtry Charles Part (1882–1961), sheriff (1926–1927) and Lord Lieutenant (1943–1957) of Bedfordshire, racehorse owner
- Dionysius Part (also known as Denys Part; died 1475), Roman Catholic prelate, Auxiliary Bishop of Mainz (1474–1475)
- John Part (born 1966), Canadian darts player
- Veronika Part (born 1978), Russian ballet dancer

== See also ==
- Armi Pärt (born 1991), Estonian handballer
- Arvo Pärt (born 1935), Estonian classical composer
- Michael Pärt (born 1977), Estonian music producer and film composer
- Pärt Uusberg (born 1986), Estonian composer and conductor
