= DiscoverCars.com =

Company based in Riga, Latvia

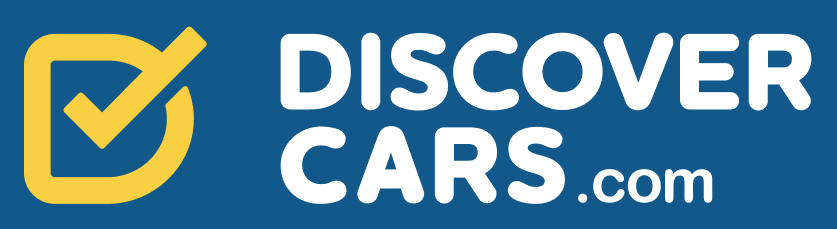
- Screenshot
- Website type: Privately Held Company
- Founded: July 16, 2013; 13 years ago in Riga, Latvia
- Headquarters: Riga, Latvia
- Area served: Worldwide
- Industry: Car rental
- Services: Online car rental reservation
- Employees: 95 (2021)
- Website: discovercars.com

DiscoverCars.com (known as Discover Car Hire until 2019) is an international car rental broker that provides rental car bookings. The company was founded in 2013 in Latvia. The main headquarters of DiscoverCars.com is located in Riga, Latvia.

== Services ==
Its website is available in 17 languages. As of early 2020, DiscoverCars.com works with more than 8,000 car rental locations in 137 countries. The company works with car rental providers around the world, such as Hertz, Alamo, Europcar, National, and SIXT, as well as travel metasearch engines such as Kayak.com, Skyscanner, Jetcost, and Liligo.

== Growth ==
Founded in 2013 as Discover Car Hire with a focus on European destinations, the company re-branded as DiscoverCars.com in 2019.

In March 2020, DiscoverCars.com was included in the FT 1000, an annual ranking published by the Financial Times that lists the fastest-growing companies in Europe. DiscoverCars.com was ranked 64th, thus becoming the highest-ranked Latvian company in the history of the list. DiscoverCars.com was also the third-fastest growing travel & leisure company and the fastest-growing car rental company in Europe. In March 2021, it was included in the 2021 version of the rankings.

In March 2020, like many other travel companies, DiscoverCars.com experienced a significant decrease in reservations due to the COVID-19 global pandemic. At the same time, the company registered an increase in local tourism in certain countries.

== Technology ==
DiscoverCars.com uses AMP technology. This has led to more reservations, a higher marketing conversion rate, and other improvements in the KPIs of the company.

== Market research ==
In addition to car rental services, DiscoverCars.com studies their customers' car rental habits. In September 2019, the company's customers were surveyed on the most scenic destinations for traveling by car, naming Gran Canaria in Spain; İzmir, Turkey; Cairns Australia; Kefalonia, Greece; and Split, Croatia as the most scenic.

In May 2019, the company published research on how drunk-driving limits and punishments differ between countries. In the June 2020, they published insights into the effects of the COVID-19 pandemic on car rental prices and the safety measures taken by rental companies.

== Recognitions ==
- World's Leading Car Rental Booking Website, World Travel Awards, 2020
- World's Leading Car Rental App Nominee, World Travel Awards, 2020
- Silver Award Winner, Travel Weekly Magellan Awards, 2020
- FT 1000: Europe's Fastest Growing Companies, Financial Times, 2020 and 2021
- Inc. 5000 Europe, Inc. Magazine, 2019
