= Piece =

Piece or Pieces (not to be confused with peace) may refer to:

== Arts, entertainment, and media ==
=== Games ===
- Piece (chess), pieces deployed on a chessboard for playing the game of chess
- Pieces (video game), a 1994 puzzle game for the Super NES
- Pieces, parts of a jigsaw puzzle or board game

=== Music ===
==== Albums ====
- Piece (Lena Park album), 1998
- Piece (Monsta X album), 2018
- Pieces (Bobby Womack album), 1978
- Pieces (Erik Hassle album), 2010
- Pieces (IU album), 2021
- Pieces (Manassas album), 2009
- Pieces (Matt Simons album) or the title song, 2012
- Pieces (Michele Stodart album), 2016
- Pieces, Part One, by Epik High, 2008
- Pieces, by Daeg Faerch, 2020
- Pieces, by Kokia, 2011
- Pieces, an EP by Dismember, 1992

==== Songs ====
- "Piece" (song), by Yui Aragaki, 2009
- "Pieces" (Chase & Status song), 2008
- "Pieces" (Daughtry song), 2024
- "Pieces" (Gary Allan song), 2013
- "Pieces" (L'Arc-en-Ciel song), 1999
- "Pieces" (Sum 41 song), 2005
- "Hide"/"Pieces", by Red, 2007
- "Pieces", by All Saints from Red Flag
- "Pieces", by Anthrax from Volume 8: The Threat Is Real
- "Pieces", by Dark New Day from Twelve Year Silence
- "Pieces", by Ella Mai from Heart on My Sleeve
- "Pieces", by Fool's Garden from Dish of the Day
- "Pieces", by Hoobastank from Hoobastank
- "Pieces", by Matoma from One in a Million
- "Pieces", by Motor Ace from Shoot This
- "Pieces", by Psapp from Tourists
- "Pieces", by Rascal Flatts from Me and My Gang
- "Pieces", by Rob Thomas from The Great Unknown
- "Pieces", by Sevendust from Next
- "Pieces", by Stone Sour from Audio Secrecy
- "Pieces", by the Stylistics from Round 2
- "Pieces", by Tory Lanez from Memories Don't Die

==== Other uses in music ====
- Pieces, a band consisting of Buckethead and Bryan "Brain" Mantia
- Musical piece, a composition or a single performance or recording
- Piano piece, a musical piece written for piano
- Membership of an ensemble, so 4-piece band (Quartet)

=== Other uses in arts, entertainment, and media ===
- Piece, in journalism, the print or digital coverage of a news story
- Piece (graffiti), a style of graffiti with large and complex letter forms
- "Piece" (short story) by Iain Banks, 1989
- Pieces (art installation), a diptych by the British artist and sculptor Baldrick Buckle
- Pieces (film), a cult horror film from 1982
- Pieces (2022 film), an Australian film nominated for the 2022 AACTA Award for Best Indie Film

== Places ==
- Piece, Cornwall, a village in Cornwall, England
- Piece, Silesian Voivodeship, a village in southern Poland
- Piece, Pomeranian Voivodeship, a village in Pomeranian Voivodeship, northern Poland
- Piece, Warmian-Masurian Voivodeship, a village in Warmian-Masurian Voivodeship, northern Poland

== See also ==
- Coin
- Piece by Piece (disambiguation)
- Piece of Cake (disambiguation)
- Pieces of Dreams (disambiguation)
- Game piece (disambiguation)
- Mouthpiece (disambiguation)
- Part (disambiguation)
- Portion (disambiguation)
- Section (disambiguation)
- Segment (disambiguation)
- Strip (disambiguation)
- Unit (disambiguation)
- Pea (disambiguation), including peas
- Peace (disambiguation)
- Pease (disambiguation)
