= Portion =

Portion may refer to:

- Dominant portion, in real estate appraising
- Marriage portion, another term for dowry.
- Serving size, the typical amount of a certain food eaten (or recommended for eating) at one seating

== See also ==
- Cavernous portion (disambiguation), in physiology
- Petrous portion (disambiguation), in physiology
- Portion control (disambiguation)

=== Related concepts ===
- Fragment (disambiguation)
- Part (disambiguation)
- Piece (disambiguation)
- Segment (disambiguation)
- Slice (disambiguation)
