= Łuków (disambiguation) =

Łuków may refer to the following places:

- Łuków in Lublin Voivodeship (east Poland)
- Łuków, Lubusz Voivodeship (west Poland)
- Łuków, Silesian Voivodeship (south Poland)
- Lukiv (Łuków), Polish name for the municipality in Ukraine
- Luckau (Łuków}, Sorbian name for the municipality in Germany
