= Sumina, Silesian Voivodeship =

Sumina
- Village
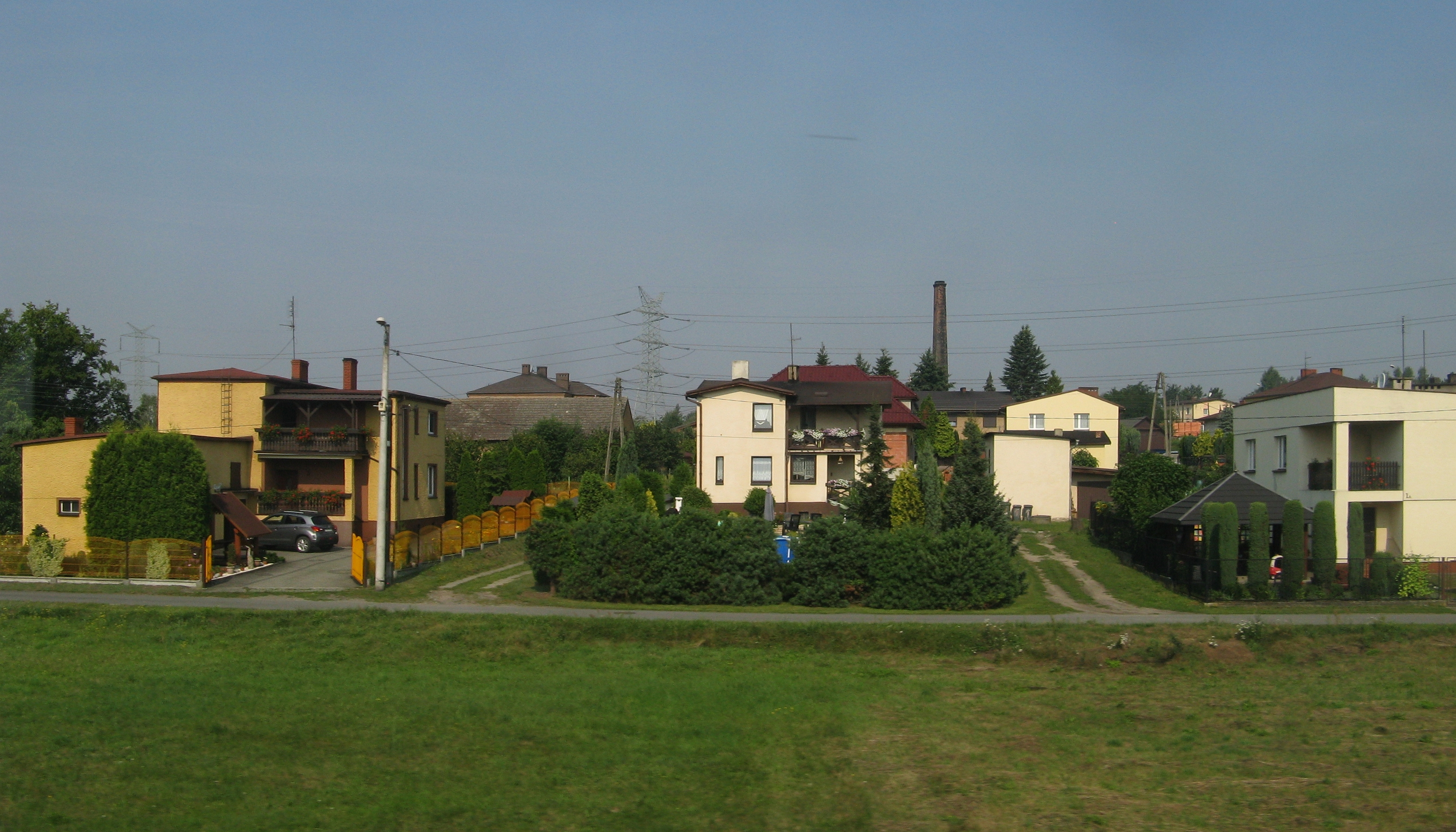

- Location within Poland
- Coordinates: 50°7′N 18°25′E
- Country: Poland
- Voivodeship: Silesian
- County: Rybnik
- Gmina: Lyski

Sumina [suˈmina] is a village in the administrative district of Gmina Lyski, within Rybnik County, Silesian Voivodeship, in southern Poland.
