= Bogunice =

- Village
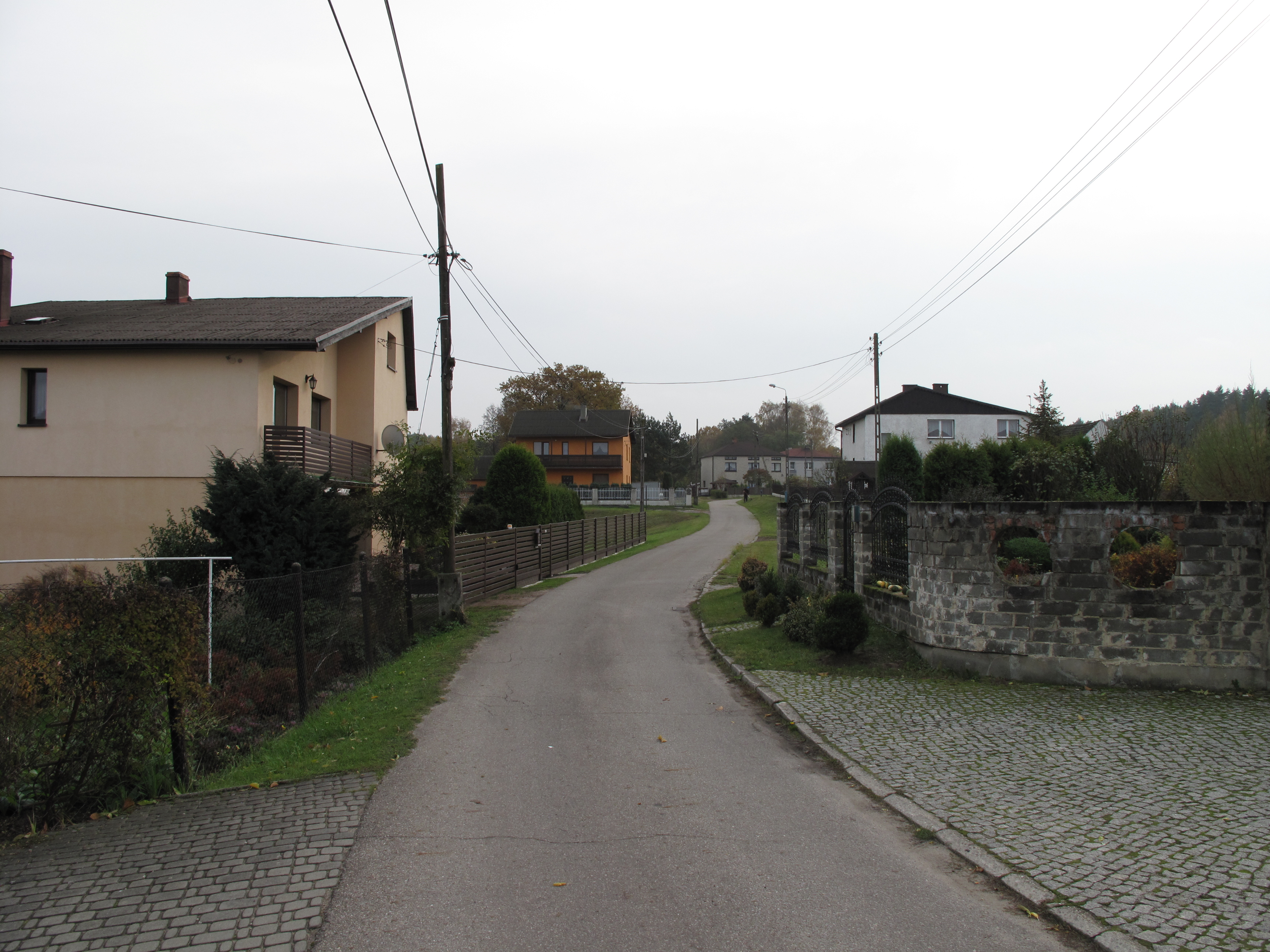
- Houses

- Location within Poland
- Coordinates: 50°8′N 18°22′E
- Country: Poland
- Voivodeship: Silesian
- County: Rybnik
- Gmina: Lyski

Bogunice [bɔɡuˈnit͡sɛ] is a village in the administrative district of Gmina Lyski, within Rybnik County, Silesian Voivodeship, in southern Poland. It lies approximately 15 km (9 mi) north-west of Rybnik and 47 km (29 mi) west of the regional capital Katowice.

== Gallery ==
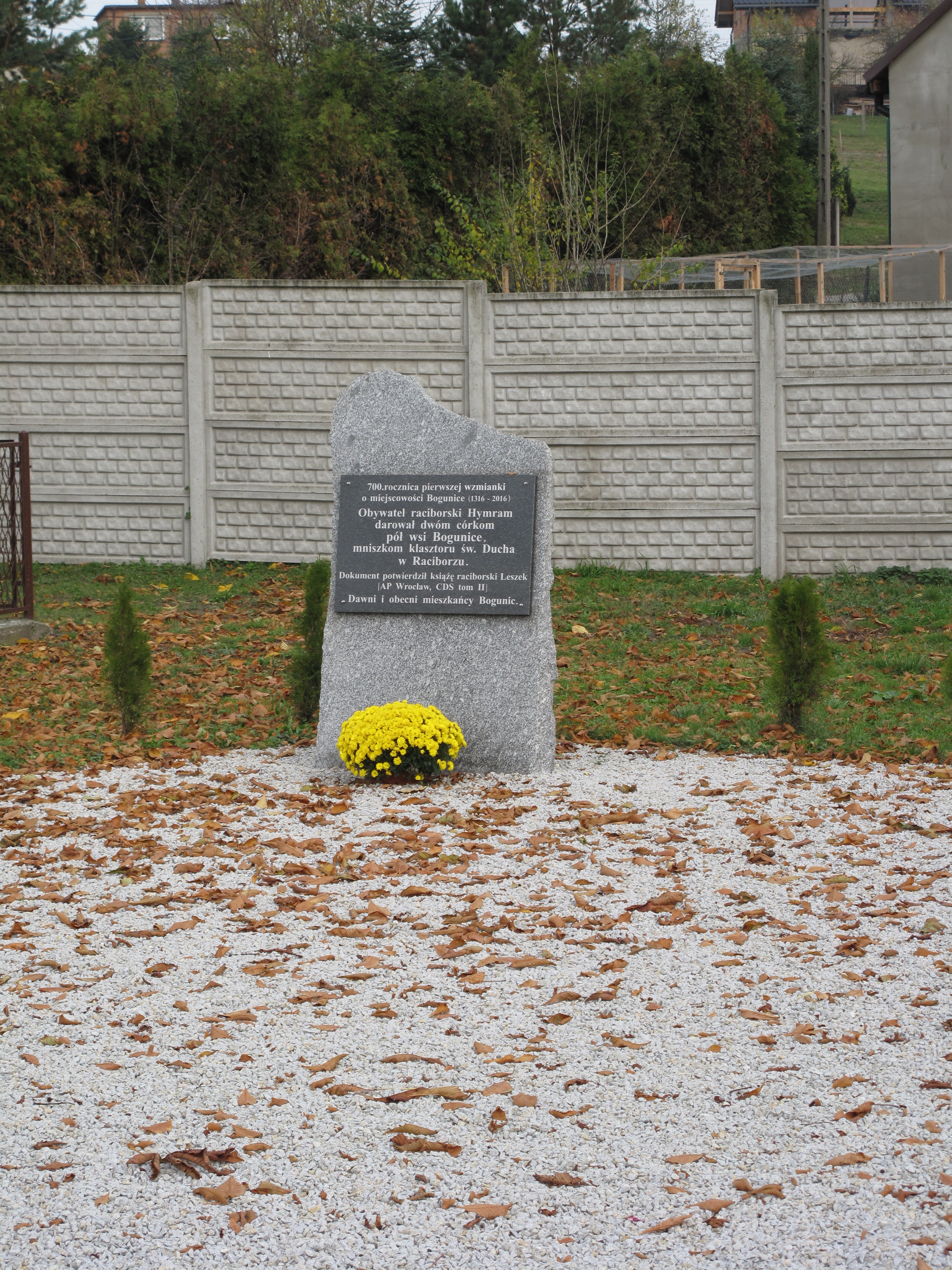
Memorial

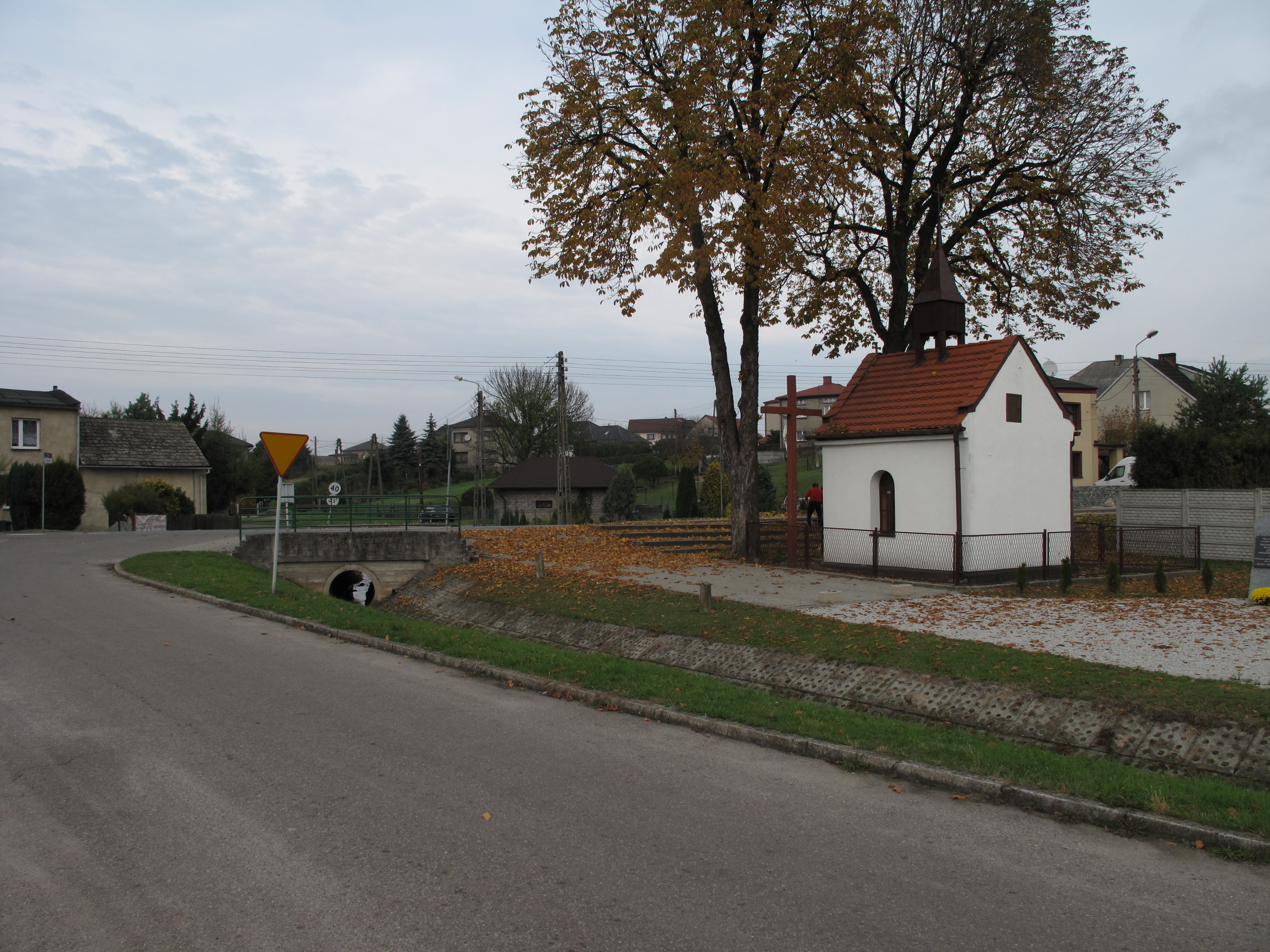
Village chapel

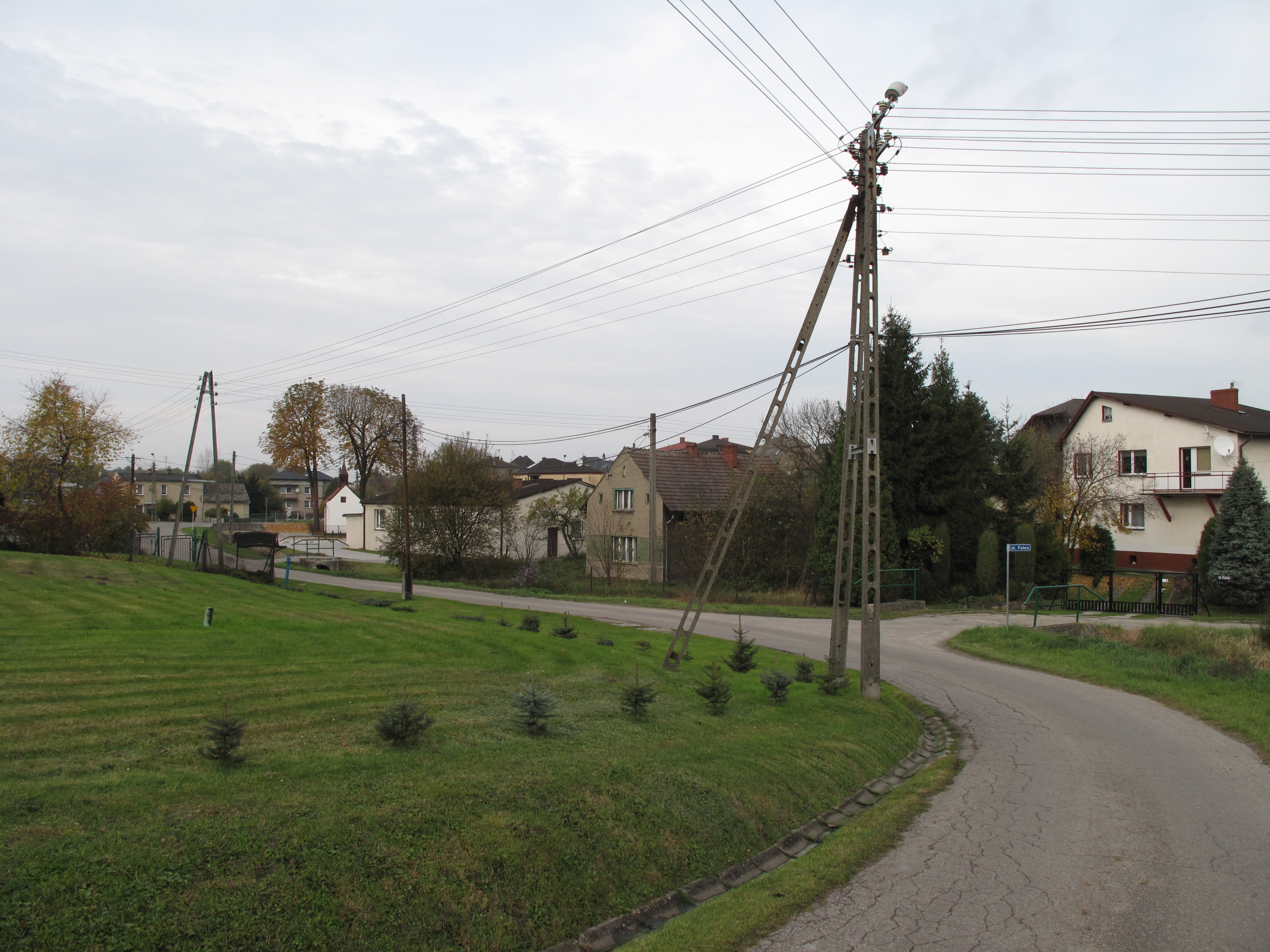
Houses
