= Flight 345 =

Flight 345 may refer to:

Listed chronologically

- Philippine Air Lines Flight 345, crashed on 28 February 1967
- Turkish Airlines Flight 345, crashed on 30 January 1975
- Southwest Airlines Flight 345, accident on 22 July 2013
