= Piece of Cake =

A piece of cake is a part of the sweetened flour-based whole post baked food type: cake; that may be either a broken-off irregular shaped part of, a part made by utilization of a utensil: a fork or spoon, specifically and usually though refers to a part made by using a knife to make a slice.

Piece of Cake or A Piece of Cake may also refer to:

== Literature ==
- Piece of Cake (novel), a 1983 novel by Derek Robinson
- "A Piece of Cake", a 1942 short story by Roald Dahl
- A Piece of Cake: A Memoir, an autobiography by Cupcake Brown

== Music ==
- A Piece of Cake (EP), a 1996 EP by Cake
- Piece of Cake (album), the 3rd album by Seattle band Mudhoney
- Piece of Cake, an album by the band Vengeance
- "Piece of Cake", a song by Jethro Tull from their album Nightcap
- "Piece of Cake", a song by Roxette

== Other uses ==
- A Piece of Cake (film), a 1948 British comedy fantasy film
- Piece of Cake (manga), a manga and film
- "Piece of Cake" (Rugrats episode), seventh series episode of the American animated series Rugrats
- Piece of Cake (TV series), a British mini series based on the novel;
- Piece of Cake: Slang for a sure thing

== See also ==
- Slam dunk (disambiguation)
