= The Magic Numbers =

British alternative rock band

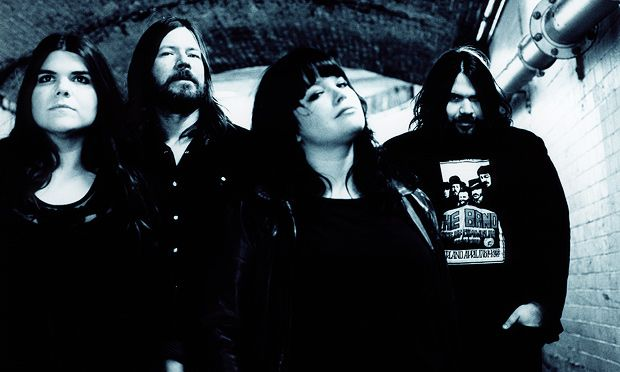

Background information
- Origin: Ealing, London, England
- Genres: Alternative rock, indie rock
- Years active: 2002–present
- Labels: Capitol Records/EMI, Heavenly, Caroline International, Role Play Records
- Members: Angela Gannon; Sean Gannon; Michele Stodart; Romeo Stodart

The Magic Numbers are an English alternative rock band consisting of two brother-and-sister pairs, from Hanwell in west London. The group was formed in 2002, releasing their debut album titled The Magic Numbers on 13 June 2005. Their follow-up album, Those the Brokes, was released on 6 November 2006; The Runaway was released on 6 June 2010, Alias was released on 18 August 2014, and their most recent album, Outsiders, was released on 11 May 2018.

The Magic Numbers consists of Romeo Stodart (lead guitar, vocals), his sister Michele Stodart (bass guitar, vocals, glockenspiel), Angela Gannon (melodica, percussion, keyboard, vocals) and her brother Sean Gannon (drums).

== History ==
=== Backgrounds ===
The Stodarts are the children of a Scottish father and a Portuguese mother and were born in Trinidad in the Caribbean, where their mother was an opera singer and had her own TV show. When the family fled an Islamic coup attempt there in 1990, they were raised in New York City. In the mid-1990s, when Romeo was 17 and Michele was 13, they moved to London.

The Gannons are of Irish descent but lived in Hanwell, London where they became friends with their neighbours the Stodarts. Prior to forming the Magic Numbers, Romeo and Sean spent time trying to form a band together under various guises, and previously performed under the name 'Guess'.

=== Early years ===
In late 2002 The Magic Numbers formed in their present guise, and they began touring the London circuit, gradually developing their sound and building a small cult following, not least amongst some already established artists including The Chemical Brothers, Travis, and Ed Harcourt, with the latter later influential in their signing to record label Heavenly Records, narrowly choosing that label over Rough Trade Records.

Their rise came swiftly, beginning in the summer of 2004 and later that year when they began supporting well-known artists such as Travis, Ed Harcourt and Snow Patrol and appearing on the bill of some low-key UK festivals, building a larger following by increasing their live performances. In November 2004, they released a limited edition 7" vinyl single, "Hymn for Her", to coincide with a three-show residency at The Borderline in London.

=== The Magic Numbers ===
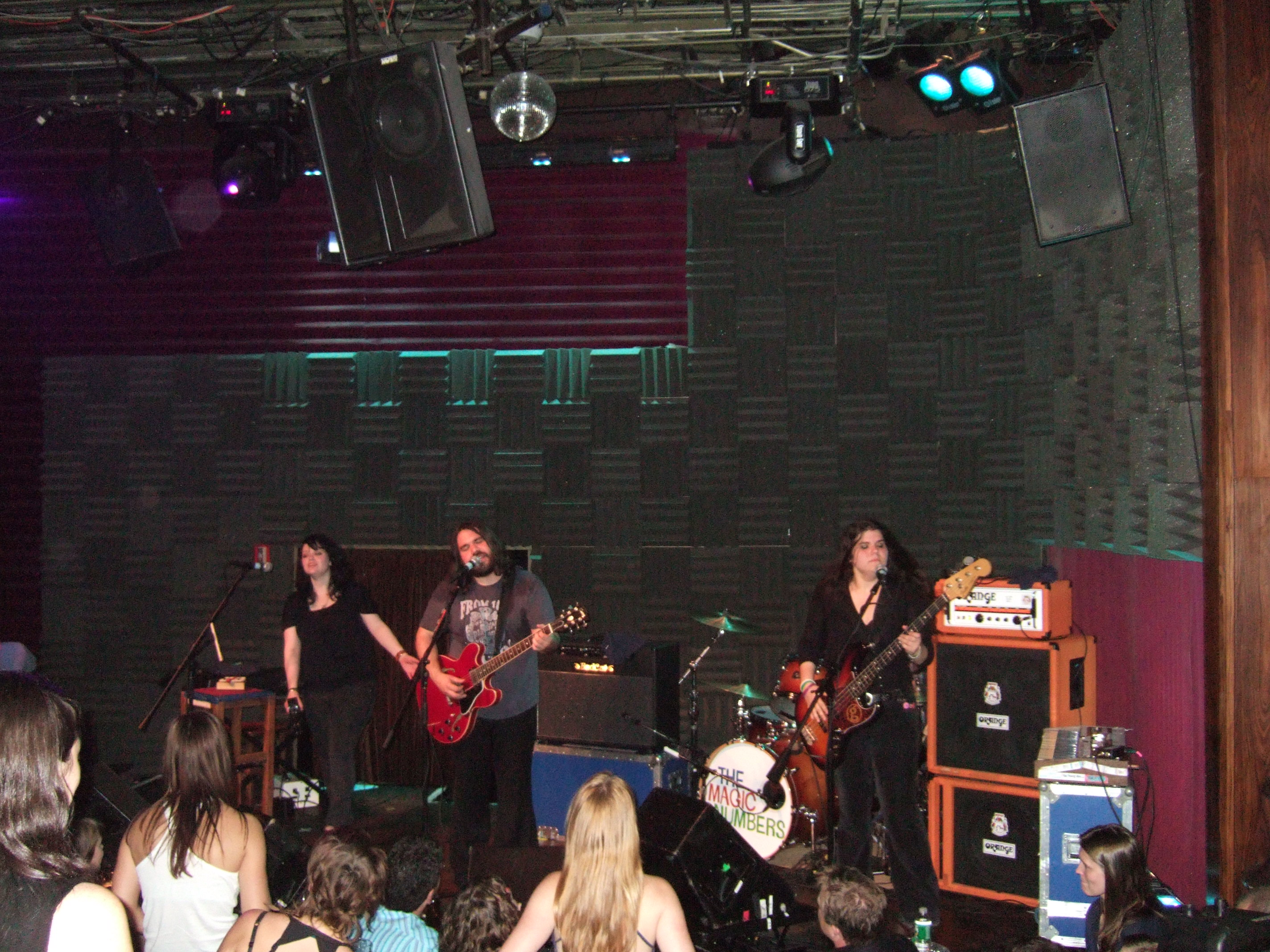
The Magic Numbers in 2006, left to right: Angela Gannon, Romeo Stodart, Michele Stodart (not pictured: Sean Gannon behind drum kit.)

On the back of releasing just one commercially available single, "Forever Lost", and even before their debut album was released, they played a sold-out show to a crowd of over 2,000 at The Forum in Kentish Town, London, where a limited number of live albums of the gig were released. They played their first live session on UK radio on the Dermot O'Leary Show for BBC Radio 2.

Their eponymous debut album was recorded in late 2004 and early 2005 at Metropolis Studios in London, and released on 13 June 2005. The album was produced and recorded by American producer Craig Silvey. Prior to release, only "Forever Lost" was promoted as a commercial single. This was followed up by later single releases "Love Me Like You", "Love's a Game" and "I See You, You See Me".

Following the release of their debut album, the remainder of 2005 and the first few months of 2006 were spent touring and promoting their album and singles, throughout the UK and United States, across Europe and also in New Zealand, Australia and Japan. Their Japanese tour was featured as a side documentary on Jonathan Ross's Japanorama.

They received a large amount of press attention for being the first band to walk off the TV show Top of the Pops after host Richard Bacon allegedly insulted their physiques (calling them "a big fat melting pot of talent" in their introduction) shortly before they were due to appear on the show to promote their single "Love Me Like You".

The album was shortlisted in 2005 for the coveted Mercury Music Prize.

=== Those the Brokes ===
After their heavy touring and promotion of their self-titled debut, The Magic Numbers would return in autumn of 2006 with their follow-up album, Those the Brokes. The band did another extensive run of shows to promote and tour for the album, including supporting The Who in Southampton, and an appearance at the 2007 Glastonbury Festival.

The album was partly recorded in New York at Allaire Studios in Spring 2006, a venue which has also been used in the past by David Bowie, The Strokes and Ryan Adams, and was recorded and engineered by Richard Wilkinson.

A live album entitled Live at the Kentish Town Forum was released in February 2007, featuring a live performance of songs from both of the band's two albums.

=== The Runaway ===
The band took some time off during 2008, before reconvening in late 2009 to begin work on their third studio album. The band's website was updated to inform fans that the new album would be entitled The Runaway. The album was produced by Romeo Stodart with Valgeir Sigurðsson, who has previously worked with artists such as Björk, Bonnie Prince Billy and Múm. The album was mixed by Ben Hillier, and features string arrangements by the late Robert Kirby, who worked on Nick Drake's Five Leaves Left album. The album was released on 26 July 2010.

The Magic Numbers played at the 2010 Splendour in the Grass festival. During their time in Australia, they did shows in Melbourne and Sydney with Blue Mountains band Cloud Control. They also played at the annual Glastonbury Festival.

=== Michele Stodart solo career ===
In 2012, Michele Stodart released a solo album with a strong country music influence, Wide-Eyed Crossing, accompanying herself on the guitar. It contains a duet with Conor O'Brien from the Villagers and was promoted on a solo tour by Stodart.

In 2016, she released her second solo album, Pieces, on One Little Indian Records. The album featured guest appearances from her brother Romeo Stodart and singer-songwriter Kathryn Williams.

=== Acoustic tour and fourth album ===
In May 2013, The Magic Numbers announced their first-ever acoustic tour. The five-week tour saw the band play in theatres, churches and live music venues across the UK and Ireland supported by British act Goldheart Assembly.

In 2013, the band acted in The Harry Hill Movie, as bed & breakfast proprietors in Blackpole. The band's fourth album Alias was released in August 2014.

In November 2015, The Magic Numbers toured the UK with McAlmont and Butler, acting as the supporting act and also providing backing vocals and rhythm section to the duo.

== Discography ==
=== Studio albums ===
List of studio albums, with selected chart positions and certifications
Title	Details	Peak chart positions										Certifications (sales thresholds)
Title	Details	UK	AUS	BEL (FL)	FRA	GRE	IRE	NLD	SCO	SWE	US Heat	Certifications (sales thresholds)
The Magic Numbers	Released: 13 June 2005; Label: Heavenly/EMI	7	61	33	142	—	12	38	11	11	34	BPI: 2× Platinum; IRMA: Platinum
Those the Brokes	Released: 6 November 2006; Label: Heavenly/EMI	11	— (Note: Those the Brokes did not enter the Australian ARIA Albums Chart but peaked at number 14 on the ARIA Hitseekers Chart.)	34	—	—	25	41	13	3	—	BPI: Gold; IRMA: Gold
The Runaway	Released: 26 July 2010; Label: Heavenly	46	—	78	—	43	94	90	59	32	—	
Alias	Released: 18 August 2014; Label: Caroline/Universal	57	—	86	—	—	—	—	83	—	—	
Outsiders	Released: 11 May 2018; Label: Role Play, Black Candy	55	—	—	—	—	—	—	42	—	—	

=== Live album ===
- Live At The Islington Assembly Hall (5 December 2018)

=== EPs ===
- Undecided EP (3 September 2007)

The EP featured alternate versions of two tracks from their 2006 album Those the Brokes (an edit of "Undecided" and a re-recording of "Let Somebody In") plus four previously unreleased recordings.

1. "Undecided" (Radio Edit)
2. "Fear of Sleep"
3. "Shooter"
4. "Tonight"
5. "Let Somebody In" (Alternate Version With Strings By Robert Kirby)
6. "Sissy and the Silent Kid"
- The Pulse EP (2010)

This was a pre-release EP for their then-forthcoming album The Runaway that came out 26 July 2010. Two songs from this EP were not included in the full album.

1. "The Pulse"
2. "Dead Mirrors"
3. "This Isn't Happening"

=== Singles ===
List of singles, with selected chart positions
Title	Year	Peak chart positions				Album
Title	Year	UK	BEL (FL) Tip	IRE	SCO	Album
"Forever Lost"	2005	15	—	34	17	The Magic Numbers
"Love Me Like You"	2005	12	—	41	10	The Magic Numbers
"Love's a Game"	2005	24	—	—	25	The Magic Numbers
"I See You, You See Me"	2006	20	—	47	17	The Magic Numbers
"Take a Chance"	2006	16	—	—	16	Those the Brokes
"This is a Song"	2007	36	—	—	18	Those the Brokes
"Hurt So Good"	2009	—	—	—	—	The Runaway
"The Pulse"	2010	— (Note: "The Pulse" did not enter the UK Singles Chart, but peaked at number 44 on the UK Physical Singles Chart Top 100.)	—	—	—	The Runaway
"Why Did You Call?"	2010	— (Note: "Why Did You Call?" did not enter the UK Singles Chart, but peaked at number 48 on the UK Physical Singles Chart Top 100.)	—	—	—	The Runaway
"Shot in the Dark"	2014	—	82	—	—	Alias
"E.N.D."	2014	— (Note: "E.N.D." did not enter the UK Singles Chart, but peaked at number 62 on the UK Physical Singles Chart.)	45	—	—	Alias
"Roy Orbison"	2014	—	52	—	—	Alias
"I Don't Care If It's Christmas"	2014	—	—	—	—	Non-album single
"Sweet Divide"	2018	—	—	—	—	Outsiders
"Ride Against the Wind"	2018	—	—	—	—	Outsiders
"—" denotes a recording that did not chart or was not released in that territory.

=== Contributions ===
The Magic Numbers have made appearances on various other artists' releases, including:

- Duke Special – "Our Love Goes Deeper Than This" (backing vocals)
- The Chemical Brothers – "Close Your Eyes" (vocals)
- The Concretes – "Your Call" (vocals), "Sunbeams" (backing vocals)
- Ed Harcourt – "Revolution in the Heart" (backing vocals)
- David Kitt – "Up to You" and "Guilty Prayers, Pointless Ends" from the album, Not Fade Away (backing vocals)
- Jane Birkin – Fictions
- The Boxer Rebellion – "Flashing Red Light Means Go" (backing vocals by Angela) – from their newly released album, Union.

==== Compilation contributions ====
- Dream Brother: The Songs of Tim and Jeff Buckley (2005) – cover of Tim Buckley's "Sing a Song for You"
- Help!: A Day in the Life (2005) – "Gone Are the Days"
- Sounds Eclectic: The Covers Project (2007) – cover of Beyoncé's "Crazy in Love"
- The Saturday Sessions: The Dermot O'Leary Show (2007) – "Love Me Like You"
- The Twilight Saga: New Moon Soundtrack (2009) – "All I Believe In"
- Leader Of The Starry Skies: A Tribute To Tim Smith, Songbook 1 (2010) – cover of Cardiacs' "A Little Man and a House"
- A Tribute to Caetano Veloso (2012) – cover of Caetano Veloso' "You Don't Know Me"
