= Philippine Air Lines Flight 345 =

1967 plane crash in the Philippines

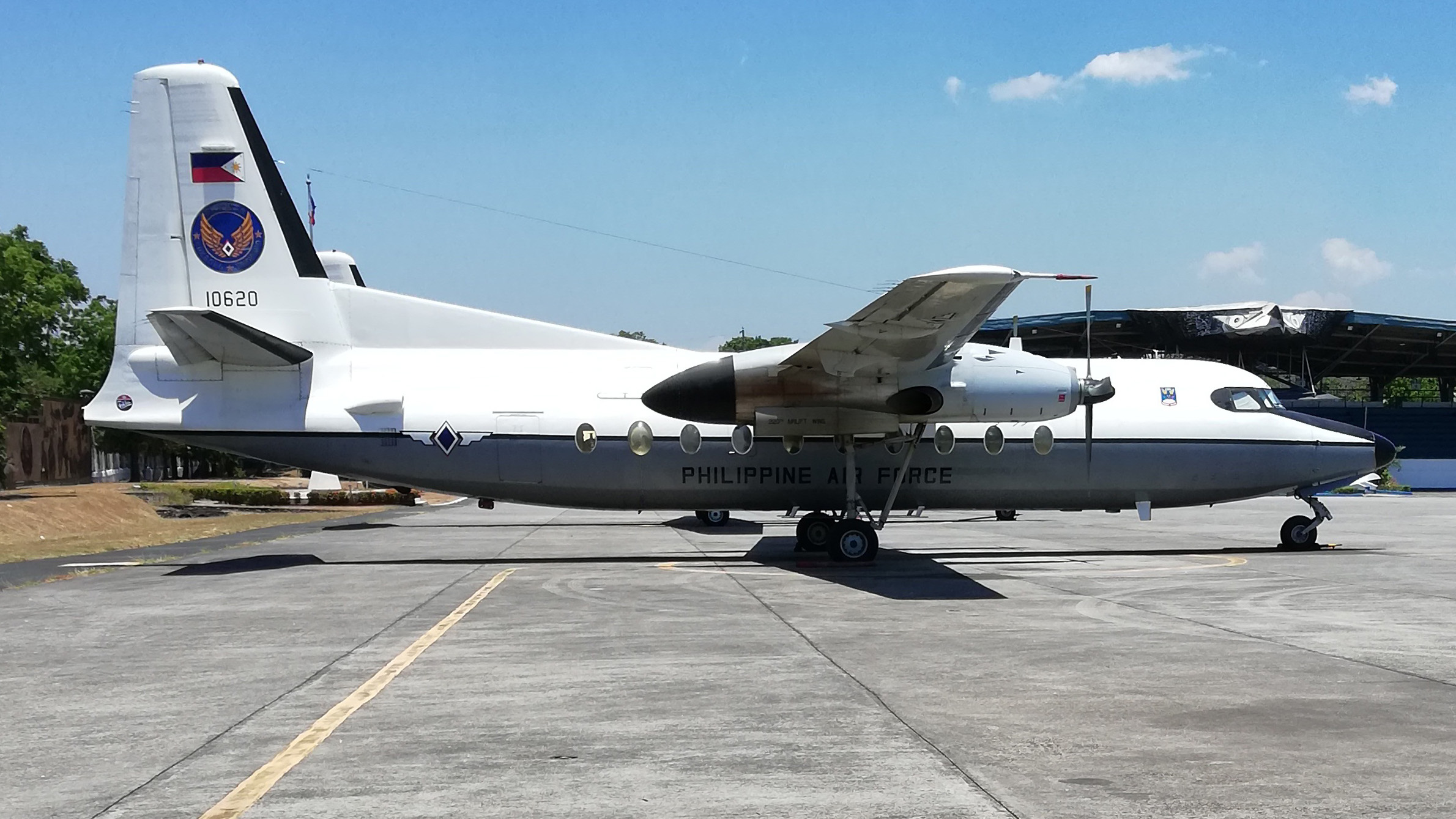
- A Philippine F-27, similar to the accident aircraft

Accident
- Date: February 28, 1967
- Summary: Loss of control on approach due to improper weight distribution
- Site: Basak, Lapu-Lapu City, 0.9 mi (1.4 km) from runway 04, near Mactan–Cebu International Airport

Aircraft
- Aircraft type: Fokker F-27 Friendship 100
- Operator: Philippine Air Lines
- Registration: PI-C501
- Flight origin: Manila International Airport, Pasay, Rizal, Philippines
- Destination: Mactan–Cebu International Airport, Lapu-Lapu City, Cebu, Philippines
- Passengers: 15
- Crew: 4
- Fatalities: 12
- Injuries: 7
- Survivors: 7

Philippine Air Lines Flight 345 was a domestic flight operated by Philippine Air Lines that crashed on approach to Mactan–Cebu International Airport, Cebu.

On February 28, 1967, the aircraft was several miles before Runway 04 when it suddenly pitched upwards in a nose-high attitude. Passengers were instructed to move to the front of the plane to equalize the load distribution, however before everyone could comply, the aircraft began banking left and right, before descending and crashing 0.9 miles (1.4 km) just before the runway threshold.

== Aircraft and crew ==
The aircraft was a Fokker F27 Friendship manufactured in 1960 and had nearly 16,000 flight hours in over 10,000 flight cycles at the time of the crash. Its airworthiness certificate was valid until April 1967.

Six months prior to the accident, maintenance records showed that the aircraft was replaced by others on 72 scheduled flights due to deficiencies, some of which were recurring. The rate of climb indicator was replaced 17 times and the airspeed indicator 16 times, and vibrations ranging from mild to severe were reported 12 times. However, these issues did not contribute to the crash.

The captain (35) held an airline pilot's license valid until April 15, 1967, with ratings for the F-27 and DC-3, and his medical record showed no waiver or limitation. He was never involved in an incident or accident, and flew approximately 8,000 hours including 1,180 hours in the F-27.

The co-pilot (24) held a commercial pilot's license valid until April 19, 1967, with ratings for civilian aircraft including the F-27 and Douglas DC-3. His medical record showed no waiver or limitation, and flew approximately 1,758 hours including 1,116 hours in the F-27.

== Accident ==
Flight 345 departed Manila at 17:20 PHT on an IFR clearance directed to Mactan via the "Amber I" airway at 13,000 feet (4,000 m). At 19:08 the pilots reported that they were descending through 6,000 feet (1,800 m) and requested a visual descent to 3,000 feet (910 m), and 5 minutes later reported that they were going to begin a VOR approach to Runway 04. At 19:17, Mactan Approach gave the flight clearance to land, however this would be the last communication from the aircraft.

Approximately 4 miles (6.4 km) from the runway threshold at 1,500 feet (460 m), the aircraft suddenly pitched upwards in a nose-high attitude, and full throttle was applied. A crew member then left the cockpit and instructed some people to move to the front of the cockpit in an attempt to equalize the load distribution. Moments later another crew member instructed all the occupants to move forward, however before this was done, the aircraft began to bank left and right, before descending in a tail low attitude.

The left wing hit a coconut tree and some banana trees before striking the ground with its wingtip for around 10 feet (3.0 m), before the left propeller also struck the ground and separated from the engine. The aircraft then nosed over and slid on its back, catching fire and destroying the fuselage.

Emergency services and fire engines arrived at the scene 25 minutes after the crash.

The wreckage was scattered over an area 80 feet (24 m) in diameter. Evidence revealed that there was no prior damage contributing to the crash, and that the flaps were retracted and the elevator trim tab was found in the full nose down position.

== Cause ==
The crew were properly certified and the aircraft was regularly maintained. Weather conditions were fine at the time of the crash, and no findings of malfunction of the engines and aircraft prior to impact were found. The Aircraft Accident Investigation Board labelled the probable cause as a loss of control at low altitude, however determined that a contributing factor was the improper distribution of load which placed the centre of gravity aft of the rear center of gravity limit.
