= The Magic Numbers (album) =

Album by the Magic Numbers

Studio album by the Magic Numbers
- Released: 13 June 2005
- Recorded: Recorded and mixed at Metropolis Studios and Konk Studios, mixed at Metropolis Mastering, mastered at Sanctuary Townhouse.
- Genre: Indie pop
- Length: 64:37
- Labels: Heavenly, EMI
- Producers: Craig Silvey and Romeo Stodart

The Magic Numbers chronology
The Magic Numbers (2005)	Those the Brokes (2006)

Singles from The Magic Numbers
- 1. "Forever Lost" Released: 23 May 2005; 2. "Love Me Like You" Released: 8 August 2005; 3. "Love's a Game" Released: 24 October 2005; 4. "I See You, You See Me" Released: 13 February 2006

The Magic Numbers is the debut album from English pop rock band the Magic Numbers. It was nominated for a Mercury Music Prize in 2005. Songwriting duties were taken by Romeo Stodart as was much of the musical composition and arrangement. It incorporated the earlier single release of "Hymn for Her" as a hidden track. The album incorporates many folk elements within the main indie sound which resounds throughout. The album also reflects many elements of the writers' early childhood dreams, tales of their love life and desperation of youth. For example, "Love Me Like You", the best known single of the album, illustrates the difference of feeling in their love for each other.

== Production ==
The Magic Numbers began recording the album in late 2004 at the Metropolis Studios in Chiswick. The album was co-produced by Romeo Stodart and American producer Craig Silvey.

== Reception ==
Professional ratings
Aggregate scores
Source	Rating
Metacritic	80/100
Review scores
Source	Rating
AllMusic	2.5/5 stars
Blender	4/5 stars
Entertainment Weekly	B+
The Guardian	4/5 stars
Mojo	5/5 stars
NME	8/10
Pitchfork	7.6/10
Q	4/5 stars
Rolling Stone	3.5/5 stars
Uncut	4/5 stars

The album was nominated for the Mercury Prize in 2005, but lost to Antony and the Johnsons' I Am a Bird Now. The Magic Numbers came 43rd on PopMatters' 50 Best Albums of 2005 list.

== Track listing ==
The Magic Numbers track listing
No.	Title	Writer(s)	Length
1.	"Mornings Eleven"	Michele Stodart, Romeo Stodart	5:34
2.	"Forever Lost"	Romeo Stodart	4:11
3.	"The Mule"	Romeo Stodart	5:11
4.	"Long Legs"	Romeo Stodart	3:22
5.	"Love Me Like You"	Romeo Stodart	4:50
6.	"Which Way to Happy"	Romeo Stodart	4:27
7.	"I See You, You See Me"	Romeo Stodart	6:00
8.	"Don't Give Up the Fight"	Romeo Stodart	2:59
9.	"This Love"	Romeo Stodart	5:40
10.	"Wheels on Fire"	Michele Stodart, Romeo Stodart	4:03
11.	"Love's a Game"	Romeo Stodart	4:48
12.	"Try/Hymn for Her"	Romeo Stodart	13:32

Japanese edition bonus tracks
No.	Title	Writer(s)	Length
16.	"Idea of a Feeling"	Sean Gannon, Romeo Stodart
17.	"I Hope You Don't Mind"	Romeo Stodart
Total length:			64:37

== Personnel ==
The Magic Numbers

- Angela Gannon – melodica, percussion, vocals, design
- Sean Gannon – drums, design
- Michele Stodart – bass guitar, keyboards, percussion, vocals, design
- Romeo Stodart – guitar, piano, vocals, production, banjo on "Mornings Eleven", design

Other personnel

- CC-Lab – design
- Angharad Davies – violin on "This Love"
- Pete Fowler – band illustration on British release
- Steve Gullick – photography
- Serge Krebs – engineering on "Which Way to Happy" and "I See You, You See Me"
- Dom Morley – assistant engineering on "Don't Give Up the Fight"
- Rich Robson – editing
- Craig Silvey – recording and production on all except "Idea of a Feeling"
- Bunt Stafford-Clark – mastering
- Richard Wilkinson – mixing on "Don't Give Up the Fight" and "This Love", additional engineering on "Mornings Eleven", "Forever Lost", "The Mule", "Long Legs", "Love Me Like You", "This Love", "Try", and "Hymn to Her"

== Charts ==
=== Weekly charts ===
Weekly chart performance for The Magic Numbers
Chart (2005–2006)	Peak position
Australian Albums (ARIA)	61
Belgian Albums (Ultratop Flanders)	33
French Albums (SNEP)	142
Irish Albums (IRMA)	12
Dutch Albums (Album Top 100)	38
Scottish Albums (Official Charts)	5
Swedish Albums (Sverigetopplistan)	11
UK Albums (Official Charts)	7
US Heatseekers Albums (Billboard)	34

=== Year-end charts ===
Year-end chart performance for The Magic Numbers
Chart (2005)	Position
UK Albums (OCC)	39
Chart (2006)	Position
UK Albums (OCC)	108

== Singles chart performance ==
Chart performance for singles from The Magic Numbers
Single (British releases)	Peak chart positions
"Forever Lost"	15
"Love Me Like You"	12
"Love's a Game"	24
"I See You, You See Me"	20

== Release history ==
Release history and formats for The Magic Numbers
Country	Date	Label	Format	Catalog
United Kingdom	13 June 2005	Heavenly	CD	HVNLP53CD
United Kingdom	13 June 2005	Heavenly	LP	HVNLP53
United States	2 August 2005	EMI	CD	312162
