= Lena Park =

American-born South Korean singer

Lena Hyun Park
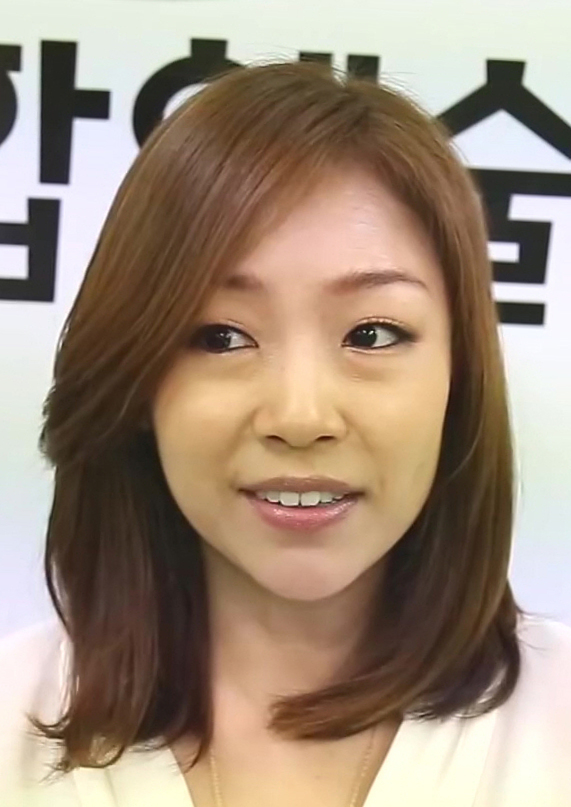
- Lena Park in 2015

Background information
- Also known as: Park Jung-hyun
- Born: March 23, 1976 (age 50); Los Angeles, California, U.S.
- Genres: Pop ballad; K-pop; J-pop; R&B
- Occupations: Singer, songwriter
- Years active: 1998–present
- Labels: Mun Hwa In (Kakao M) (2017–Present); Bonboo Entertainment

Korean name
- Hangul: 박정현
- Hanja: 朴正炫
- RR: Bak Jeonghyeon
- MR: Pak Chŏnghyŏn

Park Jung-hyun (Korean: 박정현; born March 23, 1976), also known as Lena Park (Korean: 리나 박), is a South Korean and American singer who debuted in 1998 with the album, Piece. She is also widely known in South Korea as her nickname "national fairy" due to her petite body and powerful singing voice.

== Early life and education ==
Born in Los Angeles, California, Park began singing as a child in the choir of her father's church. She won several singing contests before recording an amateur gospel album in 1993 when she was 16 years old.

Park attended UCLA for one year before beginning her singing career in 1998. She later transferred to Columbia University School of General Studies, where she graduated magna cum laude with a B.A. in English and Comparative Literature in 2010, and was inducted into Phi Beta Kappa.

== Career ==
=== 1998–2002: Piece, A Second Helping, Naturally and Op.4 ===
Park released her first Korean album, Piece, in 1998. The album sold more than 500,000 copies. She did not speak Korean very well at the time, which made it hard for her to connect with fans. In 1999, A Second Helping was released. It also was well received by both fans and the critics. Park's third album, Naturally, was mixed in both South Korea and the United States.

After a yearlong break from singing because of her studies in the United States, she came back in 2002 with her album called Op.4. More comfortable with the media, she became much more accessible for talk shows and performances. In 2002, her song "꿈에" (In a Dream) was a big success and enabled her to enter foreign markets, such as Singapore. The South Korean government select Park to represent South Korea in the opening and closing ceremonies of the 2002 FIFA World Cup. At the end of 2002, a "best of" album was released and she played a series of concerts. Live recordings from these concerts were compiled into her first special live album in CDs and DVD. Park, along with Brown Eyes (band), Chemistry (band), and Sowelu, formed the special unit conveniently called "Voices of Korea/Japan" and made the title song for the 2002 FIFA World Cup Official Album – Songs of Korea/Japan. The Korean version of Mulan uses her song "Eternal Memory". She later debuted in the Japanese music industry where she received moderate success.

=== 2005–2009: On&On, Come To Where I Am and 10 Ways To Say I Love You ===
She is especially proud of her fifth Korean language album, On & On, because she felt that she was finally comfortable and confident singing and composing in Korean. It took her about two years to make the album and, during that time, she became very involved with the production and creative work behind the album; she helped with many of the song arrangements, played the piano and guitar for some of the tracks, and composed four of the songs on the album. In 2007, she performed the opening theme Inori~You Raise Me Up～ (祈り～You Raise Me Up～) of the Japanese anime television series Romeo x Juliet, which is a Japanese cover of Rolf Løvland and Brendan Graham's song You Raise Me Up. The single also includes a cover of the English version. Her sixth Korean album, Come To Where I Am, was released on December 11, 2007. All songs were written and produced by herself. On February 27, 2009, she released her seventh album titled 10 Ways To Say I Love You with nine new tracks and "Secret" (비밀) as lead track. On June 6, of the same year, she released a repackaged edition to include another title track, "Flood of tears" (눈물이 주룩주룩).

=== 2012: Parallax ===
After announcing the release of her eighth studio album, videos of her with composers she was working with for her album introducing her songs were released online. Shortly after, on June 19, 2012, her album Parallax was released with the title track, "Sorry" (Korean: 미안해), being a remake of the Spanish language song Mientes by Mexican pop band Camila. After that, in July she featured for the Psy song What Would Have Been(어땠을까;ottessulkka), that sold over 2.000.000 digital copies in 2012. At the end of the year she released the Christmas song White Winter (하얀 겨울) with Kim Bom-soo and the special album Gift, with a reboot of Parallax album songs and where she sings again the songs of I Am a Singer program.

=== 2013–present: Mainstream success ===
In 2013 she released the cover of Atlantis Girl (아틀란티스 소녀), originally sung by BoA, for hwangseongje project superhero 1st Line up, the O.S.T My Everything for the variety show We Got Married and the O.S.T. My Wish/Only In My Heart (마음으로만) for The Heirs drama. On September 18, 2013, she won the special episode of I Am A Singer - Best 10 (나는 가수다 명곡 Best 10), beating Insooni for only three votes.

In 2014 she started the project Syncrofusion with Next Year (그 다음해) and the M/V of Double Kiss, closing it in October with "Syncrofusion 싱크로퓨전) 2nd Lena Park + Brand New Music" and a cover of her song Sweet (달아요; feat. Verbal Jint) as lead track. She participated twice in the program Immortal Songs 2 (불후의 명곡2), for the first time for Lee Sun-hee special, singing Turning the Pages of Memories (추억의 책장을 넘기면), the second time for Michael Bolton singing Completely. In December she collaborated with Dynamic Duo for "SsSs" (싱숭생숭) digital single.

In September she became an English-speaking DJ for the newest KBS radio show, One Fine Day, on KBS World Radio New. In December, Park officially signed a management contract with LOEN Entertainment (now kakao M)'s indie sub-label "Mun Hwa In". Again in December, she participated in Mnet program The Master for three episodes, singing a different version of her hit 꿈에 ("In Dreams"), 하비샴의 왈츠 (Miss Havisham's Waltz) and left the program covering 담배가게 아가씨. In December 21, Lena Park has been confirmed to join to Begin Again 2, the second season of a reality program where famous musicians from South Korea travel overseas to sing. During December 22–25 she has held her solo winter concert, named "Let It Snow" as the last year, at the SK Olympic Handball Stadium.

During the first months of 2018, she recorded for the reality show Begin Again 2 while on February 27 she sang for the 10th anniversary of the death of composer Lee Young-hoon. On April 7 she sang with others artists for POSCO's 50th Anniversary Celebration Concert at the Pohang Culture and Arts Center and on April 21 she sang 창밖의 여자 ("The Woman Outside The Window") for the first part of Cho Yong Pil special of Immortal Song. In May, the Lena Park team appear for the first time in Begin Again 2 in the last part of the seventh episode introducing her team, replacing the Kim Yoon-ah team. In the program she could sing some of her hits like 꿈에 (In Dreams), 달아요 (Sweet) and You Mean Everything To Me, duetting very often with the member of her team, in particular with Lee Su-hyun of Akdong Musician. Her cover of Someone Like You by Adele got a lot of success on TV. Naver site web, surpassing 50.000 likes. After (비긴어게인 2), on June 19 she released the single The Wonder 1st DS with 같은 우산 (Same Umbrella) as title track and starts The Wonder Tour during the summer. In November 20 she return with The Wonder 2nd DS and sings again in the Christmas period with the concerts The Wonder: Let It Snow.

In February 2019 she sings Dream for the 30th anniversary of the amusement park Lotte World and after few days she released the song 대한이 살았다, and its music video, for the 100th anniversary of the first South Korean independence movement (March 1st Movement) with Yuna Kim and 정재일 (Jeong Jae-ill). In April her return for the third season of Begin Again (비긴어게인3) is announced and she will be part of the same team with Henry, Su-Hyun, Harim and the new members Lim Heon and Kim Feel. In May she was selected by Disney Korea to promote Aladdin with John Park (존박) and on May 13 their Korean pop version of A Whole New World (아름다운 세상; arumdaun sesang) was released. After few days, on May 13, she released the O.S.T. 별빛처럼 (byeolbijjeorom; Like A Starlight) for the drama My Absolute Boyfriend (절대그이; Jeoldae Geui). On July 10 her 9th full-length album was announced to be released on July 18, seven years later to her last project Parallax (2012). On July 18 she released the 9th album The Wonder with a music video for the title track 같이 (Gachi; With You) and besides the last digital single published in 2017 and 2018, the new tracks 기억하자 (kieokahaja; "Remember") and "Seventeen", written and composed by Lena, are included.

In October 2022, she held a 4-day solo concert 'Now' at the LG Art Center Seoul from October 19 to 22.

== Discography ==
=== Studio albums ===
| Title | Album details | Peak chart positions | Sales |
| Title | Album details | KOR | Sales |
Korean
| Piece | Released: February 1, 1998; Label: DMR; Formats: CD, cassette | —N/a | —N/a |
| A Second Helping | Released: March 26, 1999; Label: DMR; Formats: CD, cassette | 5 | KOR: 300,522 |
| Naturally | Released: October 17, 2000; Label: DMR; Formats: CD, cassette | 3 | KOR: 299,857 |
| Op.4 | Released: June 13, 2002; Label: T Entertainment; Formats: CD, cassette | 2 | KOR: 296,126 |
| On & On | Released: February 3, 2005; Label: T Entertainment; Formats: CD, cassette | — | KOR: 44,375 |
| Come To Where I Am | Released: December 11, 2007; Label: T Entertainment; Formats: CD, cassette | 8 | KOR: 17,983 |
| 10 Ways To Say I Love You | Released: February 26, 2009; Label: T Entertainment; Formats: CD, digital download | —N/a | —N/a |
| Parallax | Released: June 19, 2012; Label: T Entertainment; Formats: CD, digital download | — | —N/a |
| The Wonder | Released: July 18, 2019; Label: Mun Hwa In; Formats: CD, digital download | 45 | KOR: 991 |
Japanese
| Another Piece (アナザー・ピース) | Released: November 25, 2004; Label: United Asia Entertainment; Formats: CD | —N/a | —N/a |
| Beyond The Line (ビヨンド・ザ・ライン) | Released: May 18, 2005; Label: United Asia Entertainment; Formats: CD | —N/a | —N/a |
| Cosmorama | Released: June 21, 2006; Label: United Asia Entertainment; Formats: CD | —N/a | —N/a |
"—" denotes releases that did not chart.

=== Other albums ===
| Title | Album details | Peak chart positions | Sales |
| Title | Album details | KOR | Sales |
Korean
| Forever | Unreleased songs from Piece recording; Released: May 7, 2001; Label: DMR; Formats: CD, cassette | 22 | KOR: 30,336 |
| The Romantic Story Of | Compilation album; Released: October 10, 2002; Label: DMR; Formats: CD, cassette | 18 | KOR: 24,695 |
| Op.4 Concert Project 4th Movement | Live album; Released: July 9, 2003; Label: T Entertainment; Formats: CD, cassette | —N/a | —N/a |
| The Immortal Masterpiece (불후의 명작) | Compilation album; Released: November 7, 2009; Label: Vitamin Entertainment; Formats: CD, digital download | 19 | KOR: 5,825 |
| Cover Me Vol. 1 | Remake album; Released: November 18, 2010; Label: T Entertainment; Formats: CD, digital download | — | —N/a |
| Diva Project | Extended play (with Sohyang, Lee Young-hyun); Released: August 24, 2011; Label: Monster World; Formats: CD, digital download | 37 | —N/a |
| Gift | Compilation album; Released: December 11, 2012; Label: T Entertainment; Formats: CD, digital download | 6 | KOR: 2,718 |
| Syncrofusion Lena Park + Brand New Music | Extended play (with Brand New Music artists); Released: October 21, 2014; Label: Blueprint Music; Formats: LP, digital download | 14 | KOR: 516 |
"—" denotes releases that did not chart.

=== Singles ===
| Title | Year | Peak chart positions | | Sales (Digital) | Album |
| Title | Year | KOR | JPN | Sales (Digital) | Album |
Korean
| "My Day" (나의 하루) | 1998 | — | —N/a | —N/a | Piece |
| "P.S. I Love You" | 1998 | — | —N/a | —N/a | Piece |
| "I'll Write You a Letter" (편지할께요) | 1999 | — | —N/a | —N/a | A Second Helping |
| "A Person In My Dream" (몽중인)(夢中人) | 1999 | | —N/a | —N/a | A Second Helping |
| "You Mean Everything to Me" | 2000 | — | —N/a | —N/a | Naturally |
| "I Can't Say Anything, Do Anything" (아무말도, 아무것도) | 2000 | — | —N/a | —N/a | Naturally |
| "Let's Get Together Now" with Brown Eyes, Sowelu, Chemistry | 2002 | — | —N/a | JPN: 200,000 Physical | The Official Album of the 2002 FIFA World Cup: Korea/Japan Edition |
| "In Dreams" (꿈에) | 2002 | 18 | —N/a | KOR: 498,631 | Op.4 |
| "Love Come Back" (사랑이 올까요) | 2002 | — | —N/a | —N/a | Op.4 |
| "Lost Child" (미아) | 2005 | 11 | —N/a | KOR: 584,496 | On & On |
| "Moon" (달) | 2005 | — | —N/a | —N/a | On & On |
| "Against All Odds" | 2006 | — | —N/a | —N/a | Non-album singles |
| "Precarious Story" (위태로운 이야기) | 2006 | — | —N/a | —N/a | Non-album singles |
| "Love Made of Tears" (눈물빛 글씨) | 2007 | — | —N/a | —N/a | Come To Where I Am |
| "Sweet" (달아요) | 2007 | — | —N/a | —N/a | Come To Where I Am |
| "Miracle" (기적) with Lee Hyun-woo, Lee Juck, YDG, JK Kim Dong-wook, Lee Han-cheol, WoongSan, Bizzy | 2008 | — | —N/a | —N/a | Non-album singles |
| "No Break" with Crown J | 2008 | — | —N/a | —N/a | Non-album singles |
| "Winter Kiss" (윈터키스) feat. Baek Chan of 8Eight | 2008 | — | —N/a | —N/a | Non-album singles |
| "Secret" (비밀) | 2009 | — | —N/a | —N/a | 10 Ways To Say I Love You |
| "A Flood of Tears" (눈물이 주룩주룩) | 2009 | — | —N/a | —N/a | 10 Ways To Say I Love You |
| "You Mean Everything to Me" | 2010 | 94 | —N/a | —N/a | Cover Me Vol. 1 |
| "Winter Dream" (꿈의 겨울) with Yuna Kim | 2011 | 62 | —N/a | KOR: 158,650 | Non-album single |
| "Good Night to You" (잘자요 그대) | 2011 | 61 | —N/a | KOR: 190,702 | I Am a Lyricist |
| "Person, Love" (사람, 사랑) with Kim Bum-soo | 2011 | 6 | —N/a | KOR: 810,617 | Non-album single |
| "Mermaid" (인어공주) with Sohyang, Lee Young-hyun | 2011 | 33 | —N/a | KOR: 260,864 | Diva Project |
| "Peace Song" | 2011 | — | —N/a | —N/a | Non-album single |
| "Arrivée" (도착) with Yoon Jong-shin | 2012 | 59 | —N/a | KOR: 120,434 | Monthly Project 2012 |
| "Sorry" (미안해) | 2012 | 21 | —N/a | KOR: 221,191 | Parallax |
| "White Winter" (하얀 겨울) with Kim Bum-soo | 2012 | 7 | —N/a | KOR: 535,965 | Non-album single |
| "Atlantis Princess" (아틀란티스 소녀) | 2013 | — | —N/a | KOR: 54,421 | Hwang Seong-je Project Superhero |
| "December" (회상) with YB | 2013 | 19 | —N/a | KOR: 114,410 | Non-album single |
| "Next Year" (그 다음해) | 2014 | 8 | —N/a | KOR: 151,257 | Syncrofusion single album |
| "Double Kiss" | 2014 | 63 | —N/a | KOR: 33,086 | Syncrofusion single album |
| "No Strings Attached" (잠깐 만나) feat. Hanhae | 2014 | — | —N/a | KOR: 19,666 | Syncrofusion Lena Park + Brand New Music |
| "Sweet" (Brand New Mix) (달아요) feat. Verbal Jint | 2014 | 44 | —N/a | KOR: 63,078 | Syncrofusion Lena Park + Brand New Music |
| "SsSs" (싱숭생숭) with Dynamic Duo | 2014 | 6 | —N/a | KOR: 575,768 | Non-album singles |
| "That Winter" (그 겨울) | 2015 | — | —N/a | —N/a | Non-album singles |
| "Nal dalmeun geudae" (날 닮은 그대) with Ruvin | 2015 | — | —N/a | —N/a | Non-album singles |
| "Winter Story" (겨울이야기) with Fly to the Sky | 2015 | 50 | —N/a | KOR: 22,353 | Non-album singles |
| "Courting" (연애중) | 2017 | 89 | —N/a | KOR: 22,472 | The Wonder |
| "One Umbrella" (같은 우산) | 2018 | — | —N/a | —N/a | The Wonder |
| "The End" | 2018 | — | —N/a | —N/a | The Wonder |
| "A Prayer" (대한이 살았다) with Yuna Kim, Jung Jae-il | 2019 | — | —N/a | —N/a | Non-album single |
| "With You" (같이) | 2019 | — | —N/a | —N/a | The Wonder |
| "Hot Air Balloon" (하늘을 날다) | 2022 | — | —N/a | —N/a | Non-album single |
Japanese
| "Fall In Love" (フォール・イン・ラブ) | 2004 | —N/a | — | —N/a | Another Piece |
| "Sanctuary" (サンクチュアリ) | 2005 | —N/a | — | —N/a | Beyond The Line |
| "Everything Reminds Me of You" (すべてのものにあなたを思う) | 2006 | —N/a | — | —N/a | Cosmorama |
| "Music" | 2006 | —N/a | — | —N/a | Cosmorama |
| "Gold" | 2006 | —N/a | — | —N/a | Cosmorama |
| "Jealousy" (愛のジェラシー) | 2006 | —N/a | 113 | —N/a | Non-album singles |
| "祈り～You Raise Me Up" | 2007 | —N/a | 39 | —N/a | Non-album singles |
"—" denotes releases that did not chart. The Gaon Digital Chart was established in 2010. Releases before that date may not have chart or sales data.

=== Other charted songs ===
| Title | Year | Peak chart positions | Album |
| Title | Year | KOR | Album |
Korean
| "Watercolor of a Rainy Day" (비오는 날의 수채화) | 2011 | 13 | I Am a Singer Competition 1 (나는 가수다 경연 1) |
| "First Impression" (첫인상) | 2011 | 9 | I Am a Singer Competition 2 |
| "I Hope It Would Be That Way Now" (이젠 그랬으면 좋겠네) | 2011 | 1 | I Am a Singer Competition 3-1 |
| "Shower" (소나기) | 2011 | 15 | I Am a Singer Competition 3-2 |
| "You In My Arms" (그대 내 품에) | 2011 | 13 | I Am a Singer Competition 4-1 |
| "Fool" (바보) | 2011 | 3 | I Am a Singer Competition 5-1 |
| "The Sea in My Worn Drawer" (내 낡은 서랍 속의 바다) | 2011 | 8 | I Am a Singer Competition 5-2 |
| "Eve's Warning" (이브의 경고) | 2011 | 17 | I Am a Singer Competition 6-1 |
| "If I Leave" (나 가거든) | 2011 | 2 | I Am a Singer Competition 6-2 |
| "By Chance" (우연히) | 2011 | 20 | I Am a Singer Competition 7-1 |
| "It's Only My World" (그것만이 내 세상) | 2011 | 6 | I Am a Singer Competition 7-2 |
| "Scars Deeper Than Love" (사랑보다 깊은 상처) with Kim Bum-soo | 2011 | 10 | I Am a Singer "Scars Deeper Than Love" |
| "Love Song" (널 붙잡을 노래) | 2011 | 43 | I Am a Singer Special Performance in Australia |
| "Only with My Heart" (마음으로만) | 2013 | 8 | The Heirs OST |
| "You and I" (그대 그리고 나) | 2014 | 66 | Temptation OST |
| "Haircut" (미장원에서) | 2015 | 94 | I Am a Singer Season 3 Episode 1 |
| "One Day Long Ago" (오래전 그날) | 2015 | 67 | I Am a Singer Season 3 Episode 4 |
| "Thank You" | 2015 | 63 | I Am a Singer Season 3 Episode 5 |

== Filmography ==
=== Television show ===
| Year | Title | Role | Notes | Ref. |
|---|---|---|---|---|
| 2012 | Hidden Singer | Contestant | Winner of the pilot episode | |
| 2021 | Joseon Top Singer | Judges | | |
| 2021 | Cooking - The Birth of a Cooking King | Contestant | | |
| 2022 | Hidden Singer | Contestant | 10-year anniversary of the pilot | |
| 2023 | Begin Again - Intermission | Cast Member | Spin-off | |

=== Web shows ===
| Year | Title | Role | Ref. |
|---|---|---|---|
| 2022 | Take 1 | Participant | |

== Awards and nominations ==
| Year | Award | Category | Nominated work | Result | Ref. |
|---|---|---|---|---|---|
| 1999 | Mnet Asian Music Awards | Best Female Artist | "A Person in My Dreams" (몽중인) | Nominated | |
| 2002 | Golden Disc Awards | Popular Music Video | "In Dreams" | Won | |
| 2002 | Mnet Asian Music Awards | Best R&B Performance | "In Dreams" | Won | |
| 2005 | Mnet Asian Music Awards | Best R&B Performance | "Moon" (달) | Nominated | |
| 2011 | MBC Entertainment Awards | Popular Singer Award | I Am a Singer | Won | |
| 2011 | Melon Music Awards | Top Ten Artists | —N/a | Won | |
| 2011 | Style Icon Asia | Style Icon (Singer) | —N/a | Won | |
| 2013 | Korean Music Awards | Female Musician of the Year (Netizen Vote) | —N/a | Won | |
