= Gmina Gaszowice =

Gmina Gaszowice Gaszowice Commune
- Gmina
- Coat of arms
- Interactive map of Gmina Gaszowice
- Coordinates (Gaszowice): 50°6′32″N 18°25′51″E
- Country: Poland
- Voivodeship: Silesian
- County: Rybnik
- Seat: Gaszowice

Area
  - Total: 19.54 km^{2} (7.54 sq mi)

Population (2019-06-30)
  - Total: 9,755
  - Density: 499.2/km^{2} (1,293/sq mi)
- Website: https://www.gaszowice.pl

Gmina Gaszowice is a rural gmina (administrative district) in Rybnik County, Silesian Voivodeship, in southern Poland. Its seat is the village of Gaszowice, which lies approximately 9 kilometres (6 mi) west of Rybnik and 44 km (27 mi) west of the regional capital Katowice.

The gmina covers an area of 19.54 square kilometres (7.5 sq mi), and as of 2019, its total population was 9,755.

The gmina contains part of the protected area called the Rudy Landscape Park.

== Villages ==
Gmina Gaszowice contains the villages and settlements of Czernica, Gaszowice, Łuków, Piece and Szczerbice.

== Neighbouring gminas ==
Gmina Gaszowice is bordered by the towns of Pszów and Rydułtowy, and by the gminas of Jejkowice and Lyski.

== Twin towns – sister cities ==
Gmina Gaszowice is twinned with:

- Krompachy, Slovakia
