= Those the Brokes =

Album by The Magic Numbers

Studio album by The Magic Numbers
- Released: 6 November 2006 (UK); 17 July 2007 (US)
- Recorded: Allaire Studios, New York City, United States
- Genre: Alternative rock
- Length: 64:28
- Label: Heavenly (UK); EMI (U.S.)
- Producer: Richard Wilkinson

The Magic Numbers chronology
The Magic Numbers (2005)	Those the Brokes (2006)	The Runaway (2010)

Professional ratings
Aggregate scores
Source	Rating
Metacritic	65/100 link
Review scores
Source	Rating
AllMusic	link
The Guardian	link
Pitchfork	6.3/10 link
Twisted Ear	link

Those the Brokes is the second album from The Magic Numbers. The album was partly recorded in New York at Allaire Studios in Spring 2006, a venue which has also been used in the past by David Bowie, The Strokes and Ryan Adams, and was recorded and engineered by Richard Wilkinson.

== Track listing ==
All songs written by Romeo Stodart, except where noted

UK:

1. "This Is a Song" – 5:22
2. "You Never Had It" – 2:58
3. "Take a Chance" – 3:32
4. "Carl's Song" – 5:30
5. "Boy" – 4:01
6. "Undecided" – 6:37
7. "Slow Down (The Way It Goes)" – 6:56
8. "Most of the Time" – 5:09
9. "Take Me or Leave Me" (Michele Stodart) – 4:41
10. "Let Somebody In" (The Magic Numbers) – 3:34
11. "Runnin' Out" – 5:02
12. "All I See" – 4:10
13. "Goodnight" – 6:59

US:

1. "This Is a Song"
2. "You Never Had It"
3. "Take a Chance"
4. "Boy"
5. "Undecided"
6. "Slow Down (The Way It Goes)"
7. "Keep It in the Pocket"
8. "Take Me or Leave Me" (Michele Stodart)
9. "Let Somebody In" (The Magic Numbers)
10. "Runnin' Out"
11. "Goodnight" / "All I See" (hidden track)

== Personnel ==
The Magic Numbers

- Angela Gannon – melodica, percussion, Vocals, design
- Sean Gannon – drums, design
- Michele Stodart – bass guitar, keyboards, percussion, vocals, design
- Romeo Stodart – guitar, piano, vocals, production, design

== Chart positions ==
Chart (2006–07)	Peak position
Belgian Albums (Ultratop Flanders)	34
Irish Albums (IRMA)	25
Dutch Albums (Album Top 100)	41
Swedish Albums (Sverigetopplistan)	3
UK Albums (OCC)	11
