= Szczerbice =

- Village
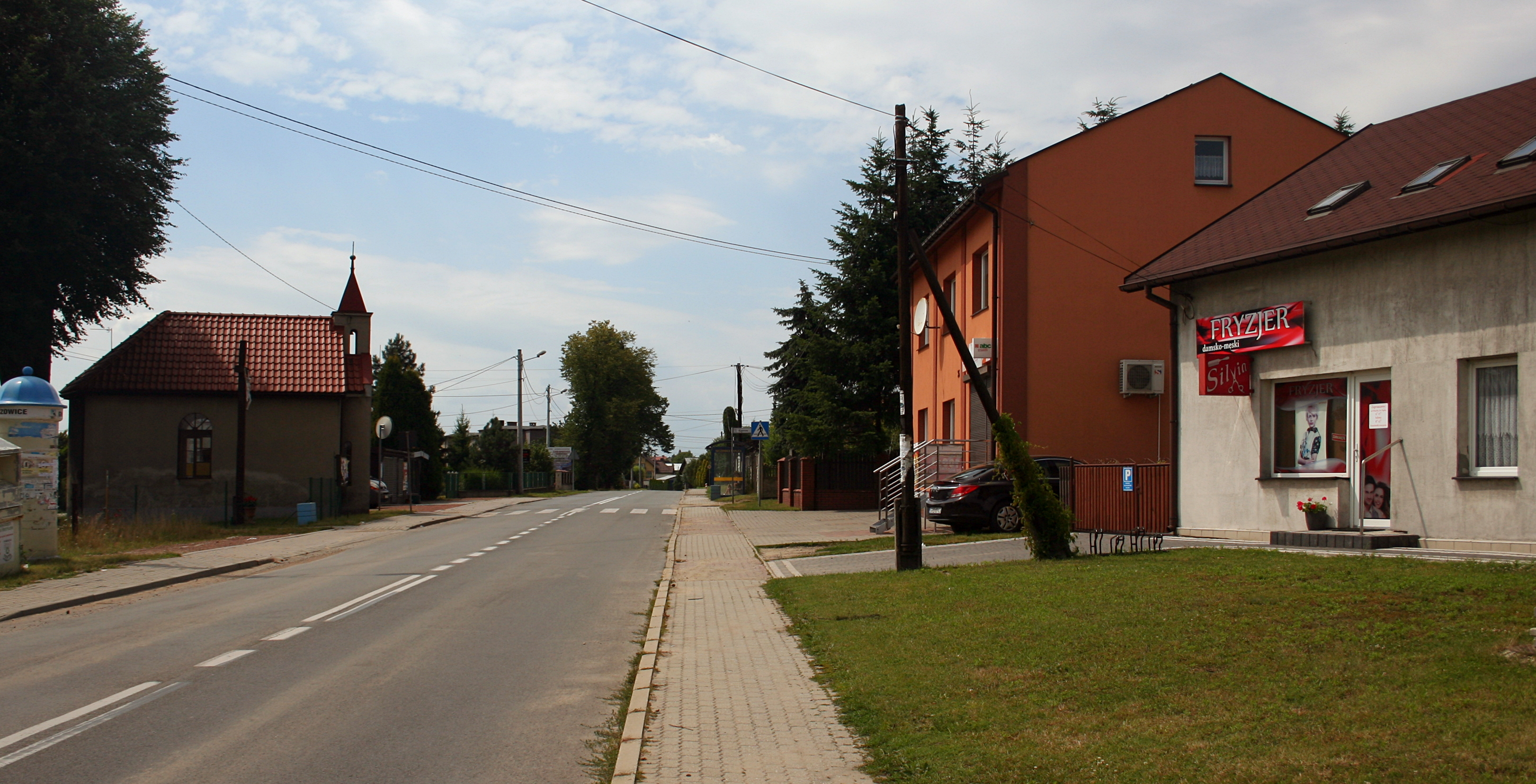

- Location within Poland
- Coordinates: 50°6′25″N 18°26′19″E
- Country: Poland
- Voivodeship: Silesian
- County: Rybnik
- Gmina: Gaszowice
- Population: 1,980
- Website: https://www.gaszowice.pl/o-gminie/solectwo/szczerbice.html

Szczerbice [ʂt͡ʂɛrˈbit͡sɛ] is a village in the administrative district of Gmina Gaszowice, within Rybnik County, Silesian Voivodeship, in southern Poland.
