= Darkovice =

- Municipality
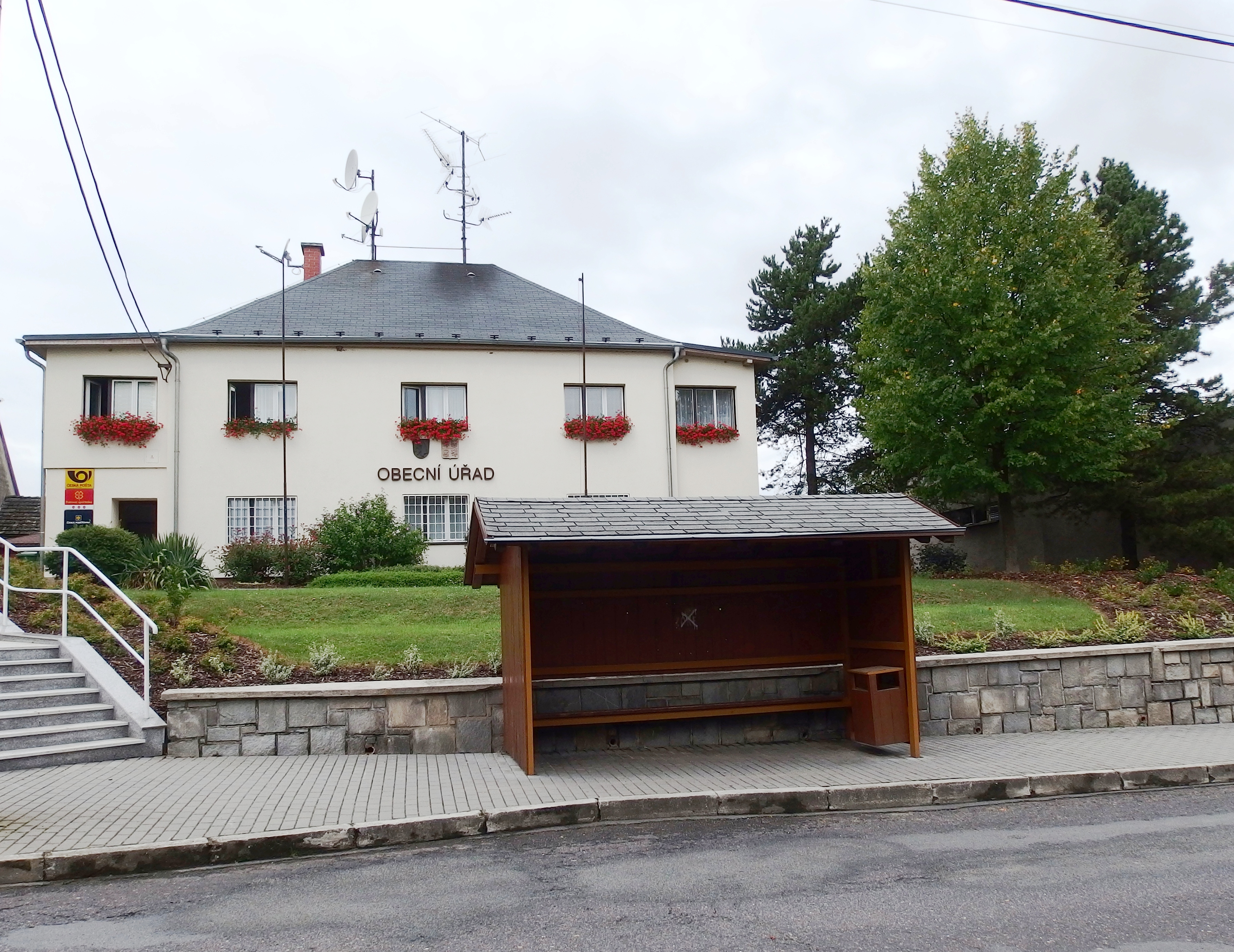
- Municipal office

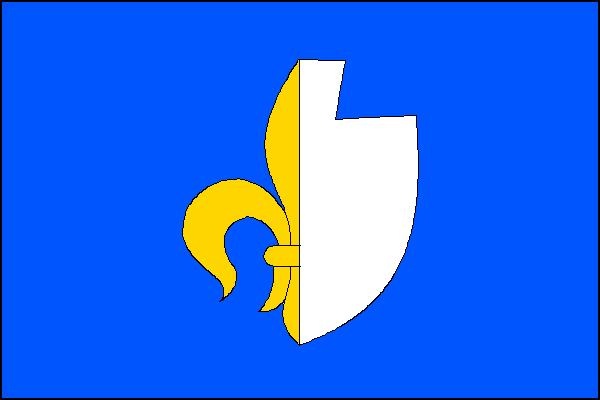
- Flag Coat of arms

- Location in the Czech Republic
- Coordinates: 49°56′9″N 18°13′20″E
- Country: Czech Republic
- Region: Moravian-Silesian
- District: Opava
- First mentioned: 1250

Area
  - Total: 5.14 km^{2} (1.98 sq mi)
- Elevation: 242 m (794 ft)

Population (2026-01-01)
  - Total: 1,362
  - Density: 265/km^{2} (686/sq mi)
- Time zone: UTC+1 (CET)
  - Summer (DST): UTC+2 (CEST)
- Postal code: 747 17
- Website: www.darkovice.cz

Darkovice (German: Groß Darkowitz) is a municipality and village in Opava District in the Moravian-Silesian Region of the Czech Republic. It has about 1,400 inhabitants. It is part of the historic Hlučín Region.

== Geography ==
Darkovice is located about 22 kilometres (14 mi) east of Opava and 12 km (7 mi) north of Ostrava. It lies in the Opava Hilly Land. The highest point is at 286 m (938 ft) above sea level.

== History ==
The first written mention of Darkovice is in a deed of Pope Innocent IV from 1250, in which it is stated that King Wenceslaus I of Bohemia donated the village to the Cistercian monastery in Velehrad. Before 1265 a new village called Žibřidovice was established near Darkovice, and the oldest pond in the region was established between them. After the death of King Ottokar II, battles for inheritance took place, and Žibřidovice ceased to exist and Darkovice was abandoned during this war.

In 1320, Darkovice became part of the Landek estate and was administered by the burgrave Přesek of Lichnov, who restored the village. In 1517, Duke Casimir II attached Darkovice to the Hlučín estate. However, Štěpán of Vrbno split this heritage in 1568. By this act, the village fell into the possession of Karel of Vrbno as a part of the Šilheřovice estate.

Darkovice was acquired by the Jesuits from Opava in 1673. Their rule led to a series of rebellions in 1734. From 1742 the village belonged to Prussia after Empress Maria Theresa had been defeated. The corvée was abolished here in 1823, 25 years earlier than in the rest of the Kingdom of Bohemia. In 1920, Darkovice became part of the newly established Czechoslovakia.

From 1979 to 1990, the municipality was annexed to Hlučín, but since 1990 Darkovice has been again an independent municipality.

== Demographics ==
Historical population

Year	Pop.	±%
1869	499	—
1880	567	+13.6%
1890	679	+19.8%
1900	865	+27.4%
1910	872	+0.8%

Year	Pop.	±%
1921	989	+13.4%
1930	1,003	+1.4%
1950	1,090	+8.7%
1961	1,207	+10.7%
1970	1,159	−4.0%

Year	Pop.	±%
1980	1,186	+2.3%
1991	1,177	−0.8%
2001	1,217	+3.4%
2011	1,272	+4.5%
2021	1,291	+1.5%

Source: Censuses

== Transport ==
There are no railways or major roads passing through the municipality.

== Sights ==
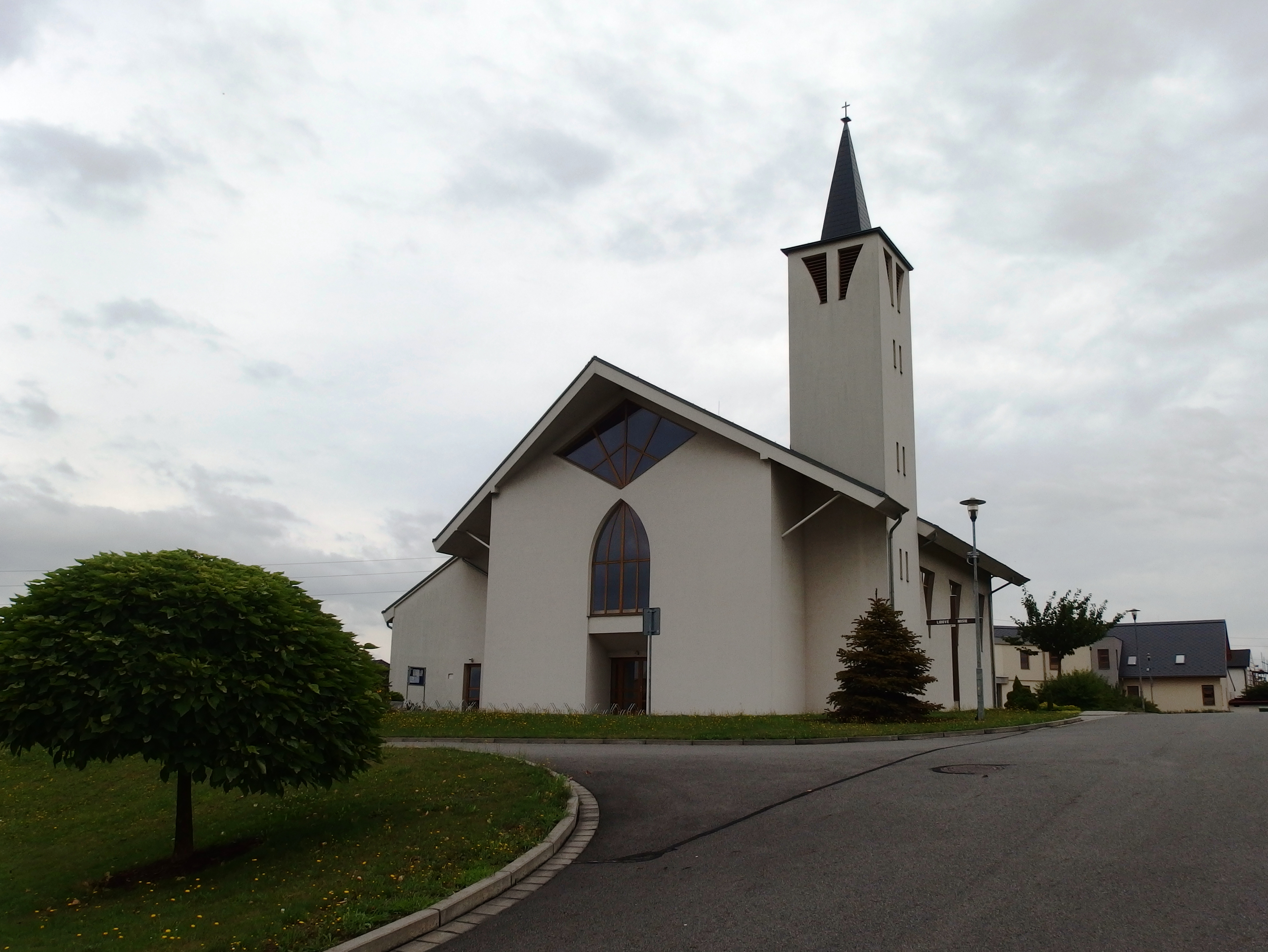
Church of Saint Hedwig

A cultural monument is the set of objects belonging to the Czechoslovak border fortifications built in 1935–1938. Four such objects are located in the territory of Darkovice.

The main landmark of Darkovice is the Church of Saint Hedwig. It is a modern church built in 2005.

== Twin towns – sister cities ==
Darkovice is twinned with:

- Lyski, Poland
