= Gaszowice, Silesian Voivodeship =

Gaszowice
- Village
- Gaszowice village. Piecowska Street; Date unknown (1920-1950?)

- Location within Poland
- Coordinates: 50°06′32″N 18°25′51″E
- Country: Poland
- Voivodeship: Silesian
- County: Rybnik
- Gmina: Gaszowice
- Established: 12th century
- Population (2006): 2,500
- Time zone: UTC+1 (CET)
  - Summer (DST): UTC+2 (CEST)
- Postal code: 44-293
- Area code: +48 32
- Car Plates: SRB
- Website: www.gaszowice.pl

Gaszowice [ɡaʂɔˈvit͡sɛ] is a village in southern Poland located in the Silesian Voivodeship in Rybnik County (Gmina Gaszowice). From 1975 to 1998, the village belonged to and was administered by the Katowice Voivodeship.

== Name ==
The name Gaszowice comes from the name of a knight called Gasz, who probably was the founder of the village, and built here a settlement in the 12th century.

== History ==
In 1317, the village belonged to the Duchy of Racibórz. Gaszowice's coat of arms contains a plowshare which also exists on the German seal from 18th century. Gaszowice has only one elementary school. Władysław Dworaczek was one of the teachers who started teaching there in 1932. Later from 1945 till 1972 he was the principal of the school.

== Twin towns — sister cities ==
Gaszowice is twinned with:

- Krompachy, Slovakia
