= The Runaway (album) =

Studio album by The Magic Numbers
- Released: 7 June 2010
- Recorded: Metropolis Studios and Konk Studios
- Genre: Alternative rock
- Label: Heavenly
- Producers: Romeo Stodart and Valgeir Sigurðsson

The Magic Numbers chronology
Those the Brokes (2006)	The Runaway (2010)	Alias (2014)

The Runaway is the third album from London indie-rock band The Magic Numbers. The Stodart and Gannon siblings reveal a rather upbeat side on this offering, compared to their 2006 release Those the Brokes. The album features string arrangements by Robert Kirby (Nick Drake, Elvis Costello), who died in 2009, with The Runaway ultimately proving to be his final piece of work.

== Track listing ==
All songs written by Romeo Stodart and Michele Stodart, except where noted.

1. "The Pulse" (R. Stodart)
2. "Hurt So Good" (R. Stodart)
3. "Why Did You Call?"
4. "Once I Had"
5. "A Start With No Ending" (R. Stodart)
6. "Throwing My Heart Away"
7. "Restless River"
8. "Only Seventeen"
9. "Sound of Something"
10. "The Song That No One Knows" (R. Stodart)
11. "Dreams of a Revelation"
12. "I’m Sorry"

== Personnel ==
The Magic Numbers

- Angela Gannon – melodica, percussion, Vocals, design
- Sean Gannon – drums, design
- Michele Stodart – bass guitar, keyboards, percussion, vocals, design
- Romeo Stodart – guitar, piano, vocals, production, design

== Singles ==
The first single "The Pulse" was released on 12 April 2010

== Release details ==
A limited-edition of the album was released with an exclusive 4-track live EP which the band recorded at Wiltons Music Hall in London in January 2010.
