= Lyski =

- Village
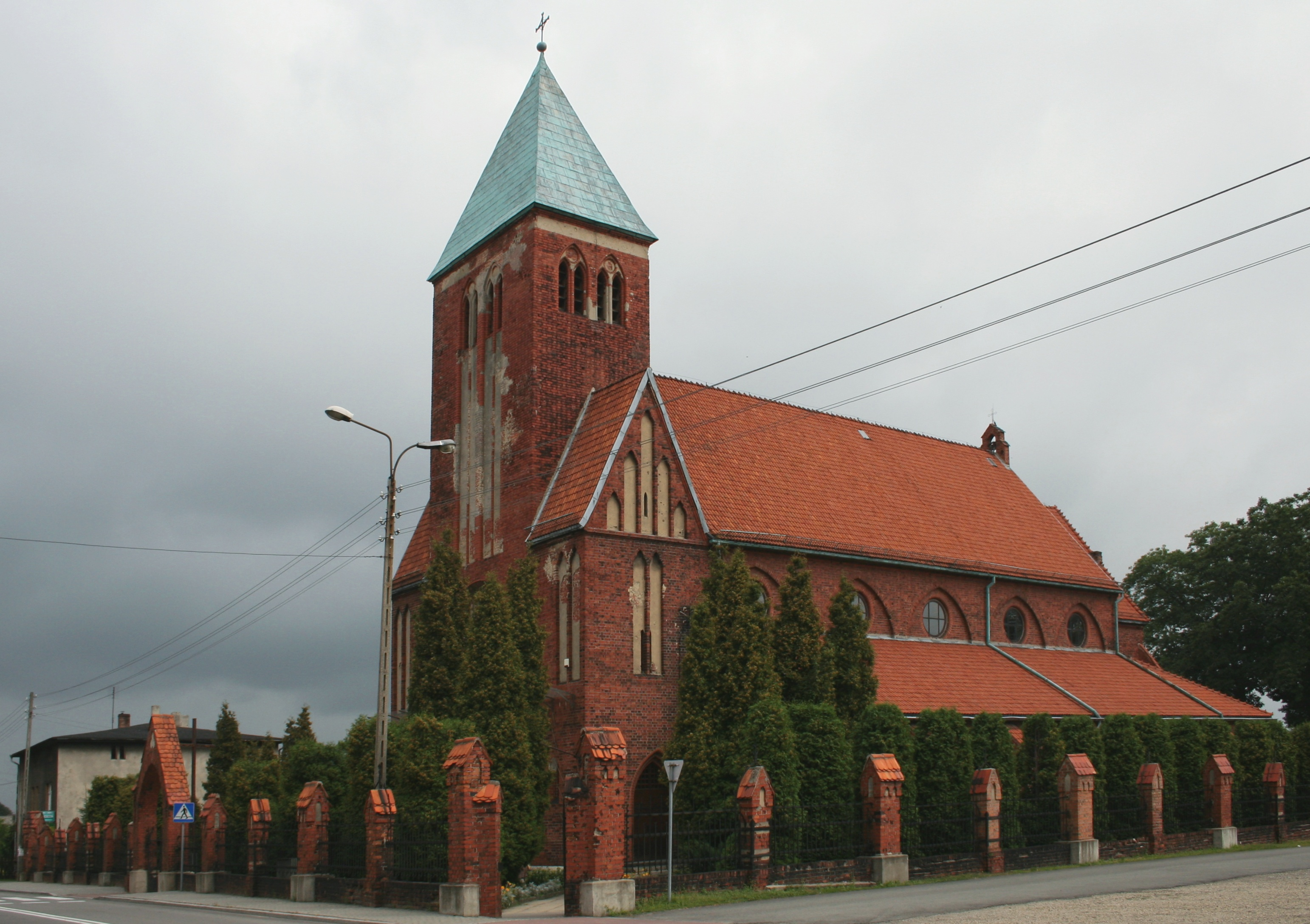
- St. Margaret church

- Location within Poland
- Coordinates: 50°7′11″N 18°23′29″E
- Country: Poland
- Voivodeship: Silesian
- County: Rybnik
- Gmina: Lyski
- Population: 1,800

Lyski [ˈlɨski] is a village in Rybnik County, Silesian Voivodeship, in southern Poland. It is the seat of the gmina (administrative district) called Gmina Lyski.
