= Czernica, Silesian Voivodeship =

Czernica
- Village
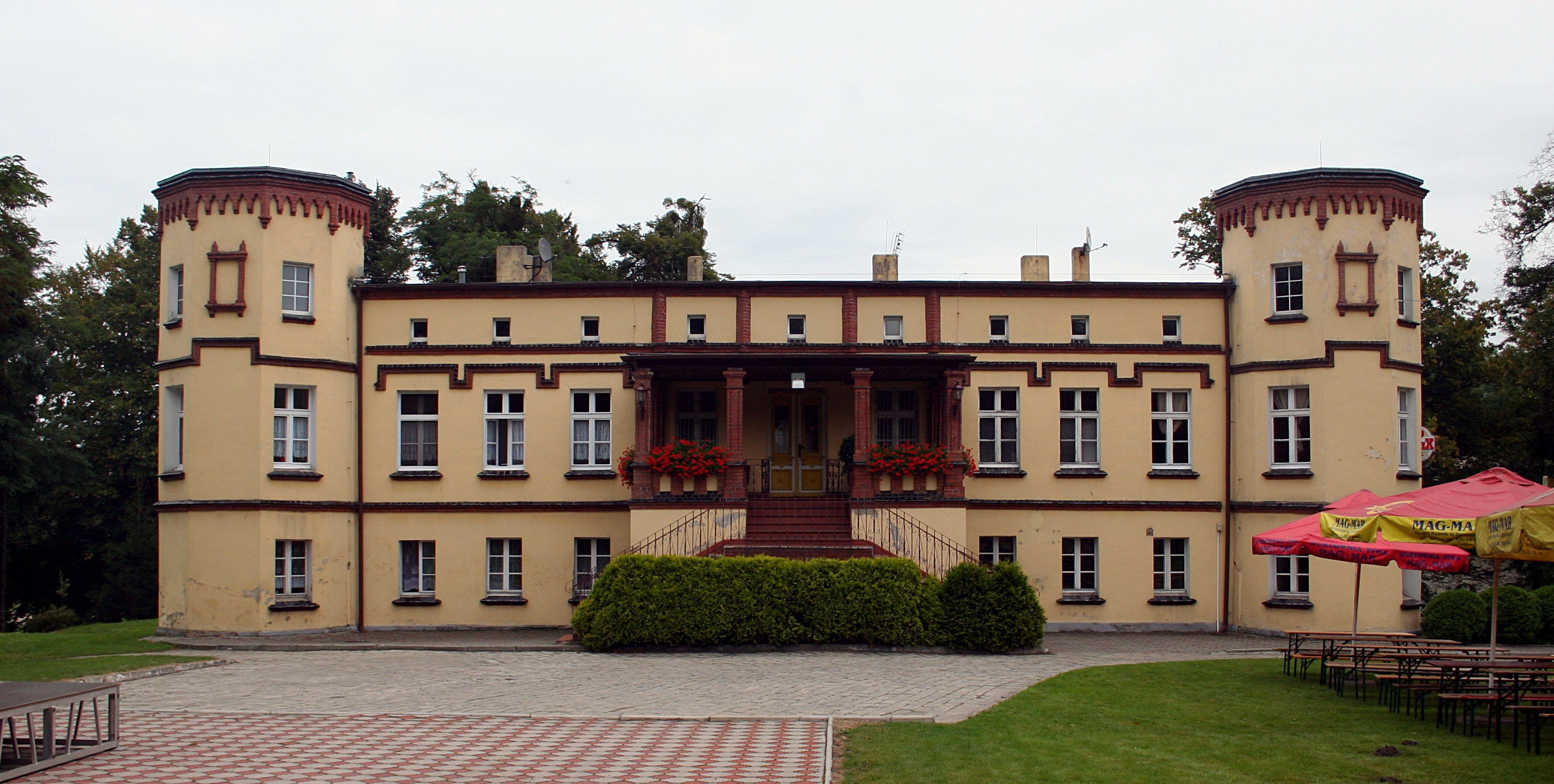
- Palace

- Location within Poland
- Coordinates: 50°4′31″N 18°23′59″E
- Country: Poland
- Voivodeship: Silesian
- County: Rybnik
- Gmina: Gaszowice
- Population (approx.): 2,100

Czernica [t͡ʂɛrˈnit͡sa] is a village in the administrative district of Gmina Gaszowice, within Rybnik County, Silesian Voivodeship, in southern Poland. The village is the birthplace of the composer Henryk Górecki.

The name of the village is derived from the river flowing through the village. Czernica was first mentioned in a document of 17 March 1317. Between 1880 and 1966, gypsum was mined nearby.

Czernica has several trees classed as natural monuments: a number of linden trees with circumferences up to 467 cm, and an oak tree with a circumference of 336 cm.
