= Basak, Lapu-Lapu City =

Barangay in Lapu-Lapu City, Philippines

Basak
- Barangay
- Location within Visayas, Philippines Location within Philippines
- Coordinates: 10°17′34″N 123°55′45″E
- Country: Philippines
- Region: Central Visayas
- Province: Cebu
- City: Lapu-Lapu City

Area
  - Total: 8.007 km^{2} (3.092 sq mi)
- Elevation: 5 m (16 ft)

Population (2020)
  - Total: 71,990
  - Density: 8,991/km^{2} (23,290/sq mi)
- Time zone: UTC+8 (PST)
- ZIP code: 6015

Basak is a barangay in Lapu-Lapu City, Cebu Province, Central Visayas, Philippines. It is bounded in the northeast by Pusok and Bankal, in the east by Pajac and Agus, in the southeast by Marigondon and Subabasbas, in the west by Babag and Gun-ob, and in the northwest by Pajo. In 2020, Basak was home to 71,990 residents.

Etymology of Basak: In Cebuano, "Basak" means "wet rice field," indicating the area's agricultural roots.

2018 - 2023 Barangay Officials

Punong Barangay: Isabelito L. Darnayla

Sangguniang Barangay Member

Fulvio L. Darnayla

Carlos O. Amoro

Alberto J. Ochea

Ronie T. Yagong

Albes N. Potot

Evangeline M. Limpangug

Benito M. Ybañez

SK Chairperson / Ex-Officio Sangguniang Barangay Member: June Anthony O. Doble

2018 - 2023 Sangguniang Kabataan Officials

JUNE ANTHONY O. DOBLE

SK Chairperson / Ex-Officio Sangguniang Barangay Member

Sangguniang Kabataan Members:

Mica T. Carvajal

Sydel Angela P. Tampus

Christian Jade P. Digal

Zyra Mae N. Ybañez

Jenny Babe D. Verdida

Jayson S. Dignos

Andrew C. Paroco

== Geography ==
Basak is situated in the south of Lapu-Lapu City, north of the Gabi River. It has an area of 8.007 square kilometers. It has an average elevation of 5 meters above sea level.

== Places ==
Here are the places in Basak, Lapu-Lapu City.

=== Collinwood Subdivision ===
The Collinwood Subdivision is a subdivision in Basak. It consists of four phases, and one, two or 2+ blocks on each phase, and consists of streets starting from Santa, or San, by regions. Collinwood Subdivision has a multipurpose hall located next to the gate, and the gate is located at the entry of the subdivision, with which tailgating for sticker lanes, and vehicles use at enter or exit. Taxis, motorcycles and buses can go to the other priority lane, by entry or exit. The typical area is about 2.23 square kilometers (0.86 square miles) of the subdivision. They also had a plaza in Sn. Andres and Sta. Isabel, the middle of the Collinwood Subdivision. The subdivision has speed bumps only in Sta. Isabel, but the near subdivision by residences near the gate are called the Brentwood Subdivision. Brentwood Subdivision also had a gate. Outside the subdivision, they have a marketplace (such as the meat market, the bike shop, the pizza and bakery, the animal clinic, the coffee shops, and the spa), and the main road of this subdivision is the Collinwood Subdivision Road.

=== Gaisano Grand Mall Mactan ===
Gaisano Grand Mall Mactan is a shopping mall in Basak. It was also known as “Gaisano Grand Mall Basak”, but is normally Basak and is located in the Mactan Island. It was operated by Gaisano Grand Malls. In October 2023, the mall was renamed as “Gaisano Grand Mactan”. This mall only consists of 4 floors: the ground floor is the Market and Restaurants, the upper ground is Clothing, the third floor is Kid Games, and the fourth floor is Hardware and Appliances, but the fourth floor is built as of July 2023. Gaisano Grand Mall Mactan basements are entering vehicles parking there in the mall, and are used typically about 185 parking spaces for vehicles, but the lights are usually low. Additionally, tricycles and motorcycles only can park outside by approximately 15 parking spaces.

=== Mactan Town Center ===
The Mactan Town Center is a shopping mall in Basak. They have a large portion of buildings and parking spaces. The Mactan Town Center is the largest mall in Basak. The mall’s largest restaurant is McDonald's, in Mactan Town Center, with 2 floors and a PlayPlace.
