= Władysław Dworaczek =

Polish educator and community organiser

- Born: 9 September 1912; Gleiwitz, German Empire (today Sośnica Gliwice)
- Died: 22 December 2003 (aged 91); Rybnik, Poland
- Occupation: Educator
- Spouse: Róża Cichoń
- Children: Adam Dworaczek; Marian Dworaczek; Mieczysław Dworaczek
- Parent(s): Franciszek Dworaczek; Wiktoria (Wilk?)

Władysław Dworaczek (9 September 1912 in Gleiwitz (today Gliwice) (Sośnica) – 22 December 2003 in Rybnik) was a Polish educator and community organiser, as well as a political prisoner in the Nazi concentration camps.

Władysław and Róża's Wedding 1 January 1939

== Biography ==
Dworaczek graduated from the elementary school in Kończyce, near the city of Zabrze, in 1932. He then entered a seminary for teachers in Pszczyna in 1938, finishing in 1948. Later he took courses in instruction of Polish language, in Katowice, where he subsequently pursued a master's degree course and graduated in 1951. He later received a master's degree in Polish philology from the University of Silesia in 1972.

Dworaczek began his teaching work on 1 August 1932 in the village of Gaschowitz (then in Germany, today in Poland), working until the start of World War II. During the Nazi occupation of Poland he was persecuted. From 1 May 1940 until 20 April 1941 he was a political prisoner in the 3 Nazi concentration camps: Dachau, Mauthausen and Gusen. After being discharged and unable to find employment in his field, he became a church organist in Halemba. In March 1945 he returned to Gaszowice, where he became the director of the elementary school until his retirement in 1972. He was also a member of the Polish Scouting and Guiding Association, with the Scouting Cross No. 11, one of the few that survived the Second World War in Silesia.

Władysław Dworaczek's memorial plaque

== Awards ==
- Order of Polonia Restituta Knight's Cross (Krzyż Kawalerski Orderu Odrodzenia Polski)
- Golden Cross of Merit (Złoty Krzyż Zasługi)
- Auschwitz Cross (Krzyż Oświęcimski)
- Cross of Merit for the ZHP (Krzyż za Zasługi dla ZHP)
- Commission of National Education Medal (Medal Komisji Edukacji Narodowej)
- Golden Badge of Merit for the Development of Katowice District (Złota Odznaka Zasłużonego w Rozwoju Województwa Katowickiego)
- Silver Badge of Mutual Savings Bank (Srebna Odznaka Banku Spółdzielczego)
- Badge of Merit for Rybnik city Polish Scouting and Guiding Association (Odznaka za Zasługi dla Rybnickiego Hufca ZHP)
- The Scouting Cross No.11 (Krzyż Harcerski Nr. 11)
