= Portion control =

Portion control may refer to:

- Portion Control (band), the 1980s electronic music band
- Portion control (dieting), a method of limiting caloric intake
