= Piece by Piece =

Piece by Piece may refer to:

- Piece by Piece (book), an autobiography by Tori Amos
- Piece by Piece (2005 film), a documentary film
- Piece by Piece (2024 film), an animated biographical film

== Music ==
- Piece by Piece (Kelly Clarkson album), 2015
  - "Piece by Piece" (song), title track from the above album
  - Piece by Piece Remixed, a companion remix album
- Piece by Piece (Katie Melua album)
- Piece by Piece (John Martyn album)
- "Piece by Piece", a 2001 song by Feeder, from the album Echo Park
- "Piece by Piece", a 2024 song by Pharrell Williams
- "Piece by Piece", a 1986 song by Slayer, from the album Reign in Blood
- "Piece by Piece", a 1985 song by The Tubes, from the album Love Bomb
