= Pieces (Michele Stodart album) =

Studio album by Michele Stodart
- Released: 8 July 2016
- Genre: Folk; country; blues
- Label: One Little Indian
- Producer: Michele Stodart

Michele Stodart chronology
Wide Eyed Crossing (2012)	Pieces (2016)

Pieces is the second album by Michele Stodart, released on the One Little Indian label on 8 July 2016. The album features contributions from The Magic Numbers, Romeo Stodart, Kathryn Williams & The Goat Roper Band.

== Track listing ==
All tracks are written by Michele Stodart.

No.	Title	Length
1.	"Come Back Home"
2.	"When It Is Over?"
3.	"Once In A While"
4.	"Just Anyone Won't Do"
5.	"Oh By & By"
6.	"Ain't No Woman"
7.	"Something About You"
8.	"Will You Wait?"
9.	"Over The Hill"

== Personnel ==
- Michele Stodart – vocals, acoustic guitar, bass, backing vocals, percussion, electric guitar, harmonium
- CJ Jones – drums, percussion
- Matt Skipper – electric guitar, glockenspiel
- Romeo Stodart – electric guitar, piano, Hammond organ
- Kathryn Williams – backing vocals
- Will Harvey – violin, viola
- Leo Van Bulow-Quirk – cello
- Richard Causon – piano, Hammond organ
- Goat Roper Band – backing vocals
- Correigh Anne Killick – backing vocals

== Production ==
- All songs written & produced by Michele Stodart
- Engineering and production by Ben Amesbury & Richard Causon
- Additional engineering by Ber Quinn
- Mixed by Dave Izumi Lynch at Echo Zoo Studios
- Mastered by Miles Sherwell at Abbey Road Studios
- Photography by Gavin Hammond
- Design layout by Kellie Hutchens

== Reception ==
Folkradio.co.uk reviewed the album as "More considered, more intimate and lyrically more about the storytelling" than her debut solo effort. NARC Magazine dubbed it "a beautiful record".
