= Game piece =

A game piece (or gamepiece) may refer to:

- Game piece (board game)
- Game piece (hieroglyph), in Ancient Egypt games
- Game piece (music)
- Lottery ticket

== See also ==
- Game character (disambiguation)
