= Petrous portion =

Petrous portion (From Latin petrous 'rocky') may refer to:

- Petrous portion of the temporal bone
- Petrous portion of the internal carotid artery
