= Łuków, Silesian Voivodeship =

Łuków
- Village
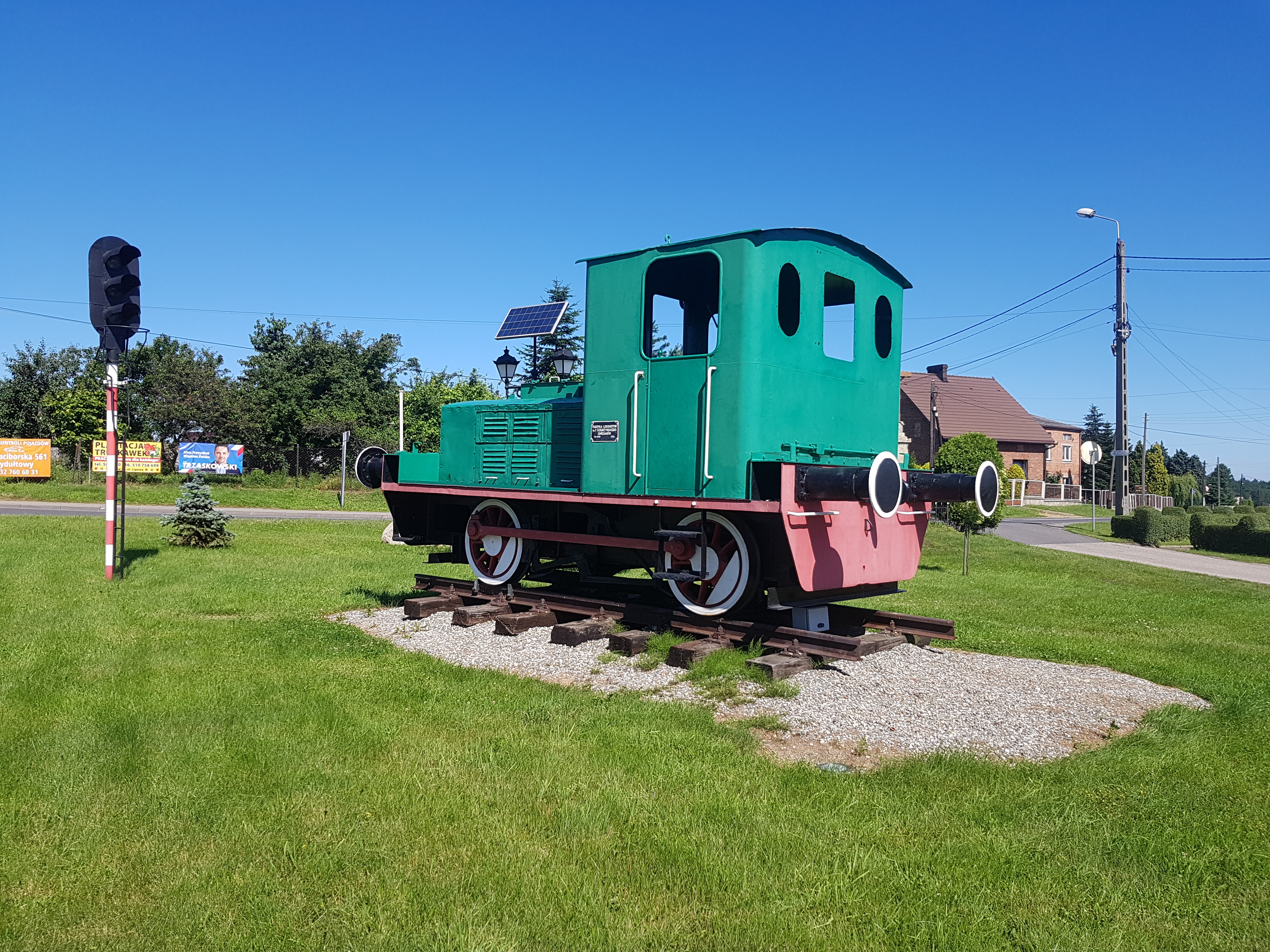

- Location within Poland
- Coordinates: 50°5′56″N 18°24′12″E
- Country: Poland
- Voivodeship: Silesian
- County: Rybnik
- Gmina: Gaszowice
- Elevation: 289.4 m (949 ft)
- Population: 730

Łuków [ˈwukuf] is a village in the administrative district of Gmina Gaszowice, within Rybnik County, Silesian Voivodeship, in southern Poland.
