= Piece, Silesian Voivodeship =

Piece
- Village
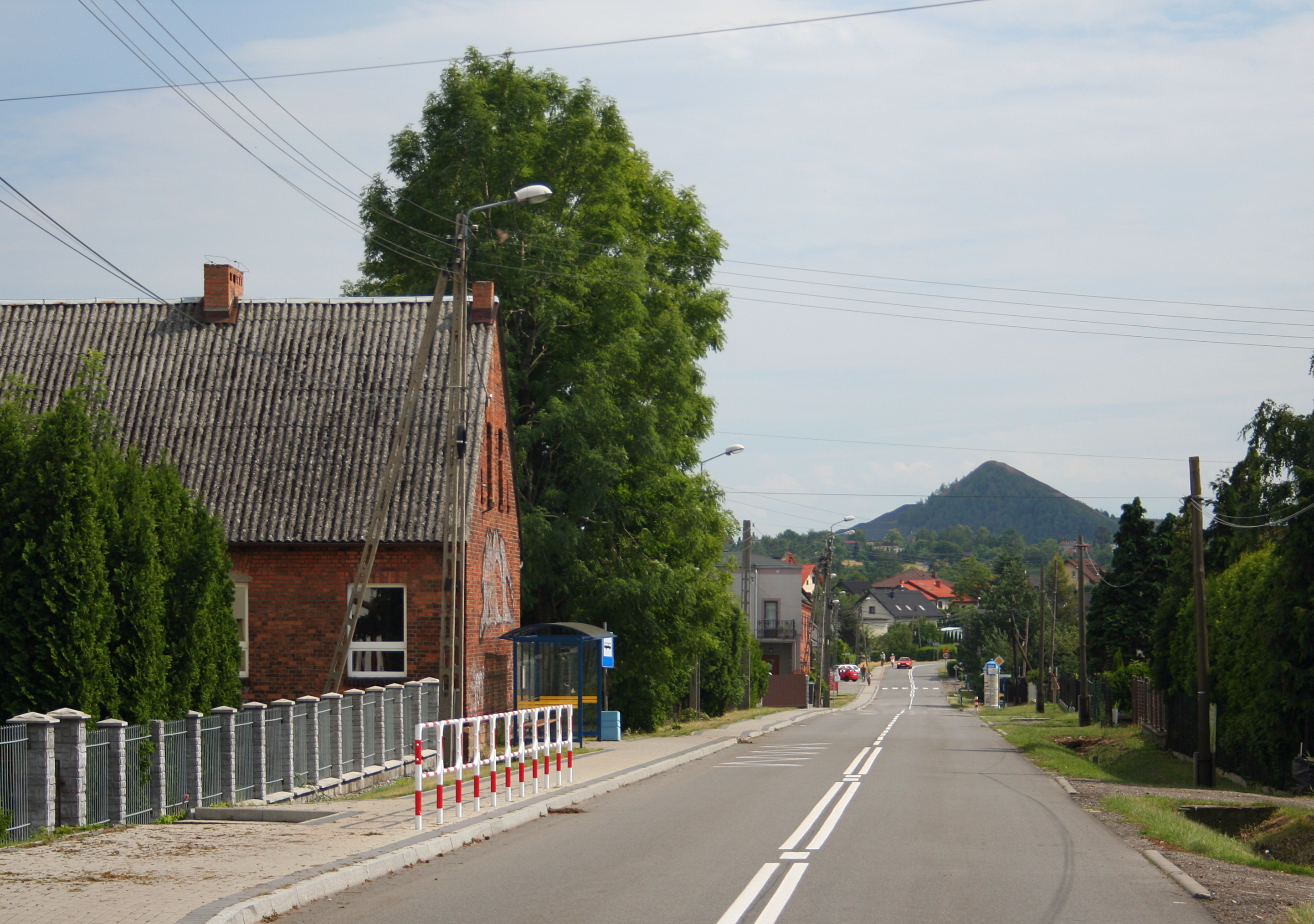

- Location within Poland
- Coordinates: 50°5′32″N 18°25′53″E
- Country: Poland
- Voivodeship: Silesian
- County: Rybnik
- Gmina: Gaszowice
- Time zone: UTC+1 (CET)
  - Summer (DST): UTC+2 (CEST)
- Vehicle registration: SRB

Piece [ˈpjɛt͡sɛ] is a village in the administrative district of Gmina Gaszowice, within Rybnik County, Silesian Voivodeship, in southern Poland.
