= Pieces of Dreams =

Pieces of Dreams may refer to:

- Pieces of Dreams (album), album by Stanley Turrentine
- Pieces of Dreams (film), 1970 American film
