= Slam dunk (disambiguation) =

A slam dunk is a type of basketball shot, in which a player thrusts the ball forcefully down through the basket.

Slam dunk may also refer to:

== Arts, entertainment, and media ==
=== Music ===
- Slam Dunk Records, a UK record label
- "Slam Dunk (Da Funk)", a 1997 song by Five
- "Slam Dunk", a song by Quiet Riot from their 1999 album Alive and Well

=== Other uses in arts, entertainment, and media ===
- Slam Dunk (film) or Kung Fu Dunk, a 2008 Chinese film loosely based on the manga
- Slam Dunk (manga), a Japanese manga series by Takehiko Inoue
- Slamdunk Film Festival, a "counter-festival" in Park City, Utah, held during the Sundance Film Festival 1998-2003

== Other uses ==
- Smash (tennis), or slam dunk

== See also ==
- Sister's Slam Dunk, a South Korean variety show
