= Cavernous portion =

Cavernous portion can refer to:

- Cavernous part of internal carotid artery
- Spongy urethra (also known as "cavernous portion")
