= Piece (Lena Park album) =

Studio album by Lena Park
- Released: February 1, 1998
- Recorded: 1998
- Genre: K-pop, R&B and Soul
- Length: 41:59

Lena Park chronology
Piece (1998)	A Second Helping (1999)

Piece is the debut album of South Korean-American recording artist Lena Park. It was released on February 1, 1998. The album sold 300,000–500,000 copies despite being released during the East Asian financial crisis.

== Track listing ==
1. Intro - 0:52
2. 나의 하루 (Naui Haru; My Day) - 4:09
3. P.S. I Love You - 3:56
4. 2Gether - 3:58
5. 반전 (Banjeon; Antiwar) - 4:32
6. The Player (feat. Players) - 4:07
7. 오랜만에 (Acoustic Version) (Oraenmane; In a Long Time) - 4:41
8. 요즘 넌... (Yojeum Neon...; You Nowadays...) - 4:06
9. 사랑보다 깊은 상처 (feat. 임재범 - Lim Jae Bum) (Sarangboda Gipeun Sangcheo; A Wound Deeper Than Love) - 4:24
10. Interlude - 0:20
11. Glorious Day for It - 4:33
12. 오랜만에 (R&B Version) (Oraenmane; In a Long Time) - 4:29
