= Dominant portion =

The term dominant portion is used in measurement of room spaces for valuation or appraisal purposes.

The dominant portion is defined as:

- the largest solid or glass area making up the inside finished surface, along a single plane, of the total permanent outer building wall.
- the portion of the inside finished surface of the permanent outer building wall which is 50% or more of the vertical floor to ceiling dimension measured at the dominant portions. If there is no dominant portion, or if the dominant portion is not vertical, the measurement for area shall be to the inside finished surface of the permanent outer building wall where it intersects the finished floor.

The second definition particularly applies to measurement of office spaces based on the Building Owners and Managers Association measurement.
