= Gmina Lyski =

Gmina Lyski Lyski Commune
- Gmina
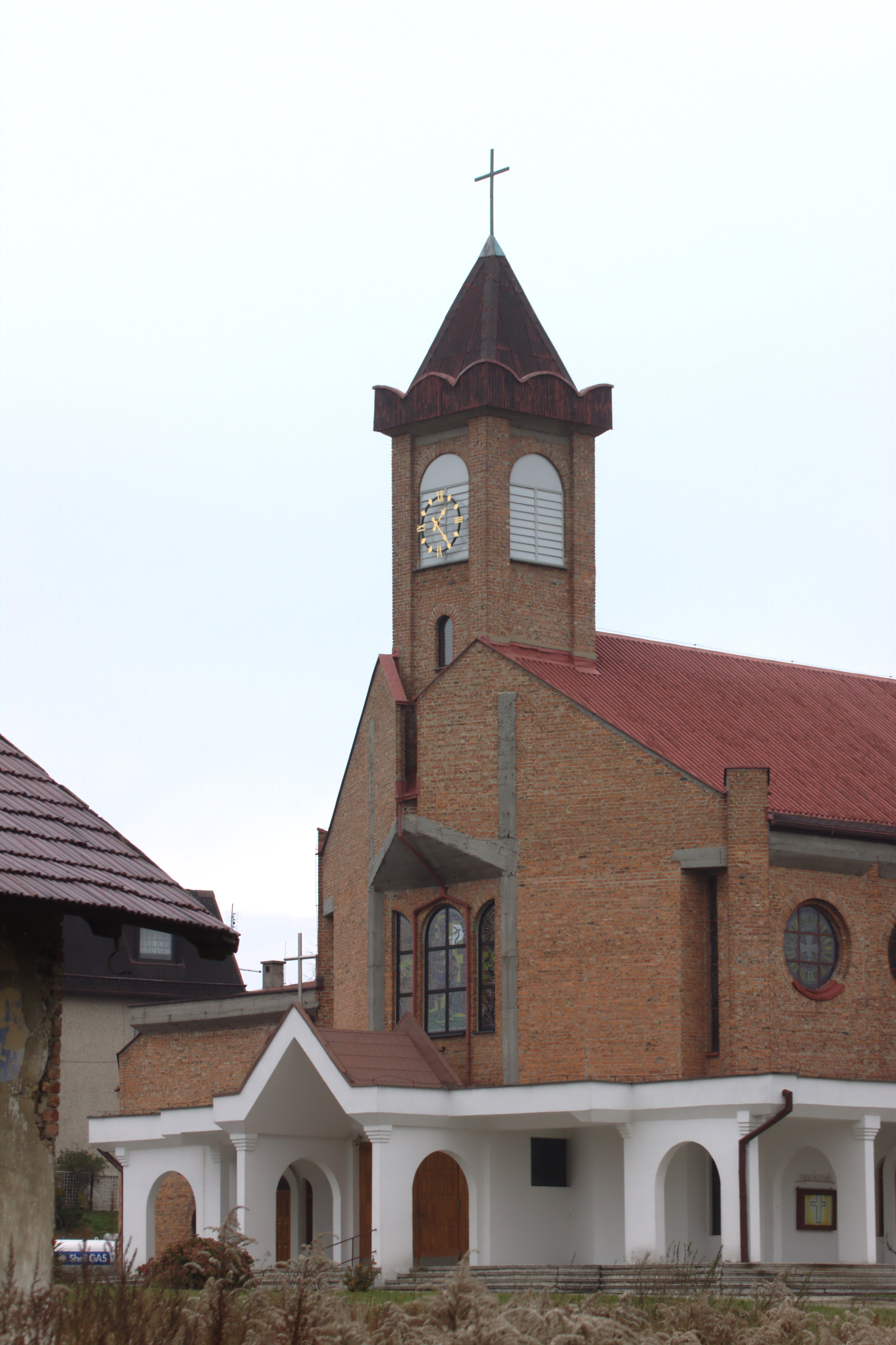
- Church in Zwonowice

- Coat of arms
- Interactive map of Gmina Lyski
- Coordinates (Lyski): 50°7′11″N 18°23′29″E
- Country: Poland
- Voivodeship: Silesian
- County: Rybnik
- Seat: Lyski

Area
  - Total: 57.83 km^{2} (22.33 sq mi)

Population (2019-06-30)
  - Total: 9,657
  - Density: 167.0/km^{2} (432.5/sq mi)
- Website: https://www.lyski.pl/

Gmina Lyski is a rural gmina (administrative district) in Rybnik County, Silesian Voivodeship, in southern Poland. Its seat is the village of Lyski, which lies approximately 13 kilometres (8 mi) west of Rybnik and 46 km (29 mi) west of the regional capital Katowice.

The gmina covers an area of 57.83 square kilometres (22.3 sq mi), and as of 2019, its total population was 9,657.

The gmina contains part of the protected area called the Rudy Landscape Park.

== Neighbouring gminas ==
Gmina Lyski is bordered by the towns of Racibórz and Rybnik, and by the gminas of Gaszowice, Kornowac, Kuźnia Raciborska and Nędza.

== Twin towns – sister cities ==
Gmina Lyski is twinned with:

- Darkovice, Czech Republic

== Gallery ==
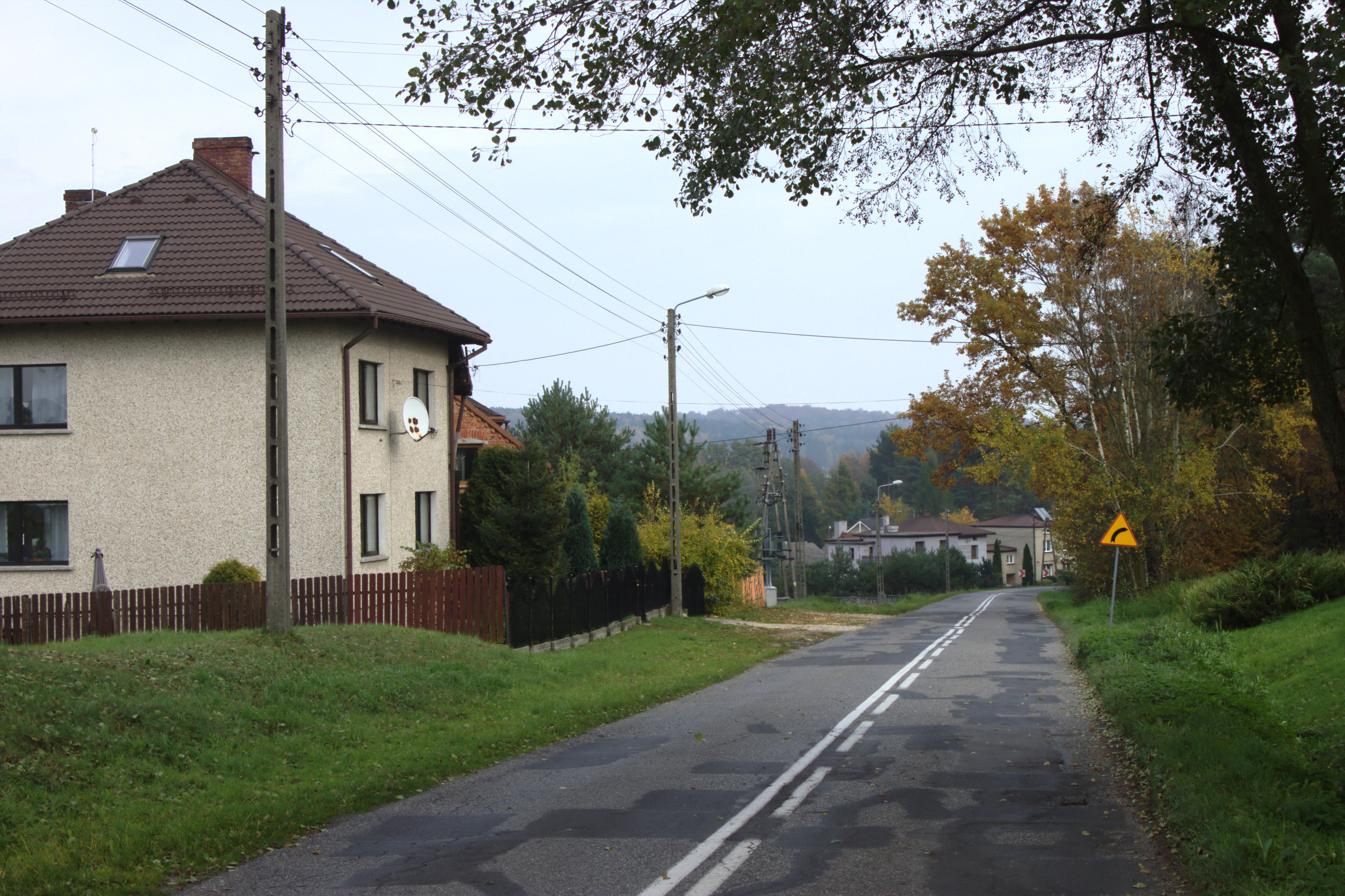
Road in Bogunice

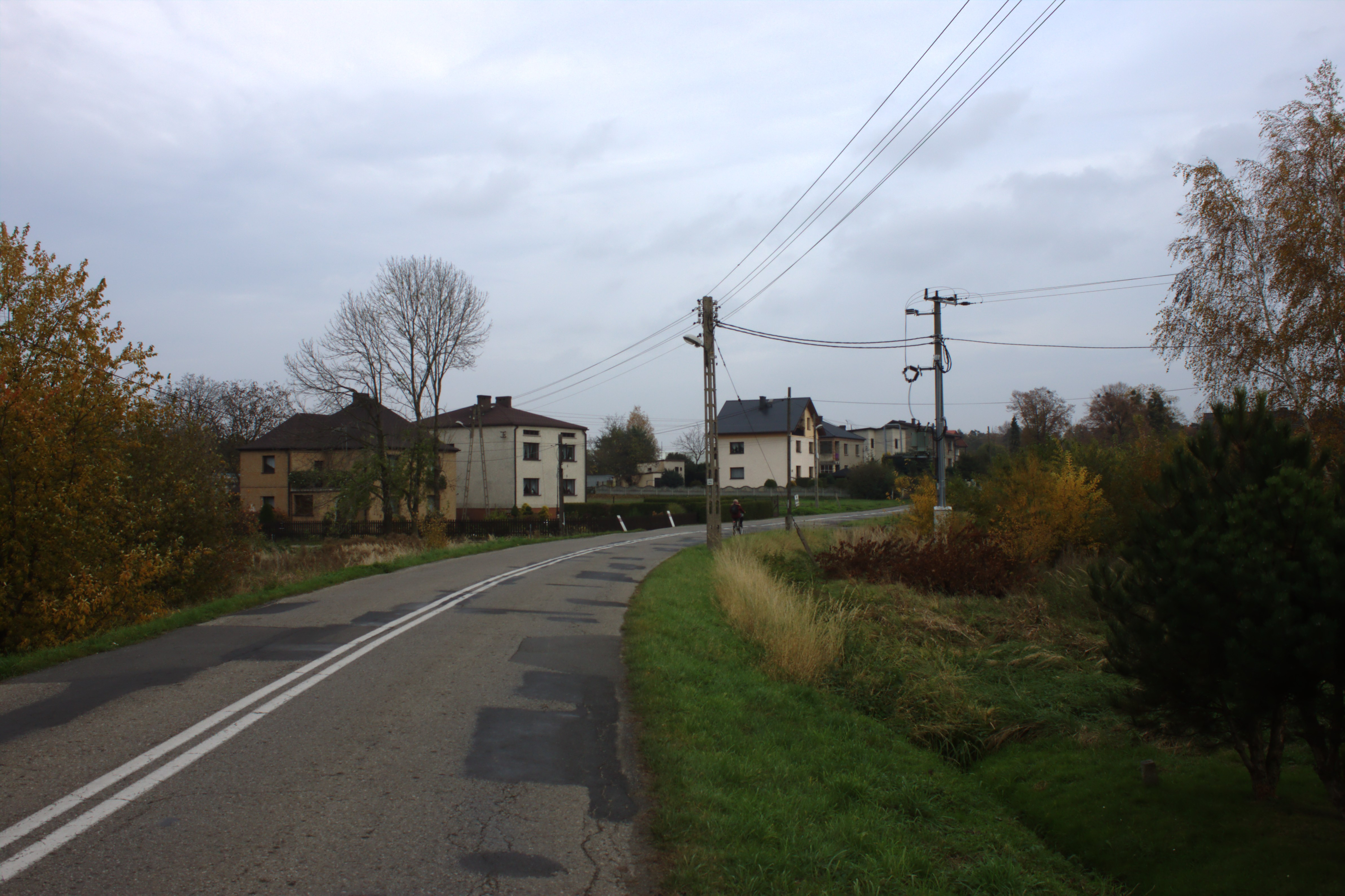
Road in Adamovice

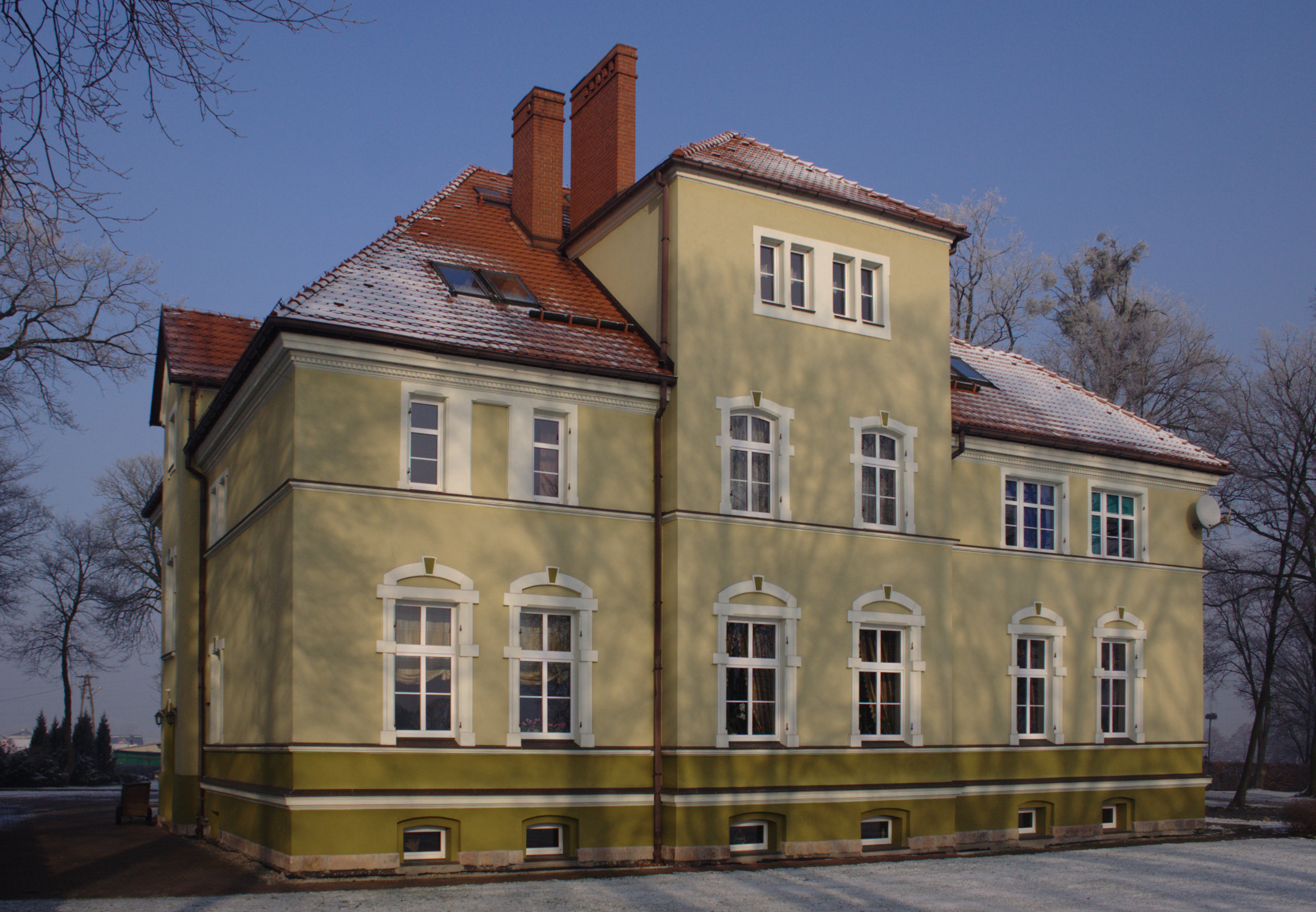
Palace in Dzimierz
