= Water supply in Racibórz =

Polish city

Racibórz was the first city in Upper Silesia to have a water supply system. The first confirmed water supply is considered to be the artificial Psinka canal, mentioned for the first time in 1258. Currently, the city's water supply network spans 235.7 km. The majority of Racibórz uses the municipal network, which is managed by Wodociągi Raciborskie, while only residents of Miedonia use the water supply network of Gmina Rudnik. The water infrastructure in Racibórz is now modern and environmentally friendly, meeting the strictest standards set by the European Union. The city, one of the few in Poland, benefits from three efficient groundwater sources, ensuring that the water delivered to consumers is of high quality and does not require complex treatment processes.

== History ==
The water supply in Racibórz has a long history. The canal dug in the mid-13th century by settlers from the Netherlands is considered the first water supply system in Upper Silesia. In 1564, Ferdinand I granted a privilege allowing the residents of Racibórz to build a water wheel that transferred water to a reservoir functioning as a water tower. This was the first such device in Upper Silesia, and at that time Racibórz was still the only Upper Silesian city with a water supply system. A map of Racibórz from 1831 shows a wooden pipeline bringing water from sources in the Obora Forest. In 1874, the municipal waterworks facility was established. In 1906, a water intake was opened in Studzienna. Subsequent years saw the development of the water supply network. Between 1933 and 1936, a new water tower was built, although it was ultimately not used as intended.

After World War II, the city’s water network was rebuilt under new administration. From 2005 to 2010, with the support of the European Union’s Cohesion Fund, a major project called Water and Wastewater Management in Racibórz was implemented, significantly advancing the city’s water infrastructure.

=== First water supply ===
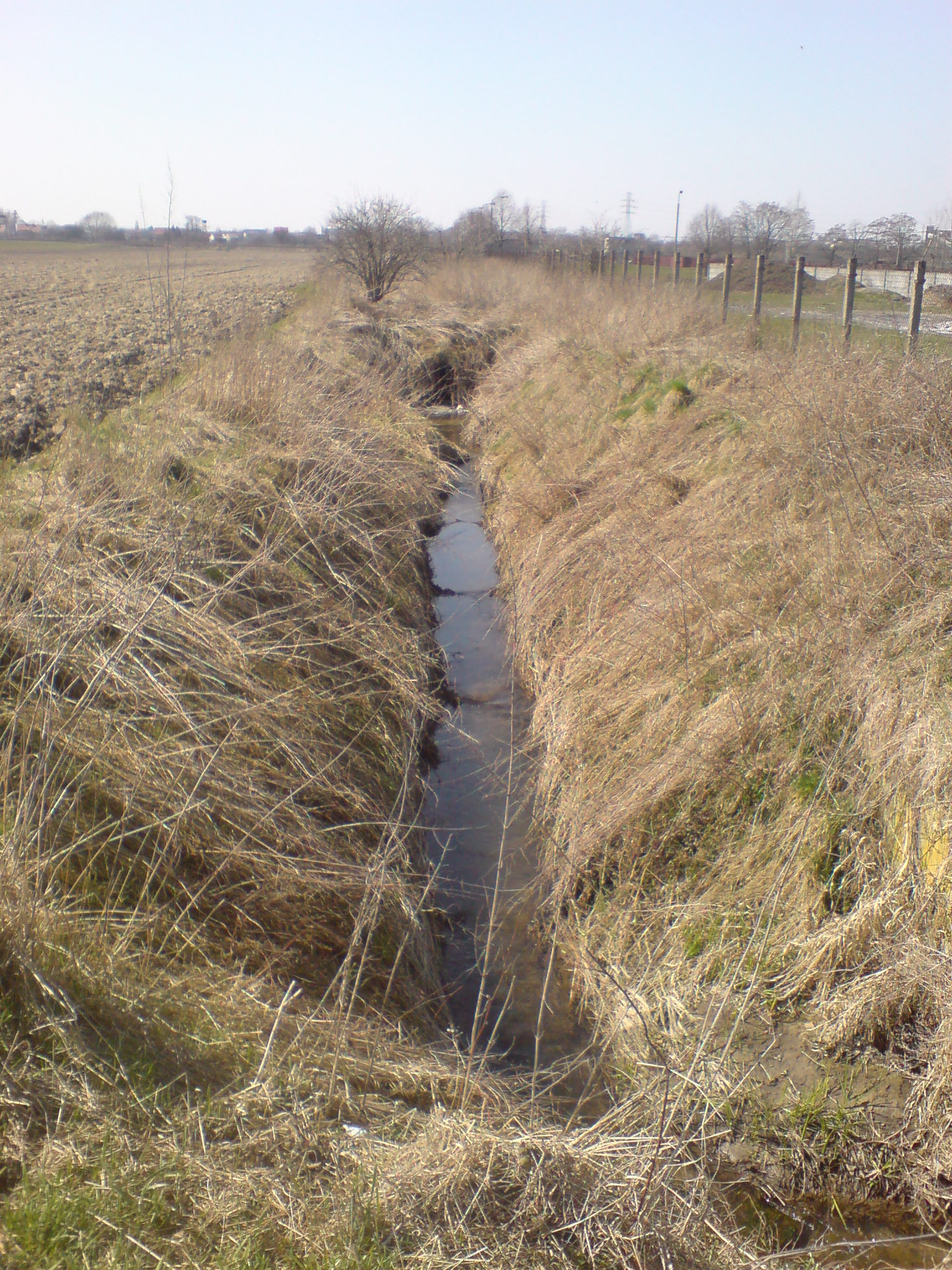
Psinka – the oldest water supply in Upper Silesia – used to flow through the center of Racibórz; today, a part of its former side channel carries water from Studzienna

The residents of Racibórz, first mentioned in 1108, drew water from the Oder river, its mill streams, local brooks, and numerous wells until the early 20th century. An additional supply was also provided by an artificial canal built by Dutch settlers in the mid-13th century (the first mention of it dates back to 1258). This canal, later called Psinka, was 12 km long and was a unique hydraulic engineering solution for its time in Silesia. It started near Bieńkowice, fed by the Psina river, ran parallel to the Oder, irrigating surrounding fields, passed through Racibórz, and emptied into the river. Within modern Racibórz, it ran through Studzienna, then through what is now the neighborhood by Kosmonautów Street, along Polna Street, crossing Opawska and Ocicka streets, later running parallel to Warszawska and Klasztorna streets, turning onto Kasprowicz Street, and ending at Wojska Polskiego Street. A dam and water reservoir were located on the site of the school for the deaf, which could be used for firefighting. Water was also delivered to the city through the Water Gate. At the square at the intersection of Wojska Polskiego and Karol Miarkia streets, there was a pumping station consisting of eight main and six side tanks. Water was pumped into the municipal water supply using a wheel powered by Psinka. The canal then flowed northwest, crossing Stalmach and Londzin streets, reaching the mill of Józef Doms. It was then a short distance to the canal's outlet to the Oder, located near today's Śląska Street.

In Studzienna, a branch of the canal ran through the city center and emptied into the Oder beyond Odrzańska Street. Traces of this branch were found in 1829 during the construction of the school at the site of today's fountain in front of the parish church. This branch likely split before the market square. The second branch probably bypassed the market square from the west and then reconnected with the canal crossing Odrzańska Street. Although it was merely a water ditch, it is recognized as the first confirmed water supply system in Upper Silesia.

In the late 1960s and early 1970s, Psinka within Racibórz was filled in, and its channel was enclosed in sewer pipes. Remnants of the dry ditch are still visible on the southern outskirts of Racibórz. However, the side canal from Studzienna to the sluice area on the Oder remains active, currently carrying water from streams in Studzienna. A 1306 reference mentions a water supply canal fed by the Oder running along the moat, from the mill in Nowe Miasto to Racibórz.

=== Privilege of Emperor Ferdinand ===
On 12 January 1564, Ferdinand I issued a privilege in Vienna allowing the residents of Racibórz to install a water wheel on a mill stream branching off from the Oder river, which transferred water to a reservoir functioning as a water tower. This tower, located on an island separated by the mill stream, was not dismantled until 1815, during the riverbed reconstruction. It was the first device of its kind in Upper Silesia. The castle urbaria from between 1566 and 1567 include information about a tax paid by Racibórz residents for water from the pipelines. Such information is not found in the urbaria of other Upper Silesian cities from this period, indicating that in the mid-16th century, Racibórz was still the only city in Upper Silesia with a water supply system. At that time, a weir on the Oder, near the castle, diverted part of the water to two mill streams. One of these streams supplied the municipal waterworks.

=== Wooden water supply from Obora ===
The exact date of the water intake in the Obora Forest is unknown, but it was mentioned in 1815. Water from this intake was brought to the city via a wooden pipeline that branched before the bridge on the Oder, which was then slightly east of the present Castle Bridge. One branch led to the castle, where it also supplied the Racibórz brewery. The main line crossed the bridge into the city, where it circled around St. Jacob's Church, through Dominikański Square, and reached the market square to the so-called rorkastla.

The rorkastla was a reservoir where water brought by the pipelines collected. It consisted of a well measuring 2.5 × 4 m and 15 cm deep, with two side troughs measuring 1.6 × 1.6 m placed on the east and west sides of the main reservoir. The side walls of the rorkastla were lined with boards, and the bottom was fitted with cobblestones. A two-step staircase led into the reservoir from the southern side. The rorkastla was located in the southern part of the market square, between the Marian column and the present-day Bolko department store. Early 20th-century postcards show a low, ornate column with a water tap at the location of the rorkastla. The exact date of the rorkastla’s construction is unknown, and there are no traces of the former structure today. Remnants of the rorkastla were discovered during excavations in the market square in 1996, suggesting it may have existed in the medieval period.

Two branches of the water supply system ran from the rorkastla. The first headed towards the intersection of today's Nowa and Mickiewicz streets, where it split into two parts. One branch ran along Mickiewicz Street to the former Zborowy Square, where a water reservoir was located; the other led to the New Market (now the northern part of Długosz Square), where there was a water collection point, ending at the former malt house at the intersection of Piwna and Zborowa streets. The second branch ran from the rorkastla through Długa, Browarna, and Solna streets (with a water collection point at the intersection of Solna and Browarna streets), reaching near the current Primary School No. 4. Another water supply began at the square at the intersection of Wojska Polskiego and Karol Miarka streets, where a water pumping station collected water from Psinka. This water was pumped into a pipeline running through Freedom Square to the Wielka Gate, then along a section of Długa Street, Father Ofka Square (where a water reservoir was located), and further along Chopin and Kowalska streets to the former city mill located at the now-defunct Wagi Młyńskiej Street, which once connected Kowalska and Odrzańska streets.

The condition of the city's pipelines was maintained by a pipe master, who, with the help of hired workers and carpenters, performed repairs and inspections.

=== Establishment of the municipal waterworks ===
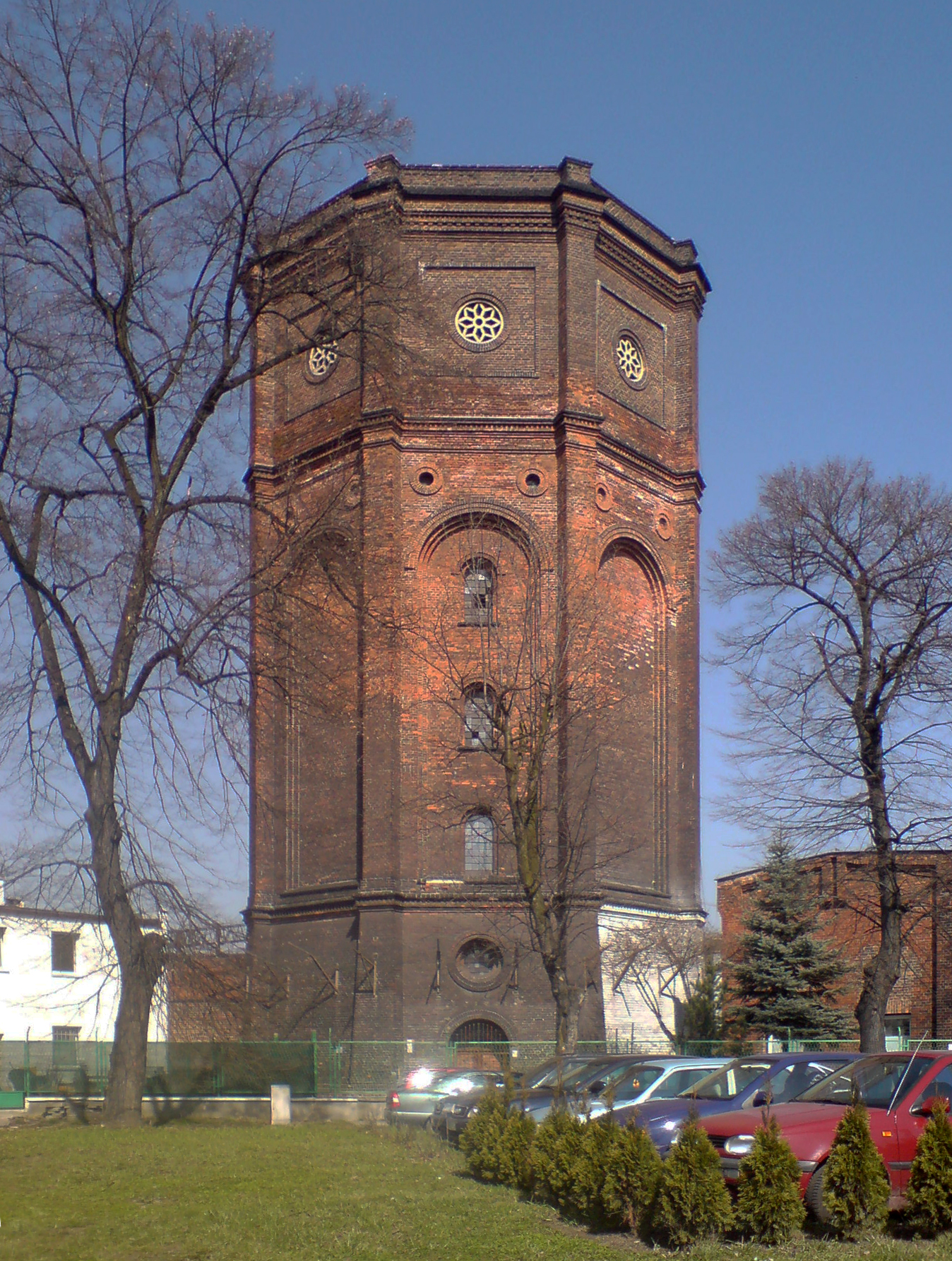
Water tower on 1 Maja Street

The dynamic growth of the city in the 19th century increased the demand for water. To create a municipal waterworks, land and a shooting house were purchased from the shooting fraternity in 1838 on what is now 1 Maja Street. In 1862, additional land was acquired. However, the waterworks was not established until 1874. It included a water pumping station drawing from the Oder river with two pumping units, a filter unit, a clean water reservoir, a clean water pumping station with two steam units, and a water tower with a capacity of 500 m^{3}. (Note: According to the inventory records of the municipal waterworks, the tower was built in 1898; however, this is likely the date of its major renovation.) Previously, there was also the turret clock of the Racibórz prison serving as a water tower, which the correctional facility used for its own purposes.

As the city developed, so did the water supply network. In September 1902, it was decided to extend the pipeline to Stara Wieś. In February 1904, a decision was made to connect Płonia to the water supply. The water supply and gas pipeline were routed via the former bridge along today's Piaskowa Street. (Note: This bridge was blown up in 1945, but a new one was built in its place.) At that time, the water supply also operated in Brzezie, which was still an independent settlement (it was incorporated into Racibórz only in 1975).

The increasing pollution of the Oder prompted city authorities to search for alternative water sources. In 1870, the city purchased several plots in Brzezie with the right to extract water from those areas. However, this initiative was protested by the authorities of Brzezie, who feared a depletion of water resources for the village. The idea of extracting water from sources in Brzezie was revisited in 1895, when water searches were commissioned in the Widok Forest. Further searches began in 1897, but no significant resources were found. In 1904, larger sources were discovered in Studzienna, leading to the initiation of work to establish a new intake.

In 1905, 12 deep wells were dug to a depth of up to 15 m, yielding 6,300 m^{3} of water per day. The area was fenced off. The water was directed to a collection well, which was 12 m deep and 7 m in diameter, and then to the municipal waterworks via a pipeline 2.2 km long. The entire system was put into operation at the end of September 1906. The water resources in Studzienna are of Quaternary origin, with good quality but susceptible to pollution, requiring monitoring and purification.

In 1909, it was decided to include the northern part of Płonia in the water supply network. Construction of the pipeline, running along today’s Bosacka and Fabryczna streets, began in 1912.

=== Interwar period ===
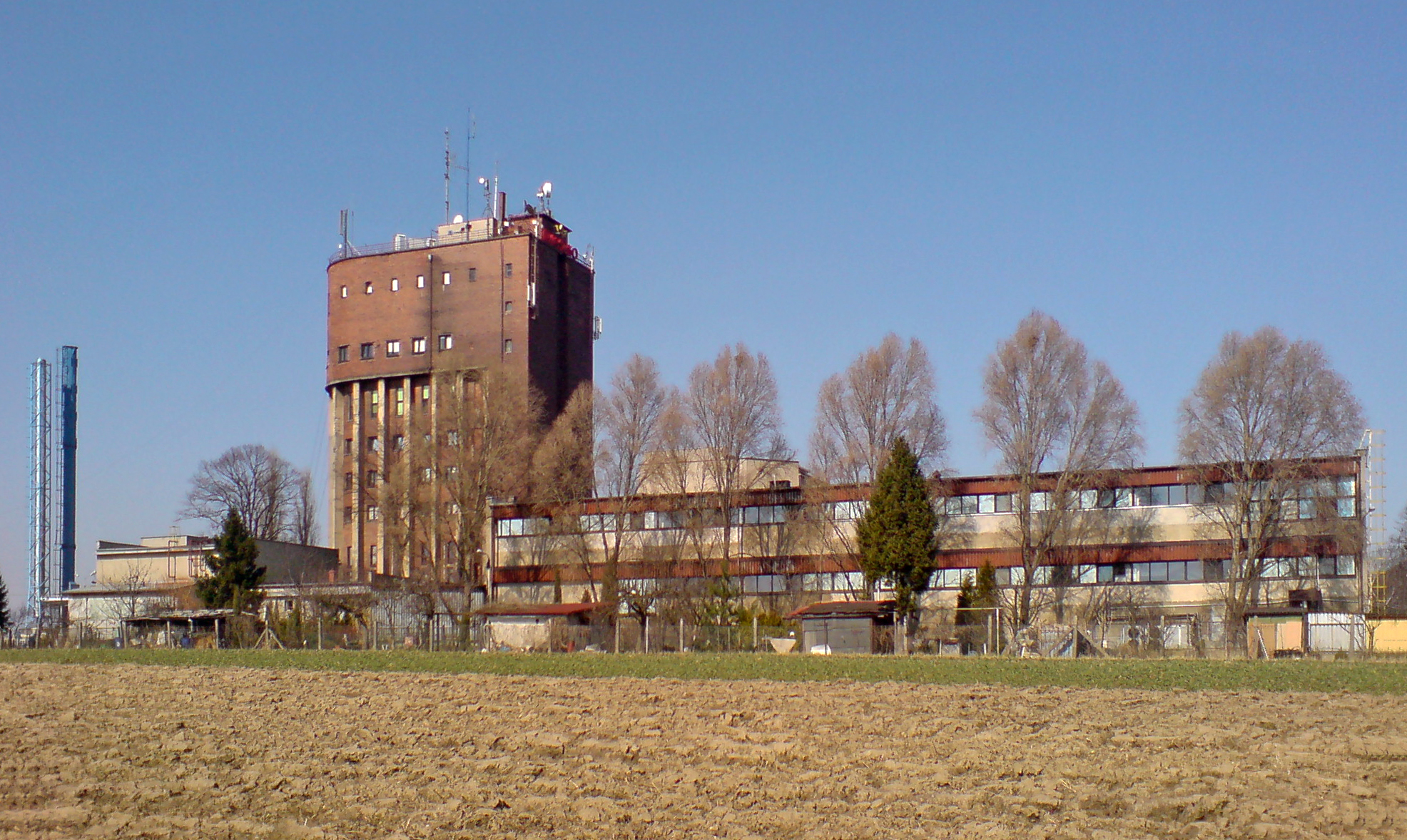
Water tower on Starowiejska Street, now the headquarters of Mieszko factories

Initially, Racibórz's main water consumer was its industry, primarily the railway, which was connected to the waterworks by a dedicated pipeline. However, over time, the existing infrastructure could no longer meet the city's growing needs. Moreover, the existing water tower was unable to supply water to the higher-lying areas of Ocice. As a result, the decision was made to build another water tower on a hill near the present-day Starowiejska Street. Today, this tower houses offices and a production plant for the candy manufacturer, Mieszko.

The tower was designed in 1926 and constructed between 1933 and 1936. It was connected to the waterworks by a three-kilometer pipeline. After its completion, it was discovered that the tower produced excessive water pressure, leading to frequent network breakdowns. Consequently, the tower was used only to supply Ocice with water.

The tower also became a center of Nazi propaganda. The flag of the Third Reich flew atop the tower, and the words Deutschland, Deutschland über alles and the Third Reich’s emblem were emblazoned in large letters on the upper facade. Inside, a pantheon was created with a sarcophagus, surrounded by flags with swastikas. Training facilities were also housed within the building's upper floors. In 1939, just before the outbreak of World War II, a second water tank was built to ensure a steady supply of clean water for the city. This tank had a capacity of 1,000 m^{3}.

=== Municipal waterworks after the transfer of power to Polish administration ===
During World War II, the water supply network in Racibórz was damaged, and some of the waterworks equipment was removed. Despite these challenges, water deliveries were resumed as early as 23 August 1945. However, significant repairs were still needed for the damaged network. In 1946, the districts of Ostróg and Płonia were reconnected to the system, which at that time spanned 62.8 km.

In 1959, two additional wells were opened at the Studzienna water intake. The Obora Forest water source, which had been in use before the war, continued to supply Racibórz brewery and the Obora housing estate that emerged in the early 1960s. Both the brewery and Obora were connected to the city's water system during the construction of a new bridge over the Ulga Canal on Rybnicka Street. The old water pipeline was dismantled, and the Obora water source was abandoned. This had negative consequences for the city brewery, as the water from Obora was particularly well-suited for beer production, contributing to its quality. In 2010, the wells in Obora were revitalized as a historical site and tourist attraction.

Over the years, the water levels at the Studzienna wells significantly decreased, necessitating the installation of a pumping system. In 1970, the shallow wells were decommissioned, as the city faced water shortages and supply interruptions, particularly in the higher-altitude Ocice district. To address this, a hydro-pumping station was built in 1972 to supply Ocice, replacing the temporary system that had been used since the water tower on Starowiejska Street ceased operation after the war.

Between 1972 and 1973, a new pressure pipe was installed, linking the Polish State Railways well, which produced excess water, to the city's waterworks. Around the same time, residents of Studzienna, as part of a community effort, built a local water network that was connected to the municipal system. Shortly afterward, Sudół also received a water supply, completing the city's water coverage. By the end of 1973, the water supply network extended to 88.3 km. Most of the pipes were made of cast iron (69.8 km), with the rest consisting of PVC (9 km), steel (2.4 km), and asbestos-cement pipes (7.1 km). The asbestos-cement pipes were later replaced due to the harmful effects of asbestos.

Also in 1973, approval was granted to tap into water deposits in Sudół, which led to the construction of a new water intake there. On 1 June 1970, a decision was made to add fluoride to the city's water supply to promote dental health. However, this practice is no longer in use today.

In 1976, a well was drilled on Gamowska Street, creating a new water source. Between 1978 and 1982, the Water Treatment Plant on 1 Maja Street was constructed. In 1980, a hydro-pumping station was built on Zakładowa Street, and in 1985, a Water Treatment Plant was established next to the water intake on Gamowska Street.

=== Recent history ===
From 2005 to 2010, a series of investments were made in Racibórz under the project Water and Wastewater Management in Racibórz, largely funded by the Cohesion Fund. This project included modernization of the water supply network in the districts of Brzezie, Sudół, Ostróg, and Stara Wieś, the construction of new pipelines in Brzezie, Ocice, Markowice, and Sudół, modernization of the Gamowska Water Treatment Plant, and the hydro-pumping stations on Magdalena and Zakładowa Streets.

A new hydro-pumping station was also built on Pod Lipami Street, replacing the existing terminal reservoir. A new well was opened at the water intake on Gamowska Street, capable of producing 75 m^{3} per hour. Additionally, the new water intake in Strzybnik comprises five deep wells with a combined capacity of 500 m^{3} per hour. The modernization of the hydro-pumping station on Magdalena Street allowed for the closure of the inefficient Water Treatment Plant and intake in Sudół in June 2007.

== Characteristics ==
=== Water resources in Racibórz and surroundings ===
For many years, the main water source for the residents of Racibórz was the Oder river. However, due to significant pollution, surface waters are now primarily used for industrial purposes. Instead, the water supply comes from three main underground water sources: in Studzienna, on Gamowska Street, and in Strzybnik. Each of these sources is located in a different hydrological zone.

Racibórz is situated within areas classified as the Main Groundwater Reservoirs No. 332 Subniecka Kędzierzyńsko-Głubczycka and No. 352 Racibórz. The underground waters in the city originate from the Tertiary and Quaternary geological periods. The intake in Studzienna is located within the Racibórz erosion trough, which stretches along the western edge of the city from Sudół to Rudnik. The water from this source comes from the Quaternary layer, with deposits found approximately 50 meters below the surface. This zone also includes the water intake belonging to the Mieszko company, the intake in Kietrz, and several smaller intakes, such as those for the Dairy Cooperative and Prodryn. While the waters from this zone meet drinking water standards, elevated iron levels necessitate regular monitoring and purification.

The intake on Gamowska Street draws water from sandy and gravelly Tertiary and Quaternary formations. This water is of average quality and requires iron removal. The Strzybnik intake sources its water from Quaternary and Tertiary underground layers located from 50 to 60 meters below the ground. These resources are of very good quality and have low susceptibility to pollution. The zone where this intake is located represents a significant depression in the impermeable layer of the Tertiary formations.

In the past, water was also sourced from the spring in Obora, and numerous wells existed throughout the city. Today, some industrial facilities maintain their own water sources.

=== Infrastructure ===
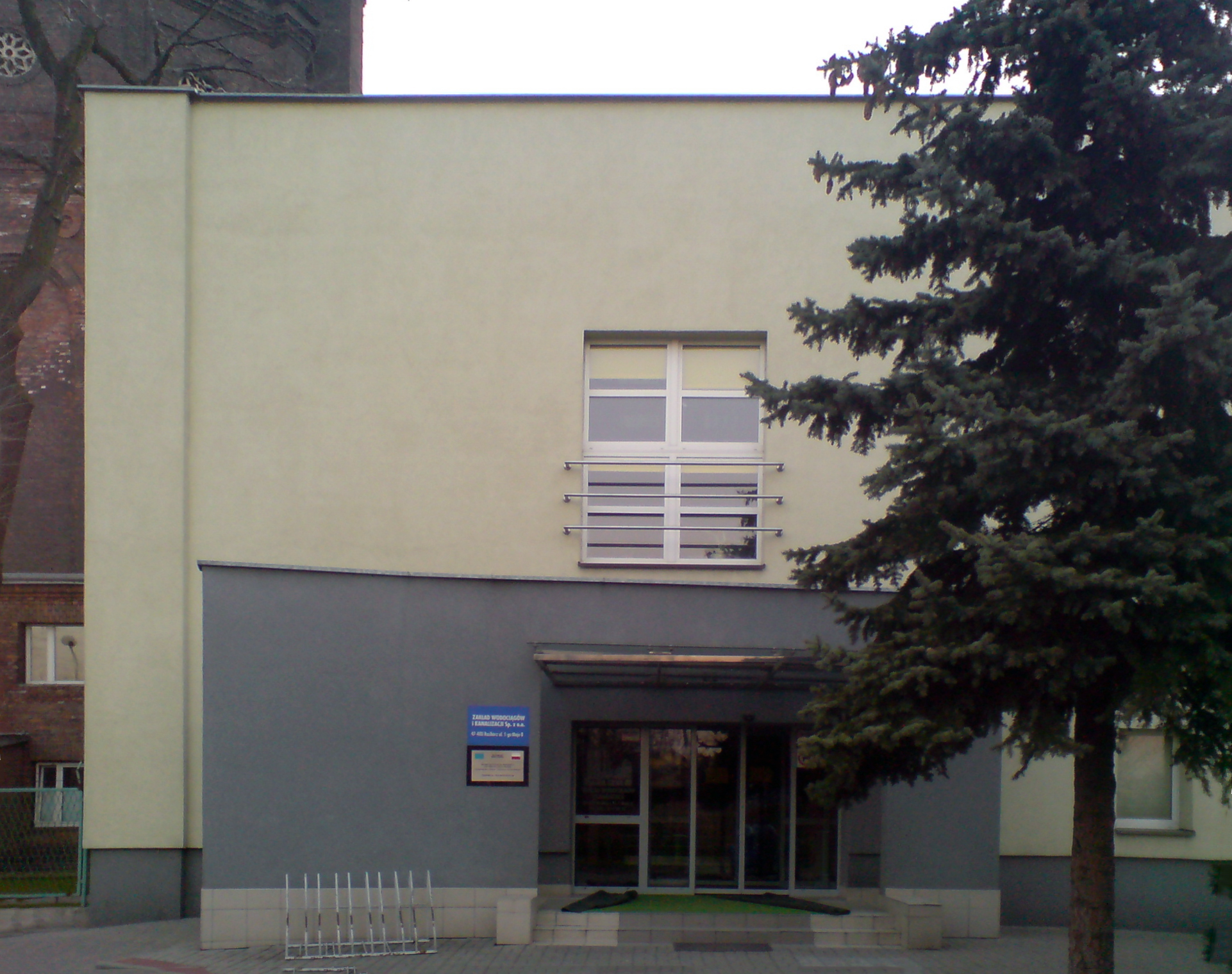
Administrative building of the Water and Sewage Company on 1 Maja Street

The municipal water supply system sources its water from three underground intakes: in Studzienna, on Gamowska Street, and in Strzybnik. The water is treated at two Water Treatment Stations located on Gamowska Street and 1 Maja Street, which also houses the administrative offices of the Racibórz Water and Sewage Company, the producer and distributor of water.

The water supply network is circular with few branches, totaling 235.7 km in length. This includes 12.8 km of main pipelines with diameters of between 300 and 400 mm, 144.5 km of distribution networks with diameters of between 80 and 250 mm, and the remainder (78.4 km) are connections to buildings, totaling 4,283 connections. There are six pumping stations located at Brzeska Street, the road from Markowice to Obora, Magdalena, Zakładowa, Jagielnia, and Pod Lipami streets, which boost water pressure. Additionally, there are three water towers on Magdalena, Zakładowa, and Pod Lipami streets. Water from the municipal network also reaches Pogrzebień and Kornowac at an average of 180 m^{3} per day.

Characteristics of exploited underground water sources:

- Studzienna water intake: located on Bogumińska Street, established in 1905 and connected to the municipal water supply in 1906. It currently has 9 wells, of which 7 are operational, 1 is reserved, and 1 is damaged. Well depths range from 51 to 56 m, with a total output of 480 m³ per hour.
- Gamowska water intake: comprises two deep wells, drilled in 1976 and 2006, at depths of 85 and 70 m. The output of this intake is 160 m³ per hour, with the older well equipped with a submersible pump at a depth of 45 m.
- Strzybnik water intake: Built between 2007 and 2009 and operational since 15 September 2009. It consists of 5 deep wells ranging from 95 to 125 m deep, with a total output of 500 m³ per hour.

Description of operating Water Treatment Stations:

- Water Treatment Station on 1 Maja Street: constructed between 1978 and 1982. The maximum output of the station is 833 m³ of water per hour. It consists of an aeration tower, five open rapid filters, two filled with quartz gravel of granulation of between 3 and 5 mm, and three with anthracite-quartz gravel placed on a gravel bed of anthracite granulation of between 2 and 4 mm, two filter flushing pumps with an output of between 570 and 720 m³ of water per hour and a power of 30 kW, a chlorination unit, three active treated water tanks with a total capacity of 5,800 m³, a secondary pumping station, main and technological pipelines, and control and measurement apparatus.
- Water Treatment Station on Gamowska Street: established in 1985. The maximum output of the station is 100 m³ of water per hour. It consists of two reaction tanks with a diameter of 1,800 mm and a height of 3.7 m equipped with injector aeration on the inflow armature, four pressure rapid filters with a dual-layer quartz-pyrolusite gravel with a diameter of 3,000 mm, three treated water tanks with a diameter of 12 m and a capacity of 500 m³ each, and two pumping sets, one serving the municipal network with an output of 275 m³ of water per hour at an input pressure of 2.8 bar and 200 m³ of water per hour at an input pressure of 4 bar, the other serving the hospital on Gamowska Street with an output of 39 m³ of water per hour at an input pressure of 4 bar, as well as a chlorination unit.

Main water pipelines in Racibórz:

- Two pipelines transporting water from the Studzienna intake to the Water Treatment Station on 1 Maja Street, each 3 km long – one made of cast iron (500 mm diameter) built from 1921 to 1923, and the other of polyethylene (400 mm diameter) built from 1972 to 1973.
- A pipeline connecting the unused water tower on Starowiejska Street with the Water Treatment Station on 1 Maja Street, constructed from 1920 to 1922, made of cast iron (400 mm diameter, 2.5 km long).
- A pipeline from the Strzybnik intake to Starowiejska Street, connecting to the 400 mm main pipeline, completed in 2009 (6 km long, 400 mm diameter, polyethylene).
- A pipeline connecting the Water Treatment Station on Gamowska Street with Cegielniana Street, made of cast iron (0.735 km long, 250 mm diameter).
- A pipeline connecting Cegielniana Street with Armii Krajowej Street, comprising a 2.165 km section of PVC pipes (315 mm diameter) and two steel pipes (each 120 m long, 150 mm diameter).
- A branch from the 400 mm main pipeline from 1 Maja Street to Piaskowa Street, measuring 1.050 km in length (300 mm diameter, cast iron).

=== Quality of water supplied by the waterworks ===
The water reaching consumers in Racibórz is of good quality and is subject to constant monitoring. In 2009, isolated cases of exceeding permissible levels of turbidity, iron concentration, nickel, total bacterial colony counts grown at 36 °C after 48 hours and at 22 °C after 72 hours, as well as the presence of coliform bacteria, Escherichia coli, and Enterococci were recorded. However, these instances were short-lived, allowing for a clear conclusion that the water distributed in Racibórz is safe for health and suitable for consumption; furthermore, it does not require chlorination, which is done only sporadically for preventive purposes. In samples taken from the water supply network of the Rudnik municipality, used by the residents of Miedon, the presence of coliform bacteria was detected several times in 2009, and once Enterococcus faecalis were found. The detection of Enterococcus faecalis led to a ban on drinking water in Modzurów in June, but the water for Miedon residents was safe throughout the year. At the same time, the existing ecological and modern infrastructure, including having three efficient deep-water sources – one of the few cities in Poland with such a feature – ensures a supply of clean water for the residents of Racibórz. The average daily water production in Racibórz in 2009 was 8,900 m^{3} per day. The price for 1 m^{3} of water in Racibórz as of 1 January 2011 was 3.62 PLN.

== Bibliography ==
- Newerla, Paweł (2008). Dzieje Raciborza i jego dzielnic [The history of Racibórz and its districts] (in Polish). Racibórz: Wydawnictwo i Agencja Informacyjna WAW. ISBN 978-83-89802-73-6.
- Wawoczny, Grzegorz (2010). Gospodarka wodno-ściekowa w Raciborzu [Water and wastewater management in Racibórz] (in Polish). Racibórz: Wydawnictwo i Agencja Informacyjna WAW. ISBN 978-83-89802-98-9.
