= Euphemia of Racibórz =

Polish princess (died 1359)

Servant of God Eufemia of Racibórz OP
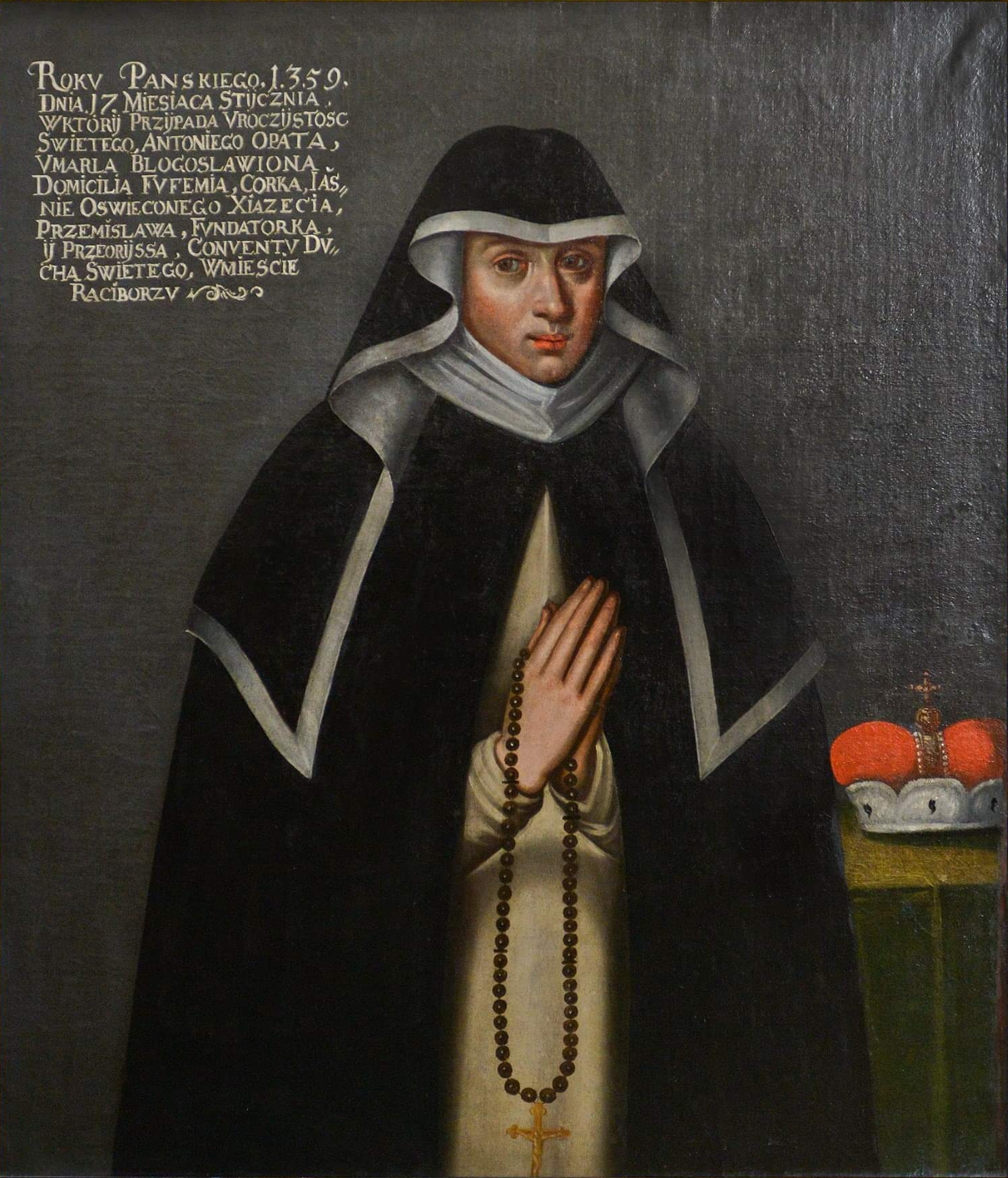
- Born: ca. 1299
- Died: 17 January 1359; Raciborz, Poland

Euphemia of Racibórz, OP (Polish: Eufemia raciborska) (1299/1301 – 17 January 1359) was a Dominican prioress in Racibórz who was a former Polish princess of the House of Piast in the Racibórz branch.

== Life ==
Euphemia was the third child but second daughter of Duke Przemysław of Racibórz by his wife Anna, daughter of Konrad II of Masovia.

On 9 April 1313 Euphemia took the veil and entered the Dominican monastery of the Holy Spirit in Racibórz. During her religious life, she was elected prioress twice, in 1341 and during 1358–1359. Documents showed her as a person who dutifully cared for increasing the monastery holdings. In 1313, she acquired the villages of Proszowiec, Markowice, Lyski, Pogrzebień and Lubomia from her brother, Duke Leszek of Racibórz. In 1335 Euphemia give to Nankier, Bishop of Wrocław the villages of Bieńkowice, Strzybnik, Sudoł and Kornowac as a Tithe. In 1337, she bought villages of Ligota and Izoldy to the widow of Piotr Strali, and in 1339 the village of Ucieszków and half of Warmutowice in Koźle to a certain Kunada Stosz (or Stoszowice).

In 1340 the Dominican order through Euphemia bought from Henryk z Plumowa and his brother Jeszka the town of Baborów and the villages of Suwałków, Czerwięcice and Dzielów. Three years later (in 1343) Euphemia received from her brother-in-law, Duke Nicholas II of Opawa-Racibórz, a large piece of land in Bieńkowice as her personal fief, but by 1351, the whole of Bieńkowice was again in possession of the Dominican order. At that time, Euphemia acted again as a representative of the Dominican Order and sold the villages of Bieniek, Turc and Kobern as the new Tithe given to the Church.

On 2 July 1345, Euphemia was authorized by Pope Clement VI to maintain all further acquisitions made by her on behalf of the Dominicans under her direct control. The church and monastery of the Holy Spirit, which were built and consecrated on 29 September 1334, became the center of the religious and cultural life in Racibórz.

On 8 December 1358 the dying Euphemia redacted an extensive will, in which were listed all the goods acquired by her. She died a few weeks later, on 17 January 1359 and was buried in the Dominican Chapel of Saint Dominic in the monastery of Racibórz.

== Veneration ==
The later hagiography emphasized Euphemia's devout life, full of self-denial and plenty of Christian virtues.

At the beginning of the 19th century, her remains were solemnly moved to the chapel and deposited in the principal Church in one of the side altars. During the fire at the church in 1945, the altar burned down and Euphemia's relics were lost. Today she is deeply venerated in Racibórz. In January 2022, her beatification process was opened.
