= Gmina Kornowac =

Gmina Kornowac Kornowac Commune
- Gmina
- Coat of arms
- Interactive map of Gmina Kornowac
- Coordinates (Kornowac): 50°4′22″N 18°19′9″E
- Country: Poland
- Voivodeship: Silesian
- County: Racibórz
- Seat: Kornowac

Area
  - Total: 26.3 km^{2} (10.2 sq mi)

Population (2019-06-30)
  - Total: 5,190
  - Density: 197/km^{2} (511/sq mi)
- Website: http://kornowac.pl/

Gmina Kornowac is a rural gmina (administrative district) in Racibórz County, Silesian Voivodeship, in southern Poland. Its seat is the village of Kornowac, which lies approximately 7 kilometres (4 mi) east of Racibórz and 53 km (33 mi) west of the regional capital Katowice.

The gmina covers an area of 26.3 square kilometres (10.2 sq mi), and as of 2019, its total population was 5,190.

== Villages ==
Gmina Kornowac contains the villages and settlements of Kobyla, Kornowac, Łańce, Pogrzebień and Rzuchów.

== Neighbouring gminas ==
Gmina Kornowac is bordered by the towns of Pszów and Racibórz, and by the gminas of Lubomia and Lyski.

== Twin towns – sister cities ==
Gmina Kornowac is twinned with:

- Branka u Opavy, Czech Republic
- Vřesina, Czech Republic
