= Population of Racibórz =

In the 14th century, Racibórz was one of the most populous cities in Upper Silesia. However, over time, its population remained relatively stable, and the city began to lose its significance. Only in the past two centuries has Racibórz seen significant population growth, but it has not regained its former prominence due to the parallel growth of other cities.

== History ==
The first mention of Racibórz dates back to 1108, but the population of the city during that period is difficult to determine. By the mid-14th century, Racibórz had around 3,100 inhabitants, making it one of the most populous cities in Upper Silesia. It had a similar population at the end of the 18th century. Since the 19th century, the population gradually increased, and by the end of the century, over 21,000 people lived in the city. In the 20th century, population growth was further amplified by the incorporation of neighboring towns into the city's borders. By the early 20th century, the population surpassed 30,000, and Racibórz became an urban county. In the late 1920s and early 1930s, the population reached 50,000. However, in the 1930s, there was no further population growth, and the number even began to decrease. Despite this, Racibórz remained one of the important urban centers in Upper Silesia. From 1924 to 1938, although Opole was the capital of the Province of Upper Silesia, Racibórz hosted the regional parliament (Landtag).

At the end of World War II, Racibórz had only around 3,000 inhabitants, but by a year and a half later, the population had grown to almost 20,000, and by the late 1950s, it surpassed 30,000. Over the following years, Racibórz continued to increase in population, peaking in 1991 at 65,300 residents. Despite this growth, the city gradually lost importance in the region, partly due to the rapid expansion of cities in the Upper Silesian Industrial Region and the formation of the Rybnik Coal Area in the 1960s.

Between 1950 and 1975, when Racibórz was still part of Opole Voivodeship, it was the second-largest city in the province, after Opole. Since 1991, the population has declined. According to data from 31 December 2009, the population stood at 56,484, ranking 81st in Poland by population size. According to demographic projections by Statistics Poland, the population will continue to decrease, falling below 50,000 after 2015, and reaching 41,115 by 2030.

== Population ==
The earliest traces of human settlements in the area of present-day Racibórz date back to the period before the penultimate Riss glaciation. These traces come from Studzienna and are dated to between 240,000 and 180,000 BC. Additionally, findings from later prehistoric periods have been discovered, including traces of settlements. Further evidence comes from the Early Middle Ages, when a defensive settlement of the Golensizi tribe existed on the Ostróg hill.

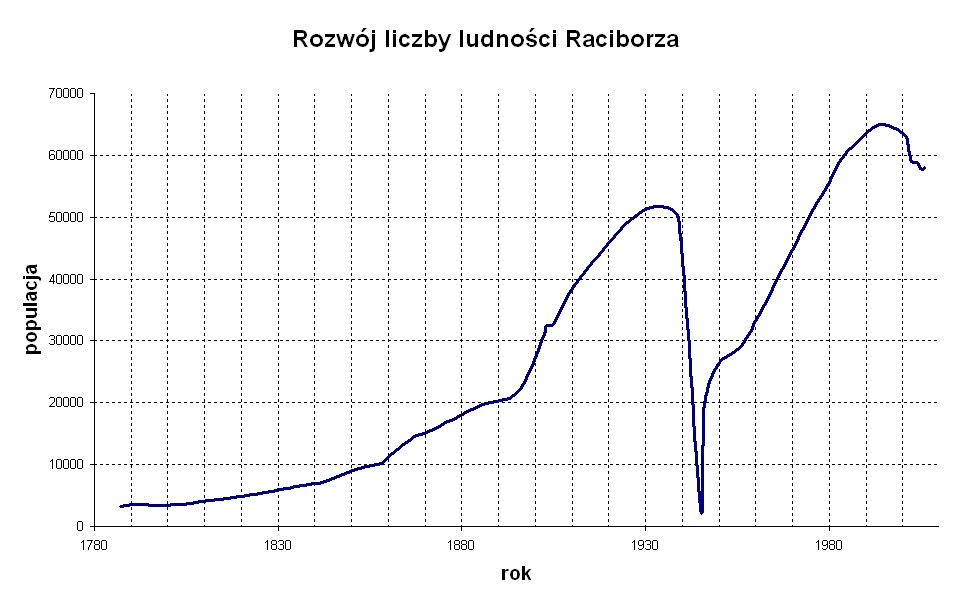
Demographic development since 1787

=== Population of Racibórz from the city's origins to the 19th century ===
The first mention of Racibórz dates back to 1108. The population during the city's early years is difficult to determine. The growth of the population was influenced by both natural increase and the influx of people. However, wars, diseases, fires, and other natural disasters caused fluctuations in the population. According to estimates based on Peter's Pence, in 1329 Racibórz had 2,348 inhabitants, and by 1337, this number had risen to 2,882, making it one of the most populous cities in Upper Silesia at the time. In the mid-14th century, it is estimated that Racibórz, including its suburbs, had about 3,100 residents. At that time, it was confined to the city walls, although from 1307 it included a small settlement, New Town (Rybaki), which grew near the Oder Gate.

Information from the 16th century indicates an economic decline, leading to a reduction in population. In 1532, Racibórz had 288 houses, 229 of which belonged to citizens, 12 to the nobility, 10 to the clergy, and 37 were vacant. The city's growth was also hindered by fires that plagued Racibórz between 1546 and 1574. At the beginning of the 17th century, the population numbered around 3,300, but by the end of the first half of the 18th century, it had fallen to around 2,700. By the end of the 18th century, Racibórz had 259 bourgeois houses.

Population of Racibórz from 1749 to 1945
Year	Total population	Catholics	Protestants	Other Christians	Jews	Men	Women
1749	1,577						
1772	2,530						
1787	3,272	3,255			17	1,391	1,881
1790	3,596						
1791	3,511						
1793	3,629						
1800	3,457						
1818	4,655						
1825	5,315						
1840	7,022	5,154	1,155		713	3,341	3,680
1842	7,102						
1852	9,384						
1855	9,962						
1858	10,226						
1861	11,794	8,854	1,826		1,114		
1867	14,571						
1871	15,322	11,883	2,220	10	1,209	7,867	7,455
1885	19,524	15,131	3,075	1	1,317	9,747	9,777
1895	21,680	17,113	3,538	6	1,021	10,582	11,098
1900	25,250						
1902	30,398						
1903	32,500						
1905	32,690	27,718	4,138	9	823	15,392	17,298
1910	38,424	33,613	4,014				
1925	49,076						
1927	49,076						
1933	51,680	47,368	3,573	7	563		
1939	50,004	45,640	3,403	42	289		

In 1749, the city had a population of 1,577 inhabitants. By 1772, the population grew to 2,530 people. The earliest official data from 1787 reports 3,272 residents, including 3,255 Christians and 17 Jews. Among the Christians, there were 30 members of the nobility, 12 of whom were men. Of the Christian population, 7 were exempt from military service due to their short stature (below 5 feet, or approximately 157 cm), 107 were foreigners, 43 were unfit for service, 65 were exempted by privilege, and 1,824 were women. By 1790, the population reached 3,596. Other data from the late 18th century indicates that in 1791, the city had 3,511 residents, and by 1793, the population grew to 3,629. In 1795, the population decreased to 3,081.

=== Population of Racibórz in the 19th century ===
In 1800, the population of Racibórz was 3,457. At that time, the city was enclosed within its city walls. By 1840, the population had risen to 7,022, including 5,154 Catholics, 1,155 Protestants, and 713 Jews. The number of marriages was 880, with 3,342 men (47.6% of the population) and 3,680 women (52.4% of the population). In 1842, the city's population was 7,102. By 1849, the number had grown to 8,499, and in 1852, it reached 9,384. Additional data from 1858 and 1861 shows that the population exceeded 10,000 for the first time, reaching 10,226 in 1858 and 11,794 in 1861. This significant increase was due to the inclusion of the village of Nowe Zagrody, with a population of 1,455, into the city in 1860. On 3 December 1867, Racibórz had 14,571 residents.

On 1 December 1871, a census was conducted in the Kingdom of Prussia, which also covered Racibórz. According to the data, the city had 724 residential buildings, housing 2,579 families and 241 single individuals. The total population was 15,322, with 7,867 men (51.3%) and 7,455 women (48.7%). Only 5,777 (37.7%) people were born in Racibórz. The religious composition was as follows: 11,883 (77.6%) Catholics, 2,220 (14.5%) Protestants, 10 other Christians, and 1,209 (7.9%) Jews. In terms of education, 2,943 (19.2%) were children under 10, 10,986 (71.7%) were literate, 250 (1.6%) did not provide educational information, and 1,143 (7.5%) were illiterate. The city had 13 blind people, 113 deaf people, 24 mentally disabled individuals, and 150 people with other disabilities.

On 1 December 1885, another census was conducted, showing a population of 19,524, a 27.4% increase over the previous 14 years. Of this, 9,747 (49.9%) were men and 9,777 (50.1%) were women. The city was home to 3,075 (15.8%) Protestants, 15,131 (77.5%) Catholics, 1 other Christian, and 1,317 (6.7%) Jews. Racibórz had 818 residential buildings, housing 3,786 households. On 2 December 1895, the next census recorded 21,680 residents, including 10,582 (48.8%) men and 11,098 (51.2%) women. The religious composition included 3,538 (16.4%) Protestants, 17,113 (78.9%) Catholics, 6 other Christians, and 1,021 (4.7%) Jews.

=== Population of Racibórz between 1900 and 1945 ===
Population of Racibórz from 1945 onward
Year	Population	Men	Women	Population density
1945	~3,000			
1946	19,605			
1950	26,447			
1955	29,903			
1957	29,830	16,266	13,564	
1960	32,523			
1961	33,900			
1962	34,600			
1963	35,500			
1964	36,100			
1965	36,561			
1966	37,000			
1967	38,500			
1968	39,400			
1969	40,200			
1970	40,600			
1971	40,643			
1972	41,300			
1973	42,200			
1974	45,338			
1975	45,913	23,934	26,359	671
1976	46,200			
1977	50,800			
1978	51,400			
1979	52,900			
1980	55,532	26,803	28,729	741
1981	57,182			
1982	57,973			
1983	58,805			
1984	59,819	28,965	30,854	798
1985	61,011			
1986	61,773			
1987	62,493			
1988	61,791			
1989	62,833			
1990	64,394			
1991	65,300			
1992	64,327			
1993	64,875	31,189	33,686	865
1994	65,071			
1995	65,041	31,310	33,731	867.7
1996	64,961	31 ,47	33,614	866.6
1997	64,523	31,119	33,404	860.8
1998	64,273	30,962	33,311	857.4
1999	64,093	29,095	31,646	855.0
2000	63,484	28,770	31,362	846.9
2001	62.964	28.545	31.067	840.0
2002	59,290	28,357	30,933	793.7
2003	58,778	28,106	30,672	784.1
2004	58,310	27,773	30,537	777.9
2005	57,755	27,452	30,303	770.5
2006	57,170	27,121	30,049	762.2
2007	56,919	26,976	29,943	758.8
2008	56,727	26,969	29,758	756.3
2009	56,484	26,842	29,642	753.0
2010	56,397	26,779	29,618	752.0
2015	55,547	26,472	29,075	740.5

In 1900, the city expanded its borders to include Bosacz, which had 944 inhabitants in 1895, and in 1902, it also incorporated Stara Wieś and Proszowiec, which had 4,105 and 807 inhabitants, respectively. The total population of Racibórz reached 30,398. On 1 April 1903, Racibórz became a city district with 32,500 inhabitants, covering an area of 15.49 km².

On 1 December 1905, a census was conducted, revealing that there were 1,404 residential houses and 29 other inhabited buildings, huts, tents, carts, and other dwellings. At that time, Racibórz had 6,256 multi-person households and 721 single-person households. The population reached 32,690, with 15,996 men (including 604 soldiers) and 16,694 women. In terms of religious affiliation, there were 27,718 Catholics, 4,138 Protestants, 9 other Christians, 823 Jews, and 2 people of other faiths. The census also collected data on declared native languages. Of the total, 21,195 people declared German as their native language, including 16,297 Catholics, 2,090 Protestants, and 808 Jews. A total of 9,892 people declared Polish as their native language, including 22 Protestants. Other languages were declared by 513 people, of whom 438 spoke Moravian, including 13 Protestants. 1,077 residents considered both German and another language as their native tongue. On 1 April 1910, Płonia was incorporated into the city, which increased the population of Racibórz to 38,424. Before the outbreak of World War I, the population had reached 38,600.

On 20 March 1921, the Upper Silesia plebiscite was held, with 24,675 out of 25,836 eligible voters participating. Of those, 2,227 (9%) voted for Poland, and 22,291 (90.4%) voted for Germany. As a result of the plebiscite and the Silesian Uprisings, an area of 437 ha, including the municipal forest Widok, the area around the Bismarck Tower, and the farm in Brzezie, became part of Poland. However, all these areas remained the property of the city council.

By 1925, the population had reached 41,000. In 1927, Racibórz had 49,076 inhabitants, and by 1933, the population had grown to 51,680. This significant increase was due to the incorporation of Ostróg, Studzienna, the estate areas, and Ocice into the city on 5 January 1927. Racibórz expanded its area by 1,787.4 hectares, inhabited by 8,108 people, bringing the total area to 4,286 ha.

On 17 May 1939, the population was 49,724, a decrease of 1,656 people compared to the previous 6 years.

=== Population of Racibórz since 1945 ===
In May 1945, the city had a population of about 3,000 people. By the end of the year, the population had risen to over 23,000, including 13,145 Poles, 10,000 Germans, 87 Czechs, 18 Jews, and 32 people of other origins. There were also 4,435 repatriates from the eastern Polish lands. By the end of 1946, the population reached 19,605.

In December 1950, the population was 26,447. 45% of the increase in population between 1950 and 1955, which amounted to almost 4,000 people, was made up of incoming migrants. By 1957, Racibórz had 29,830 inhabitants, including 13,564 (45.5%) men and 16,266 (54.5%) women.

On 27 May 1975, Brzezie nad Odrą was incorporated into the city, with a population of 2,900. By the end of 1975, Racibórz had 50,293 residents, including 23,934 men and 26,359 women. There were 110.1 women for every 100 men, and the population density was 671 people per square kilometer. On 1 February 1977, Ocice Górne, with 235 people, Sudół with 110 residents, as well as Markowice and Miedonia, were also incorporated. On 31 December 1980, the population reached 55,532, including 26,803 men and 28,739 women. The population density was 741 people per square kilometer, and there were 107.2 women for every 100 men.

In 1984, Racibórz had 59,819 inhabitants, including 28,965 men and 30,854 women. The population density was 798 people per square kilometer, and there were 106.5 women for every 100 men.

In 1991, the city reached its highest recorded population of 65,300. On 31 December 1993, Racibórz had 64,875 residents, including 31,189 men and 33,686 women. There were 108 women for every 100 men. In 1993, the population included 6,372 (9.8%) children under 6 years old, 13,310 (20.5%) youth aged 7–17, 1,927 (3%) youth aged 18–19, 29,322 (45.2%) people of working age (20–49), 9,362 (14.4%) people aged 50–64, and 4,578 (7%) retirees. The population density was 865 people per square kilometer.

In 2002, the city had 60,162 residents, in 2003 there were 59,466, and in 2004, the population was 58,817. Data from 2006 showed 57,987 inhabitants, and by the end of 2008, the population had decreased to 56,727. According to data from 31 December 2009, the population was 56,484, ranking Racibórz 81st in terms of city population in Poland. By 31 December 2010, the population was 56,397.

== Area of the city ==
It is estimated that in the 14th century, the city, located in the bend of the Oder river, covered an area of approximately 19 hectares.

The first expansion of the city to include a nearby village occurred in 1860 when Nowe Zagrody was incorporated. In 1885, the area of Racibórz was 5.95 km², and by 1895, it slightly decreased to 5.932 km².

In 1900, the village of Bosacz was added to the city, followed by Stara Wieś and Proszowiec in 1902. On 1 April 1903, the city, now covering 15.43 km², became a district town. On 1 April 1910, the village and estate area of Płonia were incorporated, increasing the area to 22.24 km².

On 20 March 1921, following the plebiscite, the city lost 4.37 km² and was left with an area of 17.87 km². On 5 January 1927, several villages, including Ostróg and Studzienna, as well as estate districts such as Racibórz-Zamek, Ocice-Zamek, Studzienna, Stara Wieś, and Proszowiec, were incorporated, adding a total of 14.99 km². The area of Racibórz then totaled 32.86 km².

In 1975, the village of Brzezie was incorporated into the city. On 1 July 1975, as part of administrative reform, Racibórz lost its status as a city separate from the county. On 1 February 1977, the villages of Markowice, Miedonia, Ocice Górne, and Sudół were incorporated. By 1980, the area of the city was 74.96 km².

In 1995, the city still covered 74.96 km². On 1 July 1999, Racibórz did not take the opportunity to become a district town and remained part of Racibórz County. By 2006, the area had increased to 75.01 km², likely due to updates to the land records system.

== Bibliography ==
- Newerla, Paweł (2008). Dzieje Raciborza i jego dzielnic [The History of Racibórz and Its Districts] (in Polish). Racibórz: WAW. ISBN 978-83-89802-73-6.
- Nowara, Alojzy (1975). "Zarys Dziejów Raciborskiego" [Outline of the History of Racibórz]. In Hawranek, Franciszek (ed.). Wypisy do Dziejów Raciborskiego [Excerpts from the History of Racibórz] (in Polish). Opole: Instytut Śląski w Opolu.
- Kantyka, Jan, ed. (1981). Racibórz: Zarys rozwoju miasta [Racibórz: Outline of the City's Development] (in Polish). Katowice: Śląsk. ISBN 83-216-0140-5.
