= Rzuchów, Silesian Voivodeship =

Rzuchów
- Village
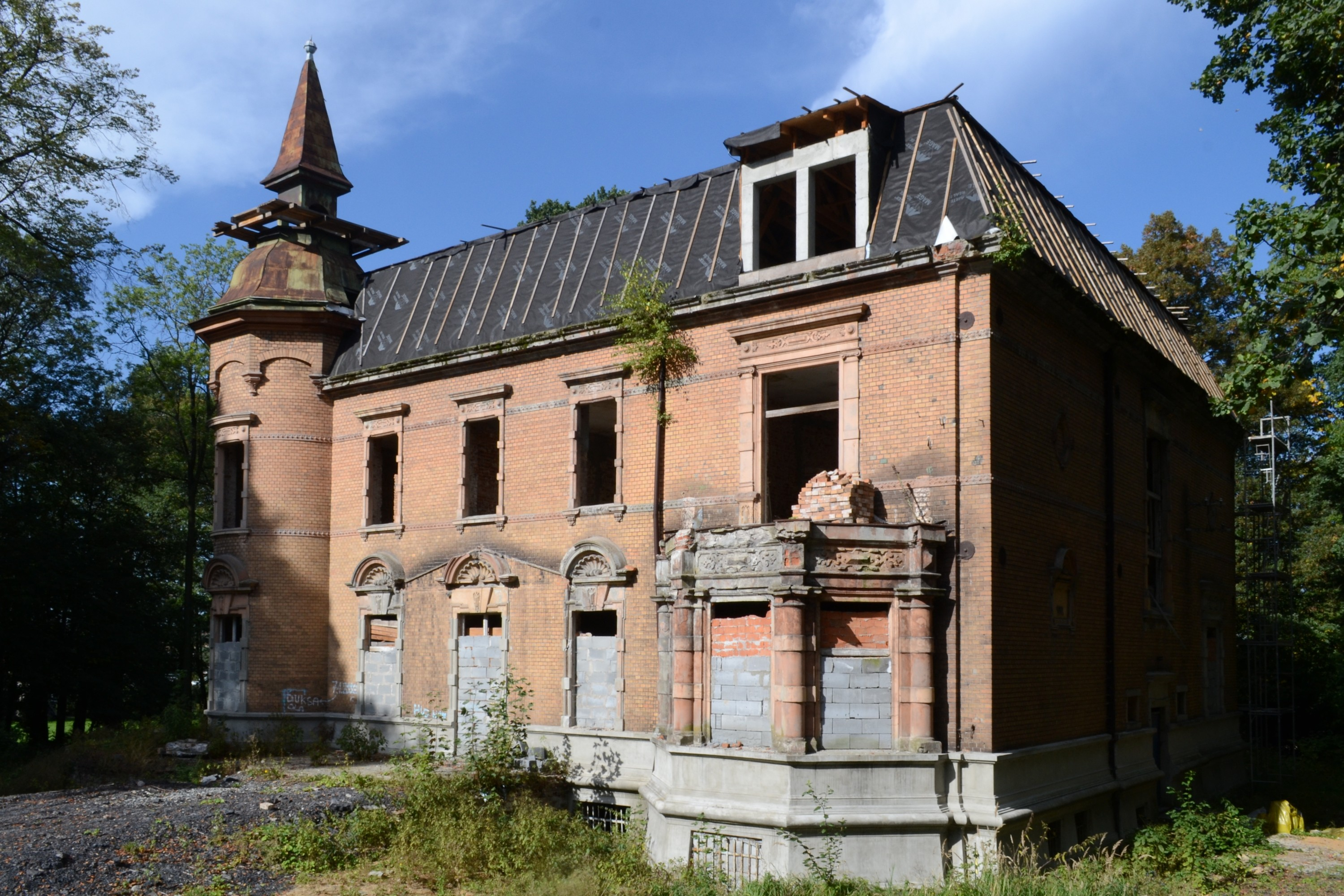
- Palace in Rzuchów

- Location within Poland
- Coordinates: 50°3′52″N 18°21′51″E
- Country: Poland
- Voivodeship: Silesian
- County: Racibórz
- Gmina: Kornowac

Population
  - Total: 1,000

Rzuchów [ˈʐuxuf] is a village in the administrative district of Gmina Kornowac, within Racibórz County, Silesian Voivodeship, in southern Poland.
