= Racibórz =

City in Silesian Voivodeship, Poland

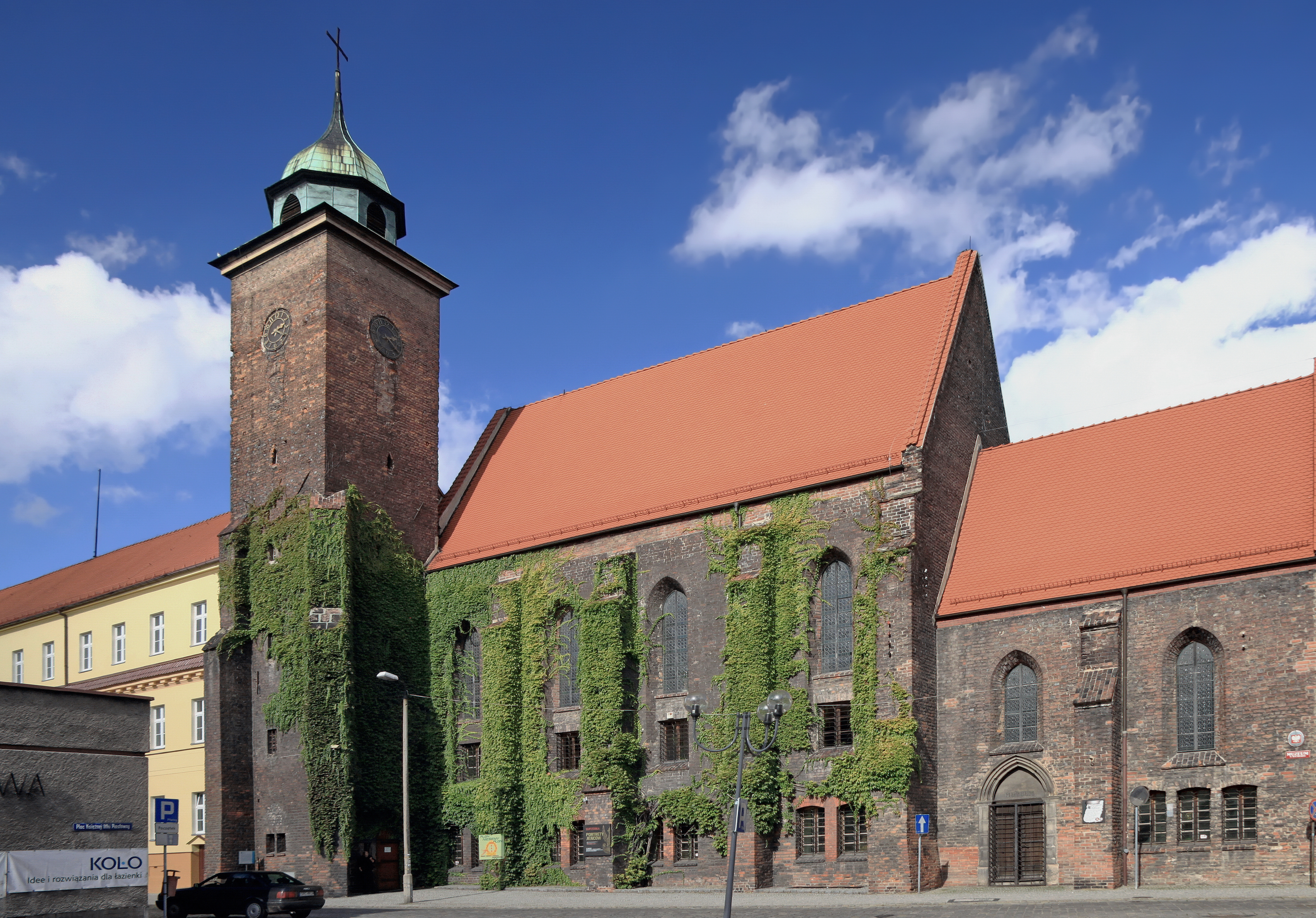
- Former Holy Spirit Church, now a museum, 14th century

- Flag Coat of arms

- Location within Silesian Voivodeship Location within Poland
- Coordinates: 50°5′N 18°14′E
- Country: Poland
- Voivodeship: Silesian
- County: Racibórz
- Gmina: Racibórz (urban gmina)
- First mentioned: 845 or 1108
- City rights: 1217

Government
  - City Mayor: Jacek Wojciechowicz

Area
  - Total: 74.96 km^{2} (28.94 sq mi)

Population (31 December 2021)
  - Total: 53,632 ▼
  - Density: 715.5/km^{2} (1,853/sq mi)
- Time zone: UTC+1 (CET)
  - Summer (DST): UTC+2 (CEST)
- Postal code: 47-400 to 47-445
- Area code: +48 32
- Car plates: SRC
- Website: www.raciborz.pl

Racibórz (pronounced [raˈt͡ɕibuʂ], German: Ratibor, Czech: Ratiboř) is a city in Silesian Voivodeship in southern Poland. It is the administrative seat of Racibórz County.

With Opole, Racibórz is one of the historic capitals of Upper Silesia, being the residence of the Dukes of Racibórz from 1172 to 1521.

== Geography ==
The city is situated in the southwest of the voivodeship on the upper Oder river, near the border with the Polish Opole Voivodeship and the Czech Republic. The Racibórz Basin (Kotlina Raciborska) forms the southeastern extension of the Silesian Lowlands, surrounded by the Opawskie Mountains in the west (part of the Eastern Sudetes), the Silesian Upland in the north, and the Moravian Gate in the south. The town centre is located about 75 kilometres (47 mi) southwest of Katowice and about 160 kilometres (99 mi) southeast of the regional capital Wrocław.

As of 2019, the city has a population of approximately 55,000 inhabitants. From 1975 to 1998, it belonged to Katowice Voivodeship.

== History ==
The area was inhabited by the Old Polish tribe of Silesians. The town is one of the oldest in Upper Silesia, the site of a hill fort where the old trade route from the Moravian Gate down to Kraków crossed the Oder river. There is a possibility that Racibórz was mentioned in a work of the "Bavarian Geographer" in 845 (this document mentions five strongholds of the Slavic Golensizi, a proto-Polish tribe, probably Racibórz was one of them). The name Racibórz is of Slavic origin and probably is derived from the name of one Duke Racibor, the city's founder.

=== Middle Ages ===
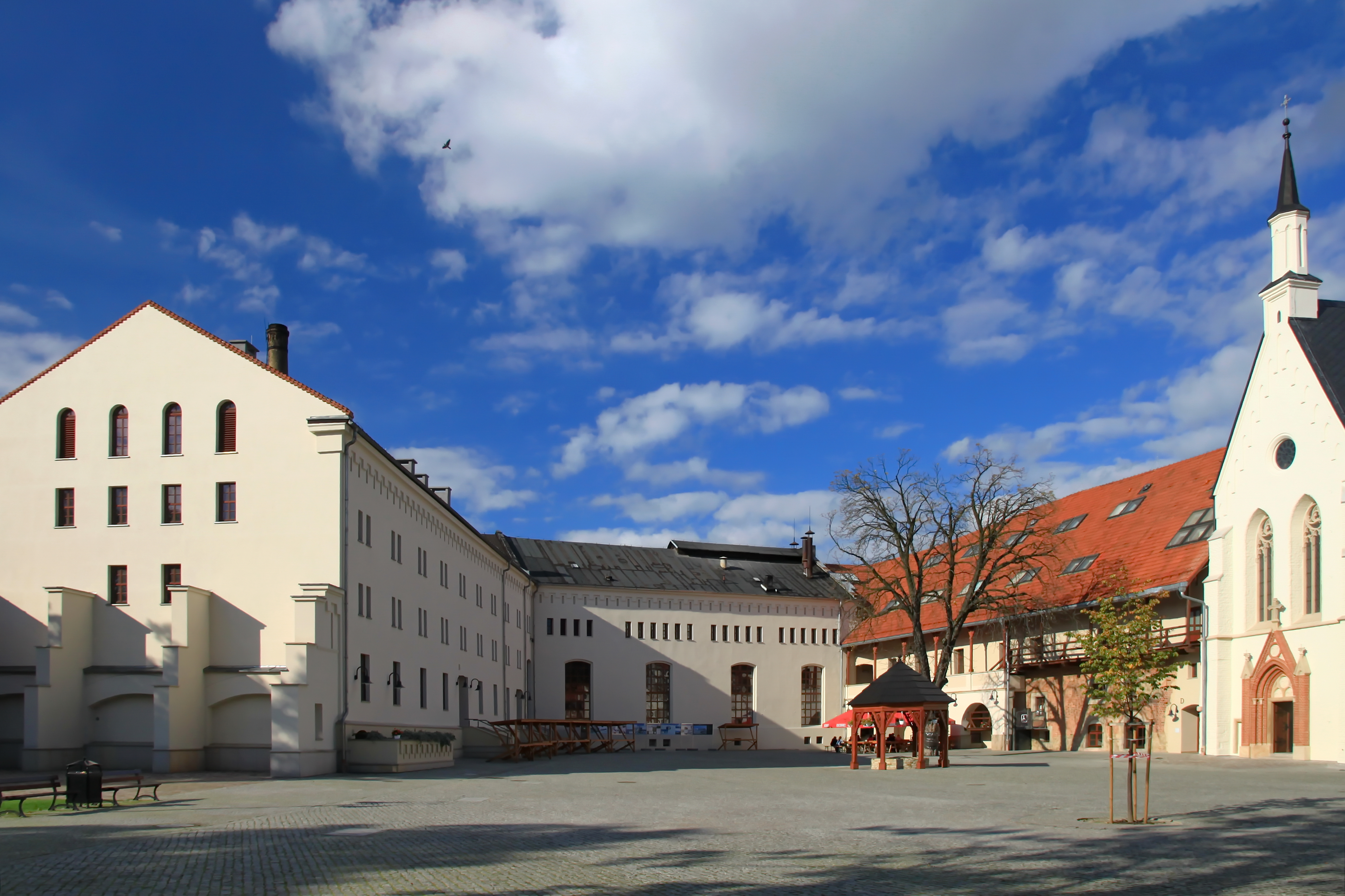
Racibórz Castle

However, the first confirmed mention of Racibórz was made in 1108 in the Gesta principum Polonorum chronicle by the Benedictine monk Gallus Anonymus, at a time when the Polish duke Bolesław III Wrymouth had to ward off the attacks by the forces of Duke Svatopluk of Bohemia invading from the Moravian lands in the south. The Polish rule over the Racibórz area was confirmed in 1137, it became part of the newly formed Duchy of Silesia, a provincial duchy of Poland, according to the Testament of Bolesław III in the following year.

Racibórz was an important center of beer production, and the townspeople enjoyed a privilege that allowed brewing already in the early 12th century. Brewing was an important source of the town's income, and local beer was popular not only in Silesia, but also in neighboring Czechia.

From 1155, Racibórz was the seat of a castellany. The town became the first historical capital of Upper Silesia, when the Duchy of Racibórz was established by the Piast duke Mieszko I Tanglefoot upon the first partition of Silesia in 1172. From 1202 onwards, Duke Mieszko ruled over whole Upper Silesia as Duke of Opole and Racibórz. He had the settlement beneath his residence laid out and the area colonized by Flemish merchants, the first coin with the Polish description "MILOST" was issued in Racibórz in 1211. Mieszko's son and successor Duke Casimir I granted the Racibórz citizens municipal privileges in 1217.

In 1241, the Poles led by local Duke Mieszko II the Fat won the Battle of Racibórz during the first Mongol invasion of Poland and the Duke founded a Dominican monastery in the city, where he was buried in 1246. The first Polish national anthem Gaude Mater Polonia was written ca. 1260–70 in Latin by the Dominican brother Wincenty of Kielcza. In 1285 Duke Przemysław of Racibórz granted the Wrocław bishop Thomas II Zaremba asylum during his fierce struggle with the Silesian duke Henry IV Probus. In turn, Bishop Thomas donated a college of canons at Racibórz Castle, dedicated to Saint Thomas of Canterbury. Duke Przemysław also founded a Dominican nunnery and his daughter Euphemia became its first prioress in 1313. Around 1300, the Dominican friar Peregrine of Opole compiled his Sermones de tempore and Sermones de sanctis collections.

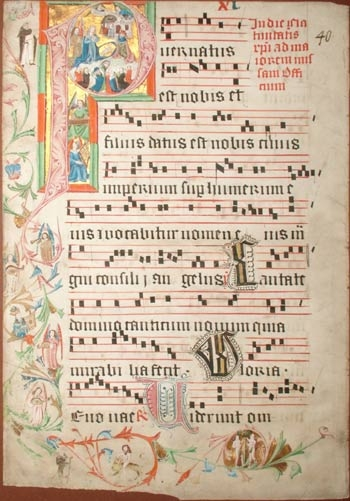
Gradual of Racibórz (Graduał raciborski)

From 1299 onwards, Racibórz was ruled by an autonomous city council according to Magdeburg town law. When in 1327 Duke Leszek of Racibórz paid homage to the Luxembourg king John of Bohemia, his duchy became a Bohemian fiefdom. The Bohemian feudal suzerainty, confirmed in the 1335 Treaty of Trentschin, led to the seizure of Racibórz as a reverted fief, when the line of the Silesian Piasts became extinct upon Duke Leszek's death in 1336. The next year King John enfeoffed Leszek's brother-in-law Duke Nicholas II of Opava with the duchy, which from that time on was ruled by the Opava cadet branch of the Bohemian Přemyslid dynasty and incorporated into the Lands of the Bohemian Crown. The Racibórz citizens retained their autonomy and the town developed to an important commercial centre for the region with significant cloth, tanning and brewing industries.

=== Modern Era ===
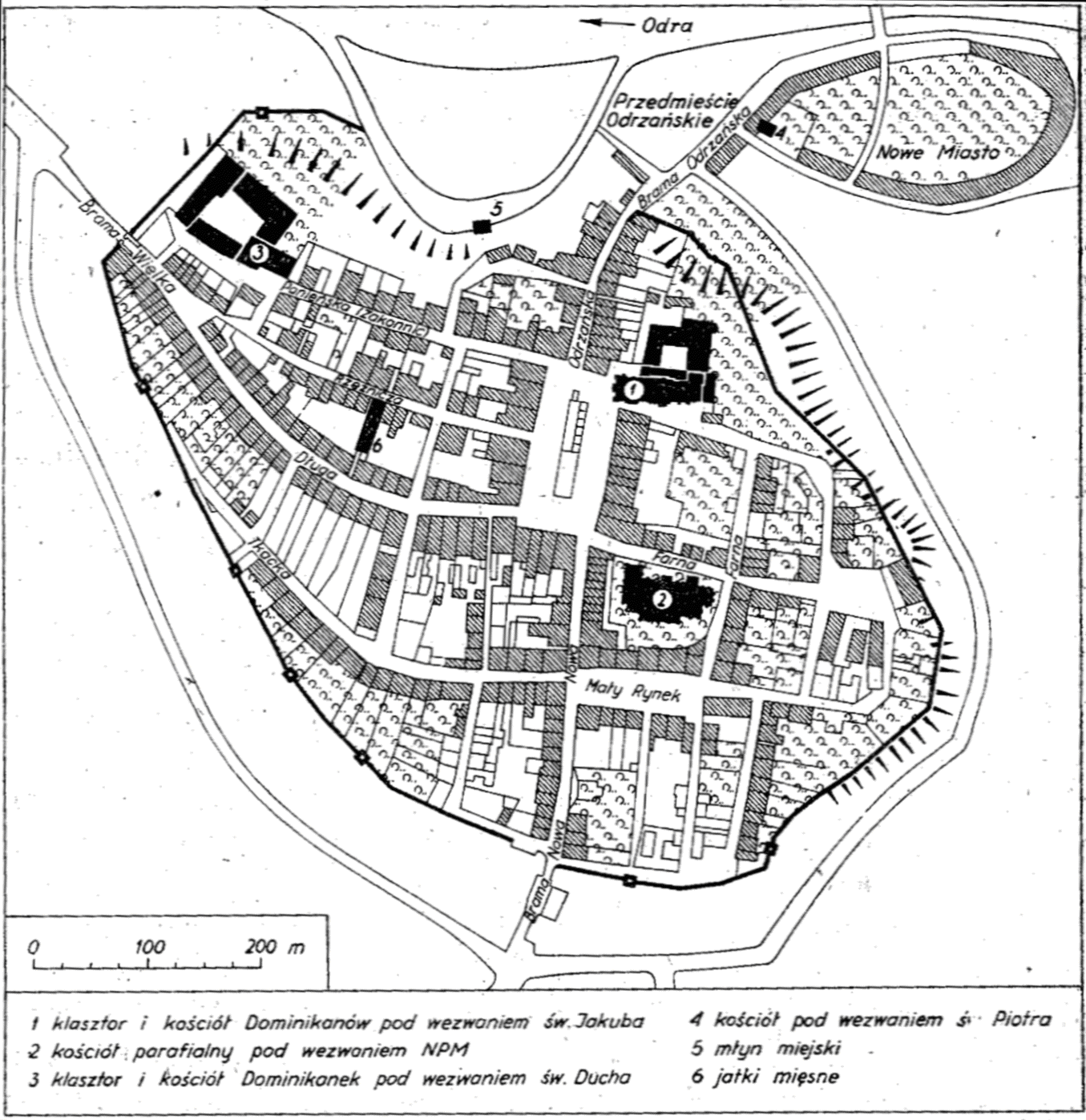
Contemporary map of 16th-century Racibórz

When the last Přemyslid duke Valentin died and was buried in the Dominican church in 1521, Racibórz according to a 1512 inheritance treaty fell to the Opole dukes Jan II the Good, also a vassal of Bohemian king. As he himself left no male heirs, his lands fell back to the Habsburg king Ferdinand I. With Opole, Racibórz was temporarily given in pawn to the Hohenzollern margraves of Ansbach and to the royal Polish House of Vasa. The town's economy suffered from the devastations in the Thirty Years' War. In 1683, on his way to the Battle of Vienna, Polish King John III Sobieski stopped in Racibórz, which he called a beautiful and fortified town in a letter to his wife Queen Marie Casimire.

After the First Silesian War in 1742, Racibórz was ceded to the Kingdom of Prussia under Frederick the Great. With most of the Silesian territory it was incorporated into the Province of Silesia in 1815 and the town became the administrative seat of a Landkreis. In the 18th century, Racibórz belonged to the tax inspection region of Prudnik. The mediate Lordship of Ratibor was acquired by Elector William I of Hesse in 1812, succeeded by Landgrave Victor Amadeus of Hesse-Rotenburg in 1821 and Prince Victor of Hohenlohe-Schillingsfürst in 1834, who was vested with the title of a "Duke of Ratibor" by King Frederick William IV of Prussia in 1840. At that time, Ratibor had already lost its status as a residential town, while the princes held court in Rudy Palace in Rudy (then officially Groß Rauden). In the 19th century, Prussian policies increased the Germanisation. During the Revolutions of 1848, it was the site of joint Polish-German demonstrations. Poles smuggled large amounts of gunpowder through the town to the Russian Partition of Poland during the January Uprising in 1863. Ratibor became part of the German Empire in 1871.

=== 20th century ===
According to the Prussian census of 1910, the city of Ratibor had a population of 38,424, of which around 60% spoke German, 30% spoke Polish and 10% were bilingual. Another source states that Poles comprised 43% of the population. Local Poles took part in the Polish Silesian Uprisings against Germany. After World War I, the Upper Silesian plebiscite was held in 1921, in which 90.9% of votes in Ratibor town were for Germany and 9.1% were for Poland. Consequently, the town remained in Germany, as part of the Prussian Province of Upper Silesia, and became a border town, while the present-day district of Brzezie, lying east of the Oder was reintegrated with Poland.

Nazi Germany increasingly persecuted local Polish activists since 1937. In May 1939, the Germans searched the local branch of the Union of Poles in Germany and arrested both its secretary Leon Czogała and Ludwika Linderówna, activist of the local Association of Polish Women. In June 1939, the Gestapo seized the headquarters of local Polish organizations, which was then handed over to the Hitler Youth, while the Polish library and documents were confiscated.

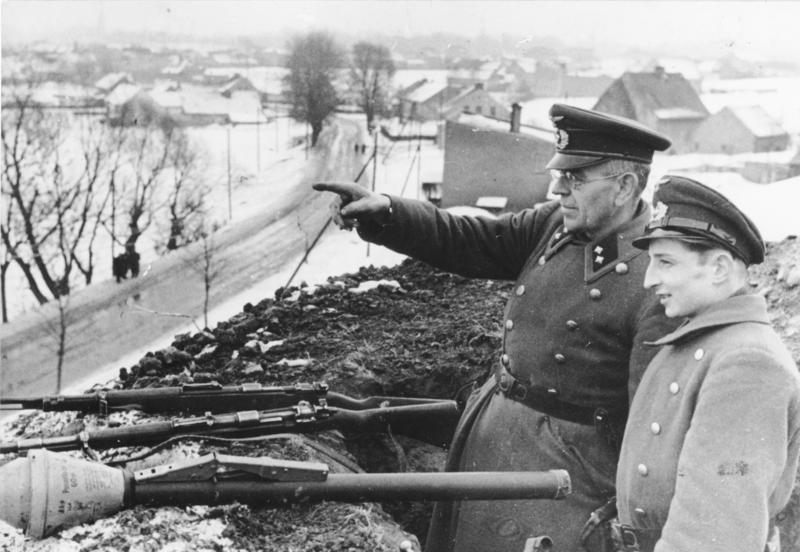
Volkssturm troops in the town in 1945

During the German invasion of Poland, which started World War II, the Einsatzgruppe I entered the town on September 4, 1939, to commit atrocities against Poles. In September 1939, the Germans confiscated assets of the local Polish bank, and carried out mass arrests of prominent Poles, including the chairman of the local "Sokół" Polish Gymnastic Society, the editor-in-chief of local Polish newspaper Dziennik Raciborski, the chairman of the local Polish bank and activists of the Association of Polish Women. During the war, the Germans operated a Nazi prison, a Polenlager forced labour camp for Poles, a forced labour camp for Jews, and six labour subcamps of the Stalag VIII-B/344 prisoner-of-war camp in the town, and three labour subcamps of Stalag VIII-B/344 in the present-day district of Brzezie. The Polish resistance burned down a German arms factory. In 1945, the Germans sent 176 prisoners of the Nazi prison on a death march to Kłodzko, and two German-conducted death marches of prisoners of the Auschwitz concentration camp and its subcamps passed through the town towards the Gross-Rosen concentration camp and Opava. In the final stages of the war, it was initially spared by the Red Army Vistula–Oder Offensive but occupied and devastated on 30 March 1945. After end of the war, in June 1945, the army of Czechoslovakia briefly entered into the town and Czechoslovakia officially claimed the area of Racibórz and Głubczyce (Ratibořsko and Hlubčicko) because of having a substantial Czech minority (see border conflicts between Poland and Czechoslovakia). At the same time the expulsion of Germans started, while the town became wholly part of Poland as defined at the Potsdam Conference. The German CDU politician Herbert Hupka at the end of his life promoted reconciliation between the former German inhabitants, including himself, and the new Polish settlers and administration of Racibórz.

In 1997, a flood devastated the town. As a result, the Racibórz Dolny flood control reservoir located nearby the town was built and officially opened in 2020. The reservoir has the capacity of 185 million cubic meters and cost an estimated 2 billion zloty. It played a crucial role in protecting Racibórz and the cities of Opole and Wrocław from flooding during the 2024 Central European floods.

== Climate ==
Racibórz has an oceanic climate (Köppen climate classification: Cfb) using the −3 °C (27 °F) isotherm or a humid continental climate (Köppen climate classification: Dfb) using the 0 °C (32 °F) isotherm.

Climate data for Racibórz (1991–2020 normals, extremes 1951–present)
Month	Jan	Feb	Mar	Apr	May	Jun	Jul	Aug	Sep	Oct	Nov	Dec	Year
Record high °C (°F)	14.7 (58.5)	19.4 (66.9)	24.3 (75.7)	28.9 (84.0)	32.3 (90.1)	34.3 (93.7)	36.2 (97.2)	37.7 (99.9)	34.7 (94.5)	26.6 (79.9)	21.7 (71.1)	17.3 (63.1)	37.7 (99.9)
Mean daily maximum °C (°F)	1.9 (35.4)	3.8 (38.8)	8.4 (47.1)	15.1 (59.2)	19.6 (67.3)	22.9 (73.2)	25.4 (77.7)	25.3 (77.5)	19.7 (67.5)	14.0 (57.2)	8.1 (46.6)	3.0 (37.4)	13.9 (57.0)
Daily mean °C (°F)	−0.9 (30.4)	0.3 (32.5)	4.0 (39.2)	9.4 (48.9)	13.9 (57.0)	17.3 (63.1)	19.2 (66.6)	19.0 (66.2)	14.2 (57.6)	9.4 (48.9)	4.8 (40.6)	0.4 (32.7)	9.3 (48.7)
Mean daily minimum °C (°F)	−3.7 (25.3)	−2.8 (27.0)	0.2 (32.4)	4.0 (39.2)	8.5 (47.3)	11.9 (53.4)	13.4 (56.1)	13.2 (55.8)	9.5 (49.1)	5.7 (42.3)	2.0 (35.6)	−2.1 (28.2)	5.0 (41.0)
Record low °C (°F)	−29.7 (−21.5)	−28.8 (−19.8)	−23.2 (−9.8)	−6.2 (20.8)	−2.6 (27.3)	0.5 (32.9)	4.8 (40.6)	2.9 (37.2)	−2.7 (27.1)	−7.2 (19.0)	−15.6 (3.9)	−27.1 (−16.8)	−29.7 (−21.5)
Average precipitation mm (inches)	27.2 (1.07)	25.1 (0.99)	31.4 (1.24)	36.8 (1.45)	68.2 (2.69)	77.9 (3.07)	90.7 (3.57)	69.3 (2.73)	63.3 (2.49)	46.7 (1.84)	38.1 (1.50)	30.1 (1.19)	604.8 (23.81)
Average extreme snow depth cm (inches)	6.7 (2.6)	6.2 (2.4)	3.1 (1.2)	1.1 (0.4)	0.0 (0.0)	0.0 (0.0)	0.0 (0.0)	0.0 (0.0)	0.0 (0.0)	0.2 (0.1)	2.0 (0.8)	3.8 (1.5)	6.7 (2.6)
Average precipitation days (≥ 0.1 mm)	15.03	13.52	13.89	11.50	13.83	13.53	14.20	11.93	11.80	12.83	13.63	14.10	159.80
Average snowy days (≥ 0 cm)	14.9	13.3	5.5	0.9	0.0	0.0	0.0	0.0	0.0	0.2	3.6	9.4	47.8
Average relative humidity (%)	84.9	82.2	77.3	71.2	73.7	75.3	73.7	73.4	79.1	82.7	85.9	86.2	78.8
Mean monthly sunshine hours	47.1	67.0	116.0	179.8	220.7	224.1	240.7	235.2	153.4	107.4	56.7	41.4	1,689.5
Source 1: Institute of Meteorology and Water Management
Source 2: Meteomodel.pl (records, relative humidity 1991–2020)

== Districts ==
- Centrum
- Nowe Zagrody
- Ocice
- Stara Wieś
- Miedonia
- Ostróg
- Markowice
- Płonia
- Brzezie
- Sudół
- Studzienna
- Obora

== Culture ==
The officially protected traditional beverage from Racibórz is local beer, which is produced in various styles (as designated by the Ministry of Agriculture and Rural Development of Poland).

In culture, "Ratibor" is the first of thirteen geographic locations namechecked in the most famous work by Austrian composer Ernst Toch, his 1930 Fuge aus der Geographie.

== Sports ==
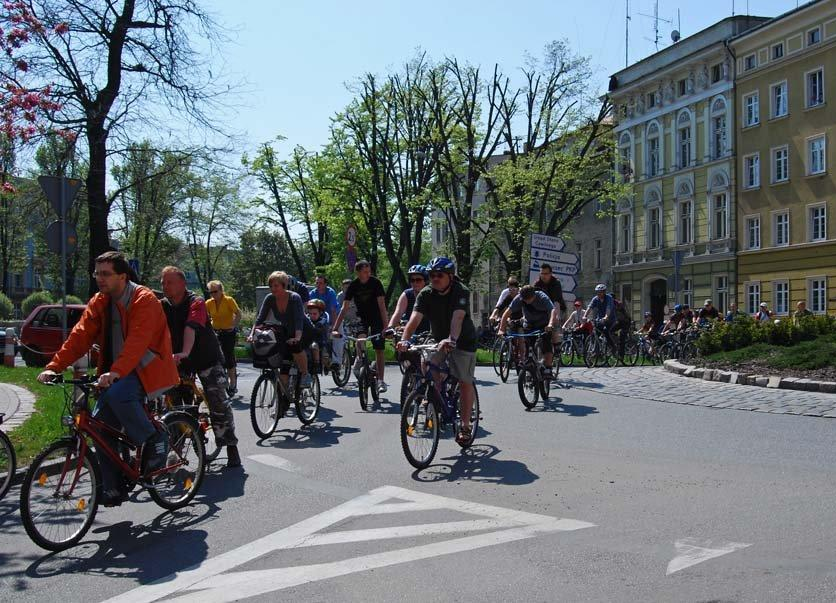
Racibórz Critical Mass in 2009

The local men's football team is KP Unia Racibórz. It competes in the lower leagues, however, it played in the Polish top division in the past. Defunct women's football club RTP Unia Racibórz was also based in the town. It played in Poland's top division, and won five consecutive national championships from 2009 to 2013.

== Notable people ==
- Wawrzyniec z Raciborza (1381–1448), Roman Catholic theologian
- Joseph Freiherr von Eichendorff (1788–1857), Prussian poet, playwright
- Julius Reinhold Friedlander (1803–1839), educator, founder of the Pennsylvania Institution for the Instruction of the Blind
- Ludwig Traube (1818–1876), German physician
- Moritz Traube (1826–1894), German chemist
- Paul Guttmann (1834–1893), German pathologist
- Eufemia von Adlersfeld-Ballestrem (1854-1941), German novelist
- Hermann Traube (1860–1913), German mineralogist
- Johannes Thiele (1865–1918), German chemist
- Wilhelm Traube (1866–1942), German chemist
- Else Berg (1877–1942), German-Dutch painter
- Arthur Löwenstamm (1882–1965), rabbi
- Augustin Souchy (1892–1984), German anarchist
- Fritz Otto Bernert (1893–1918), German fighter ace of World War I
- Willibald Borowietz (1893–1945), Wehrmacht general
- Gertrud Arndt (1903–2000), German photographer
- Günther Friedländer (1912–1920), Founder of Teva Pharmaceuticals
- Herbert Kutscha (1917–2003), German Luftwaffe fighter ace
- Hannes Rosenow (1925-2000), German painter
- Claus Ogerman (1930–2016), German–American musician
- Hubert Kostka (born 1940), footballer
- Marek Migalski (born 1969), politician, Member of the European Parliament, political scientist, and columnist
- Ryszard Wolny (born 1969), wrestler and Olympic champion
- Arkadiusz Mularczyk (born 1971), politician
- Magdalena Walach (born 1976), actress
- Rafał Brzoska (born 1977), entrepreneur, founder of InPost
- Michał Kamiński (born 1987), volleyball player
- Artur Noga (born 1988), athlete
- Sebastian Tyrała (born 1988), Polish-German footballer
- Justyna Święty-Ersetic (born 1992), sprinter
- Łukasz Moneta (born 1994), footballer
- Denis Kudla (wrestler) (born 1994), German wrestler

== Twin towns – sister cities ==
Racibórz is twinned with:

- Kędzierzyn-Koźle, Poland
- Leverkusen, Germany
- Opava, Czech Republic
- Roth, Germany
- Tysmenytsia, Ukraine
- Villeneuve-d'Ascq, France
- Zugló (Budapest), Hungary

Former twin towns:

- Kaliningrad, Russia (terminated in 2022 due to the Russian invasion of Ukraine)

== Gallery ==
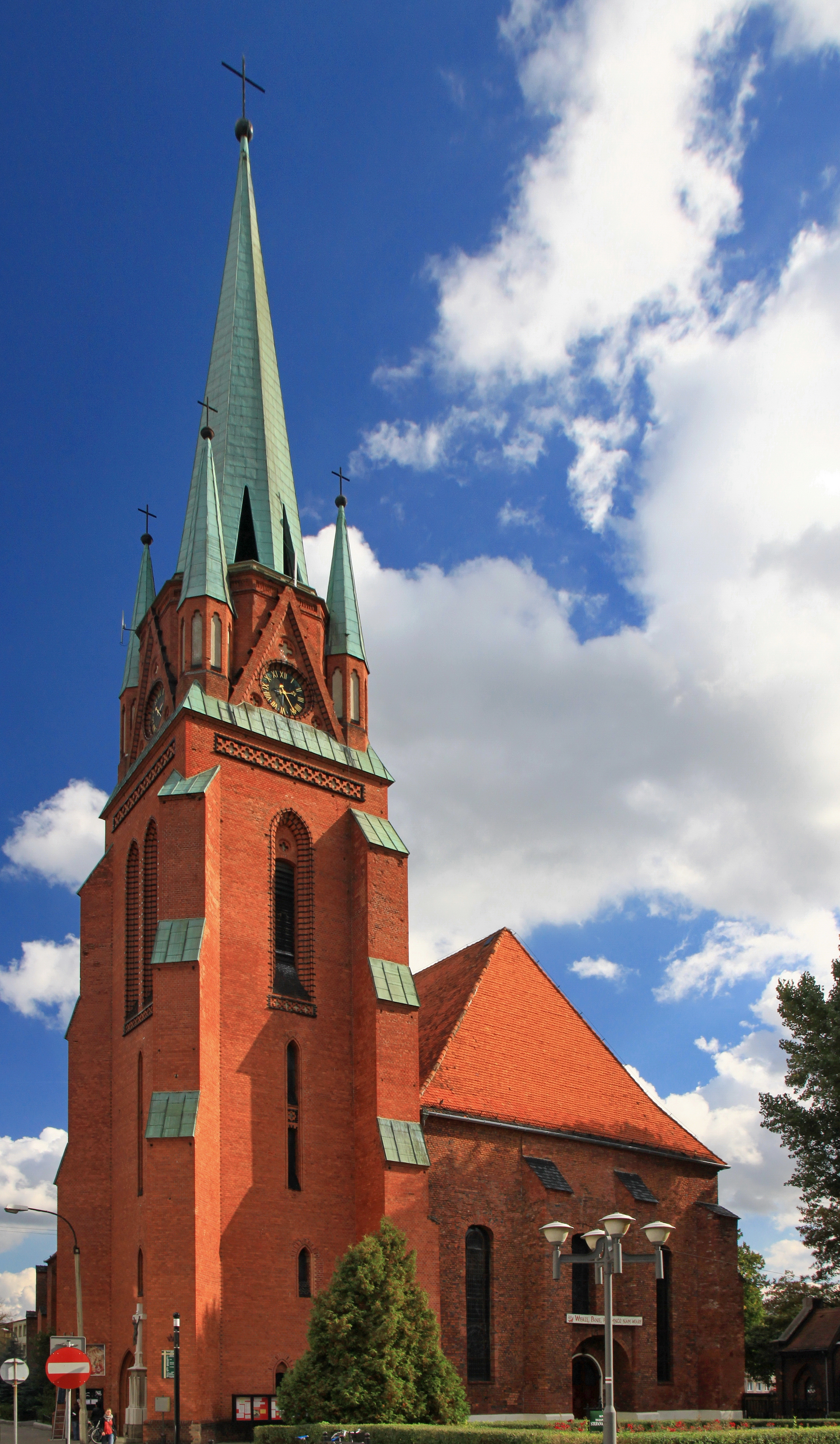
Parish church of the Assumption of the Blessed Virgin Mary

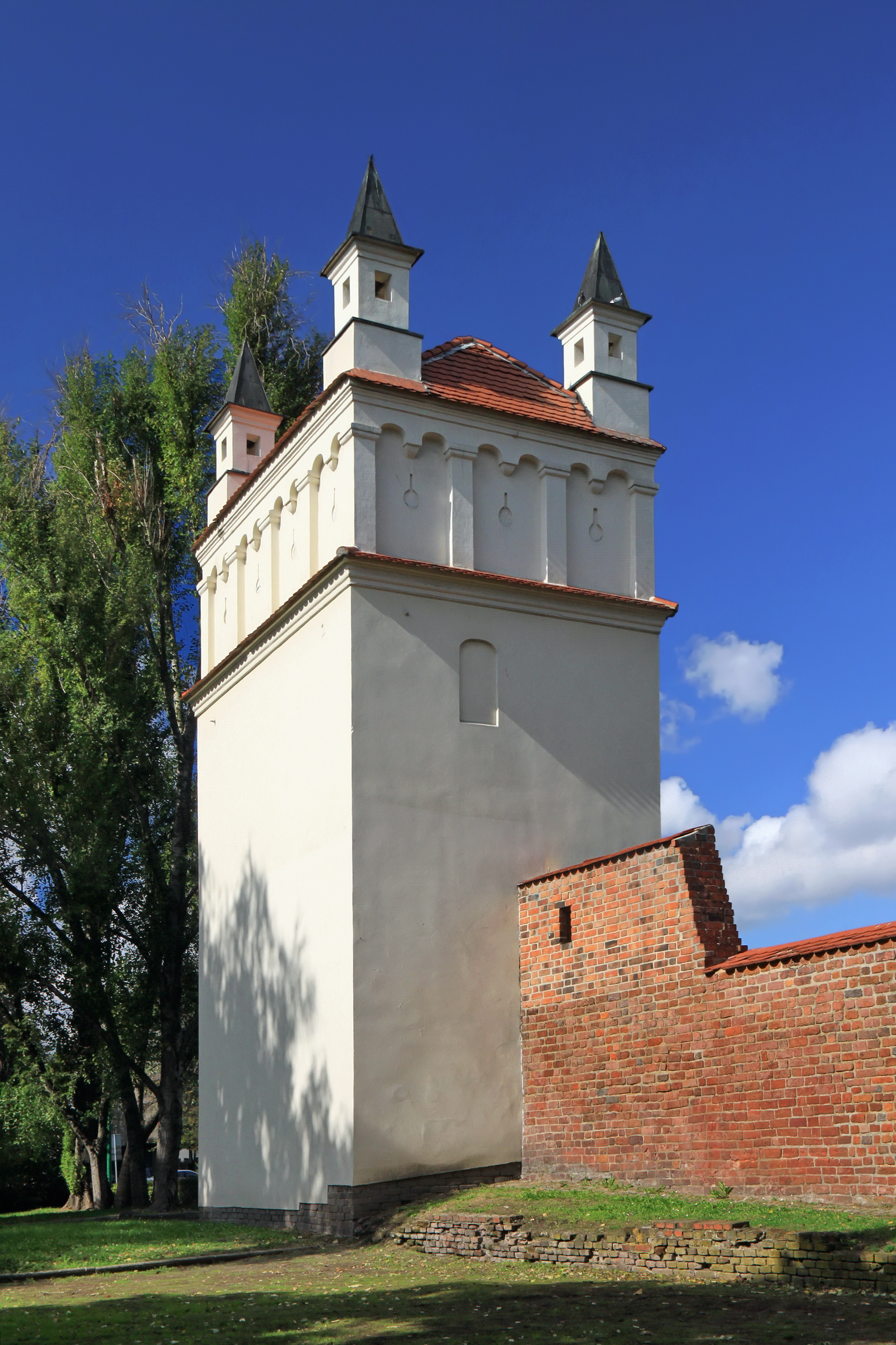
Prison Tower

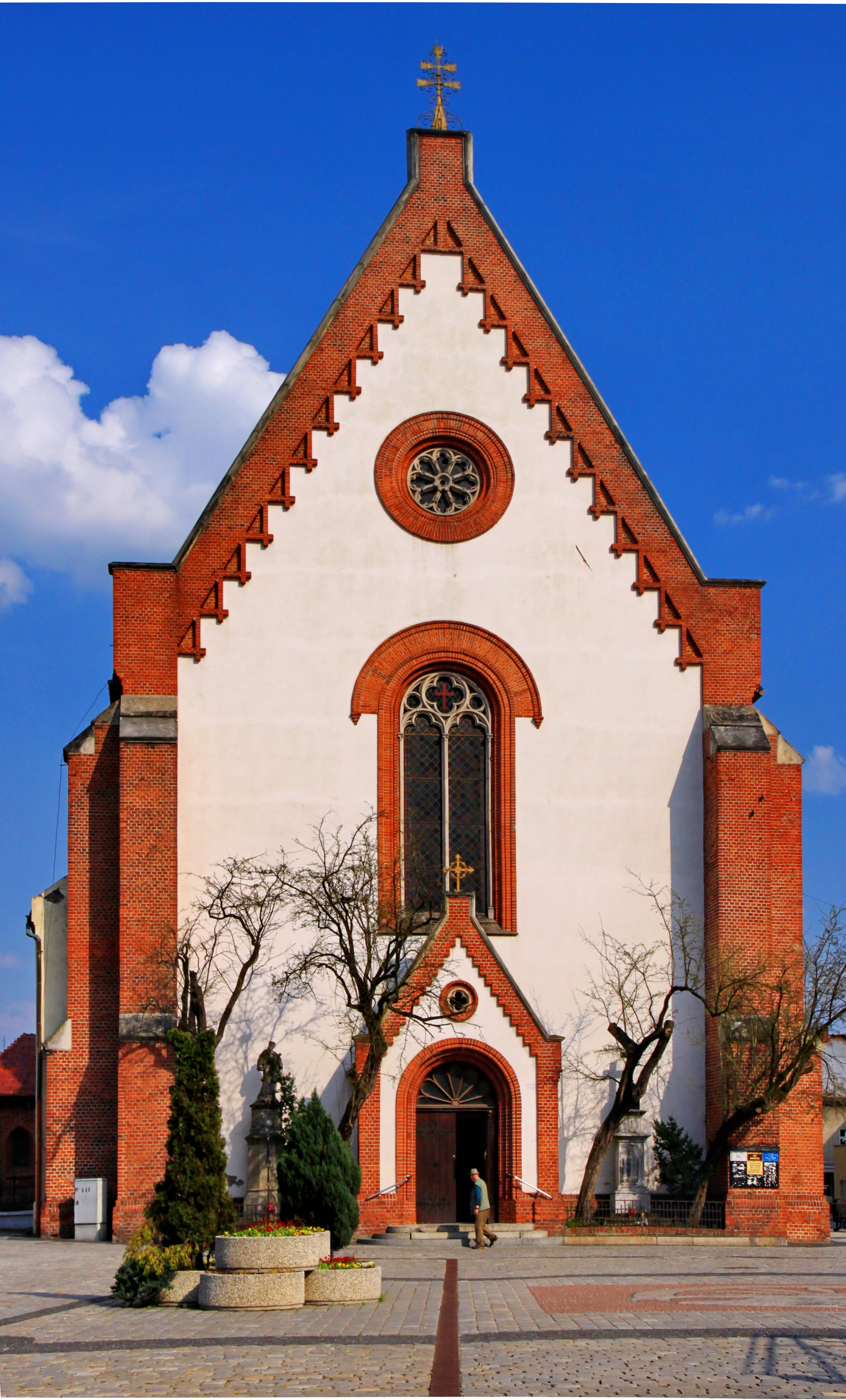
Saint James church

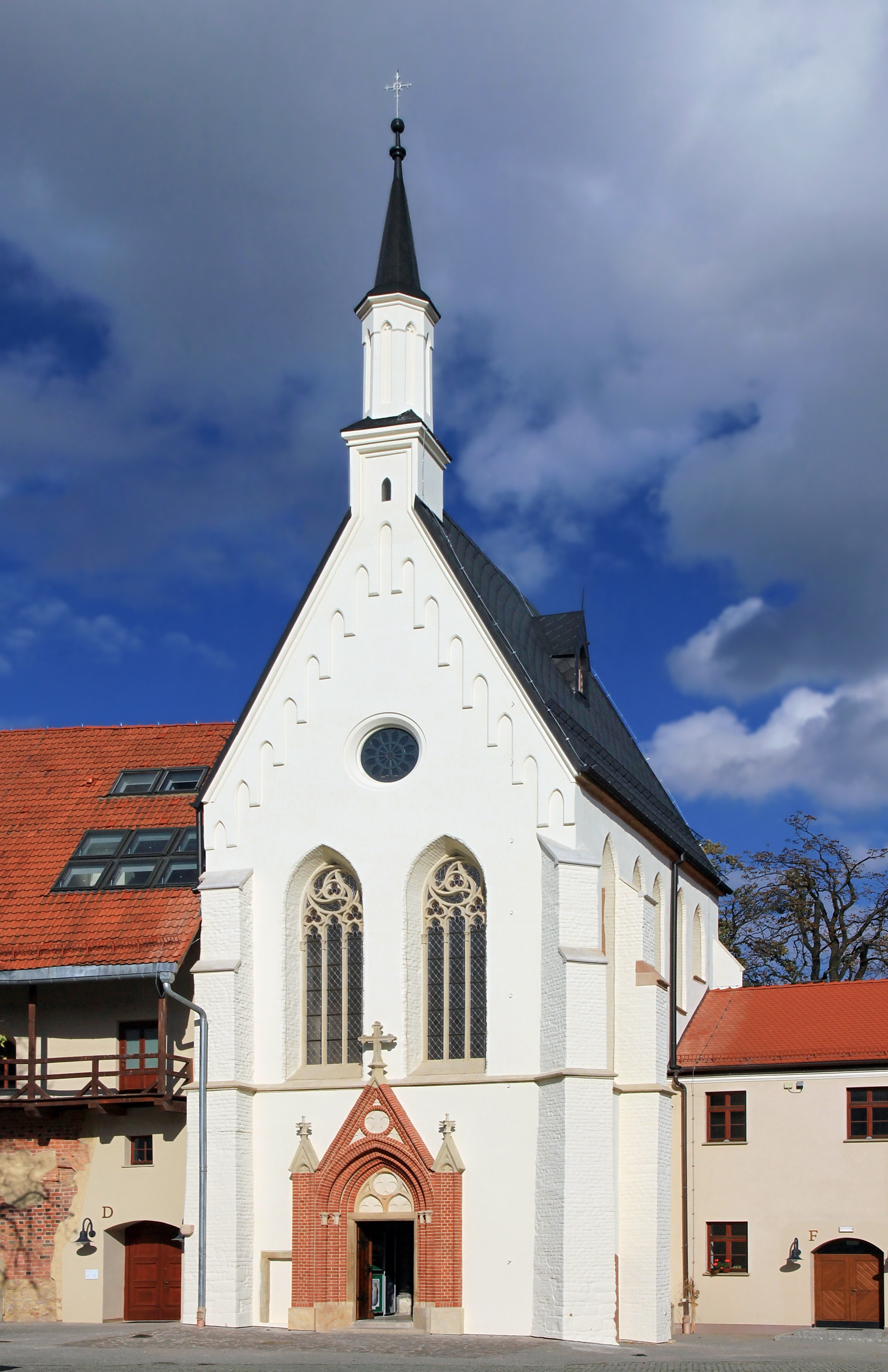
Chapel of St. Thomas Becket

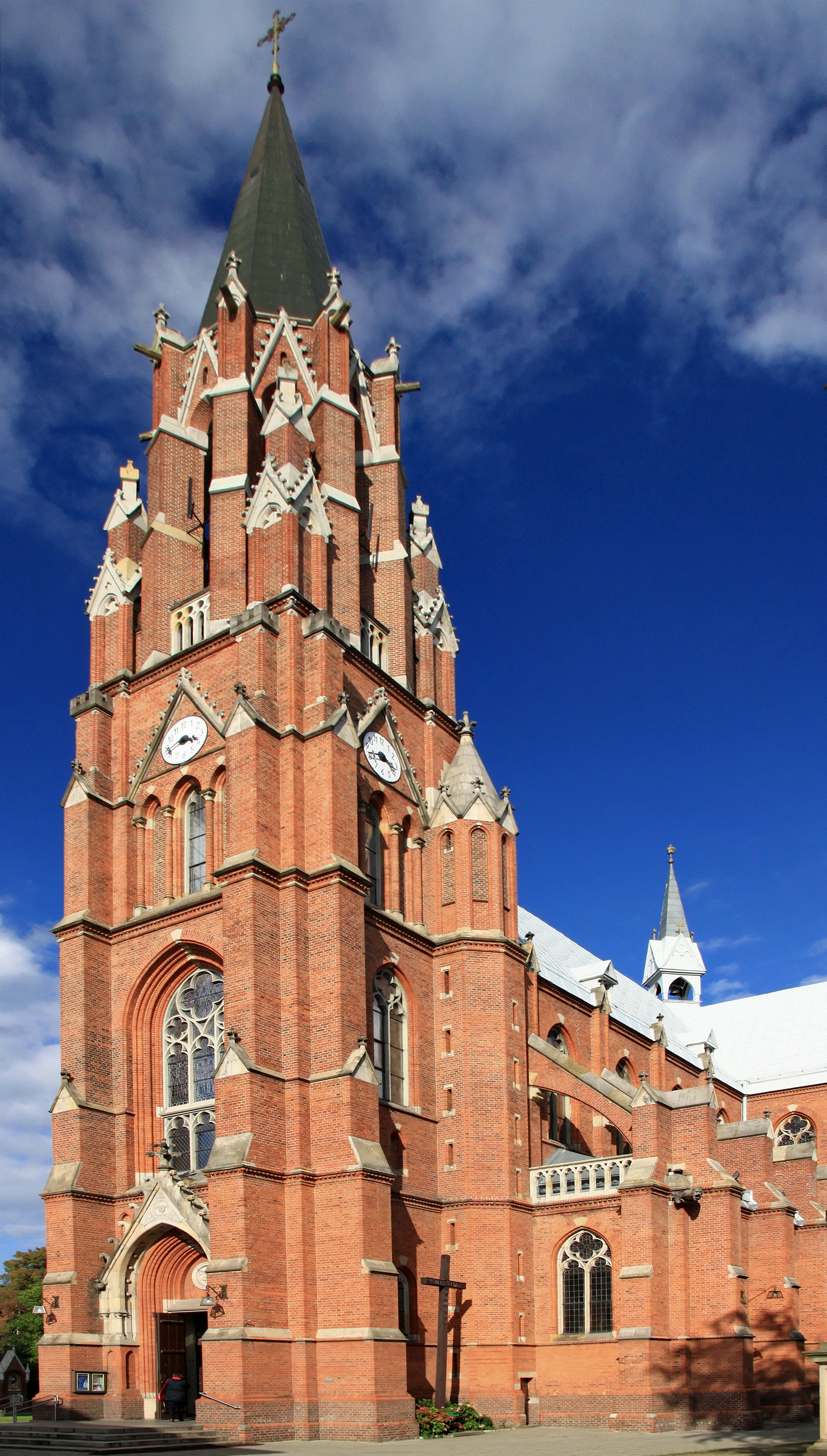
Church of John the Baptist

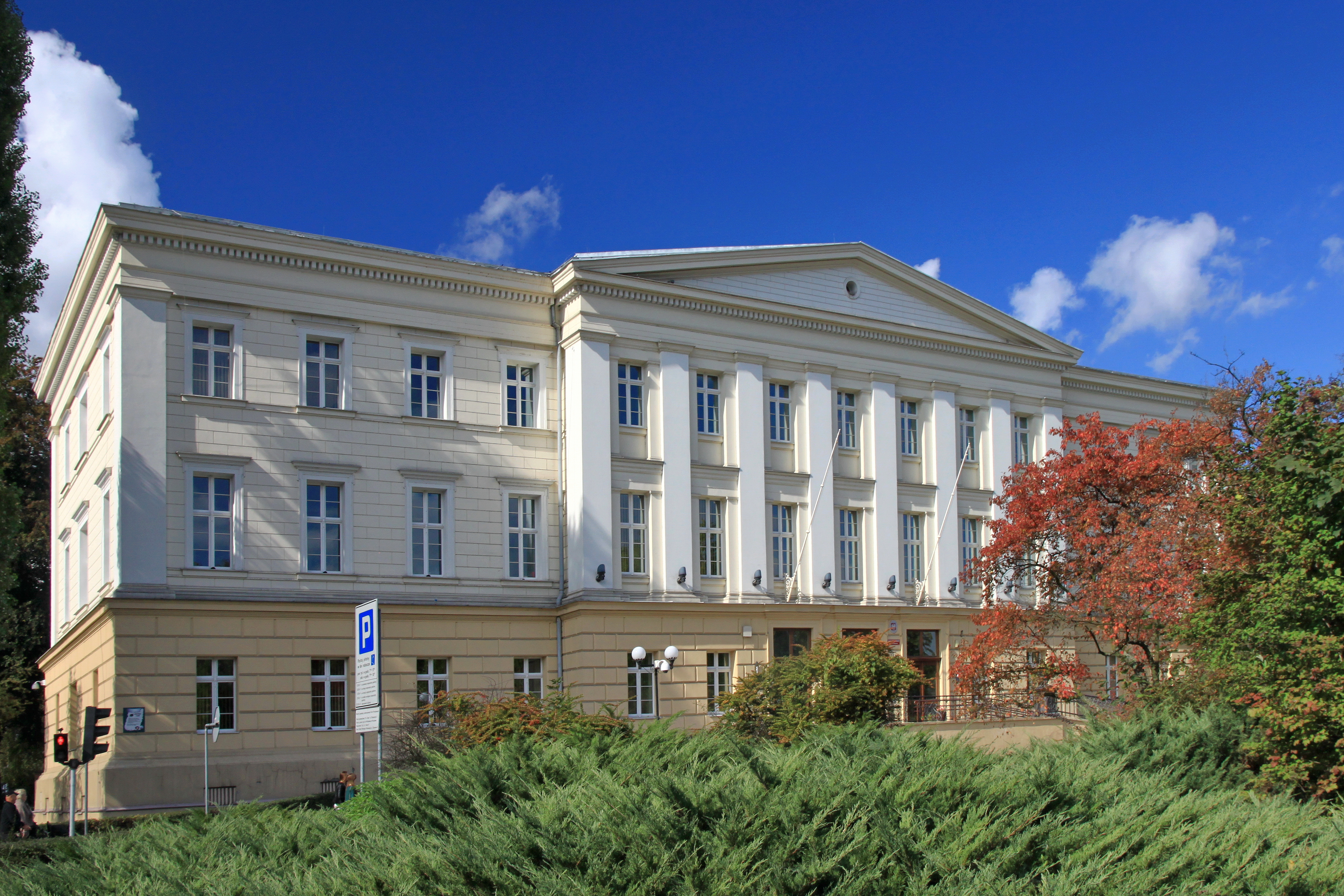
District Court

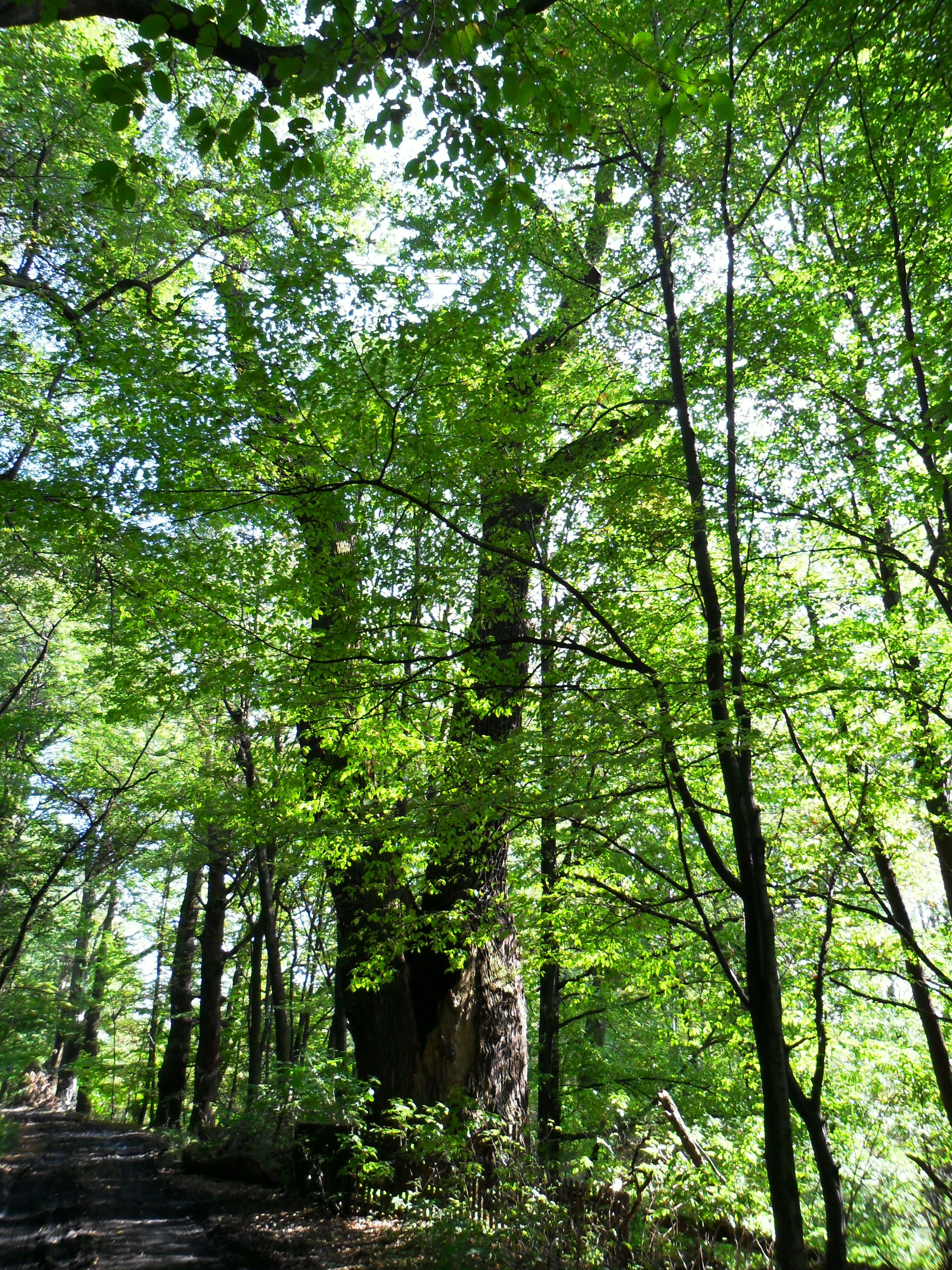
Sobieski Oak

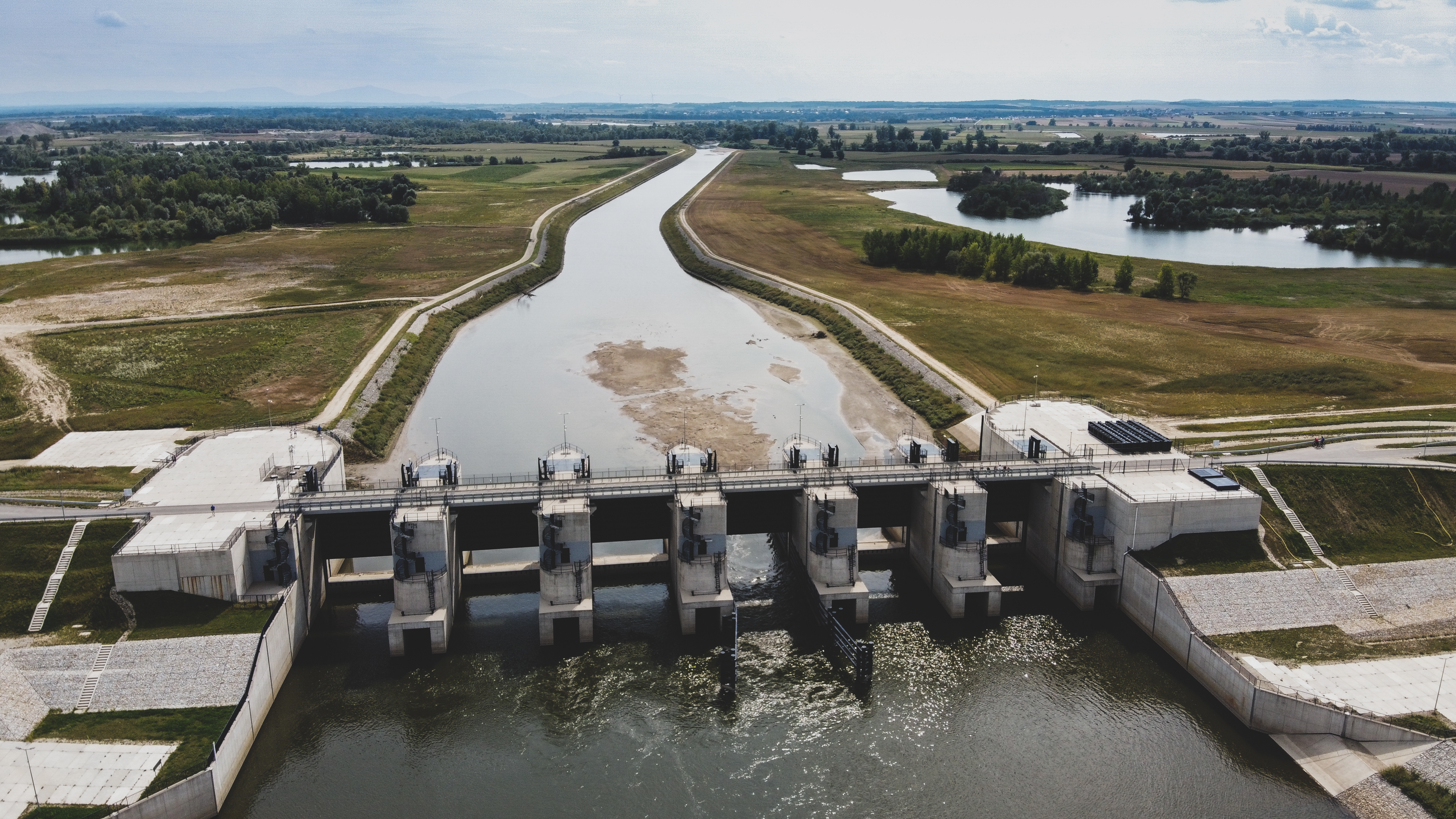
Racibórz Dolny reservoir

== See also ==
- Wileńska Street, Racibórz
- Water supply in Racibórz
- Population of Racibórz
