= Kobyla, Silesian Voivodeship =

Kobyla
- Village
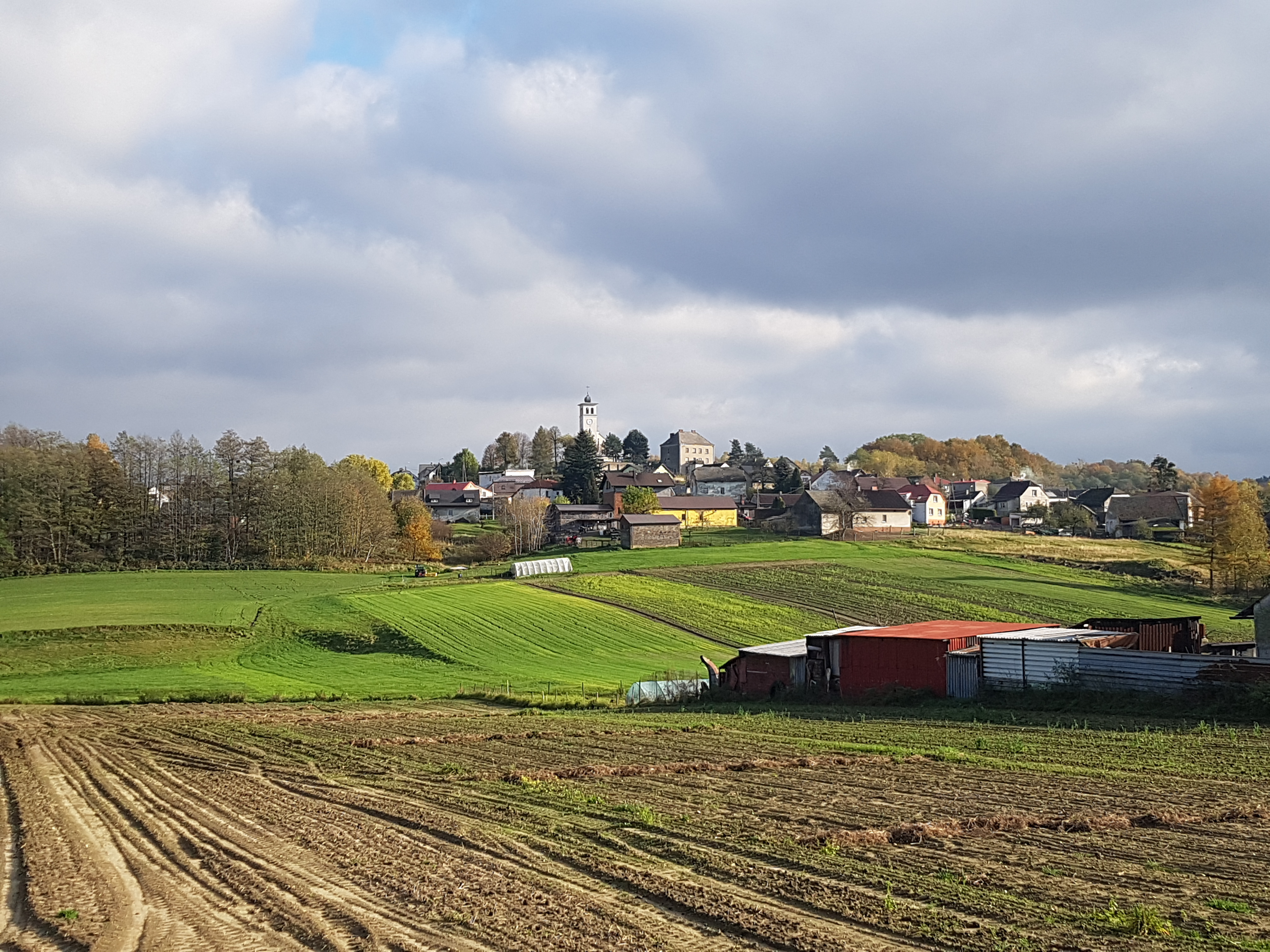
- General view of the village

- Location within Poland
- Coordinates: 50°5′N 18°18′E
- Country: Poland
- Voivodeship: Silesian
- County: Racibórz
- Gmina: Kornowac

Population
  - Total: 990

Kobyla [kɔˈbɨla] is a village in the administrative district of Gmina Kornowac, within Racibórz County, Silesian Voivodeship, in southern Poland.
