= Wawrzyniec z Raciborza =

Polish professor and theologian (c.1381–1448)

Wawrzyniec z Raciborza (ca. 1381–1448), also known as Laurencius Nicolai Nueschie de Racibórz, was an Upper Silesian theologian, preacher, professor and rector of the Kraków Academy. He was active in Kraków, Poland.

He was likely born in Racibórz around 1381 or 1393 into the bourgeois Keczer family, and graduated from a collegaiate school there. According to Jerzy Rebeta, his family later settled in Kraków. He began studies at the Faculty of Arts of the Kraków Academy and matriculated in 1411. He was entered in the academic records as Laurencius Nicolai Nuschie, which was later corrected to Laurencius Nicolai Nueschie de Racibórz. He obtained a bachelor's degree in 1414 and a master's degree in 1416. He continued his studies at the Faculty of Theology, where he obtained a master's degree, a doctorate and a professorship. He lectured in the years 1420-1421 and was dean of the faculty of liberal arts in the semesters of 1421/1422 and 1426/1427. In the years 1428-1429 he was rector of the Kraków Academy.

In 1431 he was a member of the delegation to the Council of Basel, where he strongly condemned Hussitism. He is listed among the professors of the Kraków Academy in the 1441 census. In 1432-1446 he was a canon of the collegiate chapter at the Church of the Assumption of the Blessed Virgin Mary in Racibórz.

Throughout his academic career, which spanned almost 40 years, he lectured at three faculties: liberal arts, theology, and decrees. He was also an astronomer. He constructed a sundial and other astronomical instruments. His duties also involved calculatinf the times of solar and lunar eclipses in the following calendar year.

== Works ==
- Principium in Bibliam (1426)
- Determinatio Basiliensis
- Kazania (Sermons)
- Expositio Psalmi 118 (disputed authorship)
