= Kornowac =

- Village
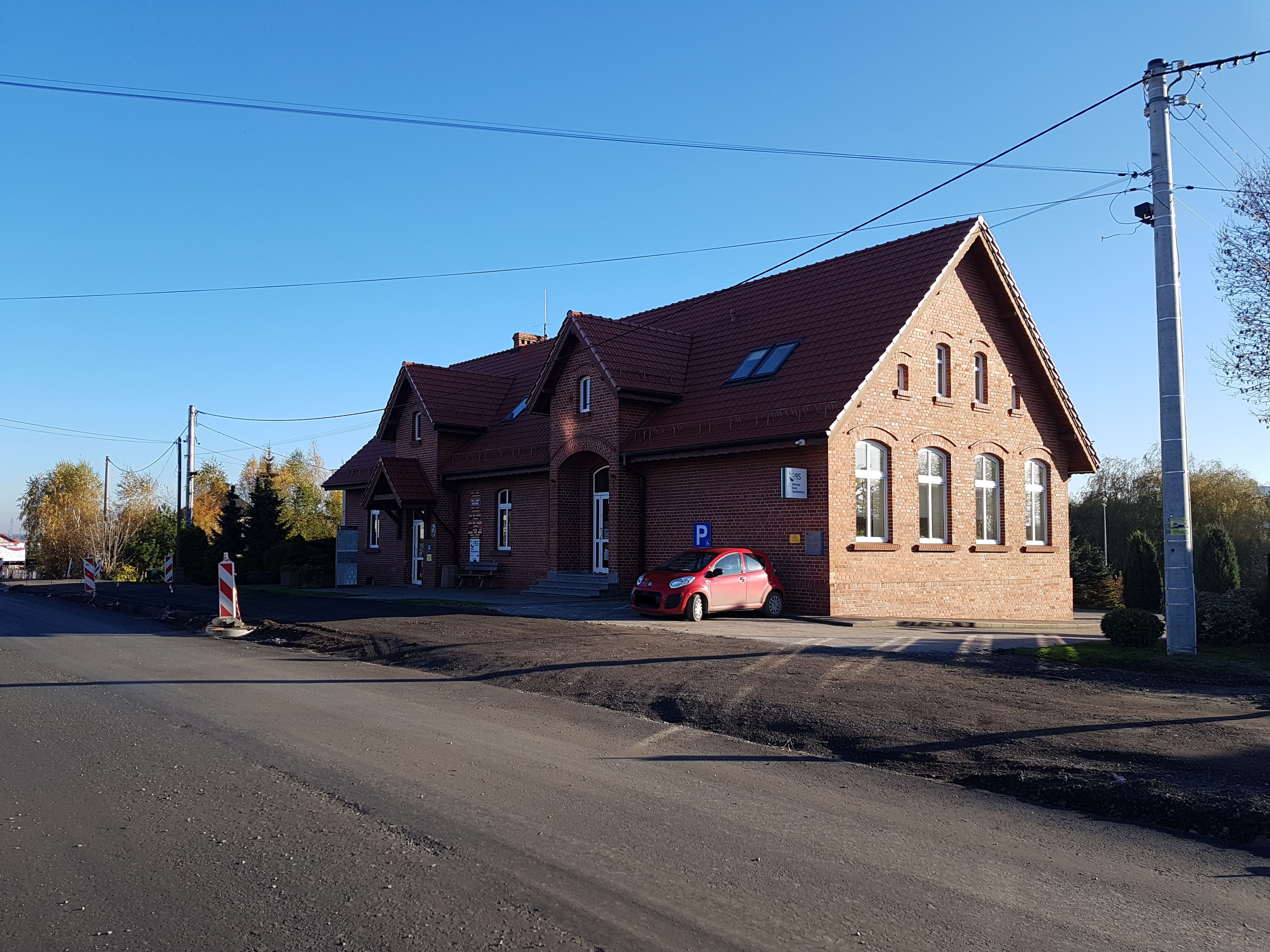
- Gmina office

- Location within Poland
- Coordinates: 50°4′N 18°19′E
- Country: Poland
- Voivodeship: Silesian
- County: Racibórz
- Gmina: Kornowac
- Population: 890

Kornowac [kɔrˈnɔvat͡s] is a village in Racibórz County, Silesian Voivodeship, in southern Poland. It is the seat of the gmina (administrative district) called Gmina Kornowac.
