= Brzezie, Racibórz =

Brzezie
- Racibórz District
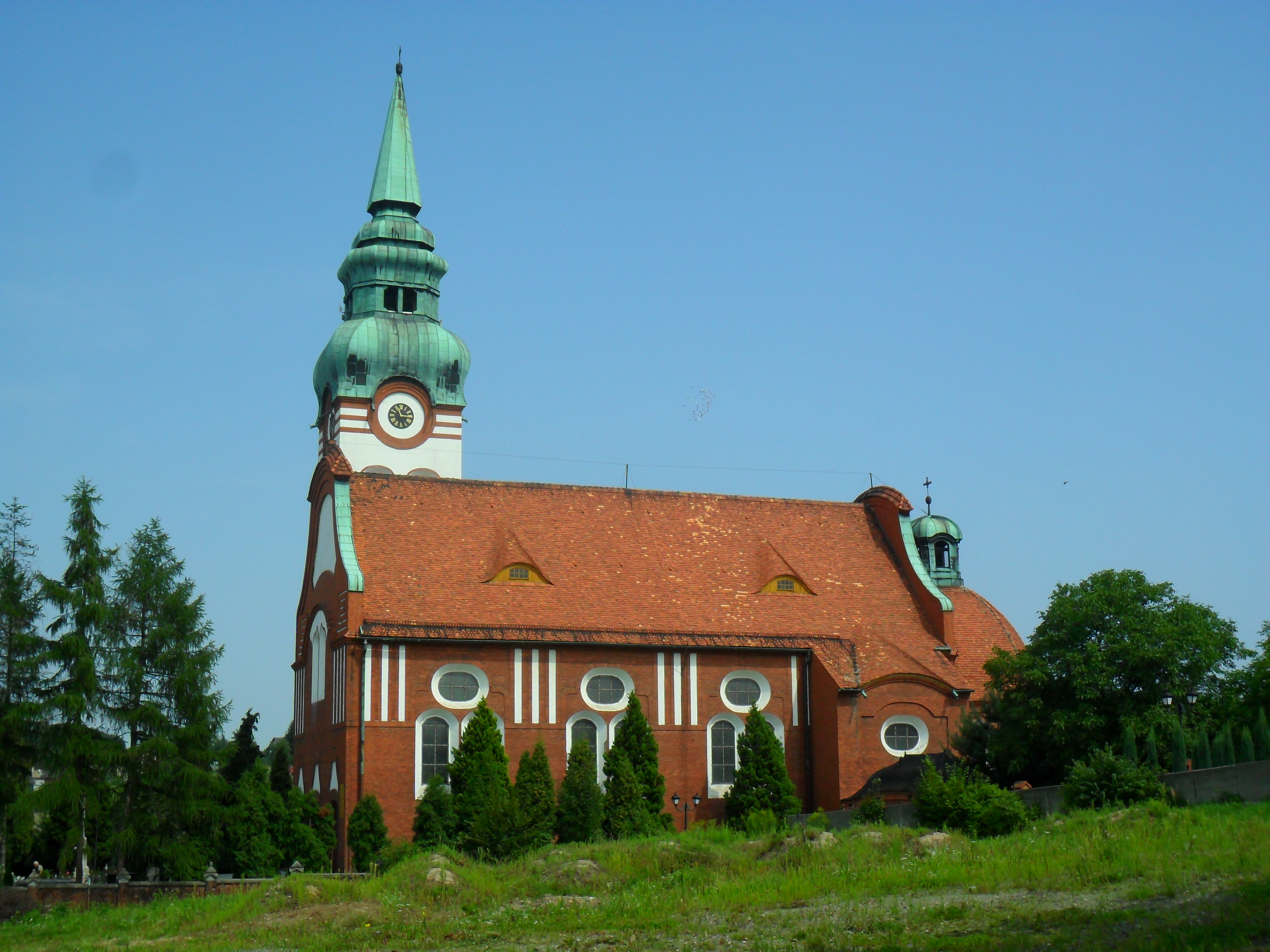
- Saints Matthew and Matthias church

- (9) Location of Brzezie within Racibórz
- Coordinates: 50°04′30″N 18°15′49″E
- Country: Poland
- Voivodeship: Silesian
- County: Racibórz
- Gmina/Town: Racibórz
- First mentioned: 1223
- Time zone: UTC+1 (CET)
  - Summer (DST): UTC+2 (CEST)
- Area code: (+48) 032
- Vehicle registration: SRC

Brzezie (German: Hohenbirken) is a dzielnica (district) of Racibórz, Silesian Voivodeship, southern Poland. It is located on the right bank of the Oder river, across the old town.

== History ==
The village was mentioned already in 1223. It became a seat of a Catholic parish in Żory deanery of Diocese of Wrocław, established probably in the second half of the 13th century, first mentioned in 1335 as Birkindorf in an incomplete register of Peter's Pence payment composed by Galhard de Carceribus.

Politically the village belonged initially to the Duchy of Opole and Racibórz, within feudally fragmentated Poland, ruled by a local branch of the Silesian Piast dynasty. As a result of further fragmentation, since 1281 it formed part of the Duchy of Racibórz, which became a fee of the Kingdom of Bohemia in 1327. From 1521, it was part of the reunited Duchy of Opole and Racibórz, remaining under the Piast dynasty until 1532, when it was integrated with Habsburg-ruled Bohemian Crown. In 1645 it returned to Polish rule under the House of Vasa. After Silesian Wars it was annexed by the Kingdom of Prussia, and from 1871 it was also part of Germany.

After World War I in the Upper Silesia plebiscite 733 out of 1,444 voters (plus 5 out of 40 in manor goods) in Brzezie voted in favour of rejoining Poland, which just regained independence, against 707 (plus 35 in manor goods) opting for staying in Germany. In 1922 it became a part of Silesian Voivodeship, Second Polish Republic. It lay on the border with Germany, where Racibórz stayed. It was then annexed by Nazi Germany during the invasion of Poland at the beginning of World War II in 1939. During the German occupation, the occupiers operated three forced labour subcamps (E414, E415, E550) of the Stalag VIII-B/344 prisoner-of-war camp in the village. After the war it was restored to Poland. It was a separate municipality until it was amalgamated with Racibórz in 1975.
