= Pogrzebień =

- Village
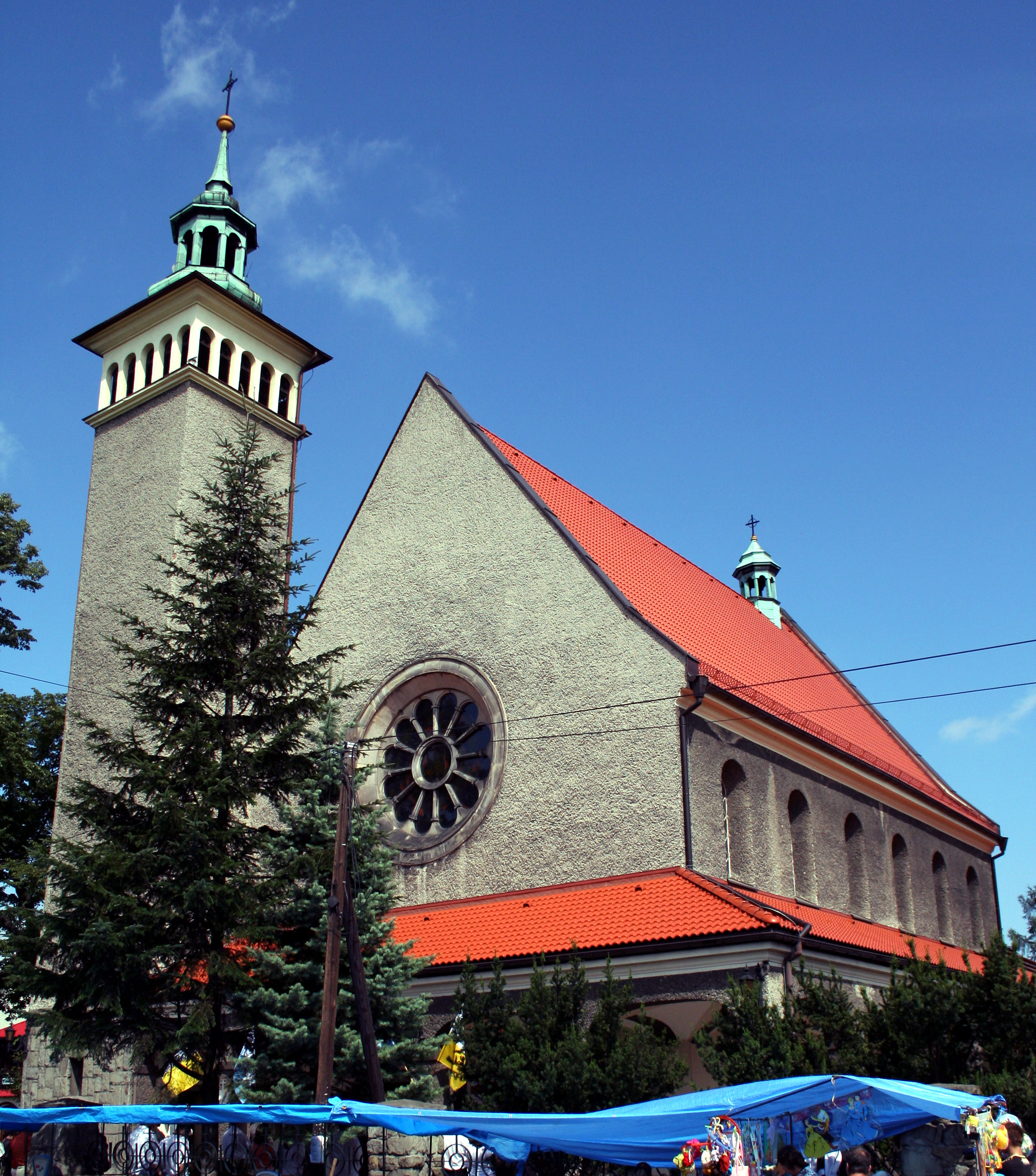
- Church of Saint Bartholomew

- Location within Poland
- Coordinates: 50°4′N 18°18′E
- Country: Poland
- Voivodeship: Silesian
- County: Racibórz
- Gmina: Kornowac

Population
  - Total: 1,100

Pogrzebień [pɔˈɡʐɛbjɛɲ] is a village in the administrative district of Gmina Kornowac, within Racibórz County, Silesian Voivodeship, in southern Poland.
