= Castle Chapel of St. Thomas Becket =

Castle chapel in Racibórz, Poland

Coordinates: 50°5′45.37″N 18°13′15.07″E

- Kaplica zamkowa pw. św. Tomasza Kantuaryjskiego
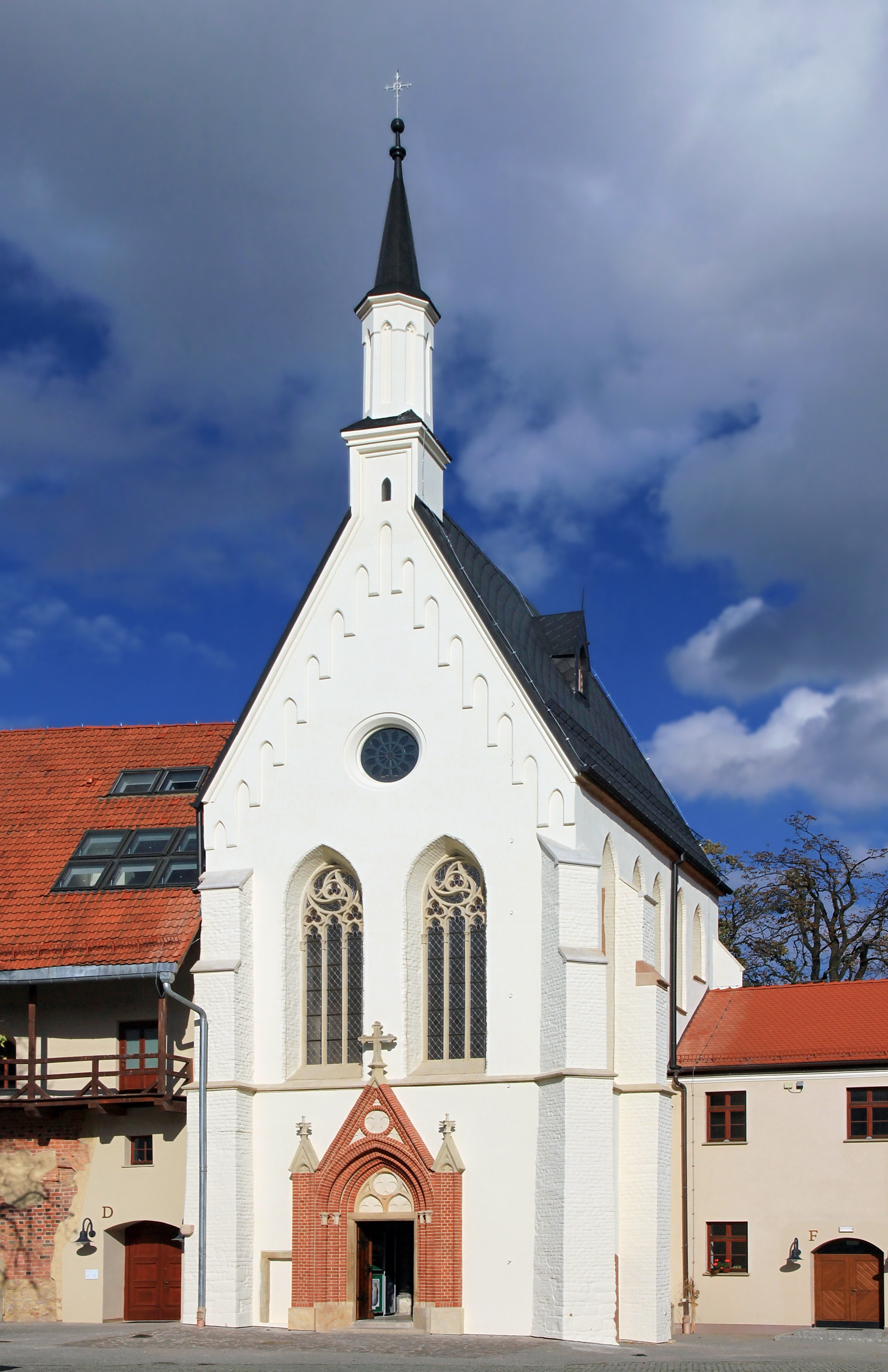
- Castle Chapel after renovations in 2013
- Castle Chapel of St. Thomas Becket
- Location: Racibórz
- Country: Poland
- Denomination: Catholic Church
- Churchmanship: Latin Church

History
- Dedication: St. Thomas Becket
- Dedicated: October 18, 1873

Architecture
- Style: Gothic
- Completed: 1380s

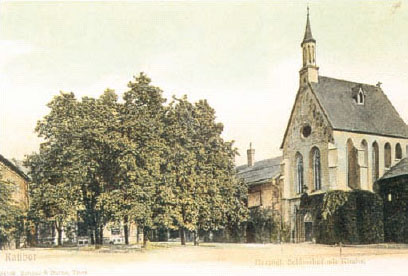
Castle courtyard and chapel – postcard from the 1920s

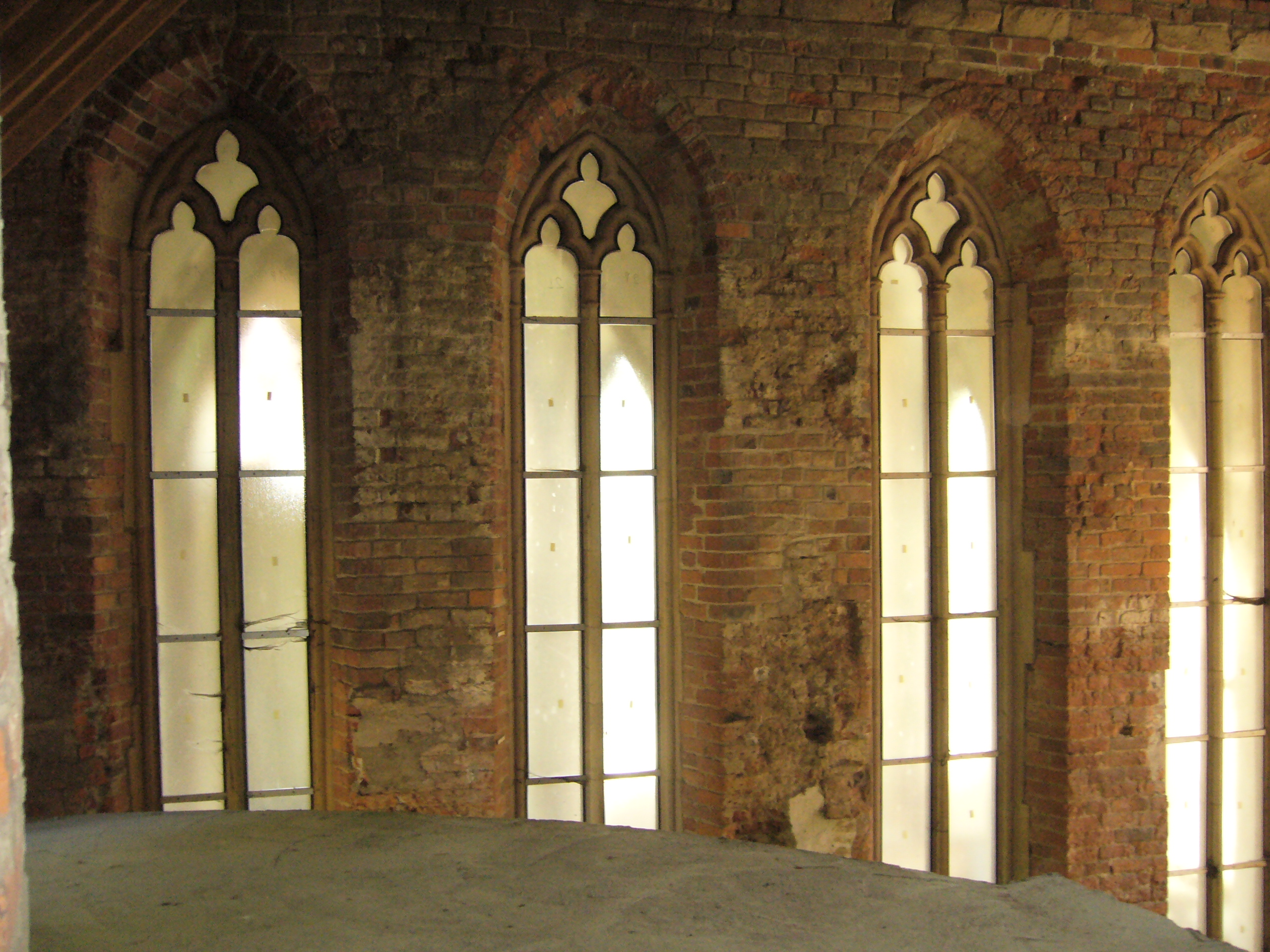
Chapel windows visible from inside the castle wing

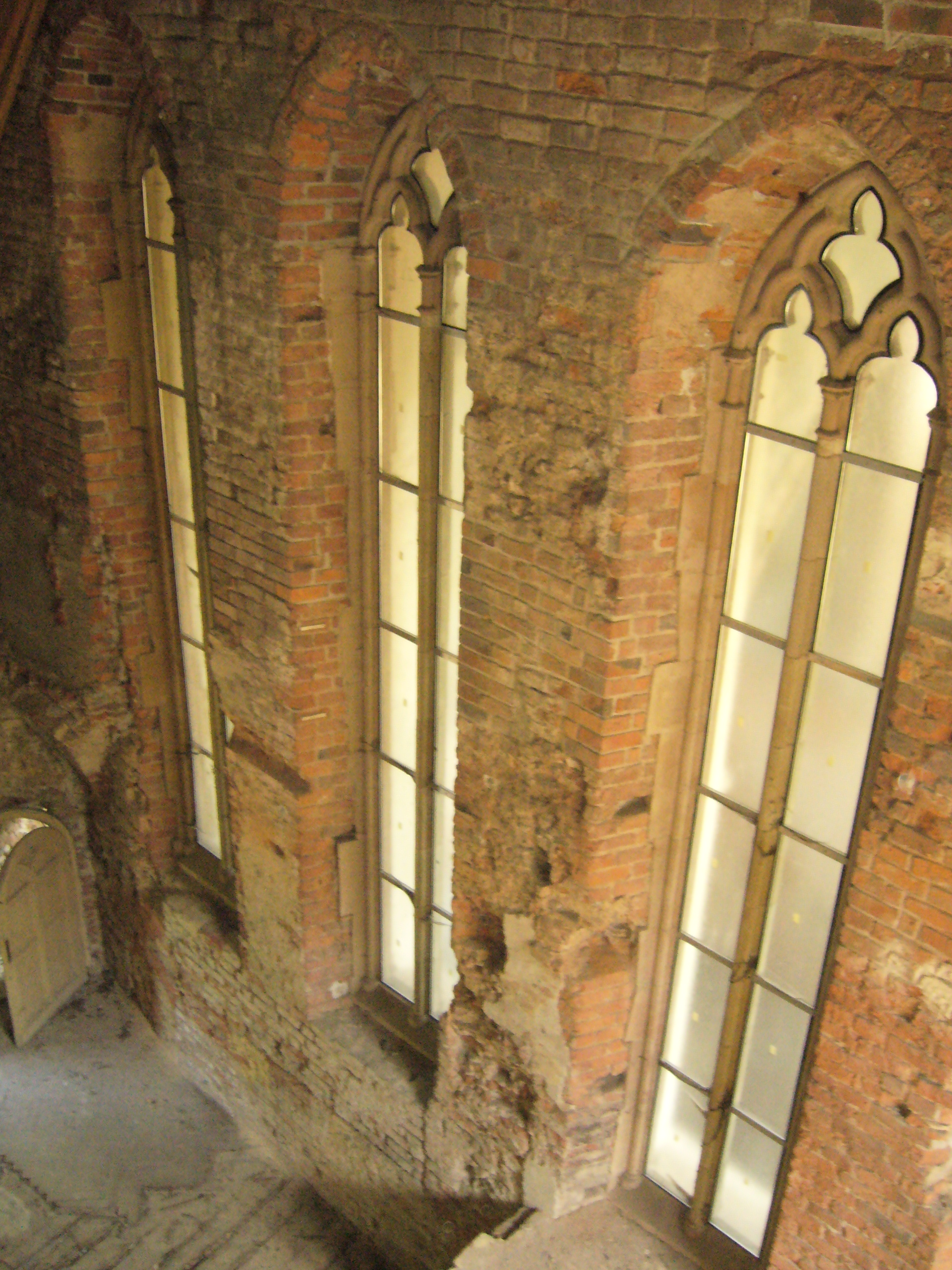
Chapel windows visible from inside the castle wing

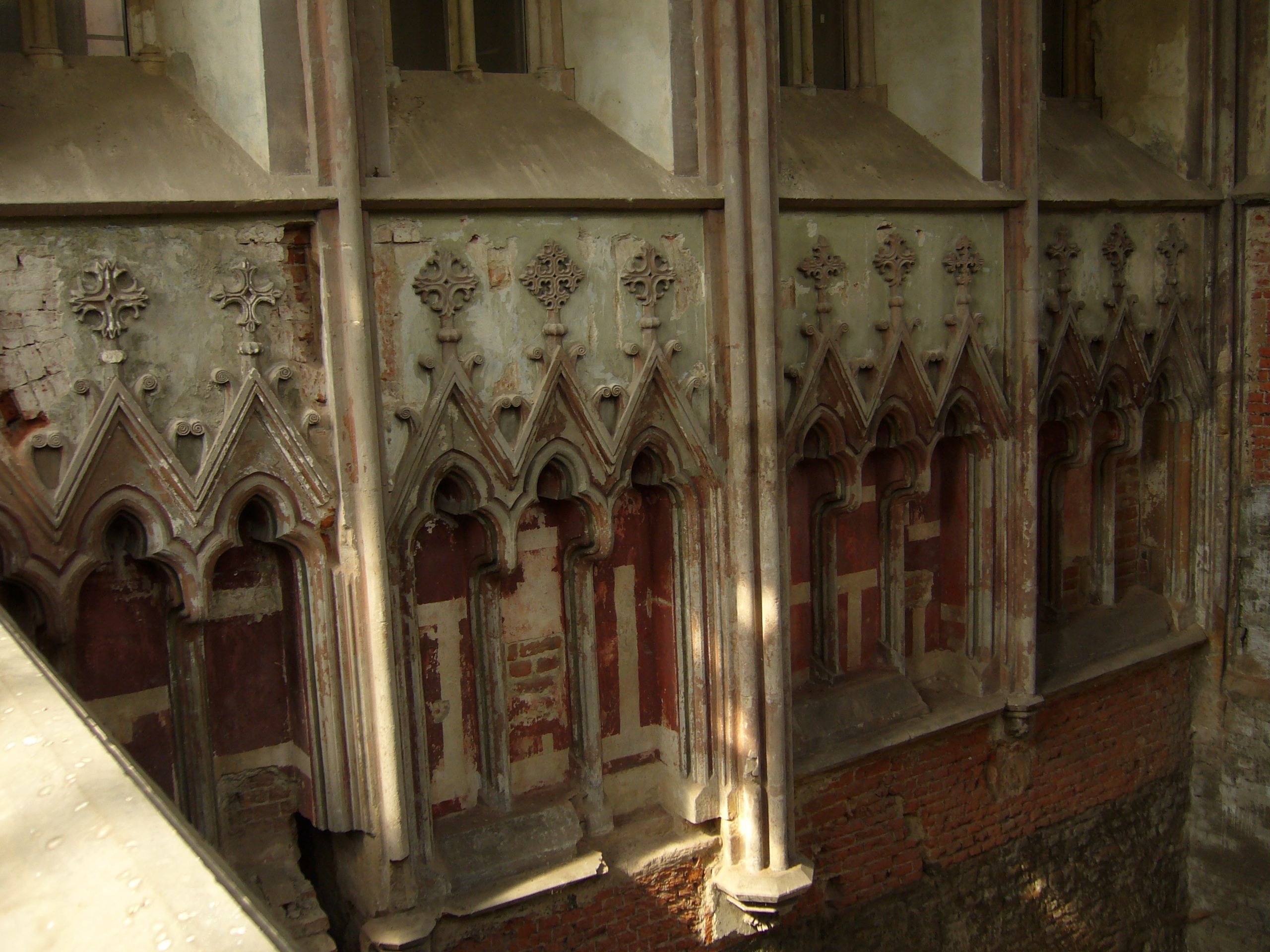
Part of the interior

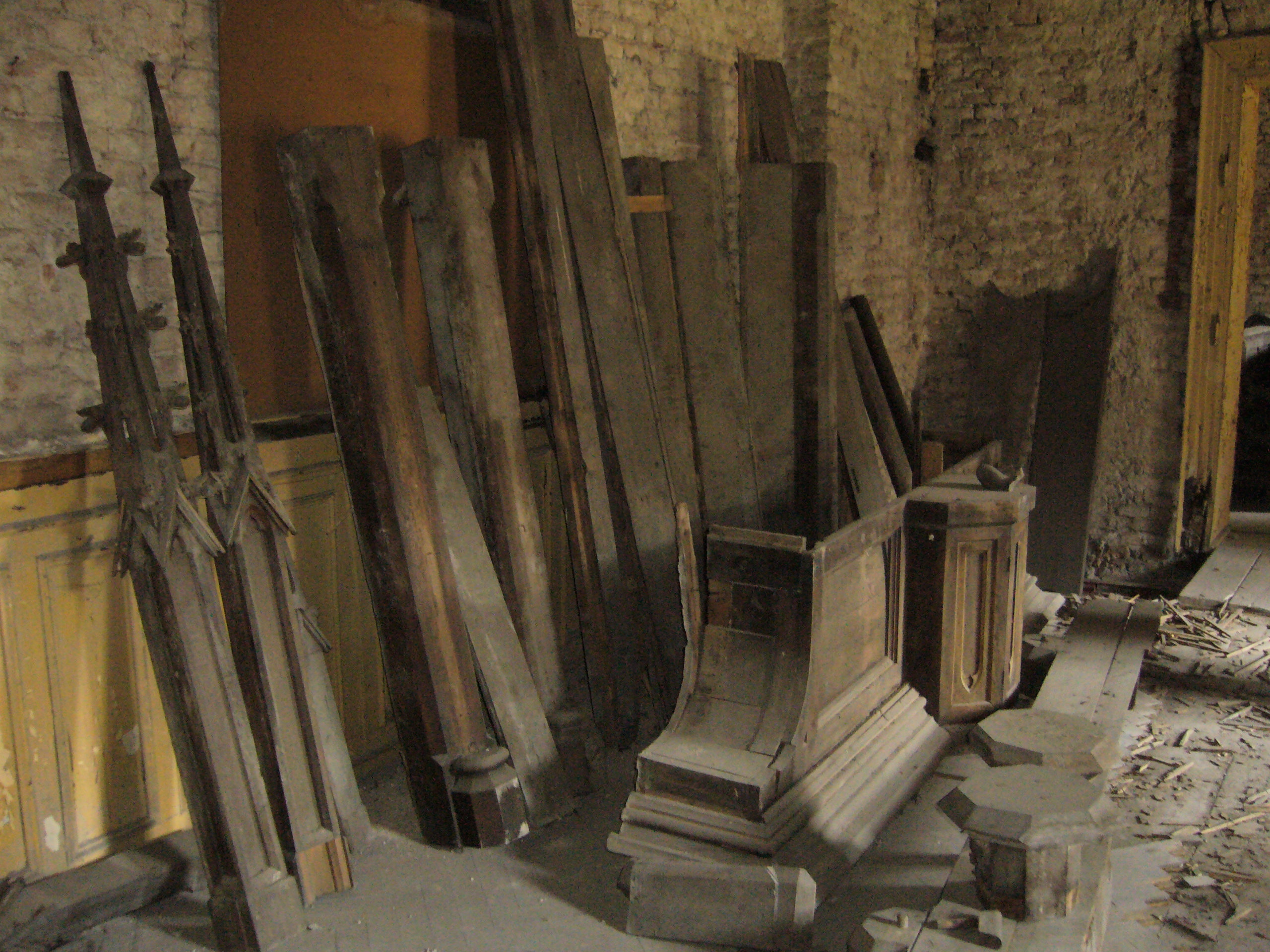
Altarpiece of the chapel pending restoration work

The Castle Chapel of St. Thomas Becket (also known as the Pearl of Silesian Gothic, or the Silesian Sainte-Chapelle) was built at the end of the 13th century and is located in the eastern wing of the castle in Racibórz. Originally constructed in the Gothic style, the building incorporates elements of Baroque and Neo-Gothic architecture.

From 1288 to 1416, a collegiate church was located next to the chapel, founded by the Bishop of Wrocław, Tomasz II. The temple was repeatedly ravaged by fires, including those in 1519, 1637, and 1858. In 1988, during renovation works, the so-called Schneider's map was discovered, showing a handwritten depiction of a legendary tunnel leading under the Oder river. The chapel likely housed relics of Thomas Becket or St. Stanislaus of Szczepanów.

== History ==
The chapel was built in the 1280s (between 1288 and 1293) as a result of the construction of a new stone castle. It was likely erected on the site of a Romanesque rotunda, as indicated by archaeological excavations conducted in the 1960s and 1980s. The previous church was probably dedicated to St. John the Baptist, whose patronage was transferred in 1307 to the church in Ostróg, built around the 12th century by Mieszko IV Tanglefoot. The foundation of the new chapel could not have occurred later than 1292 when construction began, funded by Przemysław of Racibórz. The dedication was most likely performed by Tomasz II, who sought refuge in Racibórz from Duke Henry Probus at that time, although the exact date of the dedication is unknown. In 1288, Bishop Tomasz II founded a collegiate church near the castle chapel as an expression of gratitude for the hospitality received. This event was described by Jan Długosz in the Annals or Chronicles of the Famous Kingdom of Poland:

Gathering a large army, both from his own soldiers and mercenaries hired with monetary contribution which he levied on the Wrocław Church, he militarily invaded the lands of Duke Casimir of Opole and besieged the city of Racibórz due to the presence of Bishop Tomasz of Wrocław and his clergy there. Although the wealthier citizens of Racibórz endured the siege for some time and promised to endure it even longer, the startled populace, feeling the scarcity and lack of food, tormented by hunger, continually wept, groaned loudly, and sighed, hurling curses and insults at Bishop Tomasz and his clergy. Touched by this, Bishop Tomasz, out of great kindness for which he was reputed, said: 'Rather let me and my clergy fall into the hands of the tyrant than these innocent people perish from hunger. We will immediately release from danger those besieged who are dying of fear and hunger. Let us, by our capture or, if it pleases God, by our death, avert the destruction threatening this city, which has sustained us for a long time and granted us refuge'. Then he puts on liturgical garments and orders some clergy to do the same. And thus, wearing the mitre and the episcopal insignia, he sets out from the city with all his clergy in exile, to face the tyrant's camp, to appease his wrath with the greatest humility. (...) The tyrant, who saw his arrival from afar, by God's grace, was seized with such great fear that, leaping from his tent, he ran as fast as he could to meet the bishop, fell face down on the ground, and as if recognizing something divine in the bishop and honoring in him the Eternal Shepherd, begged for forgiveness for his actions. Bishop Tomasz, raising him from the ground, tearfully promised to forgive him all the apostasy he had committed, as long as he persevered in this contrition and piety. And after mutual tearful embraces and kisses, the prince and the bishop entered the nearest church of St. Nicholas without witnesses.

As a commemoration of this reconciliation between Bishop Tomasz II of Wrocław and Duke Henry Probus, a monument called Unity was erected in Stara Wieś. It was also then that the chapel received the rare dedication of St. Thomas Becket, whose relics were probably brought to the castle. At the collegiate church, three canons and several vicars served, their livelihood supported by tithes from several villages in the duchies of Racibórz, Opole, and Cieszyn. In addition, the clergy at the collegiate church served as chancellors, secretaries, as well as tutors and educators to the duke's children. In the early 14th century, a wing of the duke's castle was added to the chapel. In 1309, the altar of St. Margaret was mentioned. In the 14th century, the chapel was further expanded with a porch. In 1416, at the behest of John II, the chapter was transferred from the castle chapel to the parish church. In the 15th and 16th centuries, many of the revenues of the chapel disappeared, as Augustin Weltzel mentions:

As for the chapel's revenues, many of them completely disappeared in the 15th and 16th centuries. However, if the parsons, like the custodians and scholastics, faithfully remained here and did not stray from their flock, their income would be better represented. Before leaving abroad, Count Karol Sobeck established in his will of 1739 a fund of 1,000 guilders for the castle vicar, who would receive accommodation and sustenance in the castle, serve in the chapel, and annually celebrate a requiem for all deceased subjects of the duchy, and established the feast day of St. John of Nepomuk (May 16) as a holiday for the entire duchy.

In 1519, due to a fire that broke out in the castle, the chapel suffered the most damage, with the southern wall and vaults collapsing. After the fire in 1519, the collapsed southern wall was rebuilt, and the vaults were reconstructed, with the upper level lowered. Additionally, a sacristy was added on the southern side. Even after the castle passed into the hands of the Austrians, masses continued to be held in the chapel. This fact is mentioned by Augustin Weltzel:

After the extinction of the Piast dynasty of the Opole and Racibórz duchies in 1532, they passed to the Austrian house as kings of Bohemia. Although later, due to the sale, the castle was separated from the duchy, the emperor retained the patronage rights, and the hereditary owners received only demesne estates, but not the privileges of founders. Both masses were to be celebrated in the presence of the duke, but now they are performed with greater benefit and with a larger congregation in the town church, one at 7:00 AM (matins), the other at 9:00 AM (high mass).

Every year, four solemn processions with the martyr's relics proceeded to the chapel. The first took place on December 29, the feast day of the patron saint, St. Thomas. The second procession went to the chapel on Tuesdays during Rogation days or Maundy Thursday, while the third took place on the eve of the feast of St. John the Baptist. The last procession fell on the feast day of St. Marcellus I, the patron of Racibórz, and was established in commemoration of the foundation of the collegiate church. However, as they coincided with market days, it was conducted around the market square to the Dominican monastery. When the castle was owned by individuals of different denominations than Catholicism, such as George von Brandenburg, Jan Zygmunt Bathori, and Bethlen Gabor, masses could not be held in the chapel. From 1542 to 1629, processions, except for the Corpus Christi procession, did not take place, which was conducted in the presence of armed citizens and the chapter. An urbarium from 1595 describes the chapel as follows:

At the entrance, there is a gate building and a wooden chamber, next to it, an old entrance to the castle. Right nearby stands the church with a sacristy, which, however, threatens to collapse; underneath it, there are chambers and an attic. Under the church is a vaulted room and a prison.

By the end of the 16th century, the technical condition of the building had significantly deteriorated: the roof had not been repaired, the chapel had subsided, and the object, along with the sacristy, had numerous cracks, and the altars had collapsed. This was mainly due to the large space, which lacked a vault, located below the church, and the beams separating the rooms were rotten. In 1594, the castle was inspected by an imperial commission, which proposed the demolition of the chapel. In the 17th century, during the reconstruction of the castle, the facade of the chapel acquired a Baroque appearance. In 1609, the castle was acquired by Baron von Mettich, who undertook to rebuild the church. It was probably then that a side extension was built in place of the porch. Additionally, he promised not to limit the former endowments for the local priests, and the chasubles, chalices, and monstrances were to be returned to the Church. In 1637, another fire broke out at the castle, which also affected the chapel. The reconstruction probably lasted from 1642 to 1651, resulting in a barrel-vaulted ceiling with lunettes above the crypt. In addition, the western bay was shortened, and the facade was rebuilt in the Baroque style. An urbarium from 1642 mentions a clock on the chapel tower. In 1642, the castle and the church were taken over by George von Oppersdorff. In 1670, through the efforts of George von Oppersdorff, the building was renovated, which, according to the land register, had been desecrated during the Thirty Years' War:

[The chapel] completely deteriorated during the wars and became impure, but, thanks to the holy memory of Count George von Oppersdorff, it was restored in honor of Almighty God and St. Thomas Becket.

During the reconstruction of the chapel, new windows, benches, oratories, matronea, and an altar were created. In 1687, a baptism ceremony took place in the church for a Turk and a Turkess. The Turk named Mahomet took on a new name, Theophilus, and his godparents were Bernard von Oppersdorff, Wenceslaus von Reiswitz, and his wife. The Turkess assumed the names Barbara Antonina Eufrazja, and her godparents were the von Reiswitz couple and George von Oppersdorff.

At the turn of the 17th and 18th centuries, several aristocratic weddings were held in the chapel. On 29 March 1688, Baron of Karol Gabriel von Węgierski and Countess Benigna Ester Praschma were united in holy matrimony by Scholaster Frederick Ferdinand Flade. Witnesses at this ceremony included Count Jan Jerzy von Oppersdorff, Countess Marianna von Hohenems, Count Bernard von Praschma, Frederick von Oppersdorff, and his son Frederick. On 12 February 1713, Baron Teofil von Tracha and Countess Helena Sobeck, daughter of Count Karol Henryk Sobeck, were married, and the ceremony was officiated by Abbot Józef Bernard von Strachwitz.

In the 18th century, the chapel ceased to hold religious services despite such an obligation in the founding document. This fact was met with a sharp reaction from the imperial authorities. The whole situation was described by Augustin Weltzel:

At the end of 1731, an imperial decree was issued to all churches in Silesia, according to which all privileges granted by the founders had to be submitted for approval by the imperial court within six months, under the penalty of invalidation if not submitted within the specified time. The county governor (Landeshauptmann) reported to the superior office (Oberamt), and on 26 June 1732, the emperor was informed by Count Franz Anton Schaffgotsch and Lazarus von Brunetti about the cessation of daily masses and annual processions, which were endowed in the castle chapel to honor St. Thomas Becket, depriving the local pastor of various incomes, which were taken over by the chapter. Charles VI, or rather the highest chancellor of Czechia, Francis Ferdinand Count Kinsky, on 25 August 1733, summoned the royal superior office in the Upper and Lower Silesia duchies to demand from the members of the chapter a proper justification for why they had discontinued the daily services in the castle chapel against the literal content of the founding document and to present a relevant report as soon as possible. The superior office (Count Franz Anton Schaffgotsch and Lazarus von Brunetti) addressed the general vicariate, and it (Baron Jan von Redinghoven and Baron Adam Joseph von Keller) on September 12, turned to the chapter in Racibórz to submit the documents within two weeks.

On 24 November 1733, the Racibórz chapter responded to the letter sent by the imperial authorities. According to the chapter, the two endowed masses had not been celebrated in the chapel for over 200 years, but their intentions were carried out in the parish church. In 1852, a description of the castle chapel was published in the architectural monthly Zeitschrift für Bauwesen:

The chapel is part of the old Piast Castle, which, built in an irregular shape, has only partially survived, as the wing towards the Oder river collapsed. Due to its strong walls, the castle served more as a fortress than as a decoration. The chapel, with its noble and pure Gothic style, undoubtedly fascinates every art lover. From the outside, squeezed between two buildings, the church does not make the best impression, with a Baroque gable closed on both sides by the roof. However, the interior is all the more beautiful, measuring 37.5 feet in length, 20 feet in width, and 44 feet in height. The boldest cross vault rises on slender columns and bundles of shafts. Ten windows and window niches, two large windows in the rear wall, and two smaller ones above the door divide the walls with graceful lines and give the chapel a free, airy look. To the left of the entrance, in the wall between four columns (three connected each), there are nine niches next to each other, which, at a height of 11 feet above the floor, were used for placing sculptures. Both the profiles of the niches and columns, vaults, and arches are of the finest shape. The right side seems to have suffered from the fire. The main altar and two side altars with modest gilding are not particularly ornate. During the castle fire in January 1858, part of the vault collapsed, but it was rebuilt by the builder Starck, and the chapel was adorned with a spire. The main decoration, beautiful stone window works, were made a few years later, however, the wooden altar and organ were erected in 1873. The restored castle chapel was consecrated on 18 October 1876.

In 1858, another fire broke out, sparing no part of the chapel. The western span of the building collapsed as a result of the fire. After the fire, a brewery was built, followed by the reconstruction of the chapel (lasting until 1873), overseen by Juliusz Starcke. During the reconstruction works, the interior of the building was modernized, and the western facade of the exterior was redesigned in the Neo-Gothic style. Triangular gables were added to the eastern and western elevations. Additionally, the gable of the western facade transitioned into a spire, crowned with a pyramid. Inside the church, space was made for a musical choir loft, supported by two columns. In 1873, a Neo-Gothic wooden altar of St. Thomas Becket, likely crafted by Adalbert Siekinder from Munich, along with a painting of the patron by Jan Bochenek and organs, were installed in the chapel. A few years later, the interior was enriched with stonework. The three-part windows were adorned with tracery. The consecration of the chapel took place on October 18 of the same year.

During World War II, the chapel did not suffer significant damage. On 5 December 1953, the church, along with the entire castle complex, was listed as a historic monument. However, due to the lack of interest from the authorities, the building gradually deteriorated from the early 1950s onwards. It was during this time that the altar, organs, and benches in the chapel were destroyed. From 1985 to 1987, archaeological and architectural work was conducted in the church by B. Muzolf and Z. Hejda. In 1988, an agreement was reached between the city and church authorities that the renovated chapel would be used for religious worship. In the 1990s, through the efforts of the city authorities, the facade was renovated, and conservation work was carried out on the stonework of the windows in the church. The chapel is currently owned by the State Treasury, and the facility is under the administration of the Racibórz County authorities. On 3 June 2001, at 12:00 PM, after a long hiatus, a Mass was celebrated in front of the church, presided over by Father Jerzy Hetmańczyk, the parson of St. John the Baptist Parish. However, the chapel is not currently in use.

== Architecture ==
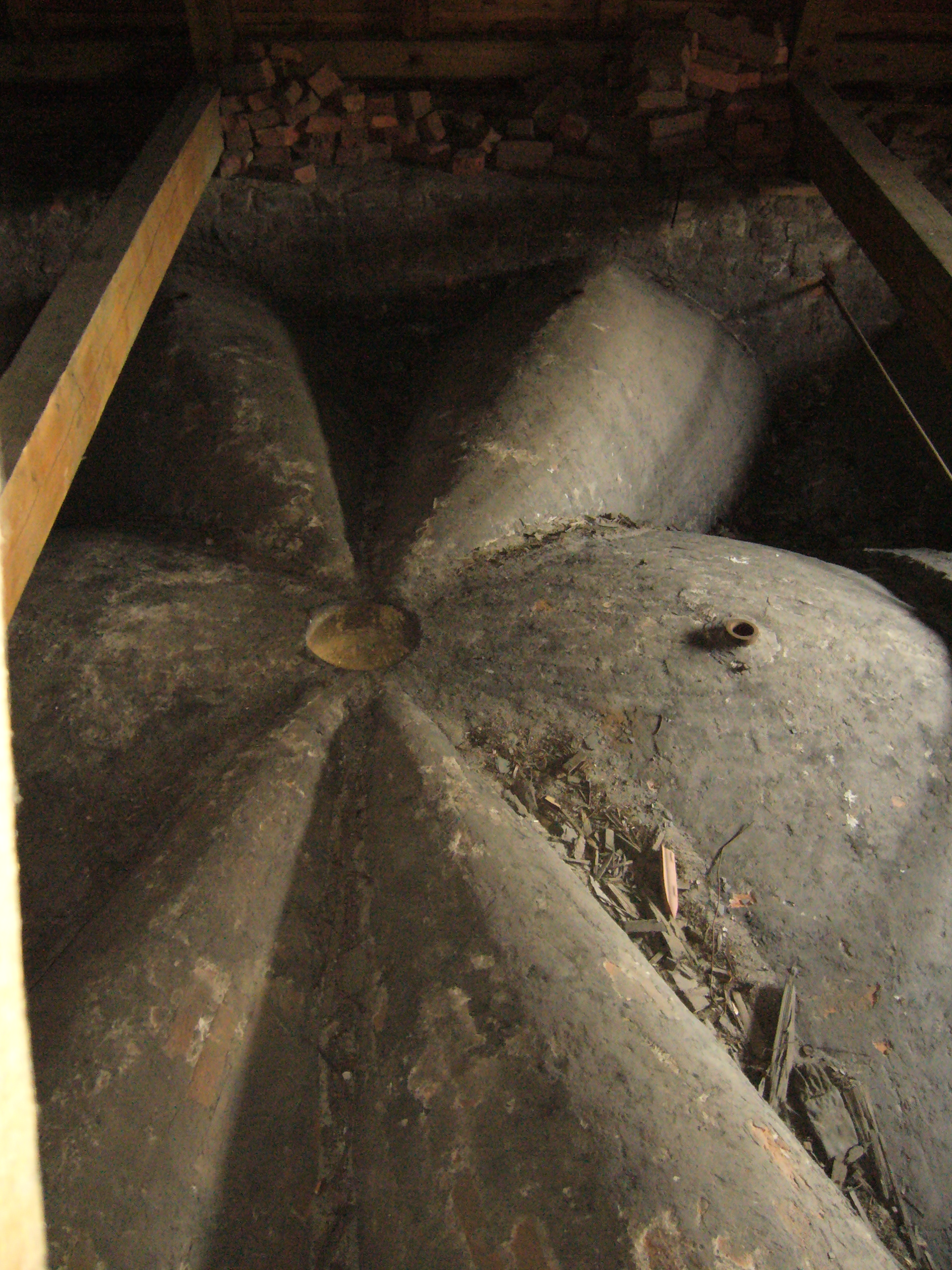
Construction of the chapel vault – view from the attic

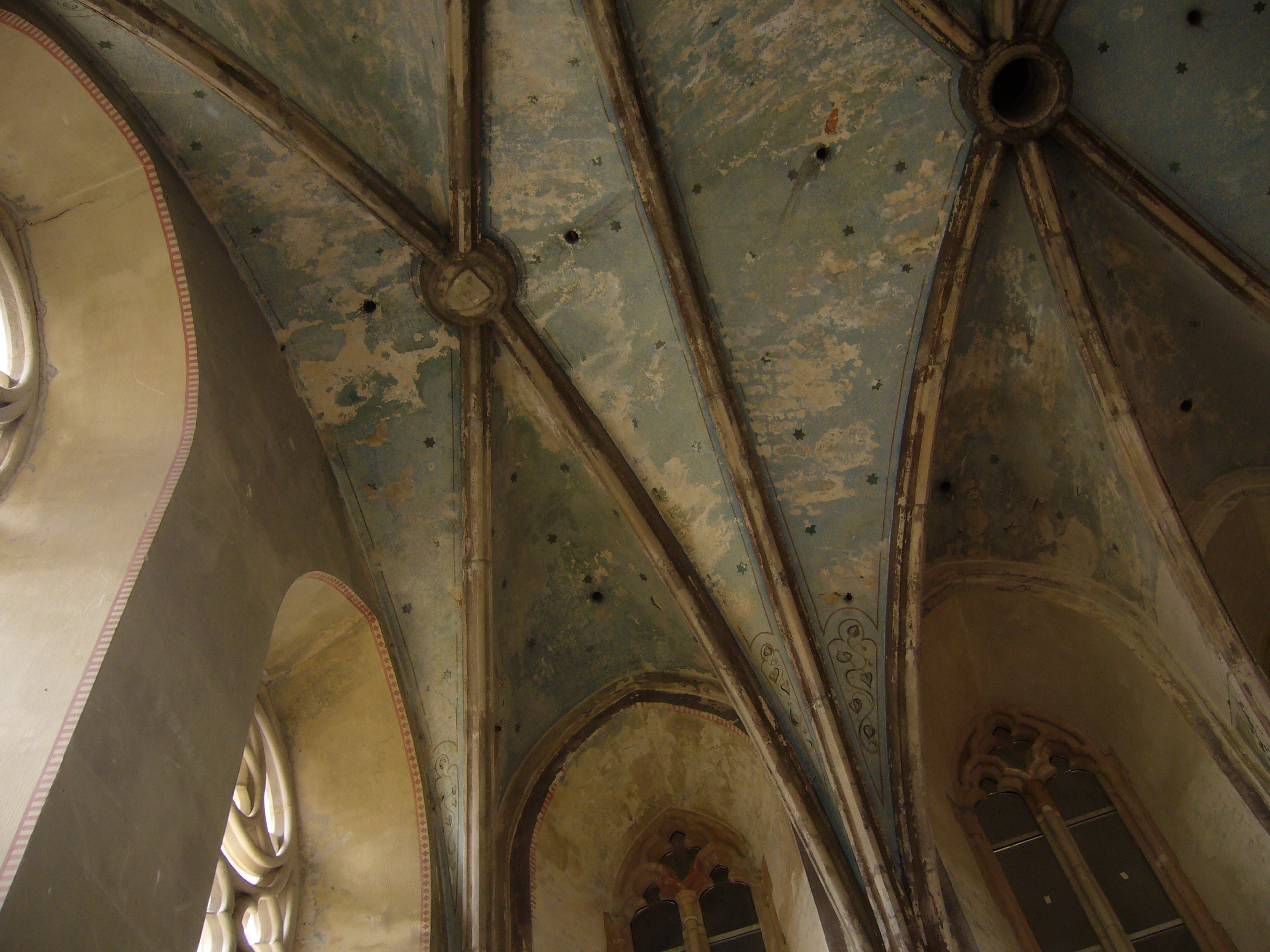
Fragment of the vault with remnants of painted decorations

The temple, along with the castle house, was added to the first section of the walls from the east. It is located in the eastern wing of the castle, between the gate building and the main castle buildings. The chapel stands on the foundations of the previous temple. Initially freestanding, it is erected on a rectangular plan measuring 8.5 by 13 meters, oriented, built of brick in the Wendish work, plastered, and has stone details from hewing. The chapel was the first freestanding religious building built on a rectangular plan.

The chapel is of the aisleless type, three-bay, cross-ribbed vaulted. The western bay (Neo-Gothic) is slightly narrower than the others, the vault of the central bay is six-part, and the eastern bay is seven-part and has a transverse rib on the axis of the eastern wall. In the keystone there is a Neo-Gothic heraldic cartouche. The ribs of the eastern and central bays date from the turn of the 15th and 16th centuries, with a profile in the form of a roll with a break. The ribs flow into columnettes with chalice capitals from the late 13th century in the corners and the north wall. The capitals are decorated with floral and flower motifs. Triple shaft bundles are located between the bays. The southern wall has shafts from the turn of the 15th and 16th centuries. The shafts are profiled and have corniced capitals. The shafts on the north side are cantilevered on brackets decorated with plant motifs, probably partially reconstructed in the 19th century. The shafts on the southern side reach the cornice, which runs around the interior at the height of the window sills.

The chapel windows are divided and have tracery. The side walls of the eastern and central bays have two two-part pointed-arch windows, while the eastern wall has two three-part windows with tracery. There is also tracery with a fish bladder motif on the eastern wall, which was probably reconstructed. The windows on the north side have tracery with a trefoil motif, also partially reconstructed. There are sedilia niches under the windows. Between the shafts in the eastern part of the north wall there are 3 niches, which are closed with trefoil and surrounded by richly profiled frames, the closures of which are slightly cantilevered. Triangular wimpergs with stylized crockets and crosses are present in the crowning. At the base of the sedilia there is a cornice. In the middle bay on the north side there is a passage to the castle. In the western part there is a matroneum half the width of the bay. The chapel is surrounded by buttresses with a stone cornice.

The chapel has a two-story layout, connected by stairs in the wall from the east. The upper level served liturgical purposes. There is a Neo-Gothic, brick choir supported by two columns. The lower level served as either the tomb oratory of Przemysław and his family or as a place for storing holy relics, functioning as a sanctuary. The first purpose seems unlikely, as after the death of Przemysław, he was buried in the Dominican monastery in Racibórz. The crypt under the chapel has a ribbed vault from the second half of the 17th century supported on two pillars and on chalice-shaped corbels located in the perimeter walls. In the western part there is a church porch.

In the crypt there was a tombstone of Joanna Wilhelmina Ihlee née Gröschner (died 1790). The slab was marble, had an inscription, and the ornamental top depicted the sun. In addition, the chapel housed six pewter lanterns from the first half of the 19th century. In the museum in Racibórz there is a painting of St. Thomas Becket from the altar and statues of the apostles that adorned the dismantled canon sedilia.

On the outside of the building, in the eastern corners and also at the western bay, there are trusks. The western facade of the building is Neo-Gothic, with a portal and a gable that turns into a tower topped with a spire. The chapel is covered with a saddle roof with sheet metal.

Since the mid-19th century, the castle chapel has been called the Pearl of Silesian Gothic due to its high artistic level. It is also called the Silesian Sainte-Chapelle.

== Chapter ==
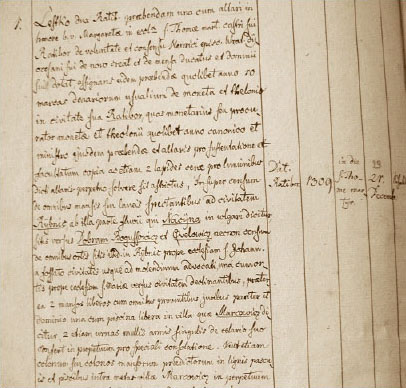
Document by Duke Leszek from 1309, which mentions foundations for the altar of St. Margaret in the castle collegiate church

Bishop of Wrocław, Tomasz II, founded a collegiate church at the castle chapel in 1288, where three canons and several vicars served. The first canon at the castle church was Tylco, who served from 1293 to 1305. He is mentioned in documents of Duke Mieszko I and Przemysław of Racibórz. After 1305, a canon named Godin is mentioned in documents. Przemysł I had a chaplain named Jeszko, who in 1295 was also titled as a canon, and later in 1299 as the pastor of Rybnik. Documents from 1290 also mention a chaplain named Otto. From the names of the clergy, it can be inferred that they originated from Western Europe. The bishop and the duke endowed the canon prebends with tithes collected from villages belonging to the Duchy of Cieszyn and Racibórz.

In the 14th century, it is likely that none of the three canons resided in the castle anymore, because Bishop Przecław of Pogorzela obligated at least one canon to stay at the castle for a period of one year. Their task was to guard the relics, equipment, and liturgical vestments. In 1308, Duke Leszek of Racibórz became the founder of a prebend from the altar of St. Margaret, and also transferred judicial power over the colonists living in the castle settlement to the canons. On February 27, 1359, Bishop Przecław decided that the canons of the castle chapel would be directly subject to the authority of the Bishopric of Wrocław. In addition, the bishop determined the appearance of their attire and ordered them to appear before the Wrocław chapter annually during the commemoration of St. Thomas. They were also required to report on the activities of Bishop Tomasz II's foundation. The bishop, for his part, undertook to protect the legal rights of the canons, the chapel, and its possessions. Everything was recorded in a special document, which emphasized the great importance of the Racibórz collegiate church at the local castle.

In 1416, the chapter was moved to the parish church. At that time, it was served by five prelates, twelve canons, and a host of vicars. The reason for changing the location of the chapter was that the city had greater significance than the castle at that time. According to Augustin Weltzel:

There was great zeal in establishing canonries to have a magnificent chapter. The castle chapel was insufficient for this purpose; moreover, canons and vicars living in the city had difficulty in punctually and promptly performing their duties due to the closure of the city and castle gates. When fourteen canonries were already established, the duke decided to request the bishop to transfer the collegiate chapter from the castle chapel to the parish church.

== Schneider's map ==
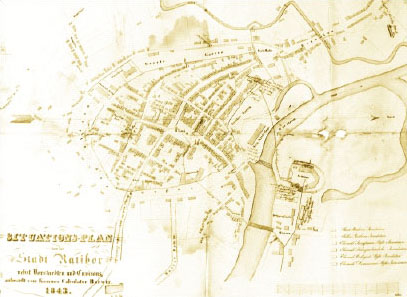
Schneider's map with a hand-drawn underground passage under the Oder river

In 1988, the city authorities, along with the Catholic Church, reached an agreement regarding the renovation of the castle chapel. During the renovation work, a map dating back to 1843 was found in the small tower on the spire. The map depicted the urban development of the city in 1843 and 1858, thanks to handwritten annotations.

The map became a historical discovery due to the annotations made by Robert Schneider, who likely oversaw the reconstruction of the castle after the fire. He marked on the map an underground tunnel that started at the site of the old castle tower and ended at the Dominican convent. This was probably the legendary passage under the Oder river described by Hyckel.

== Relics ==
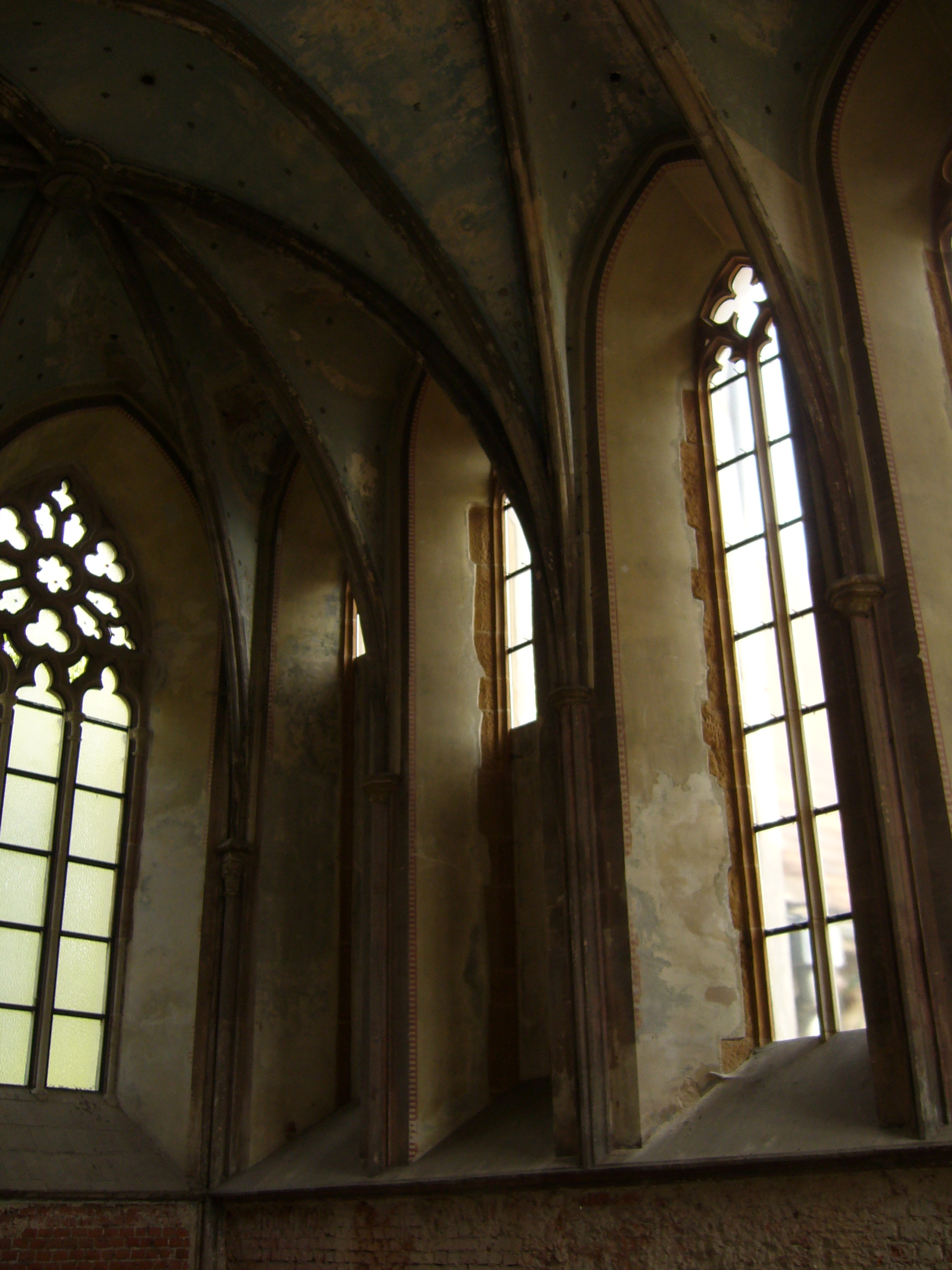
Fragment of the interior, on the left there is a large window in the back wall of the chapel

In the chapel, there were likely relics of saints placed in the lower chamber. Although in 1416 the collegiate chapter was transferred to the parish church, daily Masses were still held in the castle chapel, and four times a year a solemn procession to honor the relics kept there took place.

The first saint whose relics may have been in the chapel was its English patron, Thomas Becket. This might have been dictated by the custom of displaying the garments or bones of patrons in special places within the churches. Obtaining the relics of St. Thomas was not difficult in those times, as the Canterbury Cathedral was one of the largest pilgrimage sites.

Another saint whose relics might have been in the castle chapel was Stanislaus of Szczepanów. This could be explained by the reverence shown to this saint by the rulers of Racibórz – Vladislaus I and Przemysław. Jan Długosz mentions Przemysław's piety in the Annals or Chronicles of the Famous Kingdom of Poland:

Each year, to honor him [St. Stanislaus] on his birthday, he [Przemysł] usually carried from Racibórz Castle to the Dominican monastery a candle so large that it exceeded his strength. (...) When he [Przemysł] lay in his last sickness, St. Stanislaus appeared to him and, having kindly comforted him, admonished him to prepare for the observance of his feast. To his reply: 'How can I do that when I am weak and pressed down by a severe illness?' the saint of God added: 'I will help you,' he says, 'and add strength'. Duke Przemysł promised that he would do this, and he died childless on the vigil of St. Stanislaus. He was buried on his feast day, although two of his brothers: Prince Kazimierz of Bytom and Prince Mieszko of Cieszyn, as well as the lords of Racibórz, were strongly opposed to it and wanted to keep his body longer to arrange the funeral on another day. Since the dukes and lords changed their minds, he was buried in the Dominican monastery in Racibórz, to celebrate the feast of St. Stanislaus not every year, but continuously in the future.

The relics might also have come from the ancient Romanesque rotunda that presumably stood in the place of the current chapel. Consideration is given to fragments of the True Cross, which relics were very popular at the time. In the treasury of the parish church, there is even a Renaissance pax with glazed pieces of the True Cross.

However, the authenticity of the relics is doubtful because there are no records confirming their existence. It is assumed that they probably were destroyed during the fire in 1519. The scenario of the relics being destroyed during the Reformation, when the castle was owned by George the Pious Hohenzollern, is also considered. Augustin Weltzel mentions relics in the 19th century.

== Bibliography ==
- Wawoczny, Grzegorz (2002). Zamek w Raciborzu (in Polish). Racibórz: Wydawnictwo i Agencja Informacyjna WAW. ISBN 83-912030-8-5.
- Newerla, Paweł (2008). Dzieje Raciborza i jego dzielnic (in Polish). Racibórz: Wydawnictwo i Agencja Informacyjna WAW. ISBN 978-83-89802-73-6.
- Wawoczny, Grzegorz (2003). Weekend w Bramie Morawskiej (in Polish). Racibórz: Wydawnictwo i Agencja Informacyjna WAW. ISBN 83-917453-4-1.
- Chrzanowski, Tadeusz; Kornecki, Marian (1967). Katalog zabytków sztuki w Polsce. Województwo opolskie. Powiat raciborski (in Polish). Vol. VII. Warsaw: Instytut Sztuki Polskiej Akademii Nauk.
- Wawoczny, Grzegorz (2007). Zabytki powiatu raciborskiego (in Polish). Racibórz: Wydawnictwo i Agencja Informacyjna WAW. ISBN 978-83-89802-36-1.
- Muzolf, Błażej (1995). "Kaplica zamkowa pw. św. Tomasza Kantauryjskiego". In Mroczko, Teresa; Arszyński, Marian (eds.). Architektura gotycka w Polsce (in Polish). Vol. 2. Warsaw: Instytut Sztuki PAN.
- Mandziuk, Józef (2004). Historia Kościoła katolickiego na Śląsku. Średniowiecze (in Polish). Vol. II. Warsaw: Studia Theologica Varsaviensia.
