= Racibórz Castle =

1108 castle in Racibórz, Poland

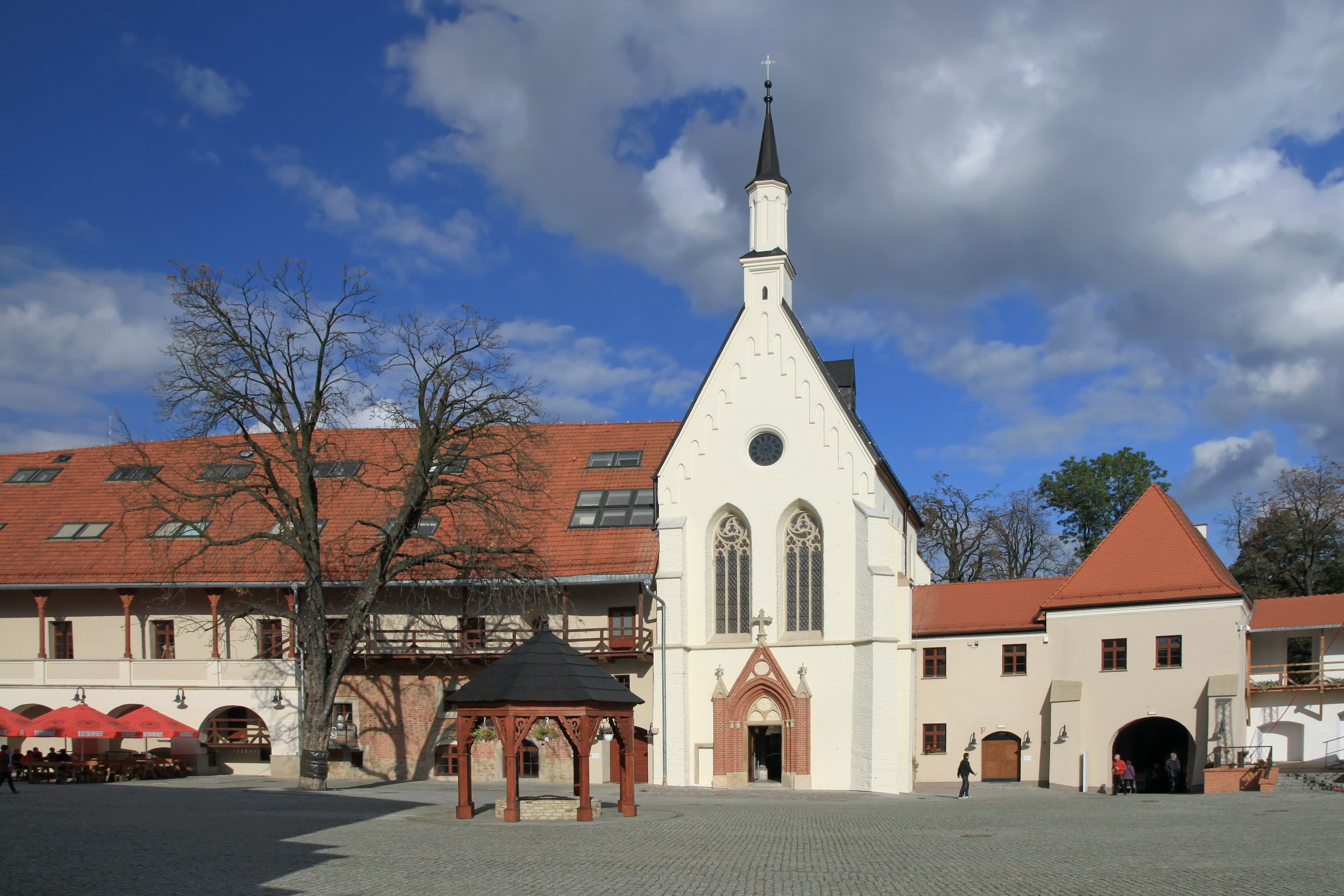
- East wing from the courtyard side

- Location within Poland

General information
- Type: castle
- Location: Zamkowa Street; 47-400 Racibórz, Racibórz, Poland
- Coordinates: 50°5′46″N 18°13′14″E
- Construction started: 1108

Racibórz Castle is a stronghold mentioned in Gesta principum Polonorum of Gallus Anonymus in an entry dated to the year 1108. The first brick sections were likely built around the mid-13th century.

== History ==
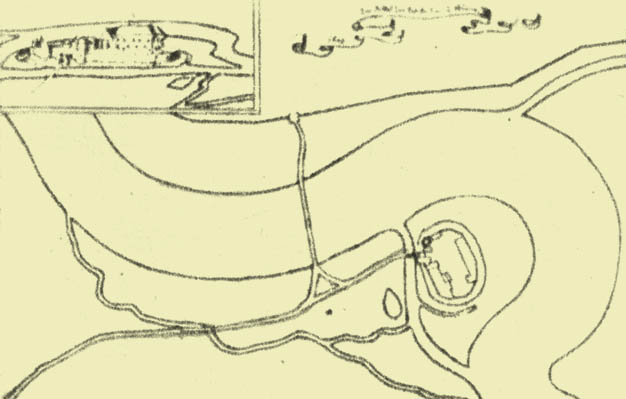
Location plan of the castle in 1609 according to W. Sabisch

It is speculated that the first mention of the Racibórz stronghold dates back to around 845 in a text known as the Bavarian Geographer. It mentions the Golensizi tribe inhabiting the Upper Oder Basin, which had five strongholds. Based on research, it is presumed that one of these strongholds was Racibórz. It is also assumed that it could have been Eburium, the legendary capital of the Quadi. The Latin work Commentarius belli adversum Turcas ad Viennam... by Wespazjan Kochowski, which discusses John III Sobieski's expedition to Vienna, describes the 24th of August, the day when the king arrived at the Racibórz Castle, as follows:

From Tarnowskie Góry through Gliwice and Rudy, marching along the road amidst forests to Racibórz, where once was the capital of the Quadi, and later the seat of Polish princes of royal blood, where after passing through, heavy troops were left under the care of Hetman Jabłonowski, and the king, along with a strong army, swiftly entered Austrian territory.

Wespazjan Kochowski also mentions Racibórz in the poem Dzieło Boskie albo Pieśni Wiednia wybawionego published in 1684, where in chapter XLVII one can read:

Here [in Tarnowskie Góry] briefly pausing, he [the king] moved where the Quadi once had their capital in Racibórz, from there through the Moravian mountains leading into the land of the Marcomanni, further to Olomouc (...)

F.A. Larisch, a German regionalist, believed that Claudius Ptolemy mentioned Racibórz. Władysław K. Zieliński also mentions this in his work Szląsk (pruski) słowem i ołówkiem na podstawie najnowszych źródeł przedstawiony published in 1889:

According to Count Larisch, Racibórz was already known as Eburium under Ptolemy, as the capital of the Buri of the tribe of the Suevi [which was the name for the Quadi who invaded Italy and Spain]. This name was probably transformed by the later Slavic inhabitants into Hrad-Ebur or Hrad-Ibur, from which the present name Racibórz (Hrad-Rad-Rac-ibor) originated.

=== From 11th to 12th century ===
Around the year 1000, there was supposed to be a border fortress in Racibórz. Around 1038, the Racibórz fortress, like the entire Silesia, fell under Czech rule. The Racibórz Castle is first mentioned in Gesta principum Polonorum of Gallus Anonymus in an entry dated 1108. At that time, there was a border castle here. According to the information contained there, the stronghold belonged to the Moravians, and the knights of Bolesław III Wrymouth entered it without a fight, having previously defeated Moravian knights who set out from the stronghold. Racibórz was then a very important stronghold in the defensive system of the Polish-Czech border, so its establishment can be associated with the construction of border fortresses during the conflict between the Piasts and the Premyslids (11th–12th century), rather than with the Golensyts tribe. According to Gallus Anonymus:

When Bolesław was guarding the country and striving with all his might for the glory of the homeland, it so happened that the Moravians appeared, wanting to preoccupy the Koźle stronghold in secret from the Poles. At that time, Bolesław sent certain noble knights to occupy, if possible, Racibórz, but he himself did not give up hunting and rest for this reason. These noble knights went away and fought with the Moravians, in which several noble Poles fell in battle, but their comrades took possession of the field of victory and the stronghold. Thus, the Moravians were defeated in battle, and those in the stronghold, unaware of anything, were captured.

From 1108 to the beginning of the 14th century, the castle was under the rule of the Piasts. Until the first half of the 14th century, a castellan resided here, and from the end of the 14th century until 1743, it was also the seat of the Racibórz district starosta. From 1172, the castle was also a princely residence. During the reign of Bolesław III Wrymouth, the fortress was one of the important strongholds defending the southern border of the Polish state. Karol Maleczyński dates the founding of the stronghold to the second half of the 10th century, which was corroborated by archaeological research conducted in the castle courtyard. This location was not chosen randomly, as it utilized the natural bend of the Oder river, which was cut off by a river branch to create an island, later called the Racibórz Island. One could get to it via a levee, which is now the route of Zamkowa Street. In 1146, Władysław II the Exile resided at the Racibórz Castle, who was expelled by his brothers. In 1172, Mieszko IV Tanglefoot chose Racibórz as the capital of his principality. His brother, Bolesław I the Tall received Lower Silesia and Opole, while Mieszko received the principality of Racibórz after their father, Władysław II the Exile. During his reign, Racibórz Castle flourished. In 1689, Fryderyk Lucae, a Silesian chronicler, mentions the ruler:

There is also the ancient princely castle, which the supreme Polish prince Mieszko [Tanglefoot] built with his wife in 1177, out of concern for his subjects, which stands firmly above the Oder and shines more with ancient monuments than with elegance.

=== From 13th to 15th century ===
During the reign of Mieszko IV Tanglefoot, a mint producing bracteates with the inscription MILOST (meaning honor or respect) has been operating in the castle since around 1200. This inscription was one of the earliest examples of the Polish language on coins. However, Borys Paszkiewicz argues that this bracteate is a Lower Silesian coin, and the inscription MILOST may have Czech origins. During Mieszko's rule, a Romanesque castle chapel was also built, which was probably the oldest place of spreading the Christian faith in the Racibórz land. In 1201, as a result of the death of his brother and his son Jarosław, Mieszko took over Opole, creating the Opole-Racibórz Duchy. Racibórz was then the seat of the duchy's court, as indicated by the ruler's title (dux Ratibor, dux Raceburgensis).

In 1211, after the death of Tanglefoot, his son Casimir I took over power in the castle, and during his reign, Opole gained significance, becoming the capital of the duchy. Before 1217, the duke established the left-bank part of Racibórz under Flemish law. After Casimir's death, the regents ruled the duchy, first Henry the Bearded, then the widow of Prince Casimir, Duchess Wiola. In 1222, the Racibórz castellan – Stoigniew – took over. Around 1238, the underage Mieszko became the lord of the Opole-Racibórz Duchy, who resided more often in Racibórz, as indicated by the number of documents issued in this city. Sources indicate a strong fortification of the stronghold, surrounded by a wooden-earth rampart, additionally bordered by the Oder river from the south and its branches from the other sides. The stronghold's fortification is evidenced by the repulsion of the Mongol attack in January 1241. This event is associated with the Racibórz legend of the Mongol leader Tin-fu. According to legend, the alleged castellan, Bartek Lasota, along with a company of warriors, confronted a larger Tatar horde. One of the warriors fatally wounded the Mongolian leader in the throat with an arrow shot from the castle, which contributed to the fleeing besieging troops. To commemorate this event, Mieszko II the Fat commissioned the carving of the Mongolian leader's head in stone, which until World War II was located at the corner, in the southeast wing of the castle, and now is in the Racibórz Museum. In 1246, the lord of the duchy became Duke Vladislaus I, who also resided more often in the Racibórz Castle. In 1249, the Racibórz stronghold was besieged by the troops of the Olomouc bishop, Bruno von Schauenburg. It was a retaliation for Vladislaus' earlier raid on the Opava land. Attempts to capture the stronghold failed, but the troops burned the city, and Vladislaus had to pay 3,000 silver coins.

After the death of Duke Vladislaus (1281/1282), the castle fell to his youngest son Przemysław. During his time, the castle was rebuilt, and brick buildings were erected, including the castle chapel. From 1285 to 1287, the Wrocław bishop, Tomasz II, resided in the Racibórz stronghold, and got into conflict with the Wrocław duke Henry Probus. In 1288, Tomasz II founded a collegiate chapter at the castle chapel, which was an expression of gratitude for the hospitality shown. This event was described by Jan Długosz in the Chronicles of the Famous Kingdom of Poland:

Having gathered a great army consisting of both his own soldiers and mercenaries hired for a monetary contribution, which he exacted as a punishment from the Wrocław church, he militarily invaded the lands of Duke Casimir of Opole and besieged the city of Racibórz due to the presence of Wrocław bishop Tomasz and his clergy therein. Although the wealthier citizens of Racibórz endured the siege for some time and pledged to endure it even longer, the surprised populace, feeling scarcity and lack of food, tormented by hunger, cried constantly, lamented loudly, and sighed, hurling curses and insults at Bishop Tomasz and his clergy. Moved by this, Bishop Tomasz, known for his great kindness, which he allegedly always displayed, said: "Rather let me and my clergy fall into the hands of the tyrant than these innocents perish from hunger. We will immediately free from danger those people who, besieged, are dying from fear and hunger. Let us ward off the destruction threatening this city, which has nourished us and provided us shelter for a long time, either by our imprisonment or – if it pleases God – by our death. Then he put on his liturgical garments and ordered some of the clergy to do the same. And so, in his liturgical vestments and with episcopal insignia, he left the city with all his clergy in exile and proceeded to the tyrant's camp to appease his wrath with the greatest humility. (...) The tyrant, who saw him coming from afar, by the grace of God, was seized with such great fear that he rushed out of his tent as quickly as possible to meet the bishop, fell face down on the ground, and as if seeing something divine in the bishop and revering him as the Eternal Shepherd, begged for forgiveness for his sins. Bishop Tomasz, raising him from the ground, with tears promised to forgive him all his faithlessness, provided that he persevered in this contrition and piety. And after mutual tearful embraces and kisses, the duke and the bishop entered the nearest church of St. Nicholas without witnesses.

At the turn of the 12th and 13th centuries, the fortress was rebuilt into a Gothic-style castle. It was also during this time that the wooden palisade on the ramparts was replaced by a wall with fortified towers. According to archaeological research, the first brick buildings can be dated to the second half of the 13th century. Around 1290, Duke Przemysław of Racibórz commissioned the construction of a Gothic chapel, which was dedicated to St. Thomas Becket. The period of prosperity of the castle coincided with the reign of Duke Przemysław and his son Leszek. The building was surrounded by a settlement of fishermen, millers, and craftsmen, which became the nucleus of the later community of Ostróg. In 1306, when Duke Przemysław died, a physician, Magister Jan, was mentioned at the court. After the death of Duke Przemysław, Leszek of Racibórz became the ruler of the separated Racibórz district.

After the death of Duke Leszek in 1336, the castle passed into the hands of the Opava Přemyslids, namely Nicholas II. This happened because Leszek in 1327 pledged homage to John of Bohemia. Moreover, the duke and his wife Agnieszka, daughter of Henry IV the Faithful, had no children, and the Racibórz Piast line ended with them. These factors, along with the support of the Racibórz patriciate, contributed to the takeover of the duchy by the Přemyslids, who mainly resided in Opava. After the abolition of the office of castellan, the castle was inhabited by the castle commander, referred to in Latin sources as procurator, flodarius, or occasionally wlodarius castri Rathiboriensis. Sources mentioned two Racibórz castle commanders. The first was Jeszko, mentioned in 1305, and the second was Leks or Leksza, appearing in documents from 1317, 1337, and 1343. It cannot be conclusively stated whether the office was abolished after 1343, but it is a fact that no more castle commanders appear in the sources. From 1383 onwards (or shortly before that date), a district starosta resided in the castle, who was in charge of the Racibórz Castle district. This position existed until 1743. During the rule of the Přemyslids, Racibórz lost its significance, and the boundaries of the duchy significantly shrank. In 1416, the collegiate church was transferred to the Church of the Assumption of the Blessed Virgin Mary in Racibórz.

=== 16th century ===
From the 16th century, the stronghold was owned by the King of Bohemia, and then by noble families. In 1521, after the death of the Duke of Opava, Valentine, known as the Hunchback, the rule of the castle was taken over by the Duke of Opole, Jan II the Good. In 1532, after the death of Duke Jan II, Racibórz passed into the hands of the Czech King Ferdinand I. In the same year, the existence of a brewery at the castle was mentioned. Shortly thereafter, it fell into the hands of Margrave George the Pious as collateral for debts amounting to 200,000 guilders owed to the Prague court. Between 1532 and 1533, George renovated the destroyed castle buildings. The profits from the Racibórz estate were used to build a castle in Roth near Nuremberg, which is now called Ratibor. The margrave spread Lutheranism in the Duchy of Racibórz during this time. After repaying the debt to the Hohenzollerns, the castle returned to the possession of the Habsburgs, who entrusted the Duchy of Racibórz to various families. The first owner of the stronghold was Isabella Jagiellon, the daughter of Sigismund I the Old and Bona Sforza. She received the Opole-Racibórz Duchy from Emperor Ferdinand I after relinquishing her rights to the Hungarian crown. In 1556, she renounced her Silesian estates and returned to Hungary.

In 1556, [Isabella] returned to her homeland, the duchies again fell to Emperor Ferdinand I, who managed them through provincial governors. The property of the Racibórz chamber was managed by the imperial councilor and starosta of our duchy, George von Oppersdorff, first on account, later as a pledge for a certain sum loaned to the emperor.

The ownership relations of the castle, along with the rights associated with them and the affiliated lands, were very complex, as evidenced by the fact that from 1532 to 1645, the Opole-Racibórz Duchy had a total of eight rulers. From 1558, the duchy was subordinated to the emperors, and the castle was managed by individuals who received it as a pledge or were only its administrators. From 1564, the Oppersdorffs received the castle from the emperor as collateral for a loan of 60,000 guilders at 6% annually. The duchy then included over 20 villages, and the castle's starosta had an annual income of 3,705 thalers, mainly from folwarks located in Ocice and Miedonia. The only obligation of the count was to maintain the castle guard, his horses, castle servants, including cooks and bakers, and the staff at the folwarks. At that time, the priest received 8 loaves of bread and 8 quarts of beer. The city of Racibórz made efforts to take over the castle estates from Count Oppersdorff and offered the emperor a larger sum of money. As a result of subsequent negotiations, the city was to have the castle estates pledged for another 24 years. In 1574, a fire broke out in the city, which severely damaged it, making it impossible to fulfill its obligations to the emperor. In 1575, the castle estates were taken over by creditors, mainly feudal lords. As compensation for the money paid by the city, the emperor granted it a portion of the Studzienna village. On 22 August 1587, a double election was held for the Polish throne, and one of the elected was Archduke Maximilian II, who stopped and stayed at the Racibórz stronghold on his way to Kraków. An urbarium from 1595 describes the castle as follows:

The castle is surrounded by the Oder, and one of its arms goes towards the sawmill and the castle mill. (...) [The castle] is surrounded by a low wall, which, however, disappeared from the Oder side. At the entrance, there is a gate building and a wooden chamber, and next to it, the old entrance to the castle. Right next to it stands a church with a dressing room sacristy, which, however, threatens to collapse, below it are chambers and an attic. Below the church is a vaulted room and a prison. In addition, one cellar for wine and two vaulted ones for beer, behind them a kitchen pantry and one vaulted cellar. Above the cellar are stairs, a stable, to the right one room, two vaulted rooms, and one bedroom, to the left a large room where court sessions take place, one vaulted room, one small chamber, and a small bedroom. On the upper floor, there is one larger hall, one room, and a bedroom, opposite a cell. The roof is still good, and under it are three empty rooms and an armory. Behind it is a building with a clock, opposite a warehouse, a large kitchen, next to it an alcove, a room, a hall, below a large stable. On the third side, a vaulted bakery and a vestibule, next to two stables, above a room and an alcove and a large attic. Again, an old room and a wooden alcove next to old walls with two warehouses. Everything is covered with shingles. Guards can walk around the castle, but the walls are damaged in many places.

The above urbarium indicates that the castle estate at the time included 26 nearby villages, which were given as pledges.

=== 17th century ===
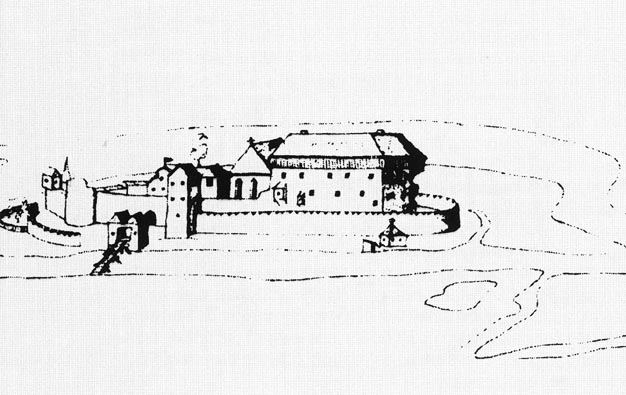
Castle at the beginning of the 17th century

In 1603, 11 villages were sold as hereditary property to various individuals. In 1604, the Duchy of Racibórz, including the castle, came into the hands of the barons Baltazar and Jerzy von Mettich as a pledge for the sum of 116,000 thalers. They rebuilt the castle, and the cost of the work was estimated at 6,000 thalers. In 1609, after paying an additional 28,000 thalers, the castle became the property of the von Mettich barons. In addition to the castle, the Mettich family received sawmills, mills, separate buildings, and various rights. Their estate also included 3 folwarks and 15 villages. At that time, the building was in ruins, and the baron undertook to restore the chapel and not to limit the endowments for the priests who conducted services there. Chasubles, chalices, and monstrances belonging to the castle collegiate church were listed and, according to the chamber records, were to be returned to the Church. In the early 17th century, the castle underwent reconstruction, resulting in the baroque appearance of the chapel facade.

Subsequent owners of the castle included George Frederick, Jan Zygmunt Batory, and, as a result of the Thirty Years' War, from 1622, Gabriel Bethlen, the Prince of Transylvania. In 1628, these properties were acquired by Emperor Ferdinand II for the sum of 130,000 guilders. However, the imperial chamber took possession of these lands only in 1631 due to difficulties in determining the boundaries of the duchy. In 1637, a fire broke out at the castle, and Italian masters were hired for its reconstruction, and they also built the castle in Głogówek. As a result of the work carried out at the castle, the northeast wing was rebuilt, enriched with an arcaded cloister and a loggia on the upper floor. Additionally, the southeast wing was expanded, where a restaurant was located in the second half of the 19th century. The gate tower also acquired a baroque appearance. From 1642, the castle returned to the hands of the Oppersdorf family, specifically to Count George III. These properties were transferred due to the settlement of debts, as Countess von Oppersdorff lent almost 62,000 thalers to Prince von Lichtenstein and 45,000 thalers to the emperor. Additionally, the Oppersdorffs undertook to pay 130,000 thalers within the next three years to take over the duchy as their own. At that time, the estate included the castle and 21 surrounding villages, which had 10 free farms, 21 free peasants, 70 free cottagers, 23 free cottages, 204 serf farmers, and 121 serf peasants. The duchy generated an annual net profit of 18,378 guilders.

In 1645, the Duchy of Racibórz, along with the castle, was pawned to the House of Vasa. In March 1656, King of Poland John II Casimir Vasa appointed Count Franciszek Euzebiusz von Oppersdorff as the governor of the Duchy of Racibórz and Opole. This was a kind of gratitude for the shelter provided by the count to the king and his wife during the Swedish Deluge. In 1666, the Duchy of Racibórz returned to Austria, but Count von Oppersdorff remained its governor until his death in 1691. Subsequent owners included families such as Sobeck, Schlabrendorff, Wlczek, and Reuss von Plauen.

In 1670, the castle and town were visited by Empress Eleonora Gonzaga, who was traveling to Częstochowa for the wedding of her daughter to the King of Poland Michał Korybut Wiśniowiecki. The passage through Silesian lands was supervised by Prince Christian of Brzeg, appointed by Count Franciszek Euzebiusz von Oppersdorff, starosta of the Duchy of Racibórz. Upon arrival, the empress was greeted with a variety of provisions, including 20 oxen, 60 calves, 30 rams, 11 lambs, 12 pigs, venison, 20 buckets of Austrian wine and 14 buckets of Hungarian wine. The list of confectionery products alone was 4 pages long. Count Oppersdorff notified the magistrate that the empress and her entourage would also stay in the city on their way back, this time in three buildings between Panieńska and Rzeźnicza streets.

On 24 August 1683, the castle, owned by Franciszek Euzebiusz Oppersdorff, hosted John III Sobieski, who was heading to Vienna. The king's army consisted of 20 light banners, several hundred dragoons, and many officers, totaling 3,000 men. Sobieski even mentioned his stay in Racibórz in his letters to Marie Casimire Sobieska:

The people here are incredibly kind and bless us, and the land is wonderfully cheerful. (...) Yesterday we were at Count Oppersdorf's castle in Racibórz, but he did not deign to entertain us, only from the imperial chamber. Countess herself brought at least thirty ladies, who sat at the table with us; although she is the younger sister of our lady-in-waiting, she seems to be her mother. A very polite blonde, both in speech and gestures, wonderfully resembling our lady-in-waiting. She has two or three daughters: the eldest married to Mr. von Prazmo, lively and quarrelsome with her husband; the younger, a maiden, charming, similar to the marshal's wife. We played cards before dinner, some older and uglier lady beat me.

Franciszek Euzebiusz Oppersdorff did not want to offend the emperor, so the feast with which he entertained the Polish king was financed with the emperor's money. Before the meal, everyone played Ombre. John III Sobieski did not spend the night at the castle but returned to his camp between Pietrowice Wielkie and Pietraszyn. From 2 AM to 8 PM, the townspeople watched the troops march over the bridge on the Odra river.

=== 18th century ===
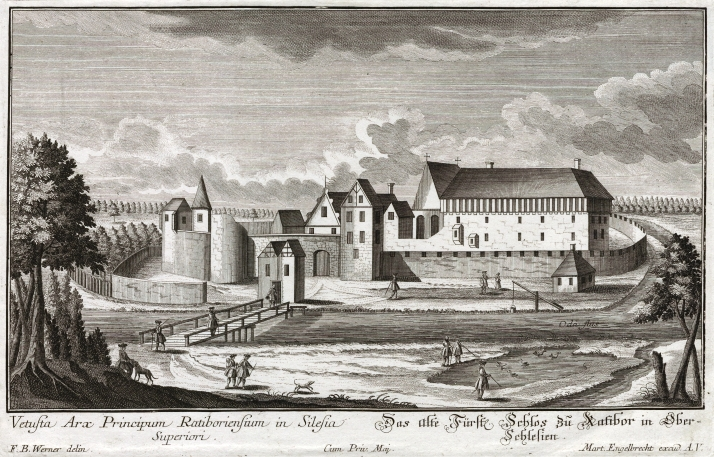
Castle at the turn of the 17th and 18th centuries

After the Oppersdorfs ceased to be the owners of the castle, it passed from hand to hand. The new owners neglected the castle, causing it to deteriorate. In 1712, Franciszek Euzebiusz II von Oppersdorf put Racibórz Castle and its adjacent estates up for sale due to the lack of an heir and the need to make large payments to his sisters. Baron Karol Henryk von Sobeck and Rauthen, the lord of Koszęcin, purchased these estates for the sum of 134,000 thalers. In 1738, the castle passed into the ownership of his son, Karol von Sobeck, who died in 1743. When King Frederick the Great visited Racibórz in June 1742, he stayed at the convent of the Holy Sepulchre in the New Town, which could suggest the poor condition of the building since the king did not choose the castle as his residence.

After Karol's death, the owner of Racibórz Castle was his brother Feliks, and then his son, Jan Nepomucen, who sold these estates in 1776 for 355,000 thalers. They were acquired by Count Ludwik Fryderyk von Schlabrendorf, who, for speculative purposes, also acquired many other Silesian properties. He caused the oak forests belonging to his estates to be cut down, and the timber obtained was sold at high prices to England and France. In 1780, the castle was purchased by Maciej von Wilczek and his wife, Dorota, for 565,000 guilders. However, they were briefly the owners of the estate, and in 1788, they sold it to Count Henryk XLIII Reuß.

The count also did not stay long at Racibórz Castle and sold it to the Prussian state treasury in 1791. In 1799, the Prussian treasury exchanged Racibórz Castle for the Koźle Fortress, which belonged to Count von Plettenberg-Wittem. This exchange was profitable for the count, as the value of the fortress in Koźle was estimated at 400,000 thalers, while that of Racibórz Castle was 600,000 thalers. Shortly thereafter, the count transformed the acquired property into a fief.

=== 19th century ===
Count von Plettenberg-Wittem ruled Racibórz Castle until 1805, when it was taken over by the Prussian minister and chamberlain Wilhelm Ludwig Georg, Prince of Sayn-Wittgenstein. During the Napoleonic Wars, a field hospital for French soldiers was set up in the castle. Sources indicate that between February and May 1808, six soldiers died there. According to findings, the prince was merely the nominal owner of the Racibórz estates, and the entire property was to be transferred to the Elector von Hesse-Kassel. This action was prompted by the fact that the Protestant Kingdom of Prussia did not want to enter into an agreement with the Catholic Prince of Hesse-Kassel. Therefore, the role of intermediary was assumed by the Prince of Sayn-Wittgenstein.

On 1 July 1812, the estate passed into the hands of the Elector Prince for 627,751 thalers. On 6 June 1817, thanks to the efforts of the prince, the estate, which had been a fief, became a sovereign duchy, free from dues. In 1819, the sovereign duchy comprised 65 villages and 30 farms located in the districts of Głubczyce, Koźle, Racibórz, Rybnik, and Toszek-Gliwice. The area was inhabited by 696 peasants, 713 smallholders, and 1,818 cottagers, totaling 18,720 inhabitants. The Prince of Hesse-Kassel visited Racibórz Castle only once, on 3 July 1819. However, he stayed in the city rather than at the castle, as it was in poor condition. The prince received an annual income of 55,000 thalers from the Racibórz estate.

In 1820, the ruler of the principality became Landgrave Victor Amadeus von Hessen-Rothenburg. This happened because Hesse ceded part of its territory to the Kingdom of Prussia, and the landgrave consequently lost his possessions. As partial compensation, he was given the Duchy of Racibórz. On 2 September 1820, Victor Amadeus von Hessen-Rothenburg and his wife, Eliza, née Princess zu Hohenlohe-Langenburg, appeared in Racibórz. The new owners of the castle were hospitably received by the city authorities, who granted them honorary citizenship. On September 27, the landgrave established a chamber to manage his Upper Silesian estates. On 9 June 1821, he received an edict from King Frederick William III of Prussia, elevating the Racibórz estates to the status of a mediate duchy (German: Mediatherzogtum), with the right to a separate vote in the Silesian Landtag. Victor Amadeus von Hessen-Rothenburg decided to reside in Racibórz. However, since the castle was not suitable as a noble residence, he adapted the Cistercian monastery in Rudy as his residence.

In 1834, the landgrave died without heirs. According to his will, the Duchy of Racibórz and Corvey (which he also received in 1820), as well as the Sośnica and Zębowice estates, were inherited by his wife's nephew, Victor Maurice von Hohenlohe-Schillingsfürst. The landgrave's second nephew, Clodwig Charles Victor, received the Treffurt estates and specified income from the Corvey principality. Thus, from the 1830s until 1945, the castle remained in the hands of the Hohenlohe-Schillingsfürst family, who had their residence in nearby Rudy. The castle was inhabited by officials, and the dukes decided to build the Chamber of Racibórz next to it. Established in 1820, the office was tasked with managing the castle estates. The project, drawn up by building inspector Linke, envisaged the building to be erected on the northern side of the present-day Zamkowa Street. In 1840, Victor Maurice von Hohenlohe-Schillingsfürst was granted the title of Herzog von Ratibor by the emperor. From then on, he styled himself Herzog von Ratibor, Fürst von Corvey, Prinz zu Hohenlohe-Schillingsfürst – Durchlaucht. In 1846, a two-story building for the ducal chamber was put into use. In addition to office space, the building also contained several apartments. The first chamber steward was Justice Counselor Frederick Wilhelm Lange, who was replaced by Justice Counselor and retired cavalry captain Gustav Adolf von Wiese-Kaiserswaldau after Lange's death in 1853.

On 19 January 1858, another fire destroyed the wing parallel to the Oder river. The fire, noticed around 1:00 PM in the brewery, quickly spread to other buildings covered with shingles. The destroyed southern wing was dismantled. A new brewery building was erected in place of the northern and partially western wings. On 10 June 1858, the cornerstone was laid for the new building. The layout of the rooms in the western part was changed, and the economic building became a malt house. The northwest part was enriched with a carriage house. The chapel regained its Gothic facade and was enriched with, among other things, a painting depicting St. Thomas Becket. The entire reconstruction was overseen by Julius Starcke and master carpenter Robert Raschdorf. On 8 October 1859, the brewery was put into operation.

In 1871, during the Prussian administrative reform, the manorial area (German: Gutsbezirke) of Ostróg was created, which also included the castle. In 1893, at the age of 46, after the death of Prince Victor, his son Viktor Amadeus II von Hohenlohe-Schillingsfürst became the owner of the castle.

=== 20th century ===
In 1902, the name of the manorial area of Ostróg was changed to the manorial area of Racibórz-Castle. On 5 January 1927, the manorial area of Racibórz-Castle was incorporated into Racibórz and ceased to function as an independent administrative division. In 1923, after the death of Prince Viktor II, the owner of the castle became Victor August Maria III. The successor to Prince Victor III was killed in 1939 during the September Campaign in the Battle of Modlin. Victor III died on 11 November 1945, and his successor was Franz-Albrecht Metternich-Sándor, who, however, did not inherit the Racibórz Castle as it became the property of the Polish state.

Until 1945, the castle housed princely officials. During World War II, the castle buildings did not suffer any damage. Since 1945, the castle has been owned by the State Treasury under the administration of the Racibórz County. Initially, after the war, an archive was located here, apartments were situated in part of the princely palace, and beer production was resumed in the brewery. From the 1950s onwards, there was a gradual degradation of the buildings. The residential building in the southeast part was demolished because it was damaged in a fire. The altar, organ, and benches in the chapel were devastated and destroyed. In the collection of the Racibórz Museum, there is a painting of St. Thomas Becket by Jan Bochenek and statues of the Apostles, which originally were in the sedilia. In the following years, the carriage house building and cloisters were demolished, and the rooms of the castle house suffered further damage. In the 1960s, archaeological research was conducted, confirming the existence of wooden structures from the 12th century on the castle site. Since the 1990s, the castle has been gradually restored, including micro-piling to prevent the settlement of the structure.

=== 21st century ===
Since 2001, outdoor events, mainly concerts and knight tournaments, have been held in the castle courtyard from April to October. On 17 June 2008, a major renovation of the castle began, estimated at 23,600,000 PLN. Nearly 20 million PLN in funding for this purpose was obtained through the support of the European Union. In 2009, funding was obtained from the Silesian Voivodeship to establish the Moravian Gate Cultural Heritage Center at the castle. In the spring of 2009, the renovation team discovered a tunnel beneath the gate building leading towards Zamkowa Street. This tunnel was likely part of a canal system that drained water or sewage from the castle buildings. The entrance to the canal was hidden in the floor of one of the gate building rooms. The tunnel descended about five meters before a bend and a bricked-up wall with a gap, behind which lay a pile of brick rubble. A trial pit was dug in front of the gate building, but after reaching a depth of 4.7 meters, no tunnel vault was found. Therefore, the county office, as the owner of the castle, received 300,000 PLN from the Silesian Voivodeship Marshal to clear the corridor of debris and prepare it for tourist visits. The tunnel clearance was carried out by miners from the Central Mining Rescue Station in Bytom. During the work, a second tunnel was discovered, leading south from under the gate building. After removing the gate building's plaster, it was found to be in worse condition than expected, requiring "strengthening of the walls and stitching" as well as a new roof. During the cleaning of the so-called princely palace, a Gothic floor with a small masonry opening for collecting water was discovered in one of the cellars.

== Architecture ==
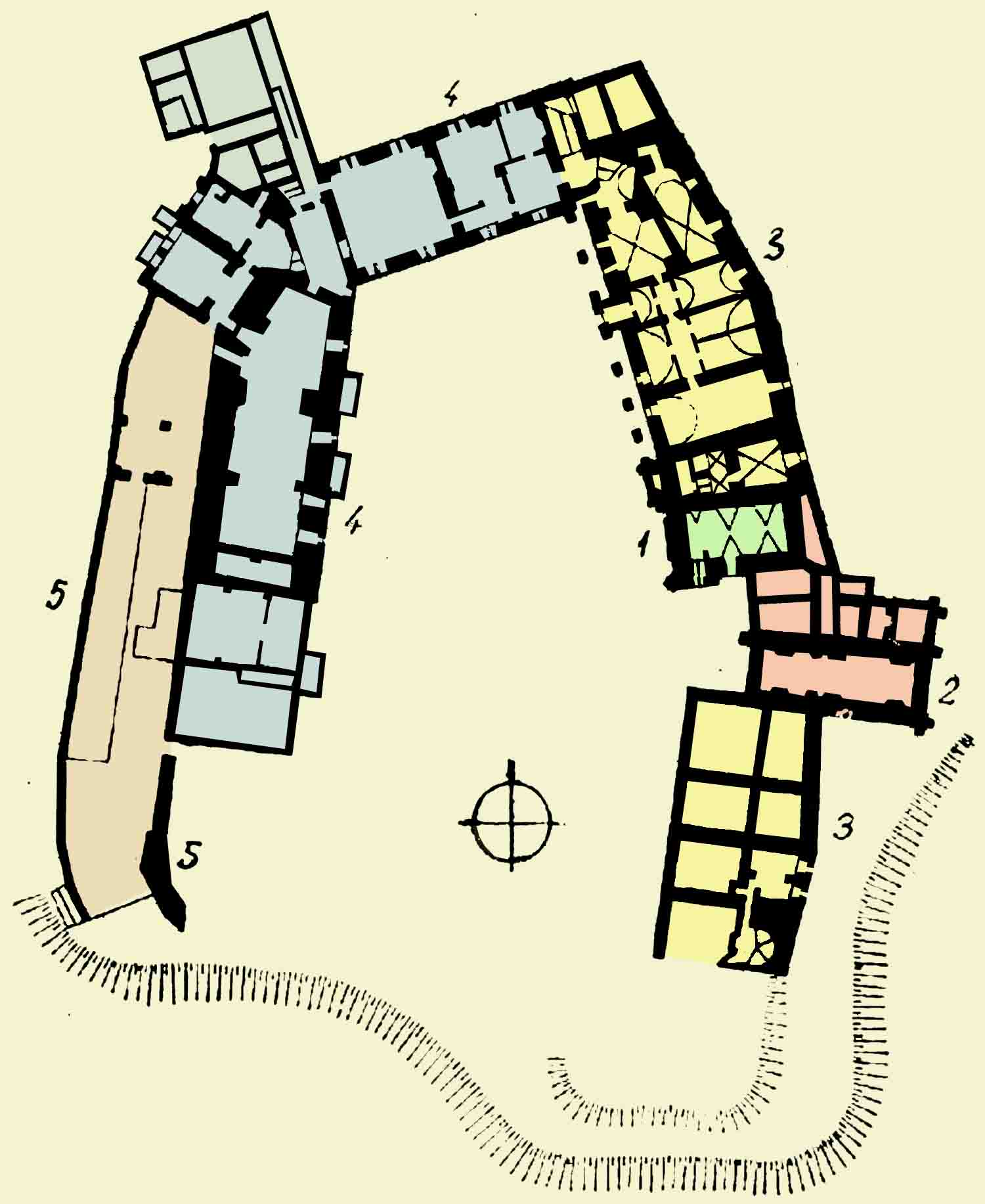
Basement and wall plan (1:1500) – 1. chapel, 2. gate building, 3. residential buildings of the east wing, 4. northern and western utility wings, 5. defensive walls

The castle features both Gothic and Renaissance elements, with stylistic features that have largely been erased. All buildings are made of brick and are plastered.

The castle was built on the site of an ancient stronghold located on a natural island surrounded by wooden-earth ramparts, a mill channel, and the main stream of the Oder river and its tributary. The only access to the fortress was via a causeway crossing the marshy terrain, with entry facilitated by a drawbridge. The stronghold consisted of wooden houses constructed with horizontal log beams stacked on top of each other, forming so-called log cabins, interconnected with connectors. Inside the houses, there were floors. The buildings were likely consumed by fire, as evidenced by traces of scorch marks and some charred elements found during archaeological excavations. The fortress probably had one stone building, which was the chapel. Inside were rooms for the castellan, his crew, and servants, as well as necessary agricultural buildings for the functioning of the stronghold. The main function of the structure was primarily defensive. Archaeological research confirmed the existence of seven cultural layers, ranging from the present buildings to traces of the ancient stronghold. The unmined layer of rock is located 5 meters below the courtyard. According to the conducted research, the establishment of the stronghold can be dated back to the 9th century at the earliest.

In 1281, the independent Duchy of Racibórz was established, prompting Przemysław of Racibórz to begin the reconstruction of the stronghold. As a result of the reconstruction completed in 1287, a compact complex of brick buildings was created, with the main accent being the residential building resembling a palace. Initially, the rampart surrounding the stronghold had a timber-frame structure, which in the first half of the 13th century was reinforced with earth masses and used as a foundation for the construction of a brick wall. The construction of the lower part of the walls utilized the Wendish brickwork, while the upper part utilized the Polish brickwork (Gothic). The second part of the defensive walls was built no earlier than the 15th century. Today, only the walls in the western and northeastern parts of the castle have survived, along with the foundations of the walls in the southeastern corner. Unfortunately, no tower or turret has survived to this day. The courtyard buildings date back to the 13th century and indicate the use of solutions employed by the Czechs. The fact that the reconstruction of the defensive system was based on the old wooden-earth rampart suggests that the castle began to serve a residential-representative function rather than a defensive one as before.

=== Eastern wing ===
This section covers the main castle buildings, which are heterogeneous in terms of function and period of construction. To the north stands a residential building, which rests on the ancient walls of the Gothic castle, as well as a chapel, a gatehouse, and the ruins of a residential building in the southeast.

==== Residential building, known as the princely palace ====
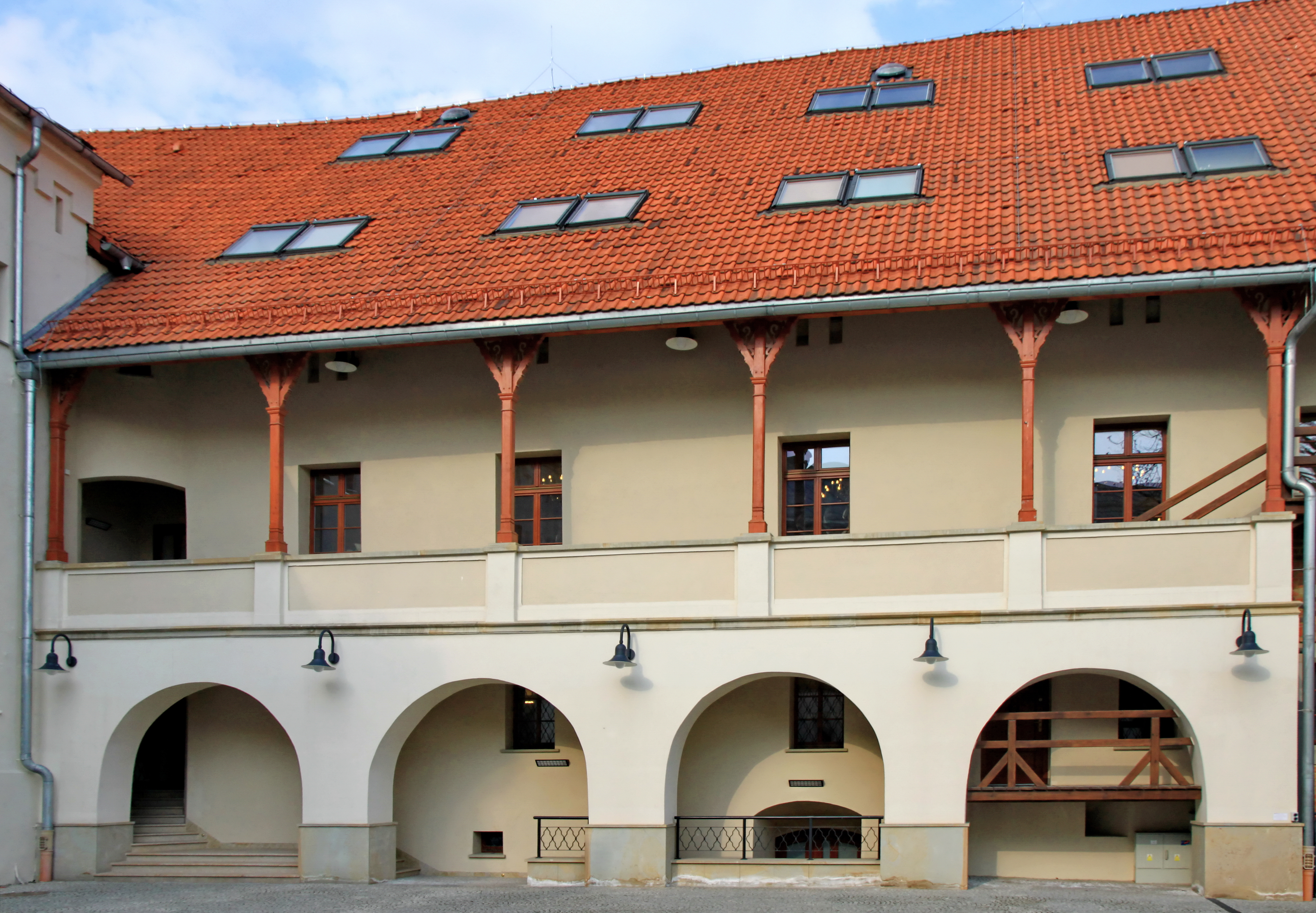
Residential building after renovations

The grand masonry house, known as the princely palace, is attached to the eastern part of the walls and the northern wall of the chapel. Archaeological research confirms the existence of buildings dating back to the 12th/13th century in this location. In the 15th/16th century, the building was thoroughly rebuilt and expanded to the northern frontage of the courtyard. It neighbored the brewery building, located behind the castle walls. The building underwent reconstruction in the first half of the 17th century and after 1858, following a fire at the castle. The residential building is two-story, cellar-equipped, and erected on an elongated rectangular plan, with a slightly broken eastern side. The interior layout features one bay and has been significantly altered. The ground floor predominantly features barrel vaults and barrel-groin vaults with lowered arches. In the southern part, there is a winding staircase, also vaulted. The rooms on the upper floor are covered with ceilings. On the courtyard side, a masonry cloister with columned arcades, semi-circularly closed, is visible at the ground level. The cloister is partially vaulted. On the upper floor, there are protruding roof eaves supported by neo-Gothic wooden columns. The windows in the building have an irregular layout. The gable roof is covered with eternit, with newer dormers.

On the half-floor, right next to the northern wall of the castle chapel, one of the oldest graffiti in Poland is found. There are 17th-century inscriptions on the wall, probably made during the Thirty Years' War, left by soldiers stationed at the castle at that time. Also on the wall is the date of the year 1888. It is presumed that this room may have served as a prison, as legal proceedings took place in the adjacent hall.

==== Chapel of St. Thomas Becket ====
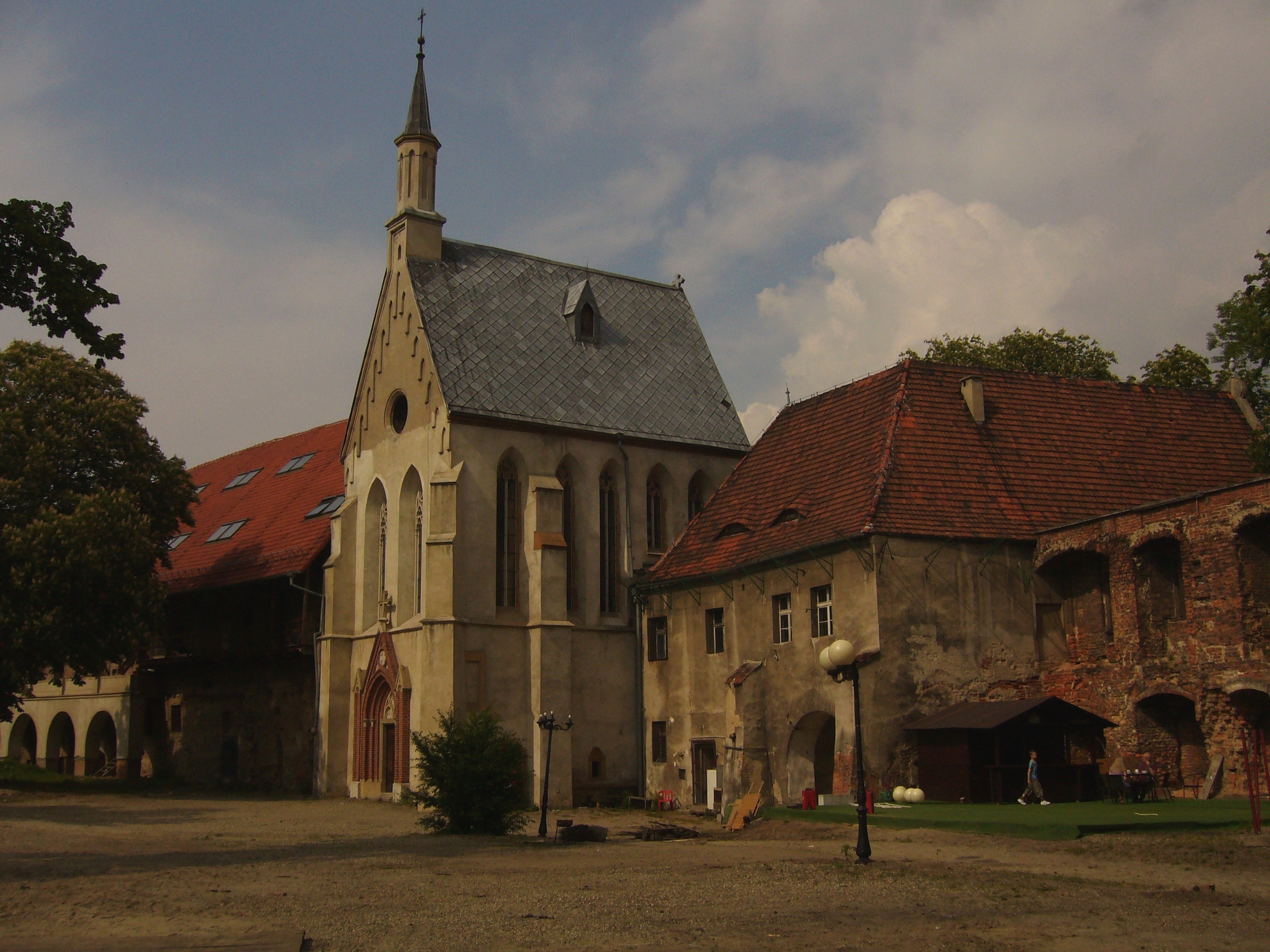
View of the gatehouse and castle chapel

The chapel was built between 1288 and 1293 as a result of the construction of the new masonry castle. Since the mid-19th century, the castle chapel has been called the pearl of Silesian Gothic due to its high level of artistic quality. The building is also known as the Silesian Sainte-Chapelle.

The temple, along with the castle residence, was added to the first section of walls from the east. It is located in the eastern wing of the castle, between the gatehouse and the main castle buildings. The chapel stands on the foundations of the previous temple. Initially, it was freestanding. It is built on a rectangular plan measuring 8.5 by 13 meters, is oriented, made of brick in a Wendish brickwork, plastered, and adorned with dimension stone details. The chapel was the first freestanding sacred building on Silesian lands, planted on a rectangular plan.

==== Gatehouse ====
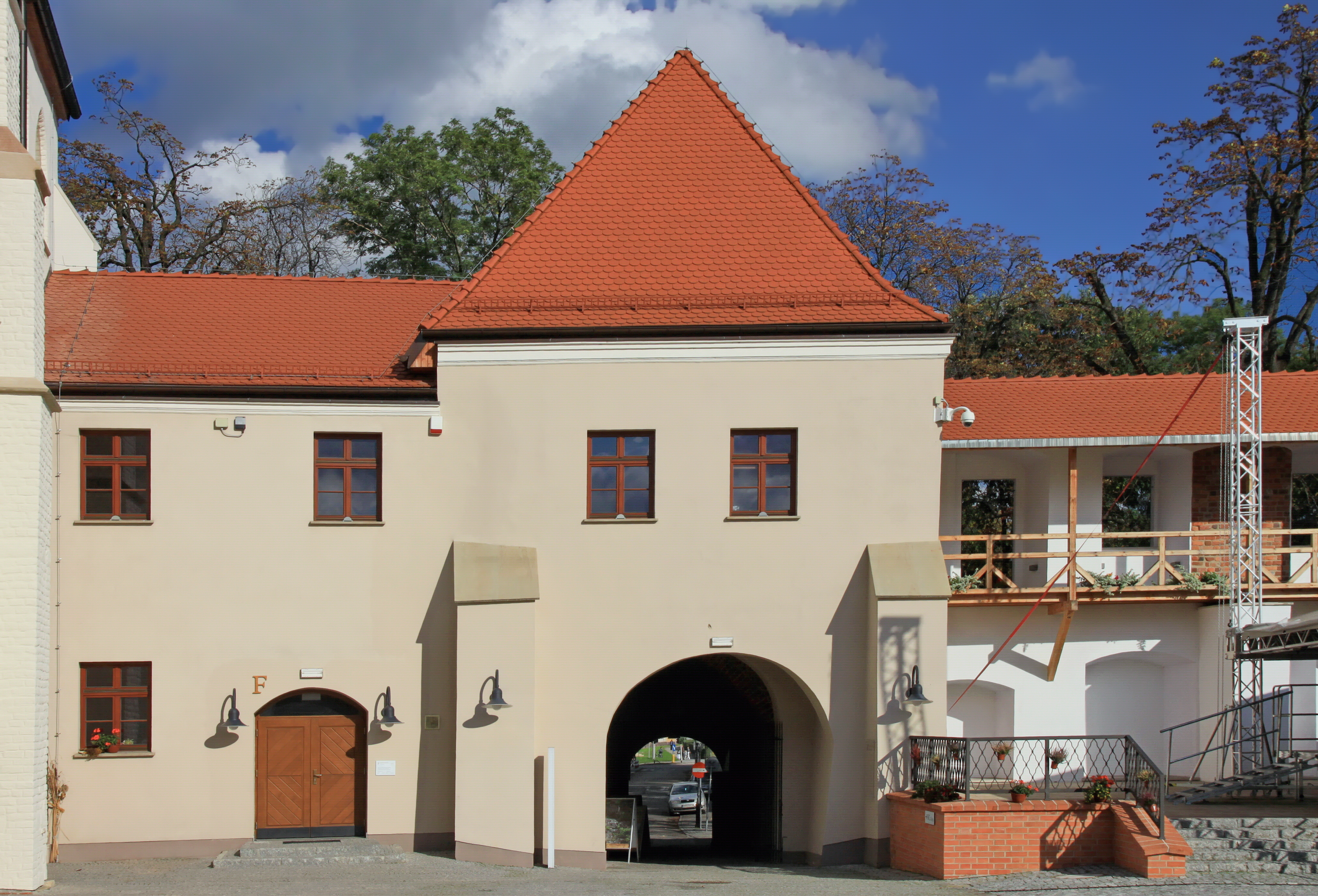
Gatehouse after renovations

Initially, the building was half the current length and was located in the first section of walls. It was likely built in the 13th century and rebuilt in the 13th/14th century. In the 14th/15th century, the building collapsed and was subsequently reconstructed. The building is set back from the courtyard, leaning considerably to the east. It dates from the first half of the 17th century, built on the foundation of a 14th-century structure, and reconstructed around 1950. The structure is two stories high and rectangular in plan. In the southern part, there is a passage with barrel vaults and lunettes on the arches. Additionally, there is a pointed arch arcade from the former Gothic gate. The northern part consists of several small rooms covered with ceilings. The rooms on the upper floor are also covered with ceilings. There are buttresses on the eastern corners and in the middle of the eastern and western external elevations. The eastern part of the elevation is crowned with two reconstructed gables, destroyed in 1945. The entrance to the castle is semicircular, with a nineteenth-century two-leaf plank gate. There are windows on the ground floor, with a seventeenth-century grille in the west. In the passage to the castle, there is a protruding stone corbel, probably from the Middle Ages. The building has a gable roof covered with tiles, with a transverse hip roof in the western part.

==== Southeastern building ====
The building, added between 1603 and 1636, partially utilizes Gothic walls. Currently, only ruins of the structure remain, which was originally two stories high, built on a plan similar to a rectangle, with a slightly indented eastern side. The interiors had a two-bay layout. The southern part of the building shows traces of a barrel vault and a spiral staircase. The walls exhibit numerous alterations and preserved Gothic elements. The exterior elevation features a new cornice, beneath which there was once a seventeenth-century lunette cornice, now removed. In the wall, which is the only remnant of the former building, there are several stone window frames, and on the upper floor, one can see rectangular and profiled frames of the passage to the gatehouse. In the northwest corner, there is an embedded, sculpted, Gothic cantilever in the shape of a head, dating from the 13th/14th century.

=== Northwestern wing ===
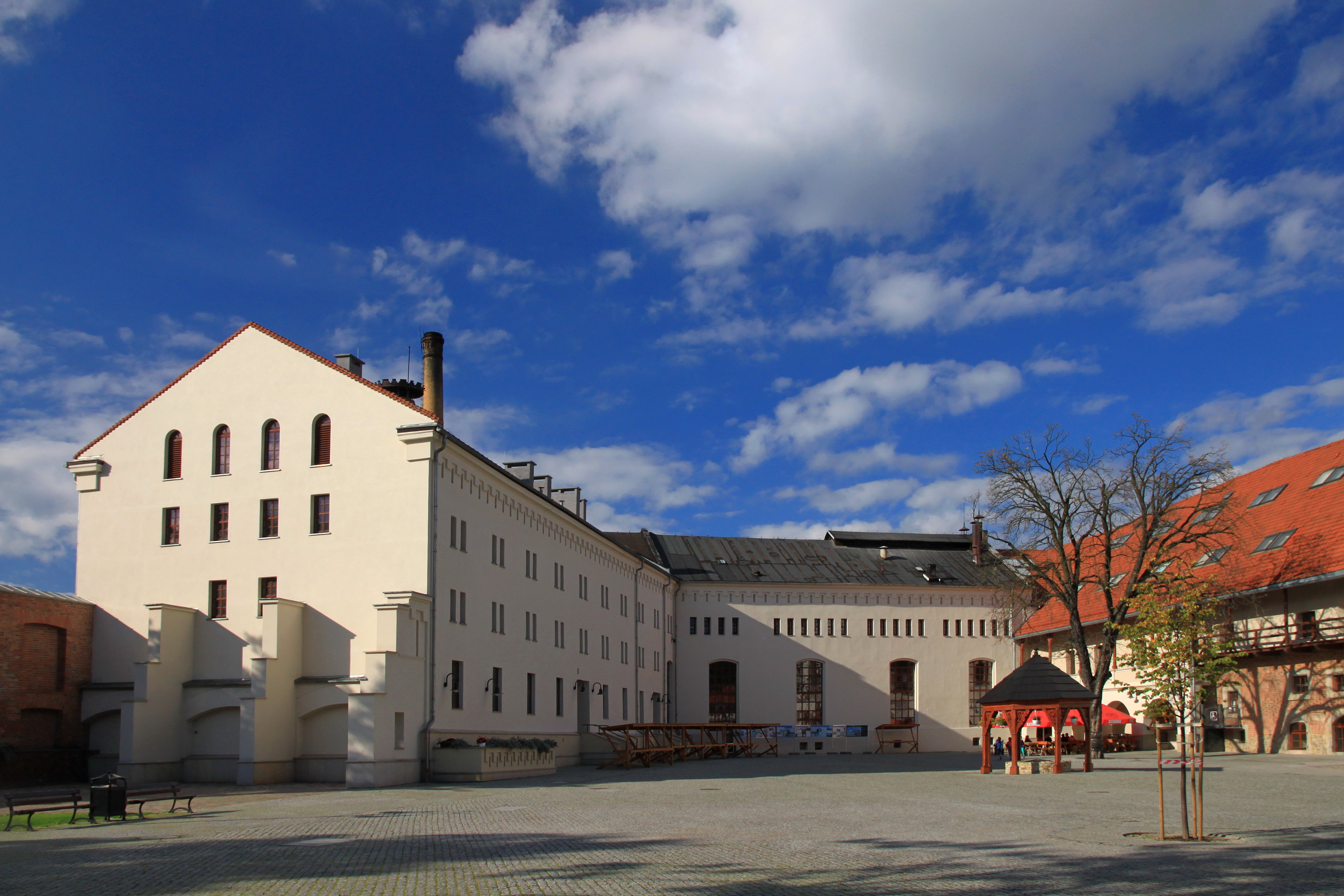
Northwestern wing of the castle from the side of the courtyard, after renovation

The wing used for economic purposes houses the headquarters of Castle Brewing Company. After the fire in 1858, it was rebuilt as a brewery, completely devoid of historical features. The building of the malt house and carriage house in the western part was probably erected in the 16th century. The ground floor of the western wing retains thick walls likely dating back to the first half of the 17th century. Additionally, in the extension of the western wing towards the south, there are preserved fragments of a double brick wall with different patterns: the inner circuit from the first half of the 17th century and the outer circuit Gothic, probably from the 15th century. The inner wall is taller.

== Castle brewery ==
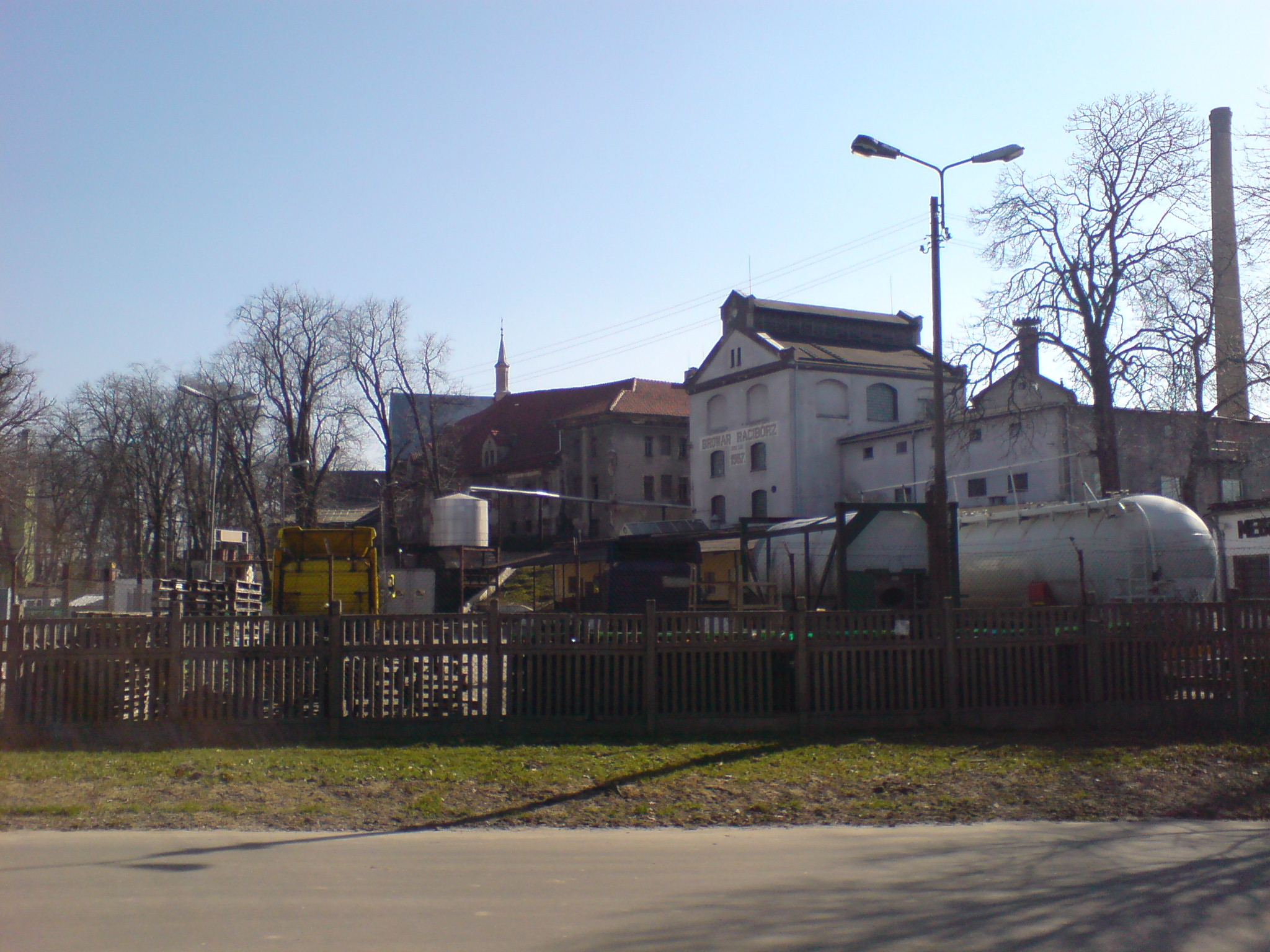
Northwestern wing, currently Castle Brewing Company

The first mention of a brewery existing in the castle dates back to 1532, with another in 1567. In 1559, a castle tavern was also mentioned. However, the true development of the Racibórz brewery occurred during the reign of the Hohenlohe-Schillingsfürst family. At that time, Racibórz beer was consumed in canteens at Silesian factories and even in taverns in the Hlučín region.

On 19 January 1858, a fire broke out in the castle, which also consumed the brewery. The Racibórz duke decided to finance the construction of a new brewery. The previous building was demolished, and trees were planted in its place. The new building forms the northern wing of the castle to this day. The brewery was equipped with a steam engine, making it unmatched by the nine other municipal breweries.

From 1896 to 1897, a complete modernization of the brewery took place, resulting in a modern brewhouse, machine room, boiler room, cooling room, malt drying room, lager cellar, beer storage, and quarters for brewery apprentices. In 1898, the facility employed 55 people, led by brewmaster Kaufmann. In 1899, the Racibórz brewery was already producing Pilsner beer. The beer was served in the Racibórz, Głubczyce, Koźle, Rybnik, and Hlučín regions. In Gliwice, there was a warehouse for Racibórz brew. The beer was present in factory canteens, at the stations in Racibórz and Kędzierzyn, in the princely inn in Sławięcice, as well as in Wrocław in a restaurant on Nowoświdnicka Street.

The quality of Racibórz beer was influenced by several factors: careful cultivation, harvesting, and cleaning of barley on the duke's estates. High-quality water was piped to the brewery from Obora using wooden pipes. Archaeological research conducted at the beginning of Bosadzka Street confirms the existence of hollowed-out wooden logs, which archaeologists believe to be part of a water supply system from Obora. Fragments of these pipes are now available to visitors at the museum. Hops were imported from Hallertau in Bavaria or the Czech Sudetes. Additionally, until 1945, the beer was stored in wooden barrels, although metal ones were used in other breweries. The primary and secondary fermentation process took place in the lager cellar in special vats, then in lager barrels made of oak. The secondary fermentation lasted for three months, which was not practiced in other Upper Silesian breweries. Before being refilled, each barrel was tarred and cleaned.

During World War I and afterward, the Racibórz brewery faced a crisis. Many markets were lost, and there were numerous difficulties with importing the raw materials needed to produce beer. However, the greatest loss was the death of brewmaster Kaufmann, who took his secret recipe to the grave. In the 1930s, new and large brewing companies emerged, offering much cheaper but also lower-quality goods. This fact led to the disappearance of the Racibórz brand from the market.

In 2004, after renovation and the installation of brewing equipment from Tymbark, the brewery resumed operations. In 2009, it was announced that the brewery will be liquidated. Production resumed in 2010. Beer is still brewed at the Racibórz brewery as it was centuries ago, in open vats.

== Mysteries and legends associated with the castle ==
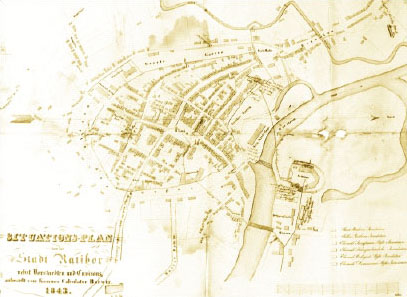
Schneider's map with a hand-drawn underground passage under the Oder river

The tunnel is one of the mysteries associated with the castle, which was supposed to lead from the Dominican monastery to the castle. The secret passage was said to have been built at the end of the 13th century, during the reign of Przemysław of Racibórz, when his daughter Euphemia joined the Dominican convent. The tunnel was supposed to enable meetings between father and daughter, and also, in case of danger, provide the nuns with an escape route to the castle. In 1988, the city authorities, along with the Catholic Church, reached an agreement regarding the renovation of the castle chapel. During the renovation works, a map dating back to 1843 was found in the turret on the spire of the chapel. It depicted the state of the city's buildings from 1843 and 1858 due to handwritten annotations.

The map became a historical discovery because of the annotations made by Robert Schneider, who likely supervised the reconstruction of the castle after the fire. He marked on the map an underground tunnel that started at the site of the old castle tower and ended at the Dominican monastery. It was probably the legendary passage under the Odra river described by Hyckel. In 2001, archaeological research was conducted at the site of the former tower in the southeastern corner, which led to the discovery of an entrance to an underground corridor. The corridor led to the basement of the tower, where an entrance leading towards the Odra river was found. This was probably where the legendary tunnel began. This passage was likely destroyed in the 19th century during the Odra river flood, which caused the walls to collapse.

One of the legends is described by Augustyn Weltzel:

On the grounds of the northern and western wings, a steam brewery was erected. In the middle of the courtyard stands a well. A longitudinal, massive entrance gate has been preserved, adorned with the princely coat of arms. Behind it, to the left, on the protruding, sharp corner of the house, there is a bricked-up stone head, whose eyes are directed towards the well or slightly higher. Although it does not resemble a Tatar face, it is nevertheless considered to be the head of that Mongolian prince who was defeated here in the 13th century. Associated with this strange figure is the legend that precisely in this place, to which the stone eyes are directed, there is a great treasure. The late director general Gustaw Adolf von Wiese, who died on March 29, 1880, amused by the curiosity of foreigners who were closely examining this architectural curiosity, jokingly confirmed the truth by saying: the legend is true, this head is looking at the real treasure, by which he meant the brewery located opposite.

== Bibliography ==
- Newerla, Paweł (2008). Dzieje Raciborza i jego dzielnic (in Polish). Racibórz: Wydawnictwo i Agencja Informacyjna WAW. ISBN 978-83-89802-73-6.
- Chrzanowski, Tadeusz; Kornecki, Marian (1967). Katalog zabytków sztuki w Polsce. Województwo opolskie. Powiat raciborski (in Polish). Vol. VII. Warsaw: Instytut Sztuki Polskiej Akademii Nauk.
- Wawoczny, Grzegorz (2003). Weekend w Bramie Morawskiej (in Polish). Racibórz: Wydawnictwo i Agencja Informacyjna WAW. ISBN 83-917453-4-1.
- Wawoczny, Grzegorz (2007). Zabytki powiatu raciborskiego (PDF) (in Polish). Racibórz: Wydawnictwo i Agencja Informacyjna WAW. ISBN 978-83-89802-36-1. Archived from the original (PDF) on 2013-09-27.
- Wawoczny, Grzegorz (2002). Zamek w Raciborzu (PDF) (in Polish). Racibórz: Wydawnictwo i Agencja Informacyjna WAW. ISBN 83-912030-8-5. Archived from the original (PDF) on 2011-05-30.
- Wawoczny, Grzegorz; Newerla, Paweł (2007). Zamki i pałace dorzecza Górnej Odry (in Polish). Racibórz: Wydawnictwo i Agencja Informacyjna WAW. ISBN 978-83-89802-24-8.
- Emmerling, Danuta and Ryszard (2000). Śląskie zamki i pałace: Opolszczyzna (in Polish). Opole: ADAN. ISBN 83-908136-4-5.
- Kantyka, Jan, ed. (1981). Racibórz: Zarys rozwoju miasta (in Polish). Katowice: Śląsk. ISBN 83-216-0140-5.
- Mika, Norbert (2010). Dzieje Ziemi Raciborskiej (in Polish). Kraków: Avalon. ISBN 978-83-7730-003-9.
