= Wileńska Street, Racibórz =

Street in Racibórz, Poland

Wileńska Street
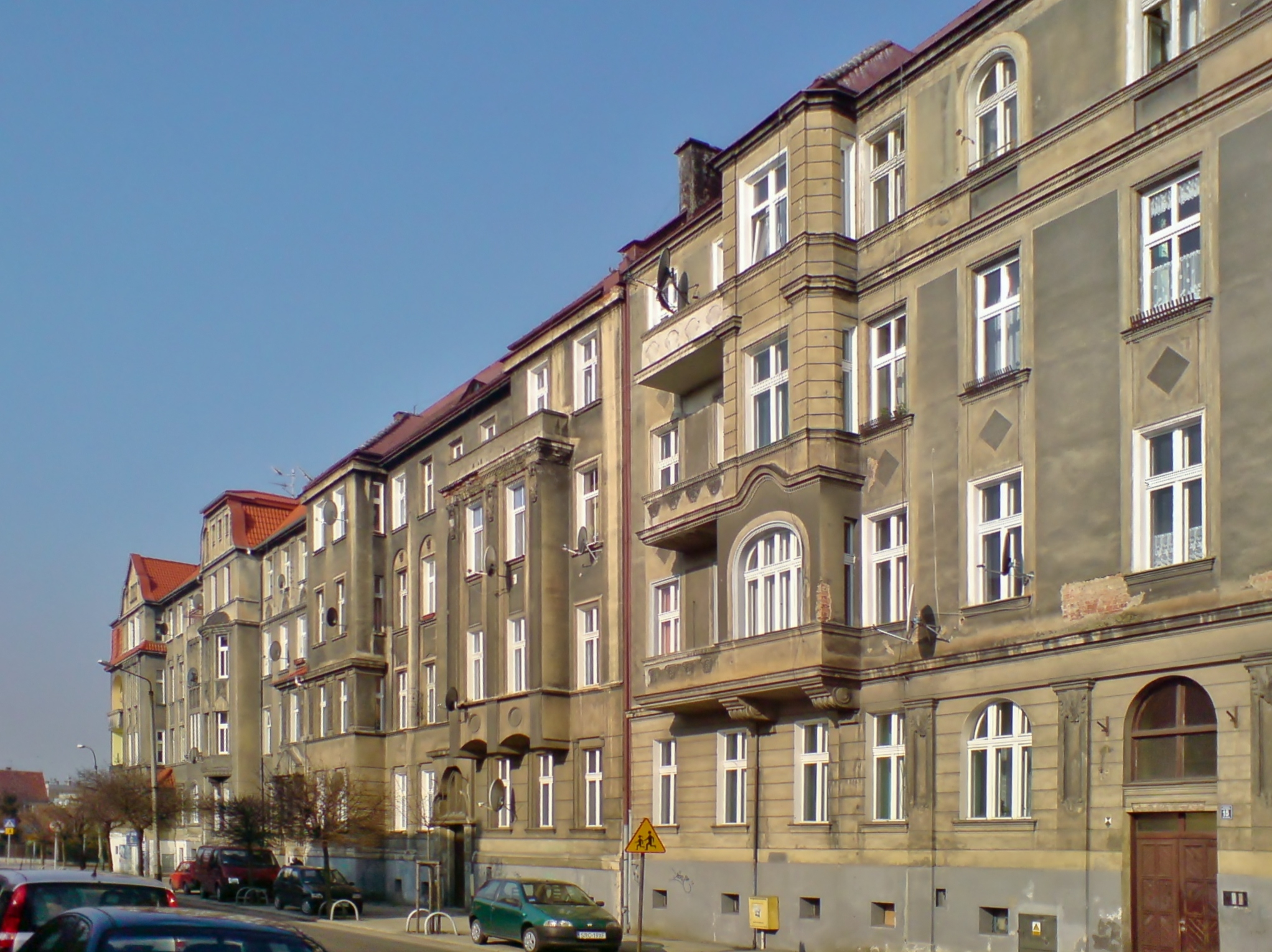
- Tenements near Wileńska Street

- Location within Silesian Voivodeship Location within Poland
- Part of: Nowe Zagrody
- Length: 415 m (1,362 ft)
- Location: Racibórz
- Coordinates: 50.088943°N 18.215263°E

Wileńska Street (formerly known as Hohenzollernstraße, later Roosevelt Street and Fornalska Street) is a street in Racibórz, located in the Nowe Zagrody district, with a length of 415 meters. It was established in 1903. The street starts at the intersection with Browarna and Wojska Polskiego streets and ends at the intersection with Lwowska and Warszawska streets. Along the street, there are several eclectic tenements, residential blocks, the Orlik 2012 sports complex, the administrative building of the Nowoczesna Housing Cooperative, the Craftsmen's Guild, the Civil Registry Office, the School of Construction and Crafts, the Vocational School, the State Music School, and a building of the State University of Applied Sciences, referred to as Słoneczko (The Little Sun). In the past, there was also an Evangelical church located on this street.

== History ==
The street was laid out in 1903, likely influenced by the evangelical parish, which planned to build its church on the adjacent land. This church, along with the vicarage and parish house, was constructed between 1909 and 1911. The new street was named Hohenzollernstraße, after the reigning imperial Hohenzollern dynasty at the time. In 1934, the building of the current School of Construction and Crafts was completed. Earlier, in 1900, the building of the Vocational School was erected. The tenements along the street date back to the late 19th and early 20th centuries. In the 1930s, the building now used by the State University of Applied Sciences, popularly known as Słoneczko (The Little Sun), was also constructed.

On a 1924 city map, the street extended to Bukowa Street, further than today, leading to the so-called Keil Baths. Currently, the section from Lwowska Street to Bukowa Street is part of Warszawska Street. After World War II, the street was named after Franklin Delano Roosevelt, but the name was soon changed to Fornalska Street (after Małgorzata Fornalska). The street was often mistakenly called Fornalska during that period.

During the Polish People's Republic era, the evangelical church was demolished, and several residential blocks were built. Between 1973 and 1978, the building for the State Music School was constructed, partially on the site of the old church. In 1992, as part of the wave of name changes following the political transformation, the street was renamed Wileńska (after the city of Vilnius). In 2002, the intersection with Ogrodowa Street was redesigned into a small roundabout due to frequent collisions and accidents. In 2010, a sports complex was opened as part of the Orlik 2012 project.

=== Former evangelical church ===
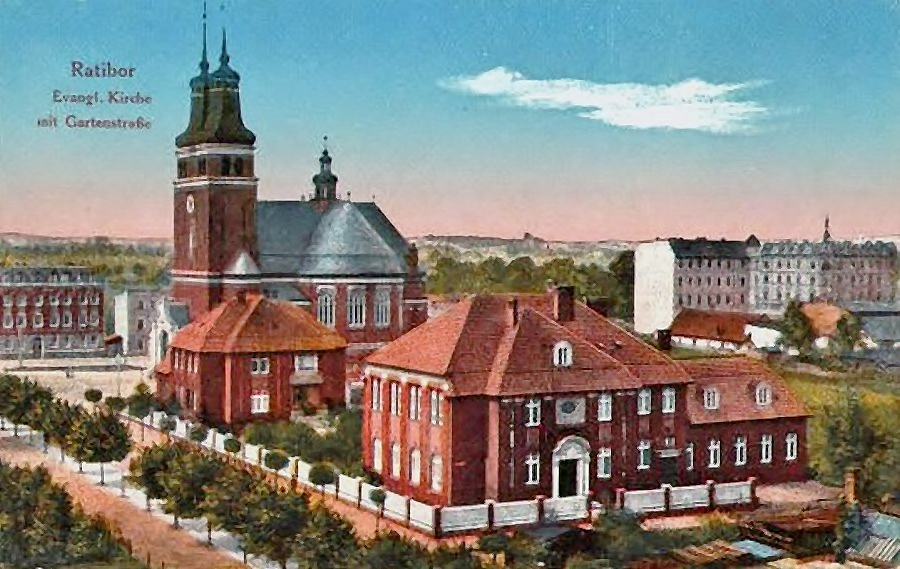
Church on an old postcard from the early 20th century. The lower part also shows the rectory building and the parish house

At the corner of Wileńska and Ogrodowa streets, where the State Music School is now located, there once stood an evangelical church. It was a Lutheran church of the Augsburg Confession, built between 1909 and 1911 based on a design by architect Jürgen Kröger. During World War II, the church sustained little damage, but it gradually deteriorated after the war and was demolished in the 1960s. Today, only the vicarage building, housing the Civil Registry Office, and the parish house, home to the Craftsmen's Guild and other institutions, remain.

In the interwar years, the church was one of the city's landmarks. It had two baroque towers with copper-covered domes at the front. The oval central part was covered by a dome supported by four columns. The church walls were made of red clinker brick. It measured 44.5 meters in length, 30 meters in width, and the towers reached 51 meters, including the crosses. The dome rose to a height of 17 meters. The entrance, accessible through a sandstone portal, faced Wileńska Street. Inside, the walls were plastered in gray and adorned with gilding. The portal led to a spacious church porch, above which was a choir. In the chancel, there was an altar transferred from the Holy Spirit Church, previously the place of worship for the evangelicals, but equipped with a new painting by Professor Eduard Kaempffer. The stained glass windows depicted scenes from the New Testament.

== Course ==
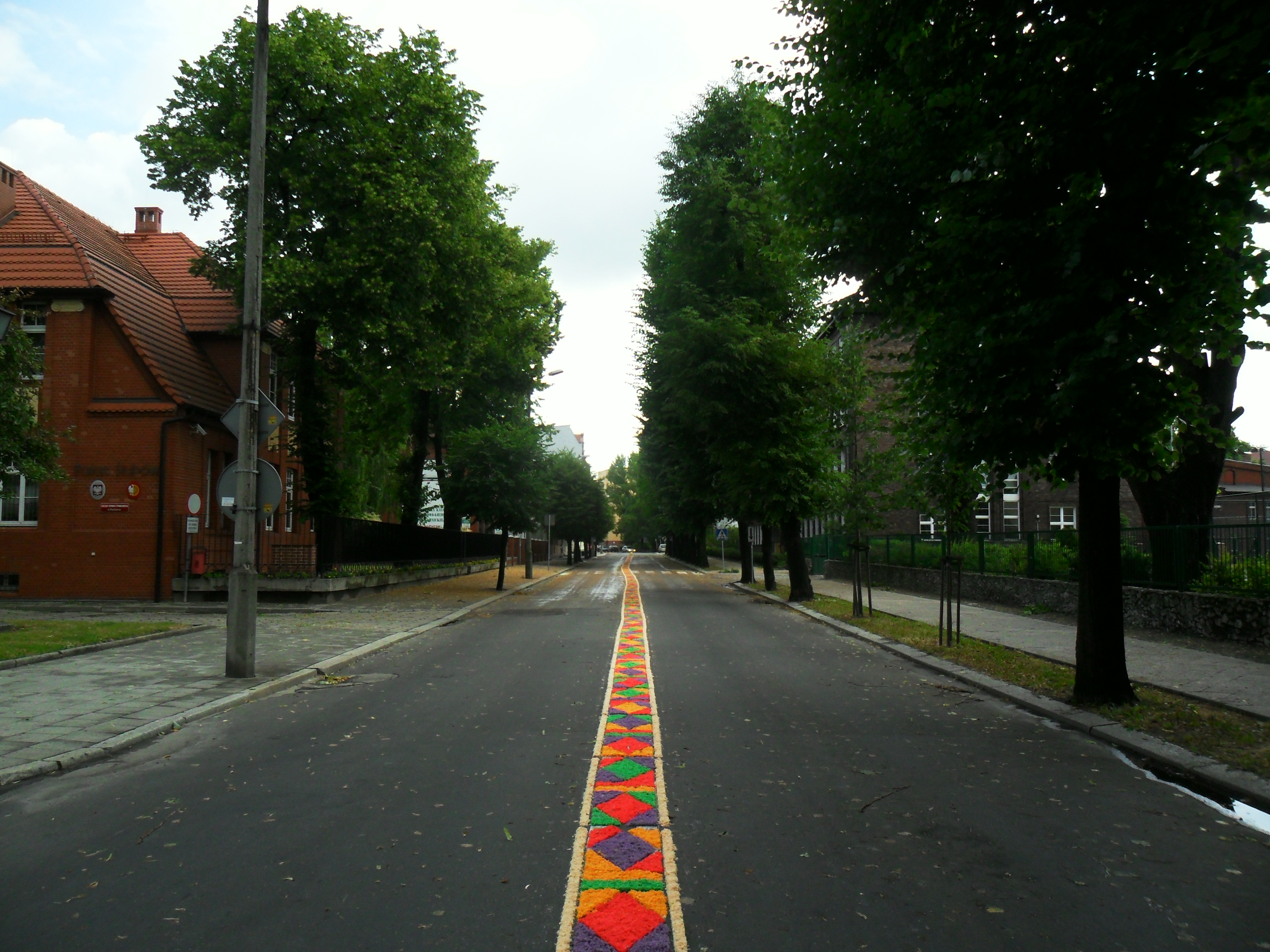
Wileńska Street – in the photo, a traditional flower carpet laid out for the Feast of Corpus Christi

Wileńska Street begins at the intersection of Browarna and Wojska Polskiego streets. On the western side, at 15 Wojska Polskiego Street, on the corner of the intersection, there is a tenement with the Centrum pharmacy on the ground floor. On the opposite side is a residential block. Moving along, on the eastern side, stands the building of the School of Construction and Crafts. Opposite it is the administrative building of the Nowoczesna Housing Cooperative. Next to it is the former evangelical parish house, now used by the Craftsmen's Guild and other institutions. In front of the house, running perpendicular to Wileńska Street, is the short Kiliński Street. Behind the parish house stands the former vicarage, now home to the civil registry office. Further down, at the corner of Wileńska and Ogrodowa streets, there once stood an evangelical church, replaced in the 1970s by the State Music School. Opposite is the Vocational School building. Between the Vocational School and the School of Construction and Crafts is a sports complex built under the Orlik 2012 project. After the roundabout with Ogrodowa Street, three residential blocks are situated on the eastern side, oriented perpendicularly to the street's course, and one block is located along its length on the opposite side, adjacent to a row of tenements stretching to the intersection with Lwowska and Warszawska streets. At this intersection, opposite the tenement, is the building currently used by the State University of Applied Sciences in Racibórz, popularly called Słoneczko.

The street is lit with lamps located on one (north-western) side. The asphalt road has a width of between 7.4 and 8 meters, with 2 meters allocated to a bike path created after renovations in 2013. Trees line both sides of the street, and sidewalks made of pavement slabs are also present on both sides. The intersections and roundabout are devoid of traffic lights. There are six pedestrian crossings: at the intersection with Lwowska and Warszawska streets, two at the roundabout with Ogrodowa Street, in front of the southern entrance to the School of Construction and Crafts, between the northern entrance to the school grounds and the intersection with Kiliński Street, and the last one at the intersection with Wojska Polskiego and Browarna streets.

== Architecture ==
Wileńska Street features five residential blocks, four school buildings, the Nowoczesna Housing Cooperative administrative building, the former presbytery, the evangelical parish house, and tenements: at the corner with Wojska Polskiego Street, there is an eclectic tenement with Baroque Revival elements built between 1880 and 1900. There is also a row of eclectic tenements with Art Nouveau elements at 13–21 Wileńska Street, constructed by Georg Lüthge's company between 1906 and 1910, based on designs by architect Bruno Wolter.

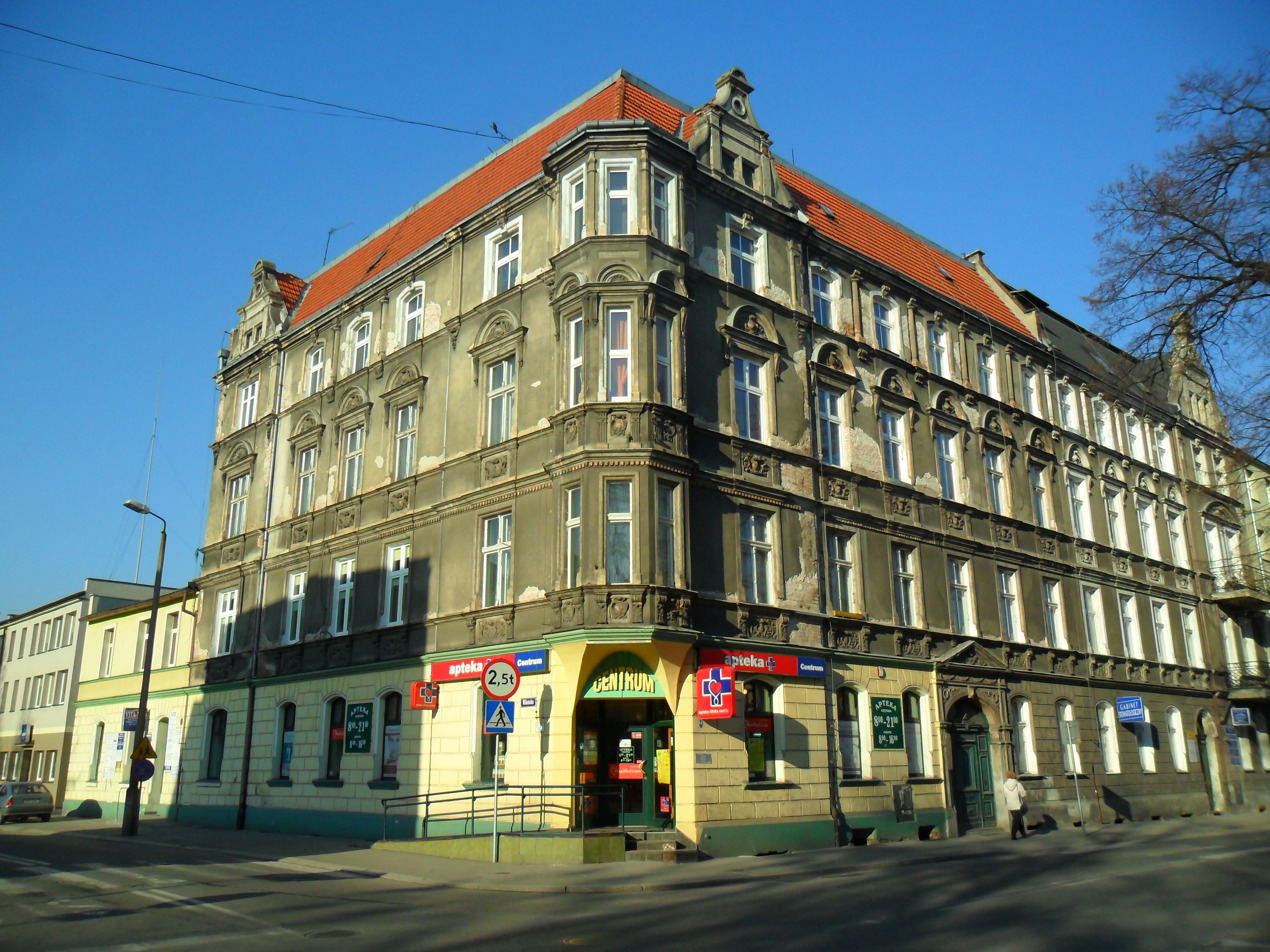
Tenement at 15 Wojska Polskiego Street (corner of Wileńska Street) Building at 6 Wileńska Street (School of Construction and Crafts) Former presbytery at 7 Wileńska Street (currently civil registry office) Building at 8 Wileńska Street (Vocational School Complex) Former parish house at 2 Kiliński Street

- Tenement at 15 Wojska Polskiego Street (corner of Wileńska Street) – a four-story eclectic building with Baroque Revival elements. The architectural details have been preserved. The ground floor is bossaged, and the upper stories are plastered. The corner features a three-story bay window. The window pediments are semicircular and segmented. The window sills and gable decorations feature geometric and floral motifs. The façade is richly adorned with decorations of geometric, floral, shell, and pilaster motifs. The entrance portal is decorated with pilasters, a triangular pediment, and laurel wreaths, ribbons, garlands, and a cartouche. A two-story annex is located on the Wileńska Street side.
- Building at 6 Wileńska Street – built in a modernist style and gradually opened in 1932 and 1934. It is a four-story building in line with the street. The multi-axial front features a visible flat avant-corps. The façade is clad with red clinker bricks. It houses the School of Construction and Crafts. Next to it is a gymnasium building from 1894 with no distinctive stylistic features.
- Former presbytery at 7 Wileńska Street – built between 1909 and 1911, designed by Jürgen Kröger in a semi-modernist style. It is a freestanding, two-story building on a rectangular plan, made of red brick with plastered decorative elements. The front façade features a decorative portal, semicircularly closed, flanked by Ionic columns with capitals. Above the portal is an oculus. In front of the building stands Racibórz's only remaining old gas lantern (now converted to electric). The side façade features an avant-corps, and the building is topped with a mansard roof.
- Building at 8 Wileńska Street – built in 1908 in a neo-Gothic style. It is a four-story, rectangular brick building with simple architectural details. Decorative elements are made of glazed brick. The façades feature avant-corps. The front façade includes a double, rectangular avant-corps topped with a triangular gable adorned with stepped ornaments and three crenellations.
- Former parish house at 2 Kiliński Street – built after 1911 in a semi-modernist style. A freestanding, two-story building made of red brick with plastered decorative elements. The front façade features a rectangular avant-corps, while the rear façade has two visible avant-corps.
- Tenement at 13 Wileńska Street – built between 1906 and 1910 in an eclectic style with Art Nouveau elements. The four-story building is in line with the street, with a preserved architectural detail. The rear of the building has been modernized. The ground floor is bossaged. The front façade features a two-story rectangular bay window supported by brackets and rusticated lesenes. The window pediments and under-window panels are decorated with geometric and floral motifs. The entrance portal is semicircular, profiled, and adorned with a keystone shaped like a woman's head.
- Tenement at 15 Wileńska Street – built between 1906 and 1910 in an eclectic style with Art Nouveau elements. A four-story building in line with the street, with a preserved architectural detail. The rear has been modernized. The ground floor is rusticated, and the upper stories are plastered. The front façade features two three-story bay windows with adjoining balconies. The balcony balustrades are adorned with geometric and floral motifs. The entrance is flanked by pilasters.
- Tenement at 17 Wileńska Street – built between 1906 and 1910 in an eclectic style with Art Nouveau elements. The four-story building is in line with the street and has preserved architectural details. The rear has been modernized. The ground floor is rusticated, and the upper stories are plastered. The front façade features a large two-story rectangular bay window. The window frames on the third floor are semicircular and decorated with lion heads. Geometric and floral decorations are mainly visible on the bay window. The entrance is flanked by rusticated pilasters and topped with a semicircular transom with profiled tracery.
- Tenement at 19 Wileńska Street – built between 1906 and 1910 in an eclectic style with Art Nouveau elements. The four-story building is in line with the street and has preserved architectural details. The rear has been modernized. The ground floor is rusticated. The façade is richly decorated with geometric and floral motifs. The central section of the front façade features an avant-corps topped with a gable with wavy lines. The avant-corps is thickened by a semicircular bay window on the second and third floors. Another avant-corps, with a small roof, is located on the opposite side of the building.
- Tenement at 21 Wileńska Street – built between 1906 and 1910 in an eclectic style with Art Nouveau elements. The four-story building is in line with the street and has preserved architectural details. The rear has been modernized. The ground floor is rusticated, and the upper stories are plastered. The front façade features an asymmetrically placed avant-corps with a wavy gable and adjoining loggias on the left side. Above the entrance is a decorative transom. The façade is adorned with geometric, floral, and anthropomorphic decorations.
- Building at 9 Lwowska Street – built in the 1930s in a modernist style, it is commonly called Słoneczko after the sun symbol painted on the front façade. The four-story building is rectangular and features simple architectural forms, with a gable roof.

== Institutions ==
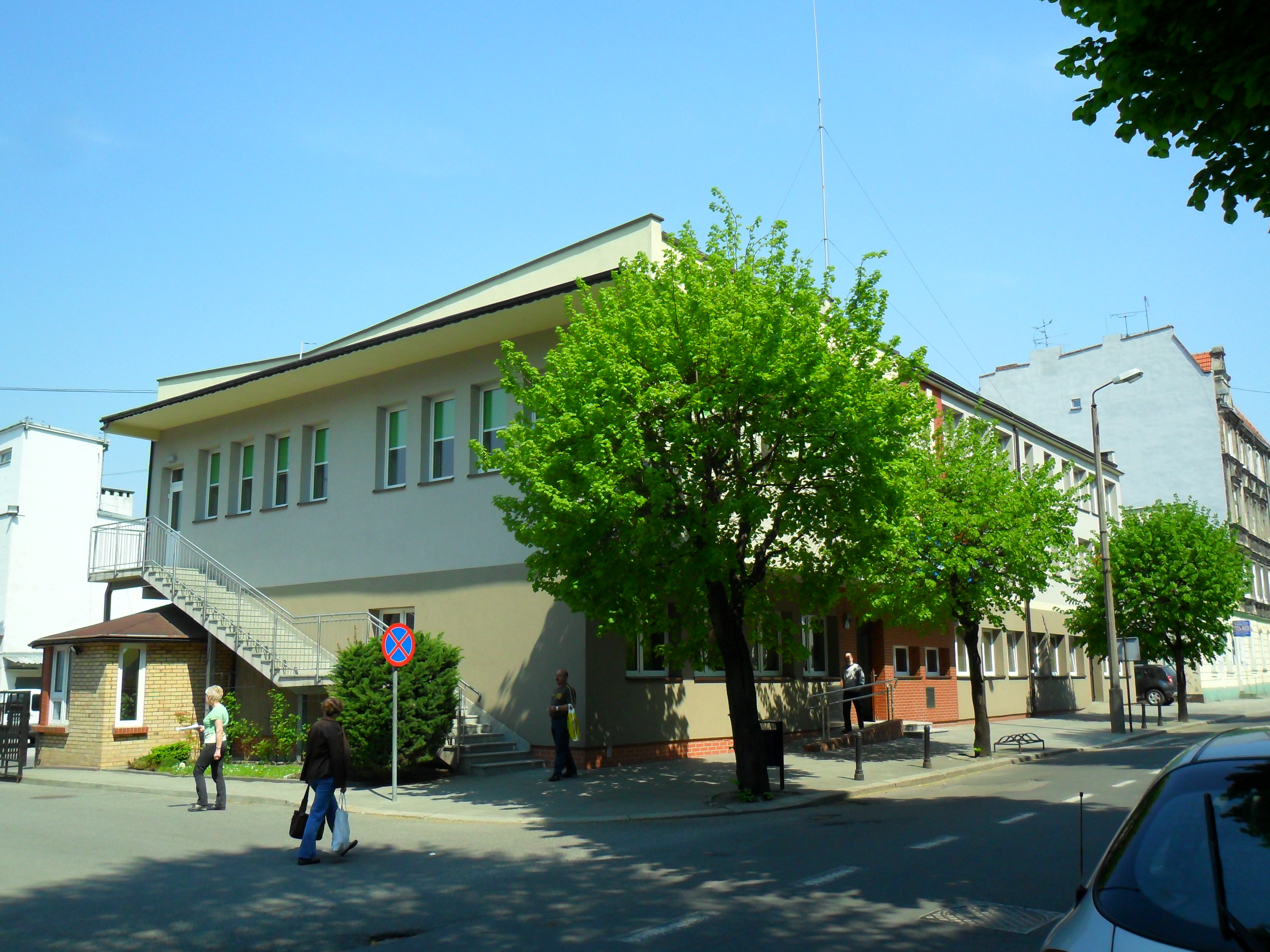
Administrative building of the Nowoczesna Housing Cooperative

=== Nowoczesna Housing Cooperative ===
Located on the site of former pharmacist Frank's gardens, where medicinal herbs were grown, the administrative building of the Nowoczesna Housing Cooperative is at 3 Wileńska Street. This cooperative owns over 6,300 housing units, covering an area of approximately 333,000 m^{2}, which represents one-third of all apartments in Racibórz.

=== Craftsmen's Guild ===
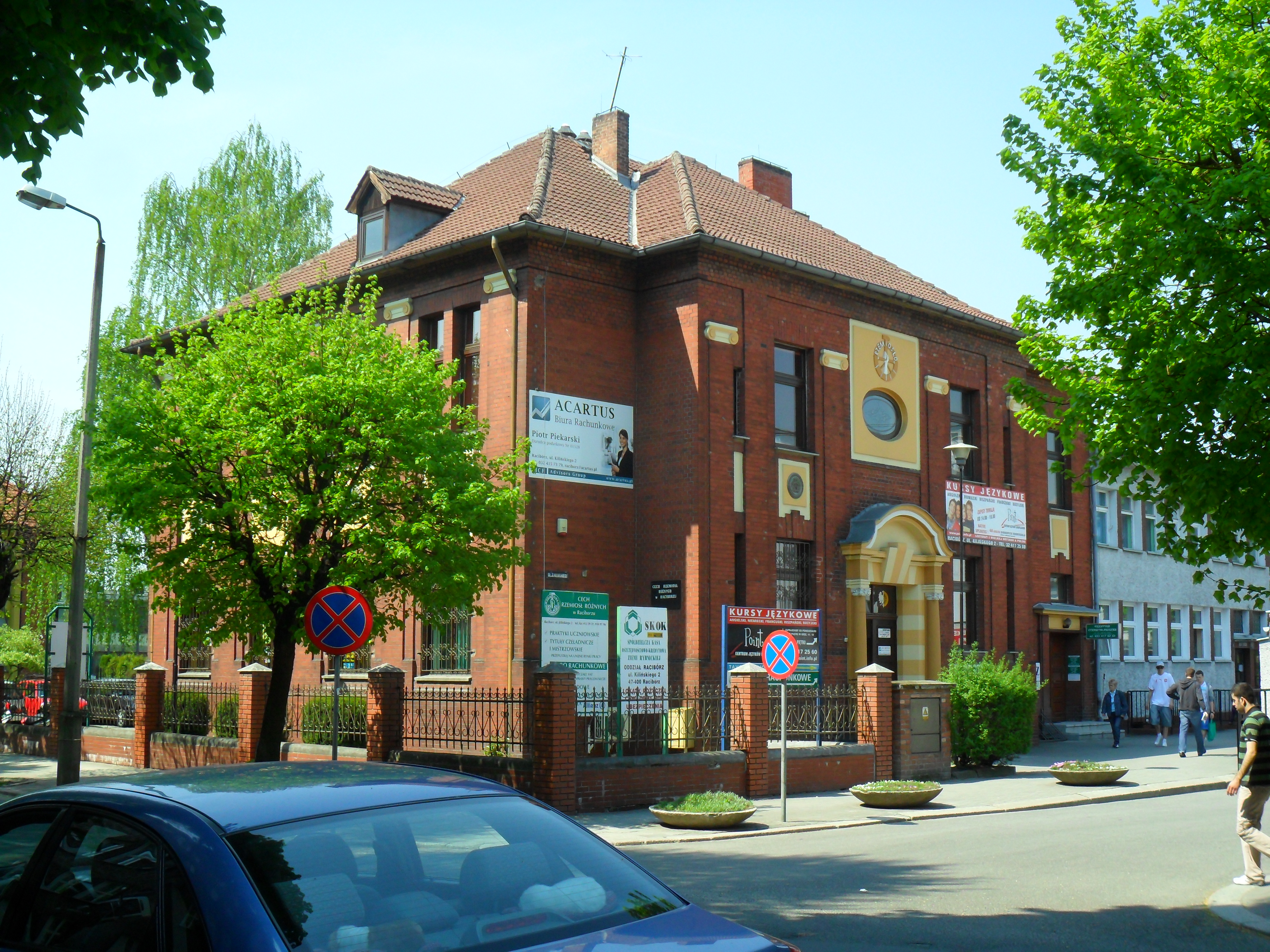
Former evangelical parish house, currently the headquarters of the Craftsmen's Guild

The Craftsmen's Guild, along with several other institutions, occupies the former evangelical parish house at 2 Kilińskiego Street. This building was constructed after 1911. In 1945, it was damaged by fire, and in 1957, the Craftsmen's Guild began rebuilding it, completing the work in 1961. A commemorative plaque was placed on the building, inscribed with: House of Crafts in honor of Jan Kiliński, built by Racibórz's craftsmen between 1957 and 1961 to commemorate the 1,000th anniversary of the Polish state. At that time, the name of the short street, previously called Czarna Street, was changed to Kiliński Street in honor of Jan Kiliński.

The Craftsmen's Guild in Racibórz likely dates back to 1217, with the first documented mention in 1267. Despite the abolition of mandatory guild membership in 1869, the guild system persisted. After World War II, guilds were reorganized in Racibórz, with the first meeting held on 22 June 1945. In 1957, the guild decided to rebuild the former evangelical parish house to serve as its headquarters. The official opening of the new headquarters, where the guild still operates today, took place on 16 July 1961.

=== Civil registry office ===
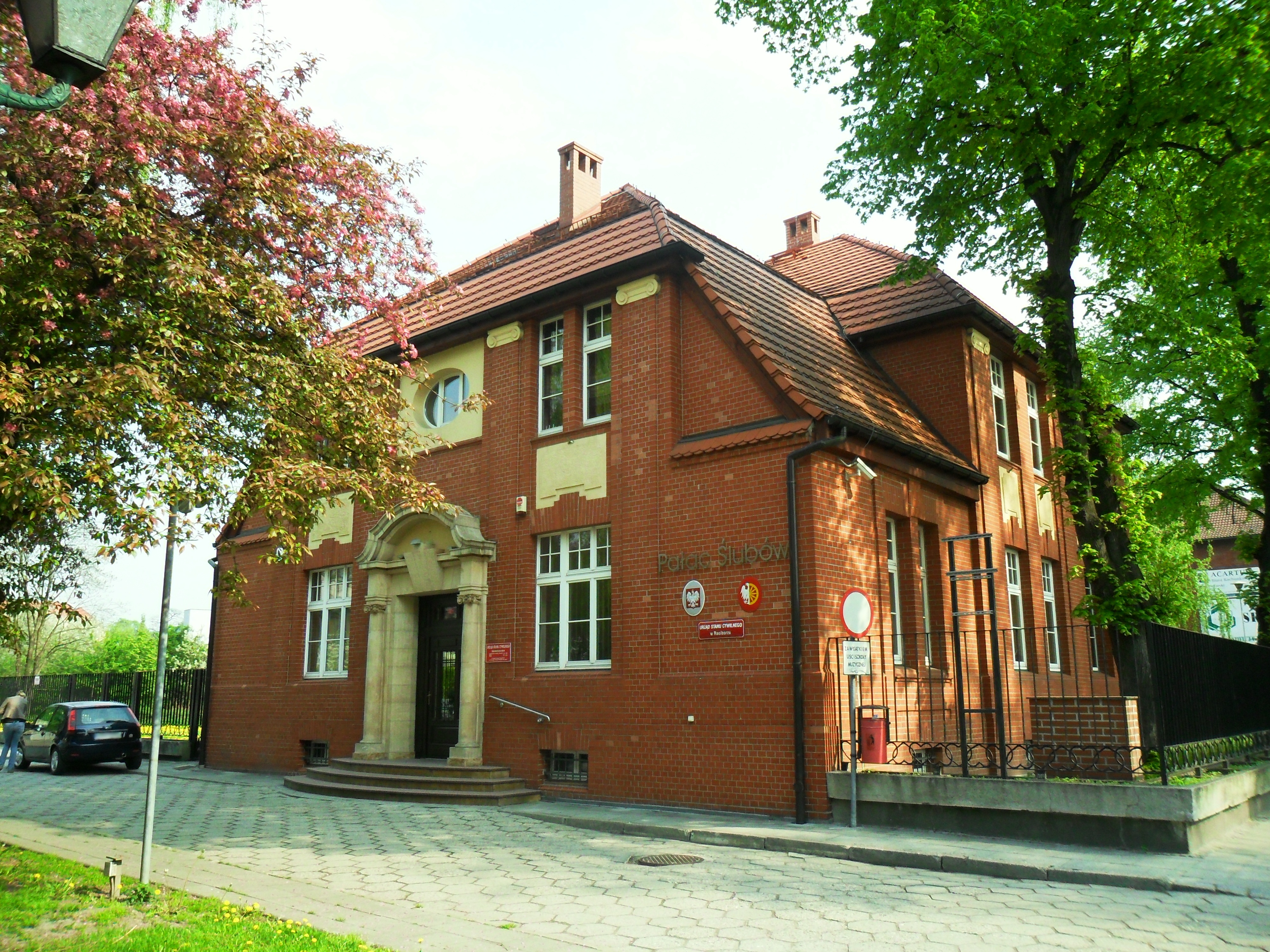
Building of the civil registry office

The building that now houses the civil registry office at 7 Wileńska Street was originally constructed as a rectory for the evangelical church and served this purpose until 1945. After the war, the building, which had survived unscathed, was converted into apartments, and it temporarily hosted evangelical services, which were later moved to a chapel at the evangelical cemetery on Starowiejska Street. In the mid-1960s, the residents were relocated, and on 22 July 1969, the civil registry office moved into the building. In 2005, the building became city property, which allowed for modernization between 2006 and 2007. In exchange, the evangelical parish received the former preschool building at 5 Warszawska Street.

The civil registry office in Racibórz was established in 1874, following the introduction of a unified civil registry system in Germany. Initially, it was a one-person office, with the first civil registrar being the mayor at the time, Robert Schramm. The first entry in the civil registry was a death record, made on 2 October 1874. Over time, other officials began maintaining the registry. The office was initially located in the now-demolished town hall in the market square. After World War II, the new Polish authorities placed the civil registry office and city hall at 6 Batory Street, in the former Franciszek Sobtzick chocolate factory. By the 1960s, a new location for the registry office was sought, as the city hall lacked suitable spaces for wedding ceremonies. The former evangelical rectory was selected, and the office was moved there on 22 July 1969.

=== School of Construction and Crafts ===
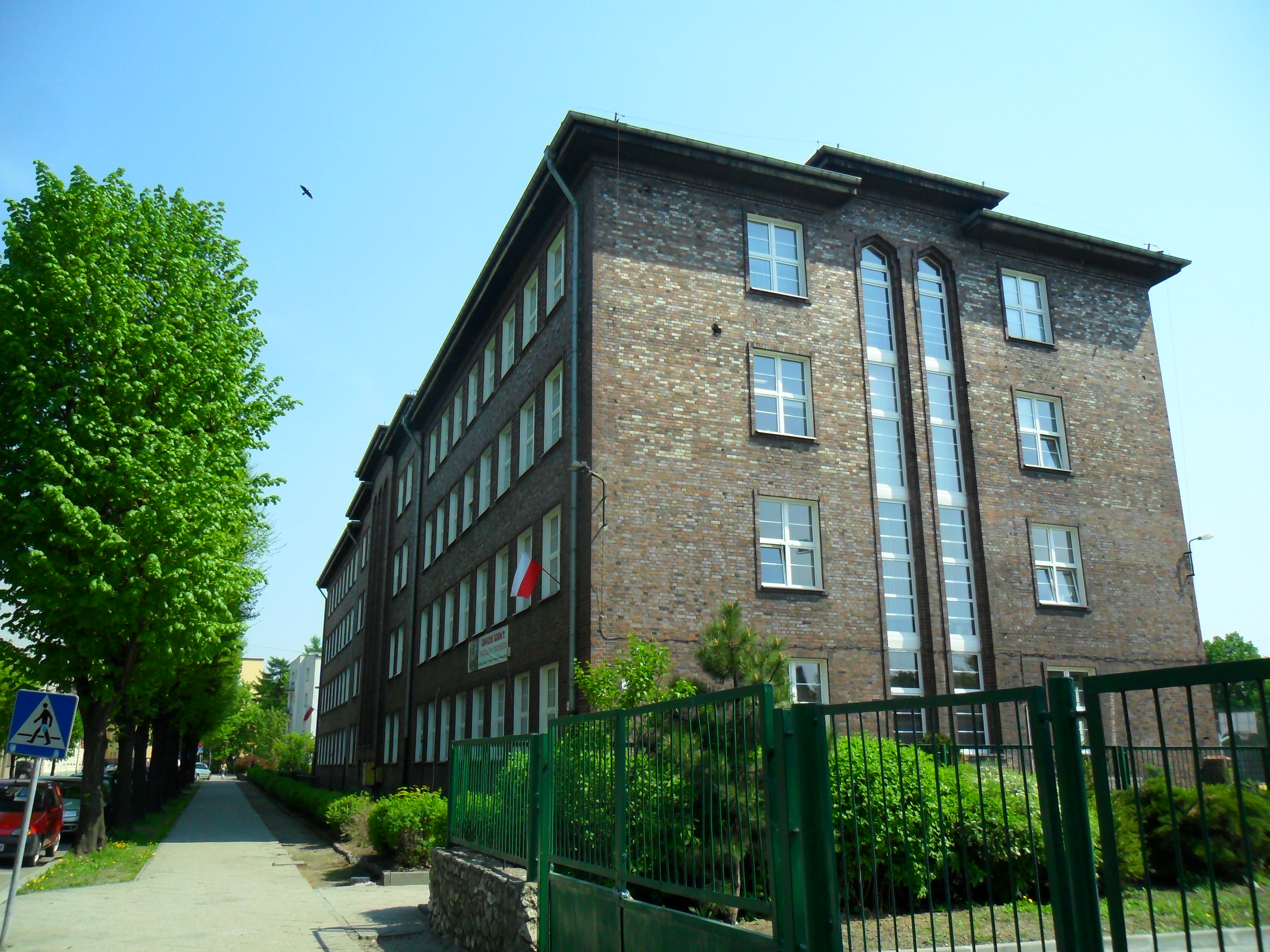
Building of the School of Construction and Crafts

The school building at 6 Wileńska Street, initiated by Adolf Kaschny, was completed in stages, first in 1932 and fully by 1 April 1934. Initially, it housed three vocational schools: the Crafts Vocational School (Gewerbliche Berufsschule), the Merchant School (Kaufmännische Berufschule), the School for Pharmacists (Drogistenfachschule), as well as the Higher Commercial School (Höhere Handelsschule) and the Municipal Commercial School (Städtische Handelsschule). The building was equipped with an air-raid shelter, and in 1944, a lazaretto was established there. Toward the end of World War II, one corner of the building was destroyed by a bomb. On 24 June 1945, the Polish authorities took over the building, and classes resumed as early as 15 October that year. On 1 September 1946, a carpentry class and two additional vocational training classes were launched. Over the years, many types of schools operated in the building. Currently, it houses Technical School No. 2, Supplementary Technical School No. 2 for Adults, Vocational School No. 2, and Post-Secondary School No. 2. The school also includes a gymnasium built in 1894, which originally served as the town's sports hall before the school's establishment.

=== Vocational School Complex ===
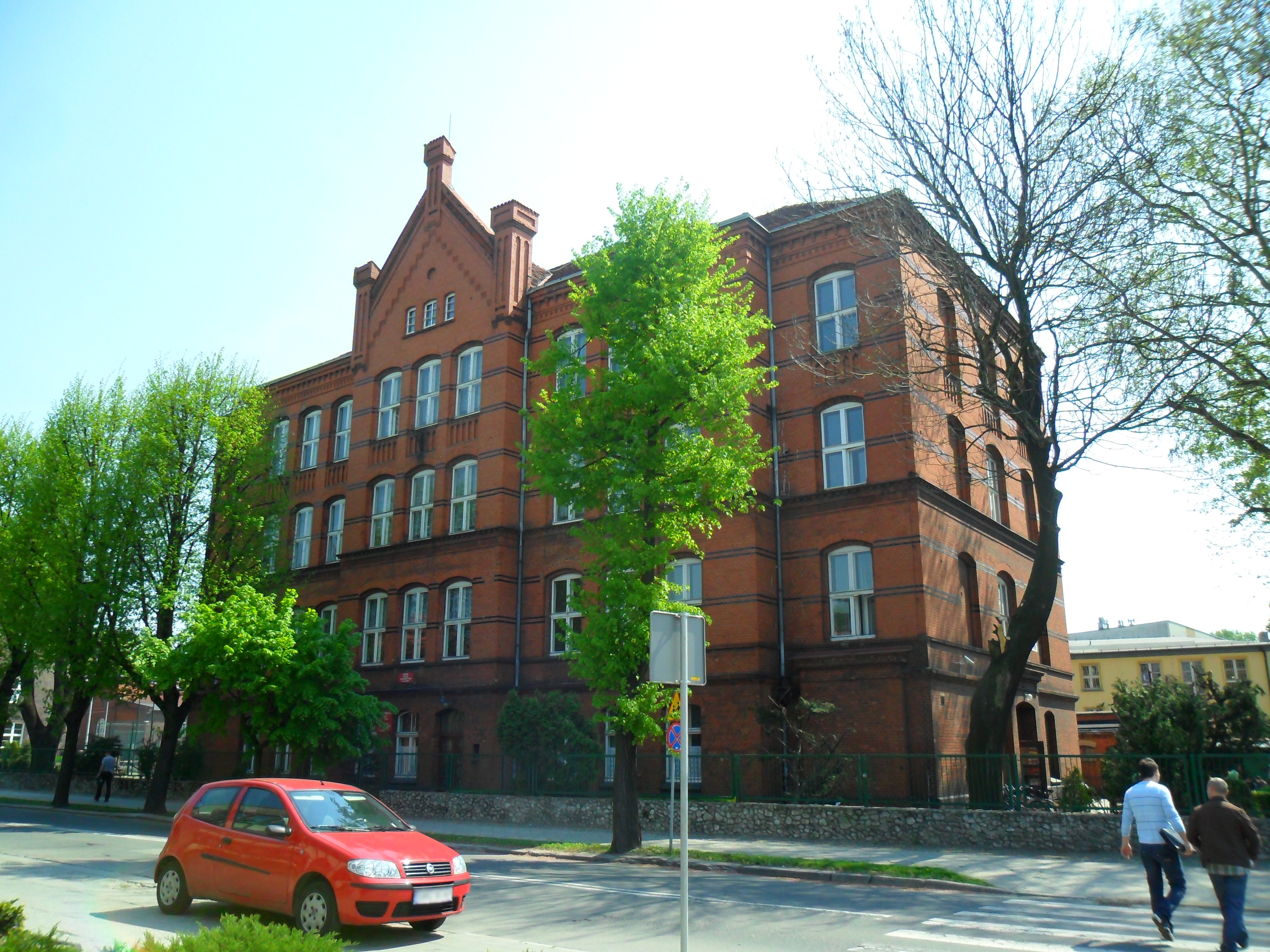
Building of the Vocational School Complex

The building at 8 Wileńska Street, located at the corner near the roundabout with Ogrodowa Street, was constructed in 1908 as a seven-class public school, then known as Hohenzollernschule. In 1945, the building sustained significant damage, but it was rebuilt. On 1 September 1963, the Vocational School was established in the building, and on 1 September 1991, the Vocational School Complex was created, currently comprising Technical School No. 3 and Vocational School No. 3. The school also includes a sports field complex, built in 2010 as part of the Orlik 2012 project.

=== Stanisław Moniuszko State Music School ===
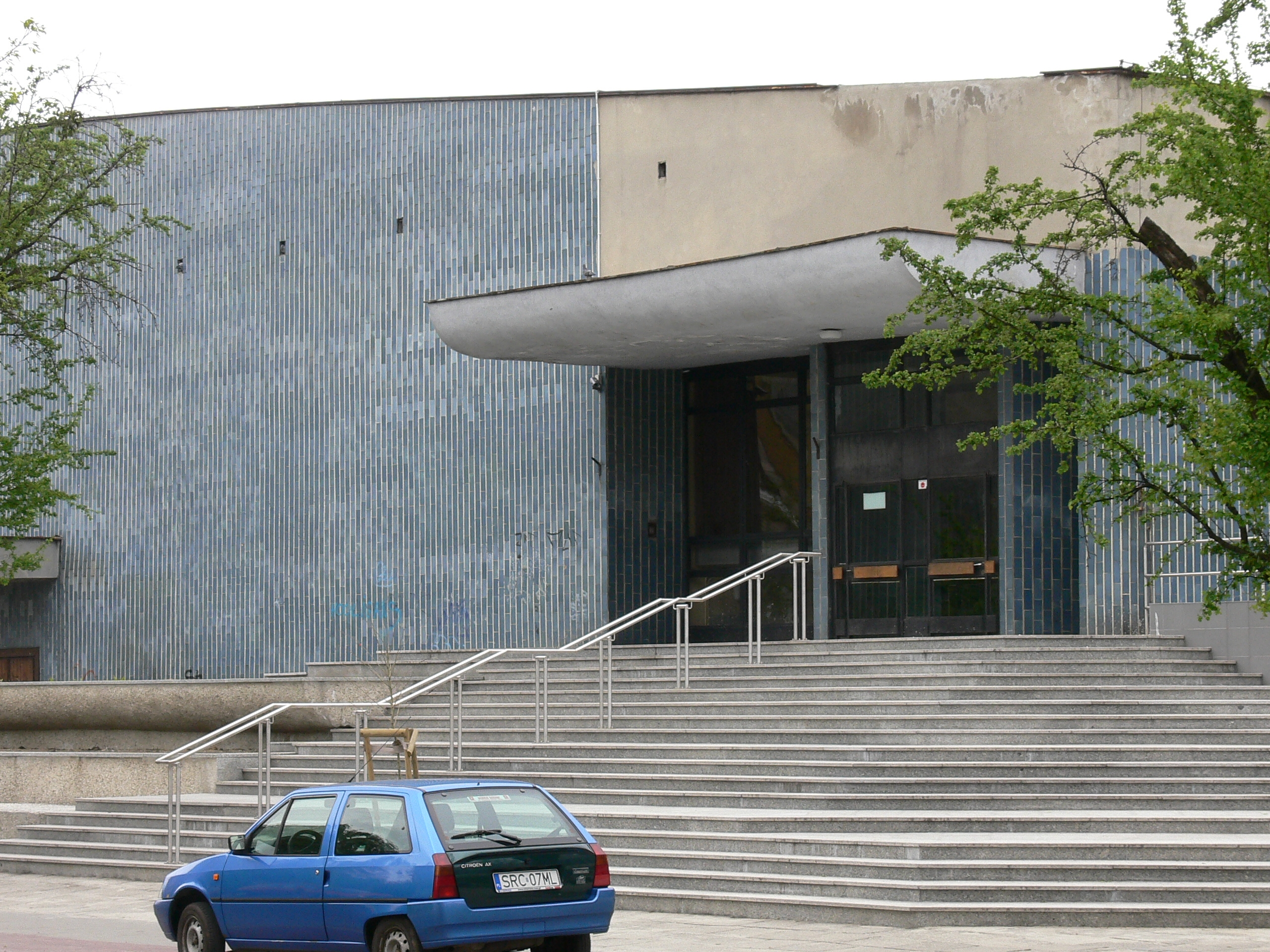
State Music School in Racibórz

The history of the Racibórz music school dates back to the 1950s. On 7 February 1955, Emil Pogoda initiated the establishment of the Social Music Workshop. Initially, it was located in the Economic Schools Complex building. In August 1955, it was moved to Drzymała Street, where the State Music School was also established on 1 September 1961. As the school grew, the existing facilities became insufficient, leading to the construction of the new building, into which the school moved on 1 September 1978. On 23 November 2001, the school was named after Stanisław Moniuszko. The school offers two study programs: a six-year cycle for children aged 6 to 9 and a four-year cycle for youth aged 10 to 16. The building also includes a concert hall with 341 seats.

=== Słoneczko ===
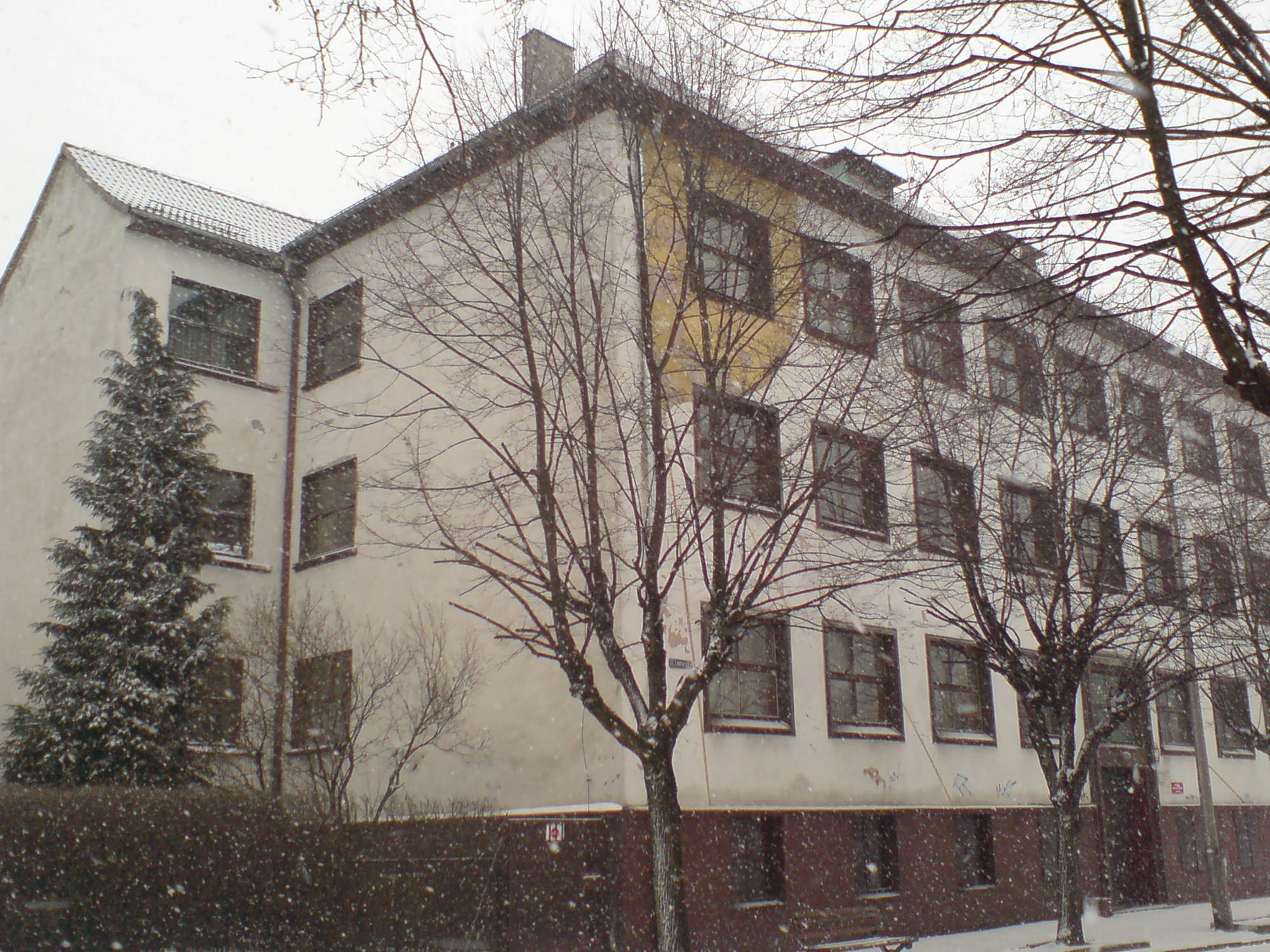
Popular Słoneczko. In the 2009 photo, there is the Sun painted on the building's wall, which no longer exists today

The building at 9 Lwowska Street (on the corner of Wileńska Street, on the eastern side), popularly known as Słoneczko (The Little Sun), owes its name to a now-vanished sun symbol that was once painted on the upper left corner of the front wall. The building was constructed in the 1930s to house several government offices, including the cadastral office, the state building supervision office, and the state district treasury. Inside, special rooms were designated for storing geodetic documentation.

The building survived World War II without any damage. In the late 1950s, the geodetic documentation was moved to 32 Drzymała Street, where the tax office is now located. The building was then repurposed as a dormitory. On 1 September 1988, Primary School No. 17 opened in the building, transferring some students from Primary School No. 15. However, due to a demographic decline, the school faced difficulties in forming new classes. In 1995, it was converted into a branch of Primary School No. 15, and in 1999, it ceased operations. Afterward, the building housed a non-public school, and it now serves the State University of Applied Sciences in Racibórz.

== Layout ==
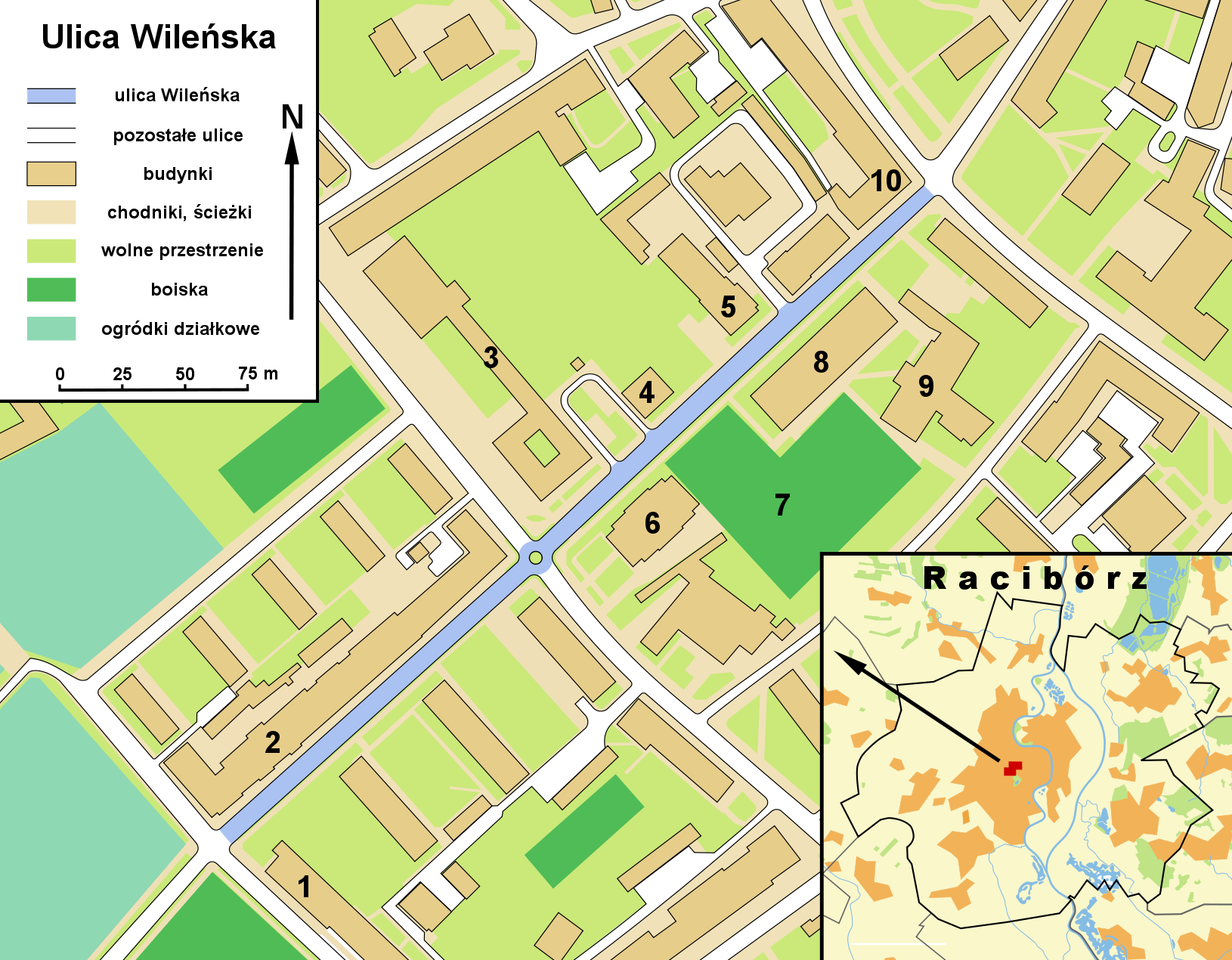
Plan of Wileńska Street. Wileńska Street is highlighted in blue. Explanation: 1. Słoneczko2. Tenements at 13–21 Wileńska Street3. State Music School 4. Civil registry office5. Craftsmen's Guild6. Vocational School Complex 7. Orlik 20128. School of Construction and Crafts9. Gymnasium at the School of Construction and Crafts 10. Tenement at 15 Wojska Polskiego Street

== Bibliography ==
- Newerla, Paweł (2008). Dzieje Raciborza i jego dzielnic [The history of Racibórz and its districts] (in Polish). Racibórz: Wydawnictwo i Agencja Informacyjna WAW. ISBN 978-83-89802-73-6.
- Newerla, Paweł (2007). Raciborski przewodnik genealogiczny [Racibórz Genealogical Guide] (in Polish). Racibórz: Wydawnictwo i Agencja Informacyjna WAW. ISBN 978-83-89802-48-4.
- Gałecka-Paduchowa, Alicja (2001). Kamienice Raciborza [Tenements of Racibórz] (in Polish). Katowice: Centrum Dziedzictwa Kulturowego Górnego Śląska. ISBN 83-85871-25-X.
- Wawoczny, Grzegorz (2007). Zabytki powiatu raciborskiego [Monuments of Racibórz County] (PDF) (in Polish). Racibórz: Wydawnictwo i Agencja Informacyjna WAW. ISBN 978-83-89802-36-1.
- Gałecka-Paduchowa, Alicja (2004). Zabytkowa architektura municypalna i przemysłowa Raciborza [Historic municipal and industrial architecture of Racibórz] (in Polish). Katowice: Centrum Dziedzictwa Kulturowego Górnego Śląska. ISBN 83-85871-36-5.
