= Orlik 2012 =

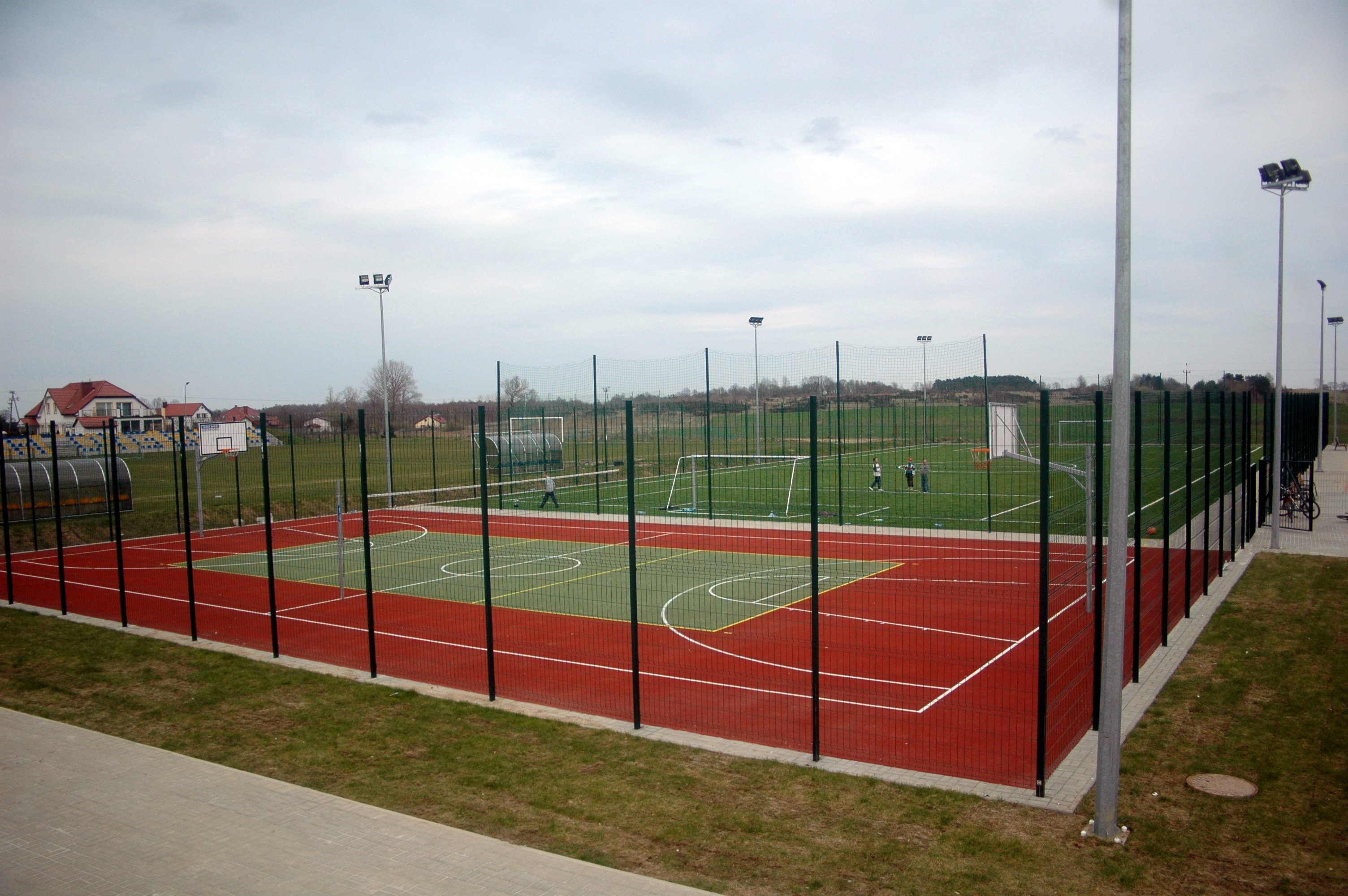
Example of a multisport pitch in Dygowo

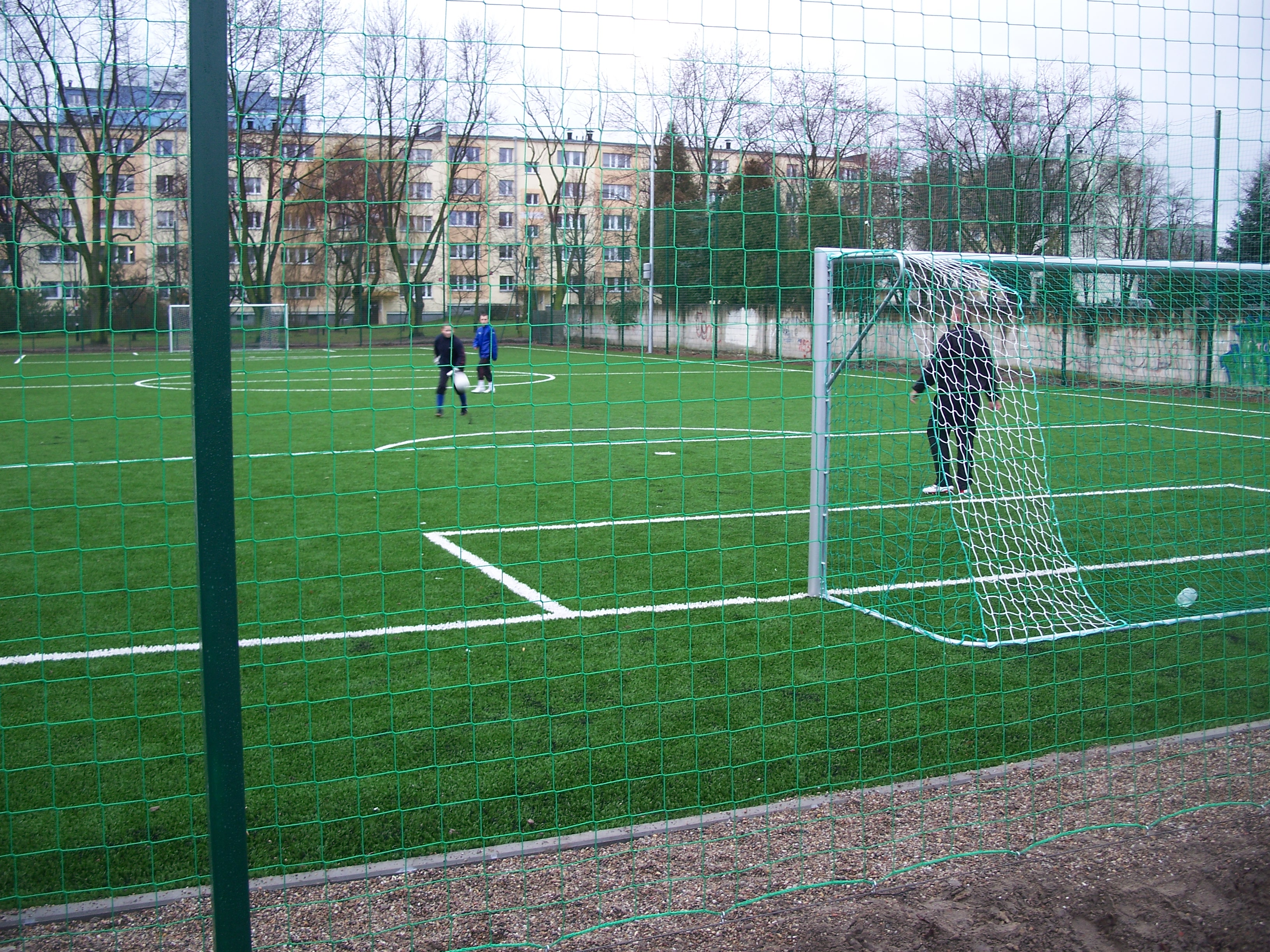

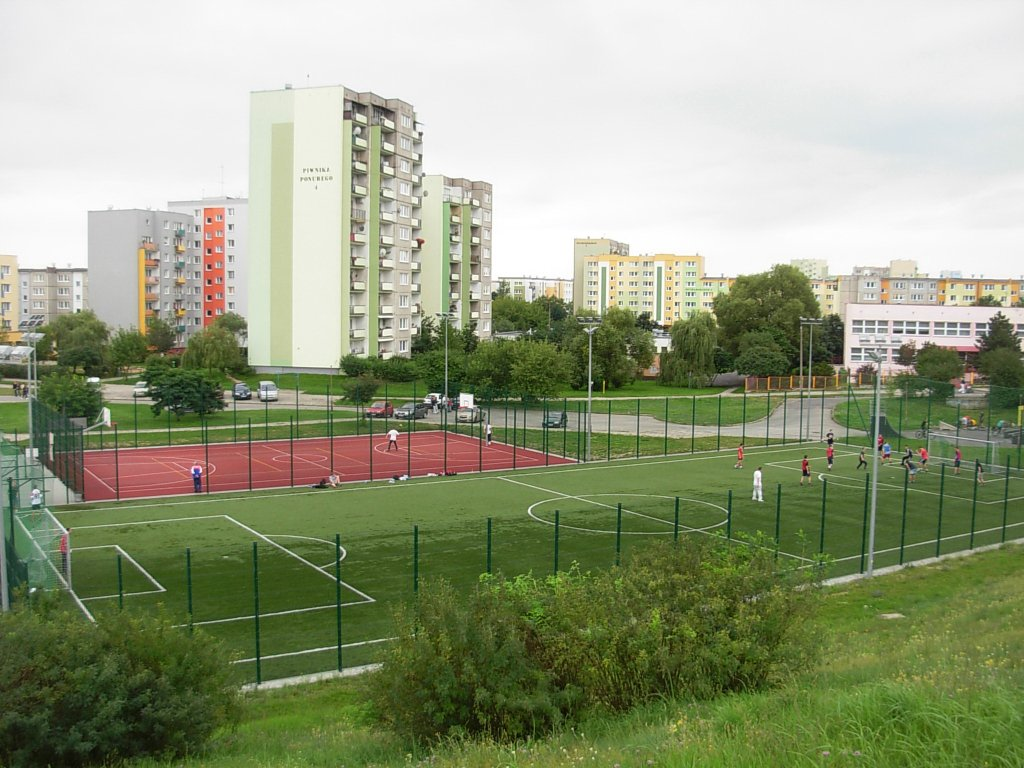
A Football and smaller Multisport pitch in Bydgoszcz

Orlik 2012 or simply Orlik was a Polish government project to build small scale football and multisport volleyball–basketball pitches in each gmina in Poland before the UEFA Euro 2012. As of 2010 there were 2,479 gminas throughout the country. Orlik sites were usually built within the grounds of elementary or junior high schools. The name (small eagle) refers to the coat of arms of Poland, while the Polish national teams are called the eagles.

== Financing ==
A single location costed around 1 million Polish Złoty (300 000 U.S. dollars) and was equally financed by the State Treasury, voivodeship and gmina.
