= Stary Dziebałtów =

- Village
- Location within Poland
- Coordinates: 51°8′55″N 20°20′24″E
- Country: Poland
- Voivodeship: Świętokrzyskie
- County: Końskie
- Gmina: Końskie
- Population: 432
- Postal code: 26-200
- Vehicle registration: TKN

Stary Dziebałtów [ˈstarɨ d͡ʑɛˈbau̯tuf] is a village in the administrative district of Gmina Końskie, within Końskie County, Świętokrzyskie Voivodeship, in south-central Poland. It lies approximately 8 km (5 mi) south-west of Końskie and 36 km (22 mi) north-west of the regional capital Kielce.

In the year 1975-1998 the village belonged to the kielce voivodeship

Roman catholic believers in the village belong to the Saint Raphael Kalinowski parish in Dziebałtów

== Parts of the village ==
Parts of the village stary dziebałtów
SIMC	Name	Type
0244268	Brzezina	part of the village
0244274	Zapłocie	part of the village

== History ==
the earliest mention of Dziebałtów is from 1222 when it was supposedly named Dhibaldhiciej. At that time it belonged to Dobiesław son of Wisław of the Odrowąż family

In Długosz's writings it is called "Dzibalthow" , settled in the Końskie powiat. According to Długosz it belonged to the Brzezina parish (Kielce powiat). It belonged to Andrzej of the Jelita coat of arms. The tithe was collected by the parish priest in Brezizny. There was also a Wola Dziebałtowska (L.B. t.II, s.457). According to a conscription register from 1577, Dziebałtów, Brody, and Sokołów, constituted one whole divided into several sections, Which was held by the Dziebałtowski family.

=== World war II ===
Germans entered Dziebałtów on the 8th of september 1939. During the occupation relations between the villagers and germans were good. German officers used village houses as headquarters, other soldiers did artillery training in the fields.. In the night between the 26th and 27th august 1944 the 2nd Legions Infantry Regiment of the AK led by Captain Tadeusz Pytlakowski "Tarnina" attacked Dziebałtów with the goal of taking over german artillery. The attack began at 1 AM on the 27th however the AK failed to catch the germans by surprise. The regiment managed to destroy some artillery however the overall attack failed. Sources vary as to the strength and death count however most agree that there were 10-30 AK soldiers and a similar amount of Germans
