= Koczwara =

- Village
- Location within Poland
- Coordinates: 51°11′18″N 20°26′19″E
- Country: Poland
- Voivodeship: Świętokrzyskie
- County: Końskie
- Gmina: Końskie
- Population: 200

Koczwara [kɔt͡ʂˈfara] is a village in the administrative district of Gmina Końskie, within Końskie County, Świętokrzyskie Voivodeship, in south-central Poland. It lies approximately 3 km (2 mi) south-east of Końskie and 37 km (23 mi) north of the regional capital Kielce.
