= Rogów, Końskie County =

Rogów
- Village
- Location within Poland
- Coordinates: 51°12′12″N 20°26′7″E
- Country: Poland
- Voivodeship: Świętokrzyskie
- County: Końskie
- Gmina: Końskie
- Population: 1,300

Rogów [ˈrɔɡuf] is a village in the administrative district of Gmina Końskie, within Końskie County, Świętokrzyskie Voivodeship, in south-central Poland. It lies approximately 2 km (1 mi) east of Końskie and 38 km (24 mi) north of the regional capital Kielce.
