= Głupiów =

- Village
- Location within Poland
- Coordinates: 51°11′6″N 20°15′17″E
- Country: Poland
- Voivodeship: Świętokrzyskie
- County: Końskie
- Gmina: Końskie

Głupiów [ˈɡwupjuf] is a village in the administrative district of Gmina Końskie, within Końskie County, Świętokrzyskie Voivodeship, in south-central Poland. It lies approximately 12 km (7 mi) west of Końskie and 42 km (26 mi) north-west of the regional capital Kielce.
