= Fidor =

- Village
- Location within Poland
- Coordinates: 51°13′51″N 20°29′12″E
- Country: Poland
- Voivodeship: Świętokrzyskie
- County: Końskie
- Gmina: Końskie
- Population: 160

Fidor [ˈfidɔr] is a village in the administrative district of Gmina Końskie, within Końskie County, Świętokrzyskie Voivodeship, in south-central Poland. It lies approximately 6 km (4 mi) north-east of Końskie and 40 km (25 mi) north of the regional capital Kielce.
