= Pomyków, Świętokrzyskie Voivodeship =

Pomyków
- Village
- Location within Poland
- Coordinates: 51°10′52″N 20°26′37″E
- Country: Poland
- Voivodeship: Świętokrzyskie
- County: Końskie
- Gmina: Końskie
- Population: 350

Pomyków [pɔˈmɨkuf] is a village in the administrative district of Gmina Końskie, within Końskie County, Świętokrzyskie Voivodeship, in south-central Poland. It lies approximately 3 km (2 mi) south-east of Końskie and 36 km (22 mi) north of the regional capital Kielce.
