= Piła, Końskie County =

Piła
- Village
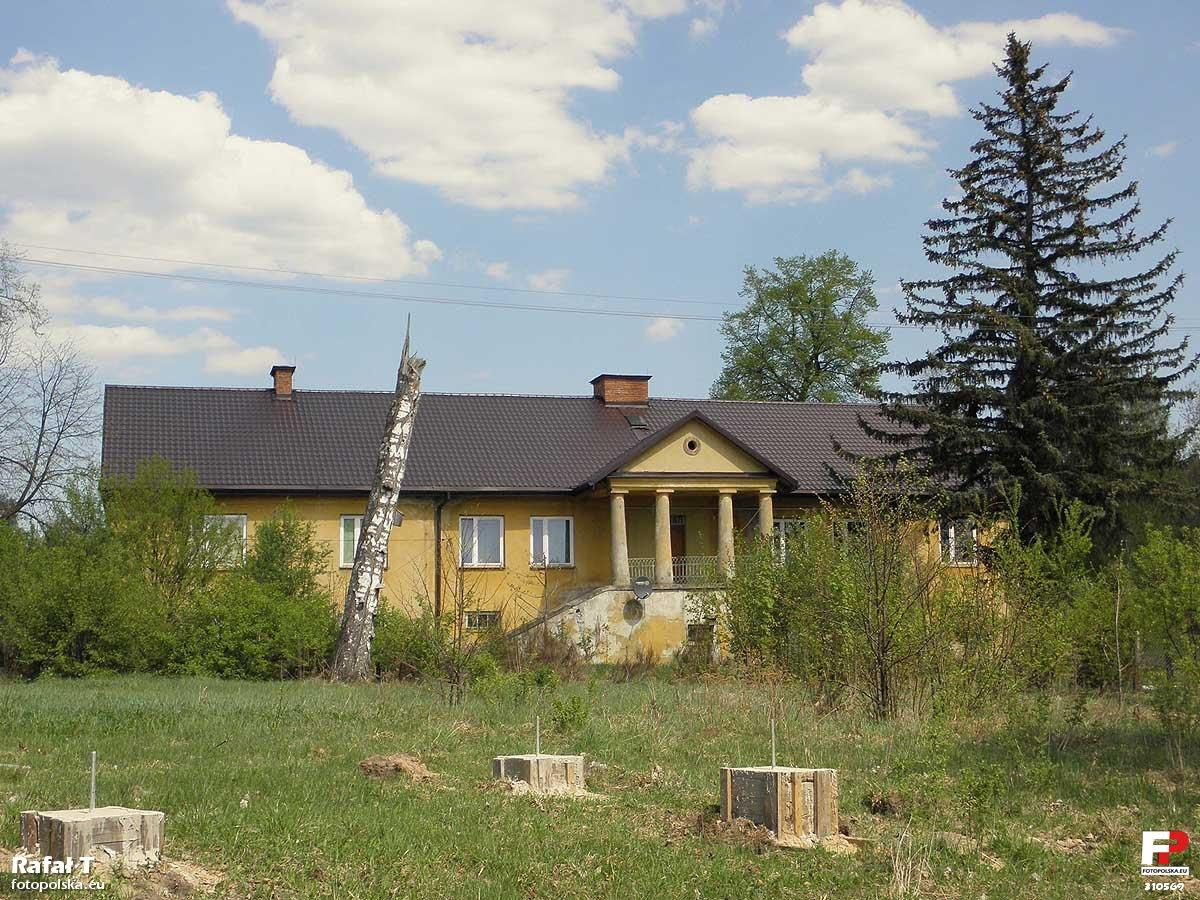
- Manor house

- Location within Poland
- Coordinates: 51°10′48″N 20°27′35″E
- Country: Poland
- Voivodeship: Świętokrzyskie
- County: Końskie
- Gmina: Końskie
- Population: 510

Piła [ˈpiwa] is a village in the administrative district of Gmina Końskie, within Końskie County, Świętokrzyskie Voivodeship, in south-central Poland. It lies approximately 4 km (2 mi) south-east of Końskie and 35 km (22 mi) north of the regional capital Kielce.
