= Pomorzany, Świętokrzyskie Voivodeship =

Pomorzany
- Village
- Location within Poland
- Coordinates: 51°12′34″N 20°19′47″E
- Country: Poland
- Voivodeship: Świętokrzyskie
- County: Końskie
- Gmina: Końskie
- Population: 270

Pomorzany [pɔmɔˈʐanɨ] is a village in the administrative district of Gmina Końskie, within Końskie County, Świętokrzyskie Voivodeship, in south-central Poland. It lies approximately 7 km (4 mi) west of Końskie and 42 km (26 mi) north-west of the regional capital Kielce.
