= Wincentów, Końskie County =

Wincentów
- Village
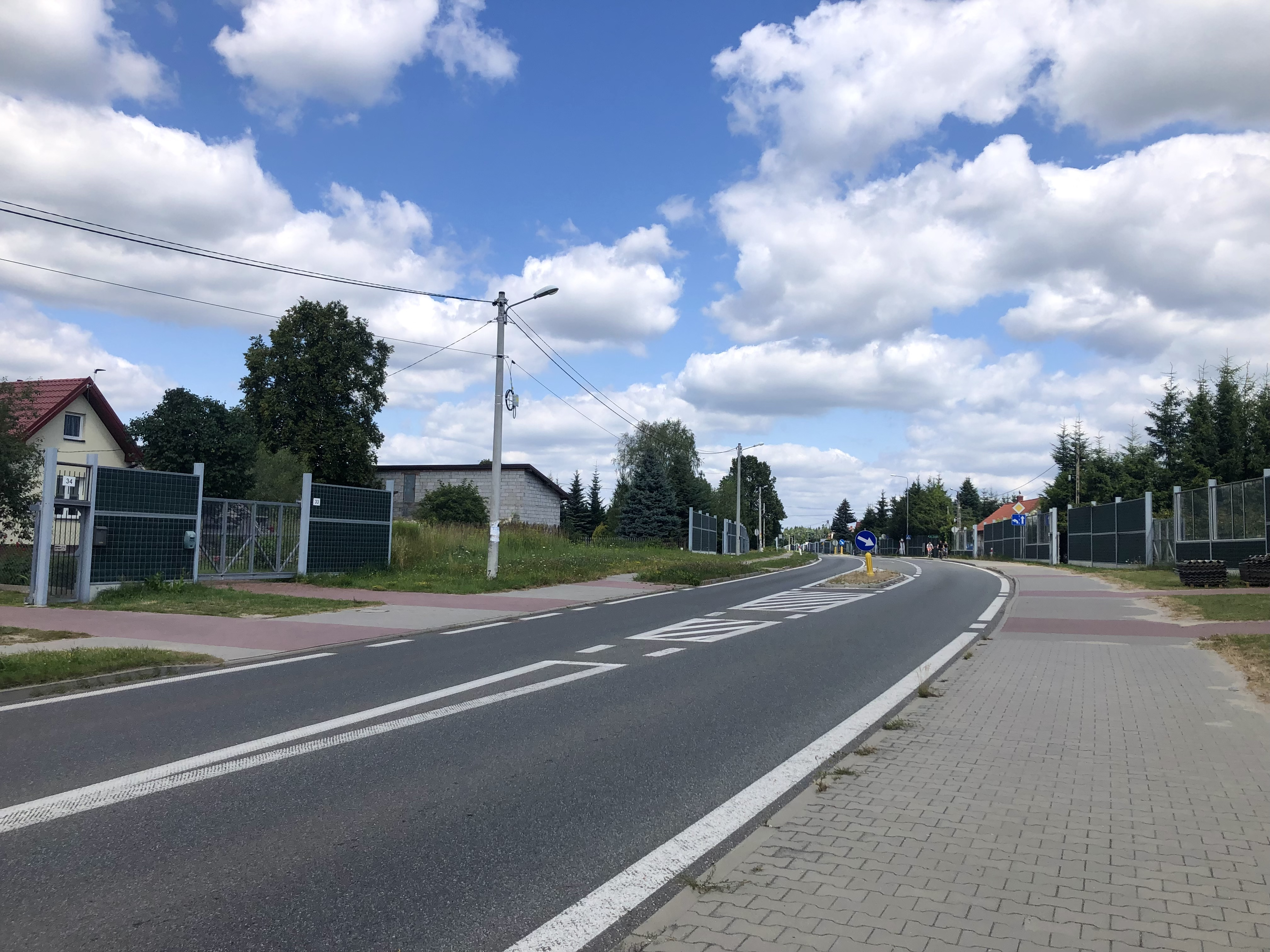

- Location within Poland
- Coordinates: 51°8′42″N 20°21′47″E
- Country: Poland
- Voivodeship: Świętokrzyskie
- County: Końskie
- Gmina: Końskie
- Population: 240

Wincentów [vinˈt͡sɛntuf] is a village in the administrative district of Gmina Końskie, within Końskie County, Świętokrzyskie Voivodeship, in south-central Poland. It lies approximately 8 km (5 mi) south-west of Końskie and 35 km (22 mi) north-west of the regional capital Kielce.
