= Gracuch =

- Village
- Location within Poland
- Coordinates: 51°13′46″N 20°21′33″E
- Country: Poland
- Voivodeship: Świętokrzyskie
- County: Końskie
- Gmina: Końskie
- Population: 190

Gracuch [ˈɡrat͡sux] is a village in the administrative district of Gmina Końskie, within Końskie County, Świętokrzyskie Voivodeship, in south-central Poland. It lies approximately 6 km (4 mi) north-west of Końskie and 43 km (27 mi) north-west of the regional capital Kielce.
