= Kornica, Świętokrzyskie Voivodeship =

Kornica
- Village
- Location within Poland
- Coordinates: 51°13′3″N 20°24′23″E
- Country: Poland
- Voivodeship: Świętokrzyskie
- County: Końskie
- Gmina: Końskie
- Population: 460

Kornica [kɔrˈnit͡sa] is a village in the administrative district of Gmina Końskie, within Końskie County, Świętokrzyskie Voivodeship, in south-central Poland. It lies approximately 3 km (2 mi) north of Końskie and 40 km (25 mi) north of the regional capital Kielce.
