= Paruchy =

- Village
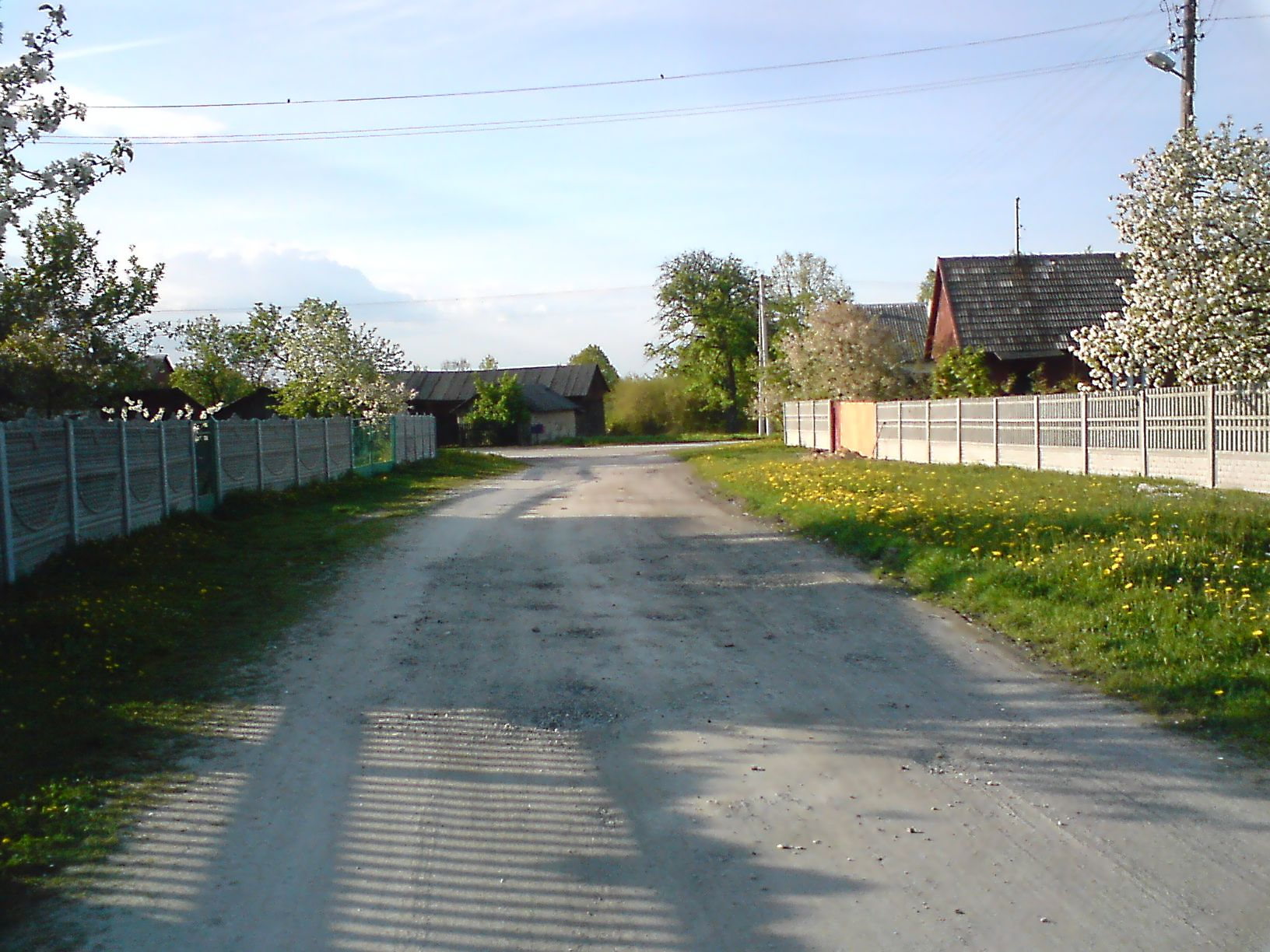

- Location within Poland
- Coordinates: 51°13′37″N 20°33′6″E
- Country: Poland
- Voivodeship: Świętokrzyskie
- County: Końskie
- Gmina: Końskie
- Population: 200

Paruchy [paˈruxɨ] is a village in the administrative district of Gmina Końskie, within Końskie County, Świętokrzyskie Voivodeship, in south-central Poland. It lies approximately 10 km (6 mi) east of Końskie and 39 km (24 mi) north of the regional capital Kielce.
