= Nowy Sokołów =

- Village
- Location within Poland
- Coordinates: 51°8′1″N 20°17′22″E
- Country: Poland
- Voivodeship: Świętokrzyskie
- County: Końskie
- Gmina: Końskie
- Population: 120

Nowy Sokołów [ˈnɔvɨ sɔˈkɔwuf] is a village in the administrative district of Gmina Końskie, within Końskie County, Świętokrzyskie Voivodeship, in south-central Poland. It lies approximately 12 km (7 mi) south-west of Końskie and 37 km (23 mi) north-west of the regional capital Kielce.
