= Poraj, Świętokrzyskie Voivodeship =

Poraj
- Village
- Location within Poland
- Coordinates: 51°15′9″N 20°15′3″E
- Country: Poland
- Voivodeship: Świętokrzyskie
- County: Końskie
- Gmina: Końskie
- Population: 40

Poraj [ˈpɔrai̯] is a village in the administrative district of Gmina Końskie, within Końskie County, Świętokrzyskie Voivodeship, in south-central Poland. It lies approximately 13 km (8 mi) north-west of Końskie and 49 km (30 mi) north-west of the regional capital Kielce.
