= Chełb =

- Village
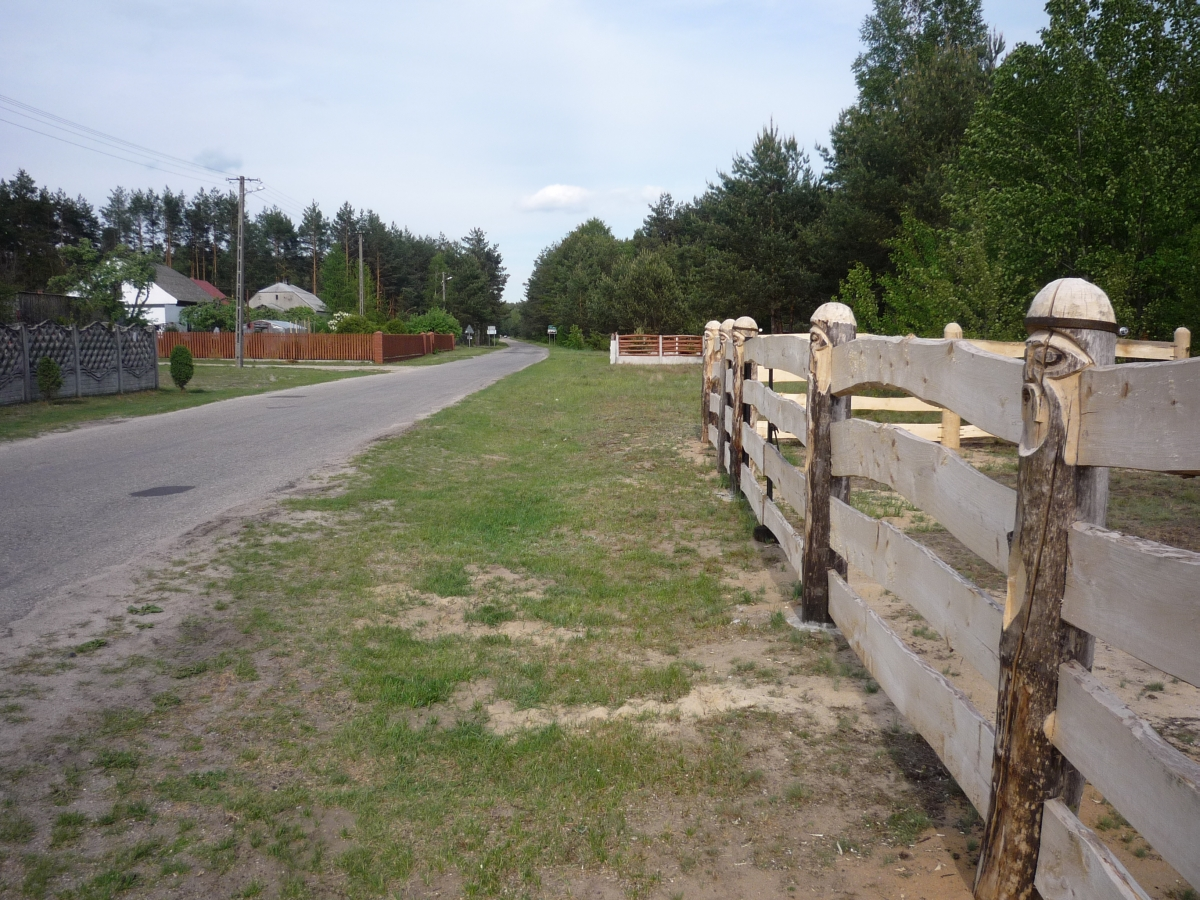

- Location within Poland
- Coordinates: 51°13′N 20°30′E
- Country: Poland
- Voivodeship: Świętokrzyskie
- County: Końskie
- Gmina: Końskie

Chełb [xɛu̯p] is a village in the administrative district of Gmina Końskie, within Końskie County, Świętokrzyskie Voivodeship, in south-central Poland. It lies approximately 7 km (4 mi) east of Końskie and 38 km (24 mi) north of the regional capital Kielce.
