= Sworzyce, Świętokrzyskie Voivodeship =

Sworzyce
- Village
- Location within Poland
- Coordinates: 51°13′54″N 20°15′57″E
- Country: Poland
- Voivodeship: Świętokrzyskie
- County: Końskie
- Gmina: Końskie
- Population: 290

Sworzyce [sfɔˈʐɨt͡sɛ] is a village in the administrative district of Gmina Końskie, within Końskie County, Świętokrzyskie Voivodeship, in south-central Poland. It lies approximately 12 km (7 mi) west of Końskie and 46 km (29 mi) north-west of the regional capital Kielce.
