= Górny Młyn, Świętokrzyskie Voivodeship =

Górny Młyn
- Village
- Location within Poland
- Coordinates: 51°10′26″N 20°26′34″E
- Country: Poland
- Voivodeship: Świętokrzyskie
- County: Końskie
- Gmina: Końskie

Górny Młyn [ˈɡurnɨ ˈmwɨn] is a village in the administrative district of Gmina Końskie, within Końskie County, Świętokrzyskie Voivodeship, in south-central Poland. It lies approximately 4 km (2 mi) south-east of Końskie and 35 km (22 mi) north of the regional capital Kielce.
