= Drutarnia =

- Village
- Location within Poland
- Coordinates: 51°12′50″N 20°28′33″E
- Country: Poland
- Voivodeship: Świętokrzyskie
- County: Końskie
- Gmina: Końskie

Drutarnia [druˈtarɲa] is a village in the administrative district of Gmina Końskie, within Końskie County, Świętokrzyskie Voivodeship, in south-central Poland. It lies approximately 5 km (3 mi) east of Końskie and 38 km (24 mi) north of the regional capital Kielce.
