= Izabelów, Świętokrzyskie Voivodeship =

Izabelów
- Village
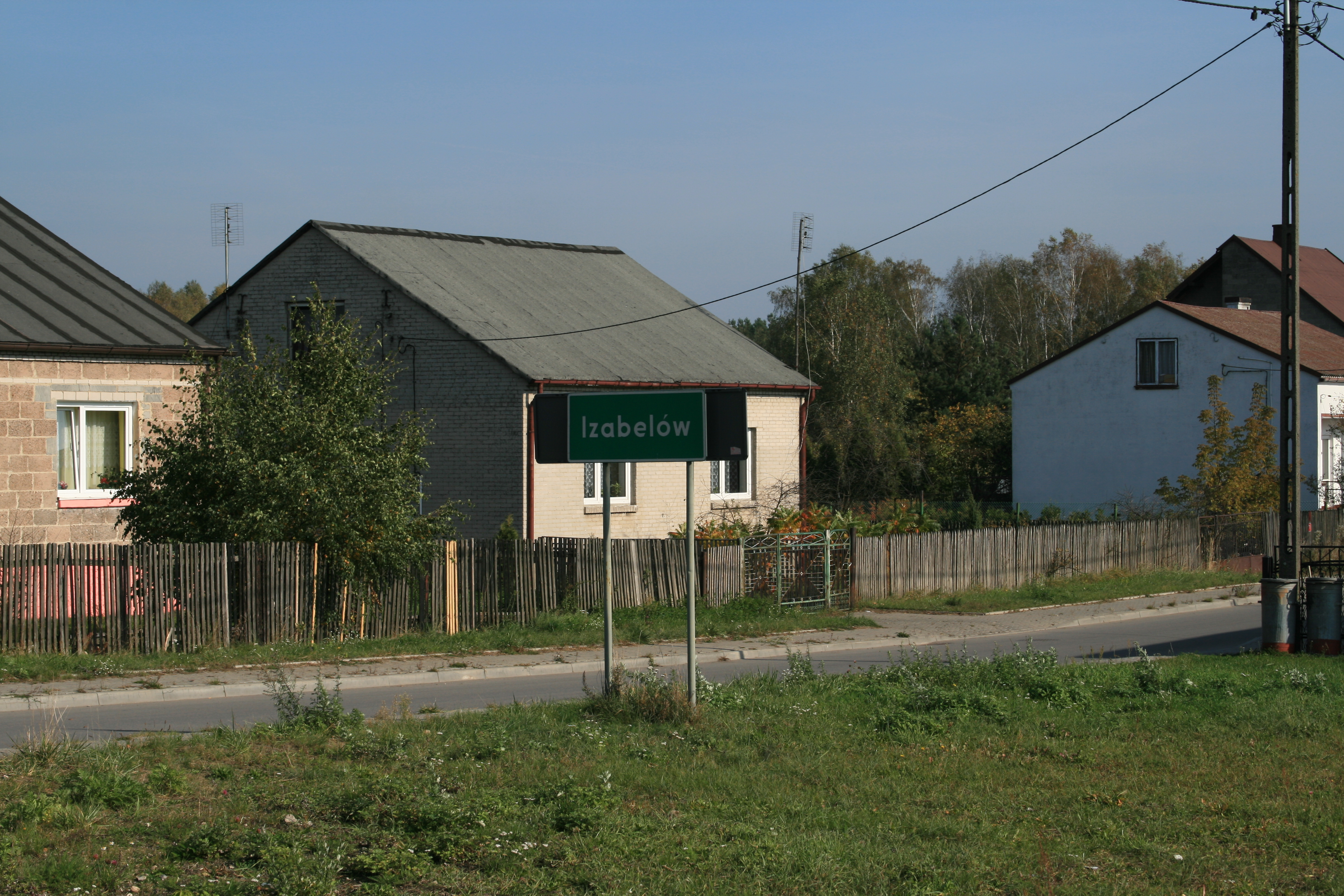

- Location within Poland
- Coordinates: 51°10′8″N 20°25′32″E
- Country: Poland
- Voivodeship: Świętokrzyskie
- County: Końskie
- Gmina: Końskie
- Population: 330

Izabelów [izaˈbɛluf] is a village in the administrative district of Gmina Końskie, within Końskie County, Świętokrzyskie Voivodeship, in south-central Poland. It lies approximately 4 km (2 mi) south of Końskie and 35 km (22 mi) north-west of the regional capital Kielce.
