= Modliszewice =

- Village
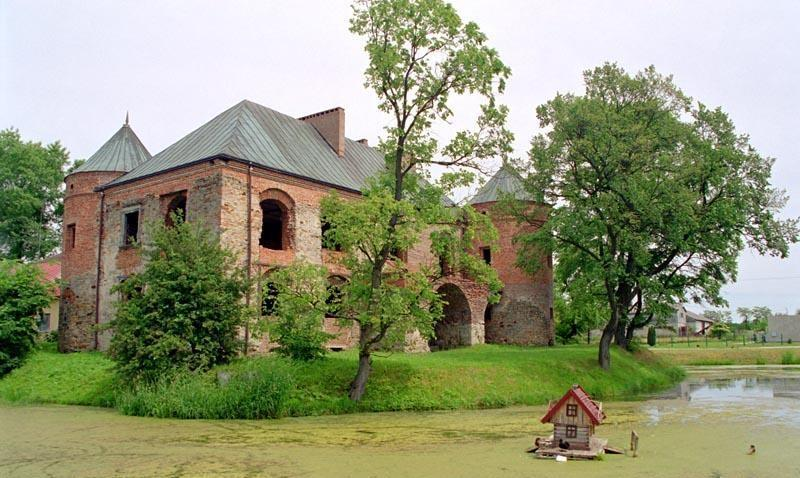
- Ruins of fortified manor house

- Location within Poland
- Coordinates: 51°12′13″N 20°21′54″E
- Country: Poland
- Voivodeship: Świętokrzyskie
- County: Końskie
- Gmina: Końskie
- Population (2021): 1,241
- Zip code: 26-200
- Vehicle registration: TKN

Modliszewice [mɔdliʂɛˈvit͡sɛ] is a village in the administrative district of Gmina Końskie, within Końskie County, Świętokrzyskie Voivodeship, in south-central Poland. It lies approximately 4 km (2 mi) west of Końskie and 40 km (25 mi) north-west of the regional capital Kielce.

The village had a population of 1,370 in 2016. That number fell to 1,241 in 2021.

== History ==
Modliszewice (lit. village of mantis) is first mentioned in documents from the 13th century, and in Liber Beneficiorum Łaski (vol. I, 701). In the 15th century, the land was owned by feudal lord Andrzej Modliszewski

The village is home to Modliszewice Manor, a 16th century manor owned by feudal lord Andrzeij Modliszewski. The manor was purchased by bishop Jan Lipski in the 17th century, but it was partially destroyed and was abandoned in the 19th century, and its remnants are still standning in the village.

In 2022, the government renovated more than half a kilometer of dilapidated and decaying roads in the town.

== Geography ==
Modliszewice is divided into 6 sections.

Sections of Village
| SIMC | Name |
|---|---|
| 1017528 | Karolinów |
| 1017630 | Nowa Droga |
| 1017770 | Szpital |
| 1017801 | W Gościńcu |
| 1017830 | Za Karczmą |
| 1017853 | Za Stawem |
