= Gatniki =

- Village
- Location within Poland
- Coordinates: 51°7′51″N 20°21′55″E
- Country: Poland
- Voivodeship: Świętokrzyskie
- County: Końskie
- Gmina: Końskie
- Population: 150

Gatniki (Polish pronunciation: [ɡatˈɲikʲi]) is a village in the administrative district of Gmina Końskie, within Końskie County, Świętokrzyskie Voivodeship, in south-central Poland. It lies approximately 9 km (6 mi) south-west of Końskie and 33 km (21 mi) north-west of the regional capital Kielce.
