= Małachów, Świętokrzyskie Voivodeship =

Małachów
- Village
- Location within Poland
- Coordinates: 51°6′58″N 20°27′43″E
- Country: Poland
- Voivodeship: Świętokrzyskie
- County: Końskie
- Gmina: Końskie
- Population: 140

Małachów [maˈwaxuf] is a village in the administrative district of Gmina Końskie, within Końskie County, Świętokrzyskie Voivodeship, in south-central Poland. It lies approximately 10 km (6 mi) south of Końskie and 29 km (18 mi) north-west of the regional capital Kielce.
