= Szabelnia =

- Village
- Location within Poland
- Coordinates: 51°12′28″N 20°18′17″E
- Country: Poland
- Voivodeship: Świętokrzyskie
- County: Końskie
- Gmina: Końskie

Szabelnia [ʂaˈbɛlɲa] is a village in the administrative district of Gmina Końskie, within Końskie County, Świętokrzyskie Voivodeship, in south-central Poland. It lies approximately 8 km (5 mi) west of Końskie and 43 km (27 mi) north-west of the regional capital Kielce.
