= Nowy Kazanów =

- Village
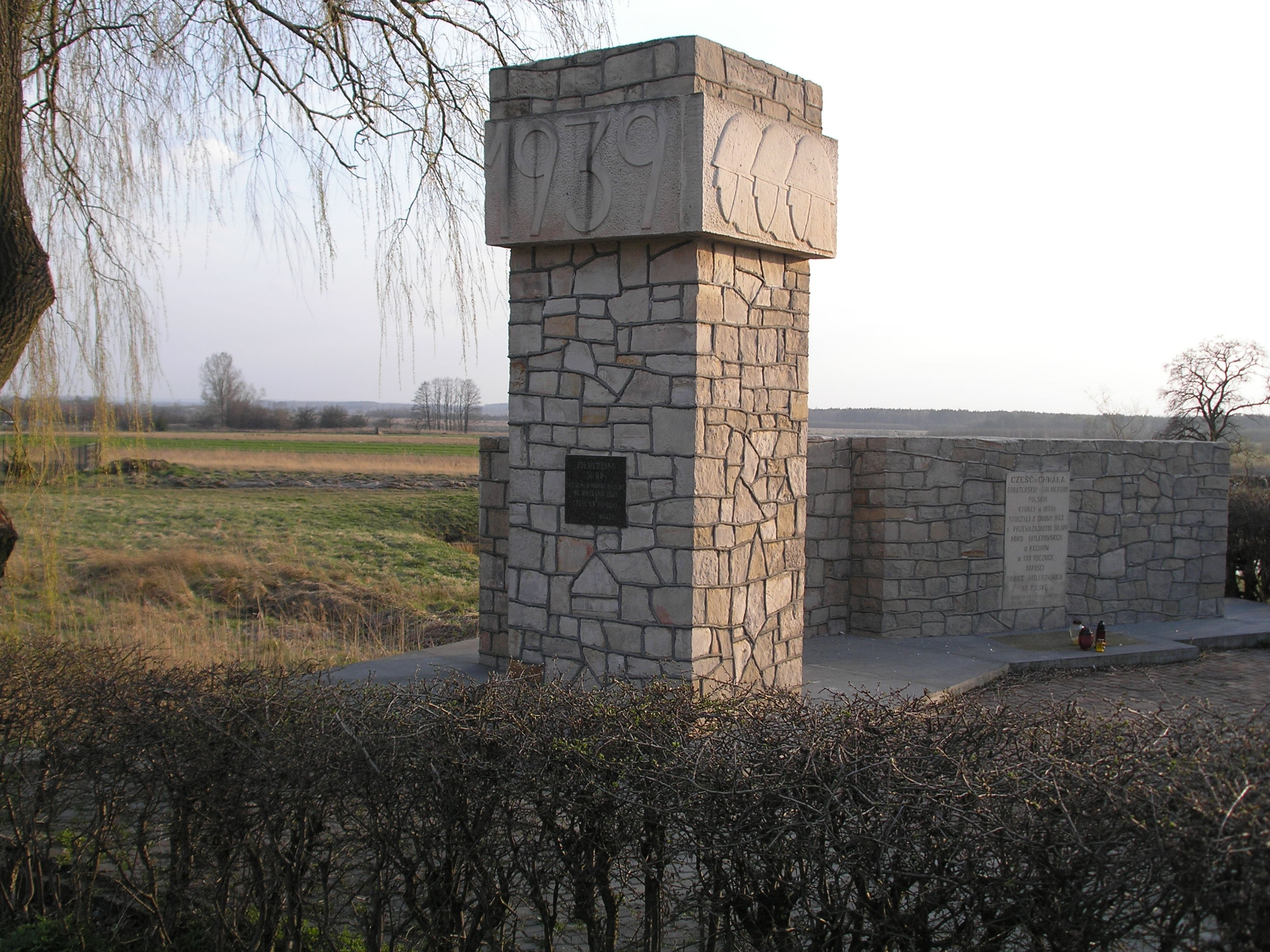

- Location within Poland
- Coordinates: 51°10′58″N 20°20′56″E
- Country: Poland
- Voivodeship: Świętokrzyskie
- County: Końskie
- Gmina: Końskie
- Population: 460

Nowy Kazanów [ˈnɔvɨ kaˈzanuf] is a village in the administrative district of Gmina Końskie, within Końskie County, Świętokrzyskie Voivodeship, in south-central Poland. It lies approximately 6 km (4 mi) west of Końskie and 39 km (24 mi) north-west of the regional capital Kielce.
