= Wąsosz, Gmina Końskie =

Wąsosz
- Village
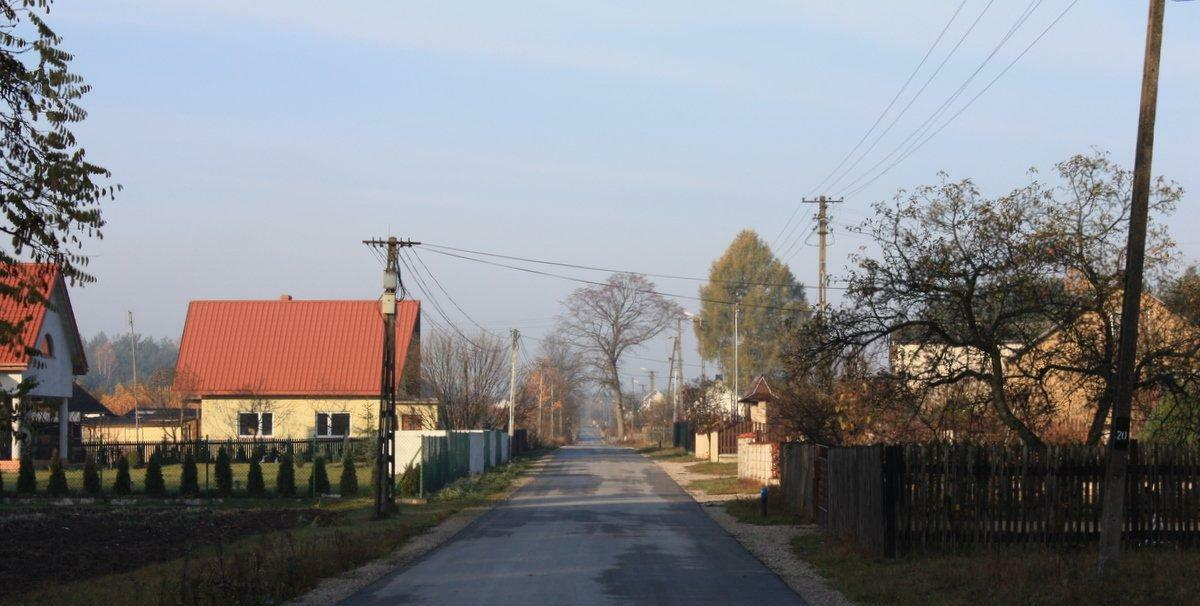

- Location within Poland
- Coordinates: 51°8′13″N 20°27′49″E
- Country: Poland
- Voivodeship: Świętokrzyskie
- County: Końskie
- Gmina: Końskie

Population
  - Total: 470
- Postal code: 26-220

Wąsosz [ˈvɔ̃sɔʂ] is a village in the administrative district of Gmina Końskie, within Końskie County, Świętokrzyskie Voivodeship, in south-central Poland. It lies approximately 8 km (5 mi) south-east of Końskie and 31 km (19 mi) north of the regional capital Kielce.
