= Stary Kazanów =

- Village
- Location within Poland
- Coordinates: 51°10′15″N 20°20′35″E
- Country: Poland
- Voivodeship: Świętokrzyskie
- County: Końskie
- Gmina: Końskie
- Population: 410

Stary Kazanów [ˈstarɨ kaˈzanuf] is a village in the administrative district of Gmina Końskie, within Końskie County, Świętokrzyskie Voivodeship, in south-central Poland. It lies approximately 7 km (4 mi) south-west of Końskie and 38 km (24 mi) north-west of the regional capital Kielce.
