= Niebo, Świętokrzyskie Voivodeship =

Niebo
- Village
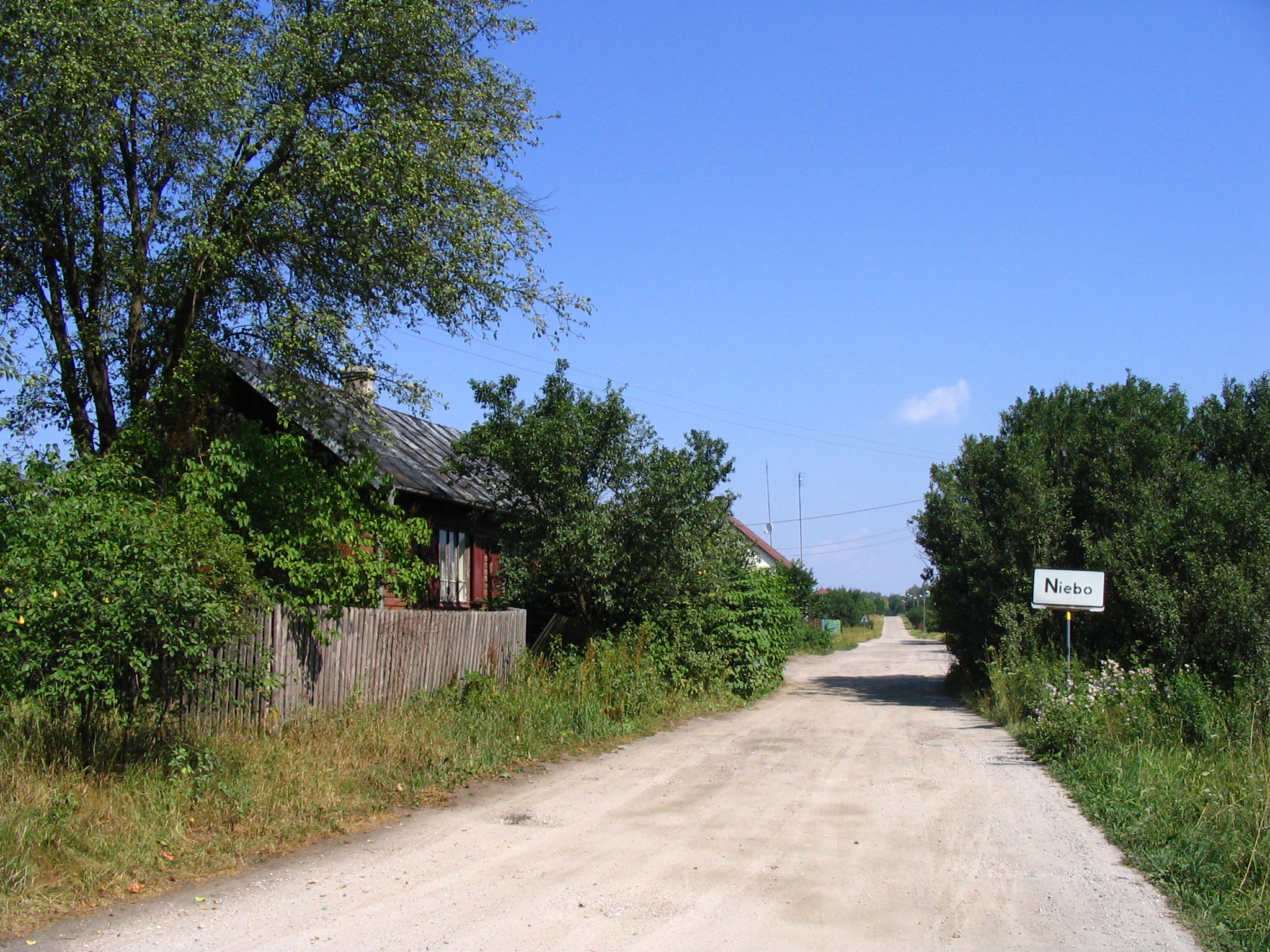

- Location within Poland
- Coordinates: 51°8′39″N 20°24′43″E
- Country: Poland
- Voivodeship: Świętokrzyskie
- County: Końskie
- Gmina: Końskie
- Population: 90

Niebo [ˈɲɛbɔ] is a village in the administrative district of Gmina Końskie, within Końskie County, Świętokrzyskie Voivodeship, in south-central Poland. It lies approximately 7 km (4 mi) south of Końskie and 33 km (21 mi) north-west of the regional capital Kielce.
