= Grabków, Końskie County =

Grabków
- Village
- Location within Poland
- Coordinates: 51°13′20″N 20°15′48″E
- Country: Poland
- Voivodeship: Świętokrzyskie
- County: Końskie
- Gmina: Końskie

Grabków [ˈɡrapkuf] is a village in the administrative district of Gmina Końskie, within Końskie County, Świętokrzyskie Voivodeship, in south-central Poland. It lies approximately 11 km (7 mi) west of Końskie and 45 km (28 mi) north-west of the regional capital Kielce.
