= Nowy Dziebałtów =

- Village
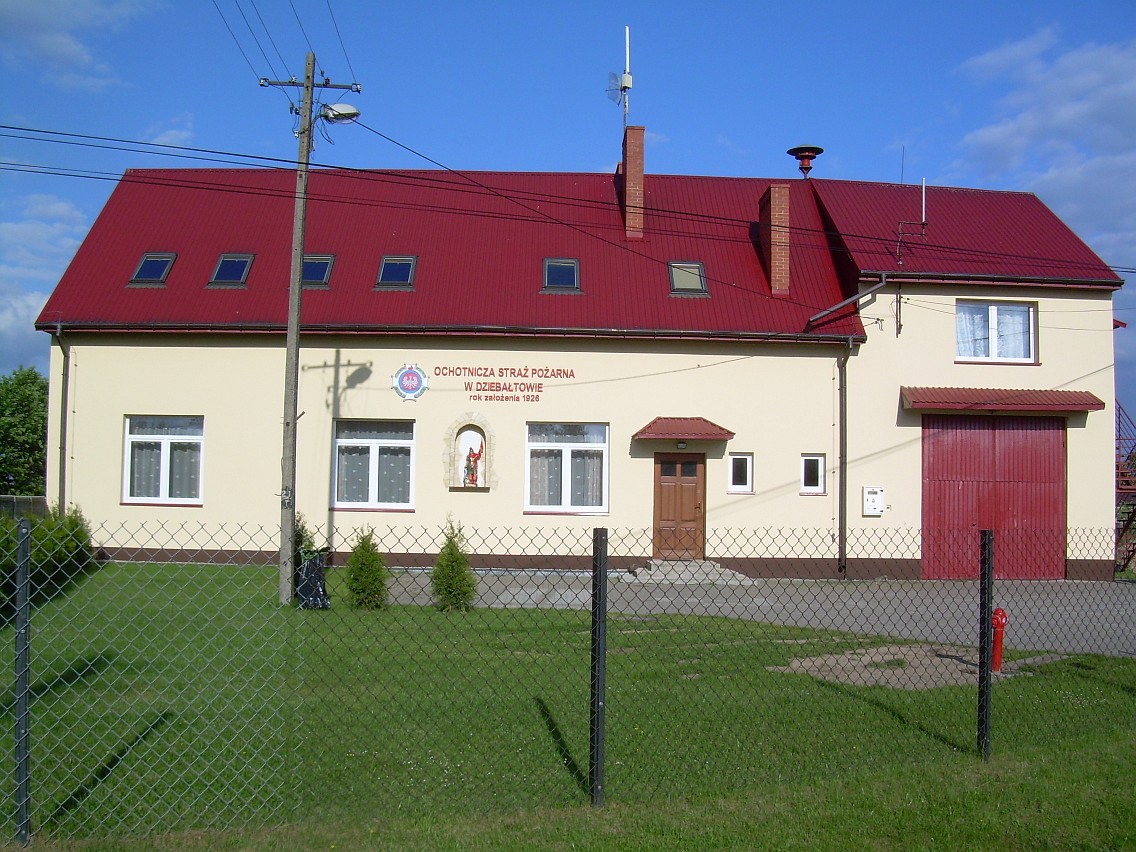
- Volunteer Fire Station (OSP) in Nowy Dziebałtów

- Location within Poland
- Coordinates: 51°8′35″N 20°19′33″E
- Country: Poland
- Voivodeship: Świętokrzyskie
- County: Końskie
- Gmina: Końskie
- Population: 550

Nowy Dziebałtów [ˈnɔvɨ d͡ʑɛˈbau̯tuf] is a village in the administrative district of Gmina Końskie, within Końskie County, Świętokrzyskie Voivodeship, in south-central Poland. It lies approximately 9 km (6 mi) south-west of Końskie and 36 km (22 mi) north-west of the regional capital Kielce.
