= Młynek Nieświński =

- Village
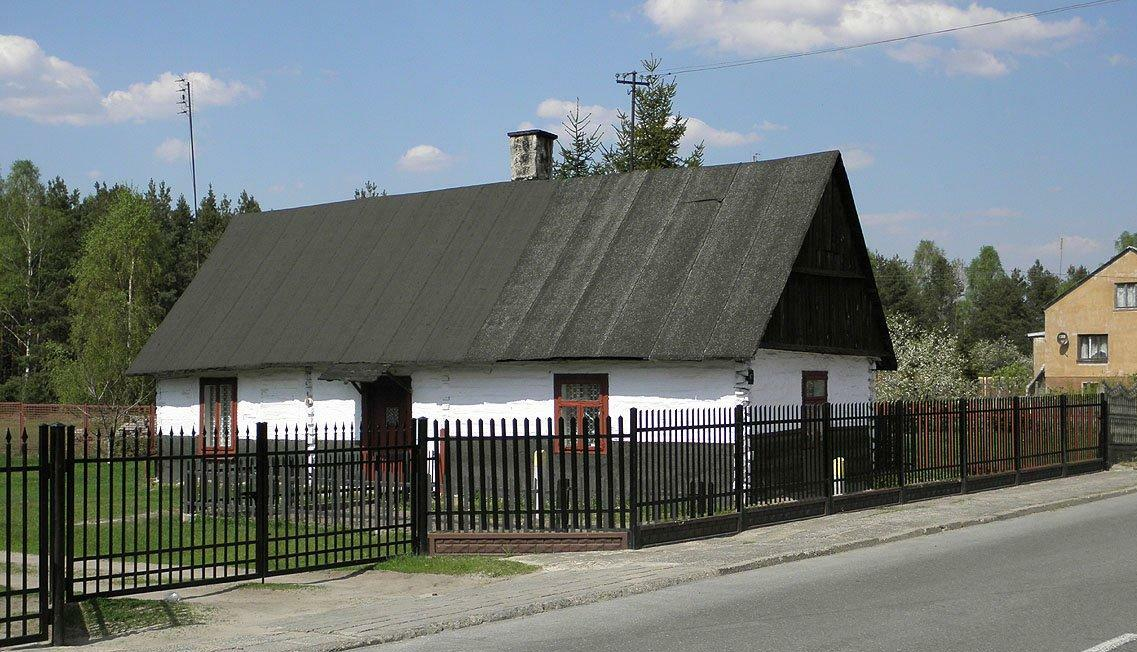

- Location within Poland
- Coordinates: 51°12′53″N 20°26′59″E
- Country: Poland
- Voivodeship: Świętokrzyskie
- County: Końskie
- Gmina: Końskie
- Population: 370

Młynek Nieświński [ˈmwɨnɛk ɲɛɕˈfiɲski] is a village in the administrative district of Gmina Końskie, within Końskie County, Świętokrzyskie Voivodeship, in south-central Poland. It lies approximately 3 km (2 mi) north-east of Końskie and 39 km (24 mi) north of the regional capital Kielce.
