= Stara Kuźnica, Świętokrzyskie Voivodeship =

Stara Kuźnica
- Village
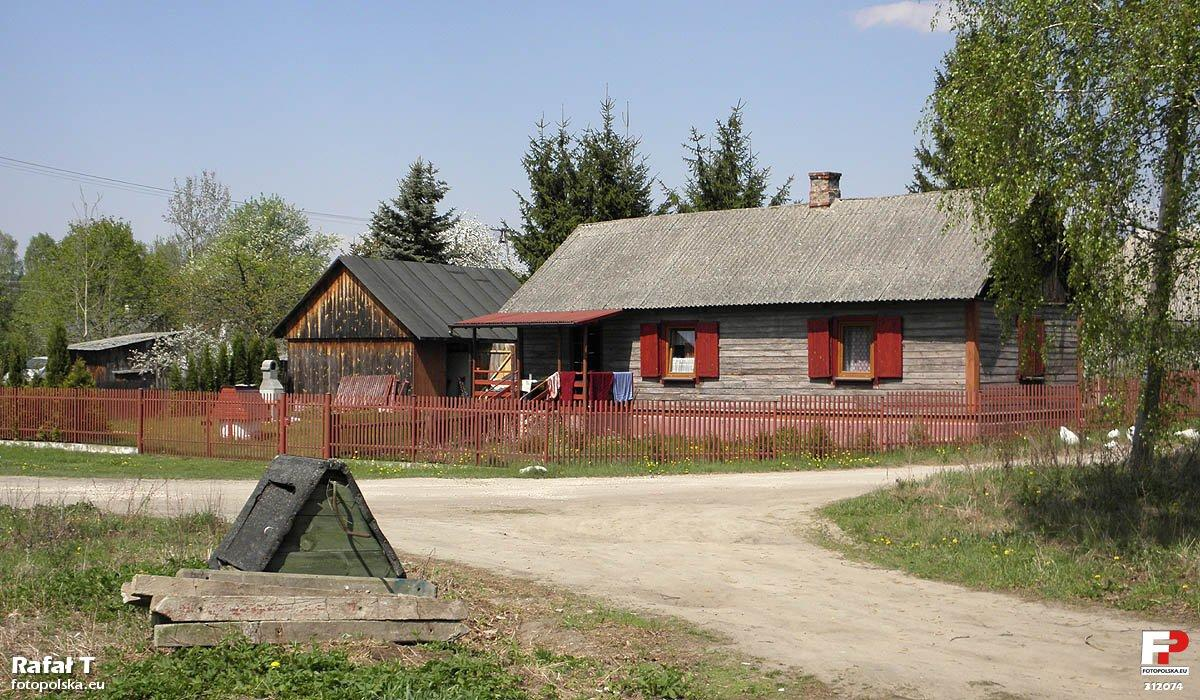

- Location within Poland
- Coordinates: 51°12′49″N 20°30′14″E
- Country: Poland
- Voivodeship: Świętokrzyskie
- County: Końskie
- Gmina: Końskie
- Population: 140

Stara Kuźnica (Polish pronunciation: [ˈstara kuʑˈɲit͡sa]) is a village in the administrative district of Gmina Końskie, within Końskie County, Świętokrzyskie Voivodeship, in south-central Poland. It lies approximately 7 km (4 mi) east of Końskie and 38 km (24 mi) north of the regional capital Kielce.
