= Jeżów, Końskie County =

Jeżów
- Village
- Location within Poland
- Coordinates: 51°14′30″N 20°20′45″E
- Country: Poland
- Voivodeship: Świętokrzyskie
- County: Końskie
- Gmina: Końskie
- Population: 210

Jeżów [ˈjɛʐuf] is a village in the administrative district of Gmina Końskie, within Końskie County, Świętokrzyskie Voivodeship, in south-central Poland. It lies approximately 7 km (4 mi) north-west of Końskie and 45 km (28 mi) north-west of the regional capital, Kielce.
