= Przybyszowy =

- Village
- Location within Poland
- Coordinates: 51°11′30″N 20°16′39″E
- Country: Poland
- Voivodeship: Świętokrzyskie
- County: Końskie
- Gmina: Końskie
- Population: 180

Przybyszowy [pʂɨbɨˈʂɔvɨ] is a village in the administrative district of Gmina Końskie, within Końskie County, Świętokrzyskie Voivodeship, in south-central Poland. It lies approximately 10 km (6 mi) west of Końskie and 42 km (26 mi) north-west of the regional capital Kielce.
