= Piekło, Świętokrzyskie Voivodeship =

Piekło
- Village
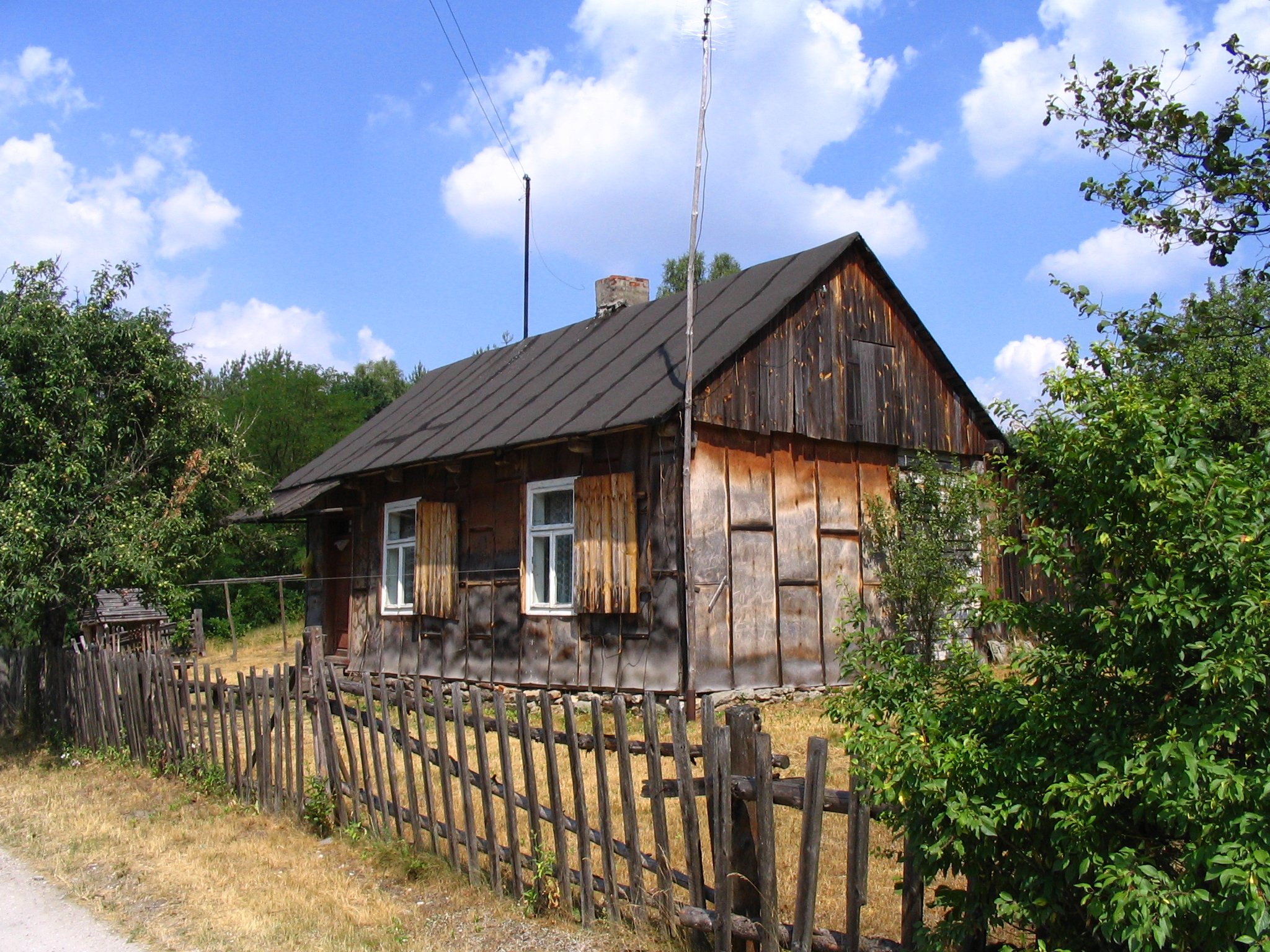

- Location within Poland
- Coordinates: 51°7′39″N 20°24′44″E
- Country: Poland
- Voivodeship: Świętokrzyskie
- County: Końskie
- Gmina: Końskie
- Population: 2 (2,009)

Piekło [ˈpjɛkwɔ] is a village in the administrative district of Gmina Końskie, within Końskie County, Świętokrzyskie Voivodeship, in south-central Poland. It lies approximately 9 km (6 mi) south of Końskie and 31 km (19 mi) north-west of the regional capital Kielce.
