= Proćwin =

- Village
- Location within Poland
- Coordinates: 51°13′1″N 20°23′2″E
- Country: Poland
- Voivodeship: Świętokrzyskie
- County: Końskie
- Gmina: Końskie
- Population: 360

Proćwin [ˈprɔt͡ɕfin] is a village in the administrative district of Gmina Końskie, within Końskie County, Świętokrzyskie Voivodeship, in south-central Poland. It lies approximately 3 km (2 mi) north-west of Końskie and 41 km (25 mi) north-west of the regional capital Kielce.
