= Radomek, Świętokrzyskie Voivodeship =

Radomek
- Village
- Location within Poland
- Coordinates: 51°14′15″N 20°17′30″E
- Country: Poland
- Voivodeship: Świętokrzyskie
- County: Końskie
- Gmina: Końskie
- Population: 80

Radomek [raˈdɔmɛk] is a village in the administrative district of Gmina Końskie, within Końskie County, Świętokrzyskie Voivodeship, in south-central Poland. It lies approximately 10 km (6 mi) north-west of Końskie and 46 km (29 mi) north-west of the regional capital Kielce.
