= Sierosławice, Świętokrzyskie Voivodeship =

Sierosławice
- Village
- Location within Poland
- Coordinates: 51°11′42″N 20°21′21″E
- Country: Poland
- Voivodeship: Świętokrzyskie
- County: Końskie
- Gmina: Końskie
- Population: 650

Sierosławice [ɕɛrɔswaˈvit͡sɛ] is a village in the administrative district of Gmina Końskie, within Końskie County, Świętokrzyskie Voivodeship, in south-central Poland. It lies approximately 5 km (3 mi) west of Końskie and 40 km (25 mi) north-west of the regional capital Kielce.
