= Stadnicka Wola =

- Village
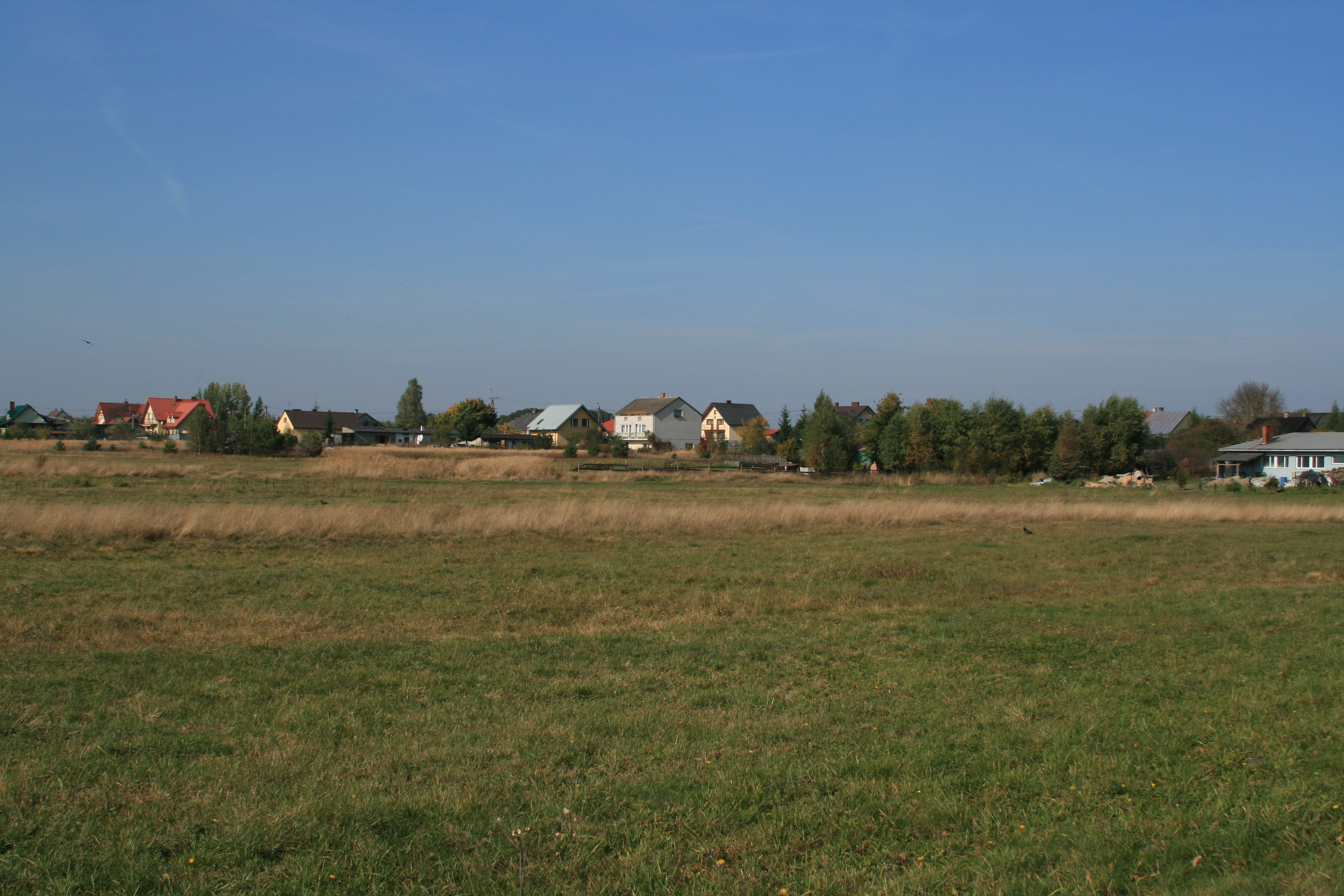

- Location within Poland
- Coordinates: 51°10′26″N 20°25′15″E
- Country: Poland
- Voivodeship: Świętokrzyskie
- County: Końskie
- Gmina: Końskie
- Time zone: UTC+1 (CET)
  - Summer (DST): UTC+2 (CEST)
- Vehicle registration: TKN

Stadnicka Wola [stadˈnit͡ska ˈvɔla] is a village in the administrative district of Gmina Końskie, within Końskie County, Świętokrzyskie Voivodeship, in south-central Poland. It lies approximately 3 km (2 mi) south of Końskie and 36 km (22 mi) north-west of the regional capital Kielce.

During the German occupation of Poland (World War II), the Germans carried out a massacre of 27 Poles in the forest of Stadnicka Wola on April 8, 1940 (see also Nazi crimes against the Polish nation).

== Notable people ==
- Jadwiga Janus (1931–2019), Polish sculptor
