= Bedlno, Świętokrzyskie Voivodeship =

Bedlno
- Village
- Location within Poland
- Coordinates: 51°12′15″N 20°16′12″E
- Country: Poland
- Voivodeship: Świętokrzyskie
- County: Końskie
- Gmina: Końskie
- Population: 340

Bedlno [ˈbɛdlnɔ] is a village in the administrative district of Gmina Końskie, within Końskie County, Świętokrzyskie Voivodeship, in south-central Poland. It lies approximately 11 km (7 mi) west of Końskie and 44 km (27 mi) north-west of the regional capital Kielce.
