= Bedlno =

Bedlno may refer to the following places:

- Bedlno, Łódź Voivodeship (central Poland)
- Bedlno, Lublin Voivodeship (east Poland)
- Bedlno, Świętokrzyskie Voivodeship (south-central Poland)
- Bedlno, West Pomeranian Voivodeship (north-west Poland)
