= Baczyna =

Baczyna refers to the following places in Poland:

- Baczyna, Lubusz Voivodeship
- Baczyna, Świętokrzyskie Voivodeship
