= Kopaniny =

Kopaniny may refer to the following places:

- Kopaniny, Gmina Lututów in Łódź Voivodeship (central Poland)
- Kopaniny, Gmina Sokolniki in Łódź Voivodeship (central Poland)
- Kopaniny, Lublin Voivodeship (east Poland)
- Kopaniny, Świętokrzyskie Voivodeship (south-central Poland)
- Kopaniny, Masovian Voivodeship (east-central Poland)
- Kopaniny, Częstochowa County in Silesian Voivodeship (south Poland)
- Kopaniny, Zawiercie County in Silesian Voivodeship (south Poland)
- Kopaniny, West Pomeranian Voivodeship (north-west Poland)
