= Kopaniny, Świętokrzyskie Voivodeship =

Kopaniny
- Village
- Location within Poland
- Coordinates: 51°12′48″N 20°16′57″E
- Country: Poland
- Voivodeship: Świętokrzyskie
- County: Końskie
- Gmina: Końskie

Kopaniny [kɔpaˈninɨ] is a village in the administrative district of Gmina Końskie, within Końskie County, Świętokrzyskie Voivodeship, in south-central Poland. It lies approximately 10 km (6 mi) west of Końskie and 44 km (27 mi) north-west of the regional capital Kielce.
