= Dyszów =

- Village
- Location within Poland
- Coordinates: 51°12′38″N 20°25′18″E
- Country: Poland
- Voivodeship: Świętokrzyskie
- County: Końskie
- Gmina: Końskie

Dyszów [ˈdɨʂuf] is a village in the administrative district of Gmina Końskie, within Końskie County, Świętokrzyskie Voivodeship, in south-central Poland.
