= Czysta, Świętokrzyskie Voivodeship =

Village in Gmina Końskie, Poland

Czysta
- Village
- Location within Poland
- Coordinates: 51°12′51″N 20°28′02″E
- Country: Poland
- Voivodeship: Świętokrzyskie
- County: Końskie
- Gmina: Końskie

Czysta [ˈt͡ʂɨsta] is a village in the administrative district of Gmina Końskie, within Końskie County, Świętokrzyskie Voivodeship, in south-central Poland.
