= Barycz =

Barycz may also refer to:

- Barycz (river), in western Poland
- Barycz, part of the Swoszowice district of Kraków
- Barycz, Pabianice County in Łódź Voivodeship (central Poland)
- Barycz, Radomsko County in Łódź Voivodeship (central Poland)
- Barycz, Lower Silesian Voivodeship (south-west Poland)
- Barycz, Brzozów County in Subcarpathian Voivodeship (south-east Poland)
- Barycz, Przemyśl County in Subcarpathian Voivodeship (south-east Poland)
- Barycz, Świętokrzyskie Voivodeship (south-central Poland)
