= Barycz, Świętokrzyskie Voivodeship =

Barycz
- Village
- Location within Poland
- Coordinates: 51°13′25″N 20°25′6″E
- Country: Poland
- Voivodeship: Świętokrzyskie
- County: Końskie
- Gmina: Końskie
- Population: 430

Barycz [ˈbarɨt͡ʂ] is a village in the administrative district of Gmina Końskie, within Końskie County, Świętokrzyskie Voivodeship, in south-central Poland. It lies approximately 3 km (2 mi) north of Końskie and 41 km (25 mi) north of the regional capital Kielce.
