= Stary Sokołów =

- Village
- Location within Poland
- Coordinates: 51°8′28″N 20°18′19″E
- Country: Poland
- Voivodeship: Świętokrzyskie
- County: Końskie
- Gmina: Końskie
- Population: 350

Stary Sokołów [ˈstarɨ sɔˈkɔwuf] is a village in the administrative district of Gmina Końskie, within Końskie County, Świętokrzyskie Voivodeship, in south-central Poland. It lies approximately 11 km (7 mi) south-west of Końskie and 36 km (22 mi) north-west of the regional capital Kielce.
