= Nowe Sierosławice =

Village in Gmina Końskie, Poland

- Village
- Location within Poland
- Coordinates: 51°11′26″N 20°21′12″E
- Country: Poland
- Voivodeship: Świętokrzyskie
- County: Końskie
- Gmina: Końskie

Nowe Sierosławice [ˈnɔvɛ ɕɛrɔswaˈvit͡sɛ] is a village in the administrative district of Gmina Końskie, within Końskie County, Świętokrzyskie Voivodeship, in south-central Poland.
