= Sierosławice =

Sierosławice may refer to the following places:

- Sierosławice, Lesser Poland Voivodeship (south Poland)
- Sierosławice, Lubusz Voivodeship (west Poland)
- Sierosławice, Świętokrzyskie Voivodeship (south-central Poland)
- Sierosławice, Opole Voivodeship (south-west Poland)
