= Gmina Końskie =

Gmina Końskie Końskie Commune
- Gmina
- Coat of arms
- Interactive map of Gmina Końskie
- Coordinates (Końskie): 51°12′N 20°25′E
- Country: Poland
- Voivodeship: Świętokrzyskie
- County: Końskie
- Seat: Końskie

Area
  - Total: 249.9 km^{2} (96.5 sq mi)

Population (2006)
  - Total: 36,373
  - Density: 145.6/km^{2} (377.0/sq mi)
  - Urban: 20,667
  - Rural: 15,706
- Website: http://www.umkonskie.pl

Gmina Końskie is an urban-rural gmina (administrative district) in Końskie County, Świętokrzyskie Voivodeship, in central Poland. Its seat is the town of Końskie, which lies approximately 38 kilometres (24 mi) north of the regional capital Kielce.

The gmina covers an area of 249.9 square kilometres (96.5 sq mi), and as of 2006 its total population is 36,373 (out of which the population of Końskie amounts to 20,667, and the population of the rural part of the gmina is 15,706).

== Villages ==
Apart from the town of Końskie, Gmina Końskie contains the villages and settlements of Baczyna, Barycz, Bedlenko, Bedlno, Brody, Chełb, Czerwony Most, Czysta, Drutarnia, Dyszów, Fidor, Gabrielnia, Gatniki, Głupiów, Górny Młyn, Grabków, Gracuch, Izabelów, Jeżów, Koczwara, Kopaniny, Kornica, Małachów, Młynek Nieświński, Modliszewice, Nałęczów, Niebo, Nieświń, Nowe Sierosławice, Nowy Dziebałtów, Nowy Kazanów, Nowy Sokołów, Paruchy, Piekło, Piła, Pomorzany, Pomyków, Poraj, Proćwin, Przybyszowy, Radomek, Rogów, Sielpia Wielka, Sierosławice, Stadnicka Wola, Stara Kuźnica, Stary Dziebałtów, Stary Kazanów, Stary Sokołów, Sworzyce, Szabelnia, Trzemoszna, Wąsosz and Wincentów.

== Neighbouring gminas ==
Gmina Końskie is bordered by the gminas of Białaczów, Gowarczów, Przysucha, Radoszyce, Ruda Maleniecka, Smyków, Stąporków and Żarnów.
