= Brody, Końskie County =

Brody
- Village
- Location within Poland
- Coordinates: 51°9′47″N 20°22′22″E
- Country: Poland
- Voivodeship: Świętokrzyskie
- County: Końskie
- Gmina: Końskie

Brody [ˈbrɔdɨ] is a village in the administrative district of Gmina Końskie, within Końskie County, Świętokrzyskie Voivodeship, in south-central Poland. It lies approximately 6 km (4 mi) south-west of Końskie and 36 km (22 mi) north-west of the regional capital Kielce.
