= Końskie Synagogue =

Destroyed wooden synagogue in Końskie, Poland

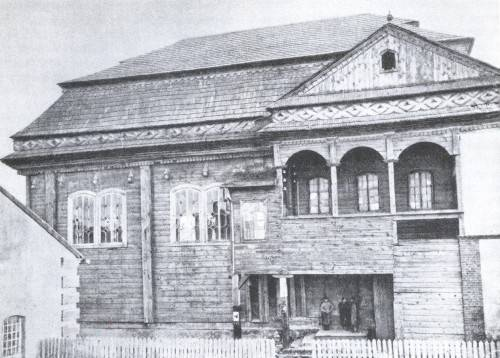
- The former synagogue, c. 1930

- Location of the destroyed synagogue in Świętokrzyskie Voivodeship

Religion
- Affiliation: Orthodox Judaism (former)
- Ecclesiastical or organizational status: Synagogue (1780–1939)
- Status: Destroyed

Location
- Location: Bóżnicza Street, Końskie, Świętokrzyskie Voivodeship
- Country: Poland
- Interactive map of Końskie Synagogue
- Coordinates: 51°11′30″N 20°24′22″E

Architecture
- Type: Synagogue architecture
- Style: Wooden
- Established: 1748 (as a congregation)
- Completed: 1780
- Destroyed: September 1939

Specifications
- Direction of façade: North
- Length: 19 m (62 ft)
- Width: 16 m (52 ft)
- Width (nave): 11 m (36 ft)
- Materials: Timber (larch)

The Końskie Synagogue was a former Orthodox Jewish congregation and synagogue, located on Bóżnicza Street (currently on the corner of Kaznowskiego and Piłsudskiego Streets), in Końskie, in the Świętokrzyskie Voivodeship of Poland. Completed in 1780 in what was then the Polish–Lithuanian Commonwealth, the large wooden synagogue, one of the first large synagogues of its kind built at the invitation of the King of Poland, served as a house of prayer until World War II when it was destroyed by Nazis in September 1939, soon after their conquest of the town.

== Description ==
The main hall was on the west side and a two-story gallery at its corners in the south and north. This was originally open, during the renovations in 1905 it was closed with a wooden panel. Access to the upper floor was via two symmetrical stairs on the sides. Between the gallery and the main hall there was still the vestibule and a smaller room and another room as a (small) prayer room for women. The large women's prayer room was located above this.

The main hall (the men's prayer room) had two twin windows with round arches on the outer walls. The two-tiered mansard hipped roof was divided by a small step and was closed at the bottom by a frieze. The extensions of the gallery at the corners had their own little gable roofs.

The men's prayer room was almost square with 11.9 m × 12.1 m (39 ft × 40 ft); the wall height was 7.6 m (25 ft) and the height to the top of the dome was 13.8 m (45 ft). An octagonal dome had been built into the roof in two steps; at the bottom it was divided into eight trapezoidal elements and at the top into triangles. The bima under the dome had an arbor shape (also octagonal).

An older Torah shrine was replaced by a new one (probably in the 19th century). This was in the shape of a narrow cupboard with double doors and small pillars. Above it was a double-headed eagle with a crown, which probably came from the original Torah shrine.

== See also ==
- History of the Jews in Poland
- List of active synagogues in Poland
- List of wooden synagogues
