= Jadwiga Janus =

Polish sculptor (1931–2019)

- Born: 21 October 1931; Stadnicka Wola, Poland
- Died: 9 March 2019 (aged 87)
- Education: Jan Matejko Academy of Fine Arts
- Known for: Sculpture
- Awards: Medal Zasłużony Kulturze Gloria Artis

Jadwiga Janus (21 October 1931 – 9 March 2019) was a Polish sculptor.

== Biography ==
Janus was born in Stadnicka Wola, Poland. In 1957, she graduated from the Jan Matejko Academy of Fine Arts in Kraków, under professor Xawery Dunikowski.

=== Monuments ===
- Monument Pogromcom hitleryzmu in Wieluń, (1966)
- Monument Władysław Żarski in Piotrków Trybunalski, (1969)
- Monument Martyrologii Dzieci in Łódź, (1971)
- Monument Nicolaus Copernicus in Łódź, (2002)

=== In collections ===
- National Museum, Warsaw.
- Polish Sculpture Center.
- Museum in Łódź.
- Museum Sztuki Medalierskiej in Wrocław.
- Museum Leon Wyczółkowski in Bydgoszcz.
- Wielkopolskie Muzeum Walk Niepodległościowych.

== Film (documentary) ==
- 2005: Inspirations ("Inspiracje") -- as herself

=== Prizes ===
- 1968: Monument Martyrologii Dzieci Łódź.- I Prize.
- 1973: Monument Czynu Rewolucyjnego in Łódź. -I Prize.
- 1975 monument Bohaterów Walk o Wał Pomorski -Prize

== Gallery ==
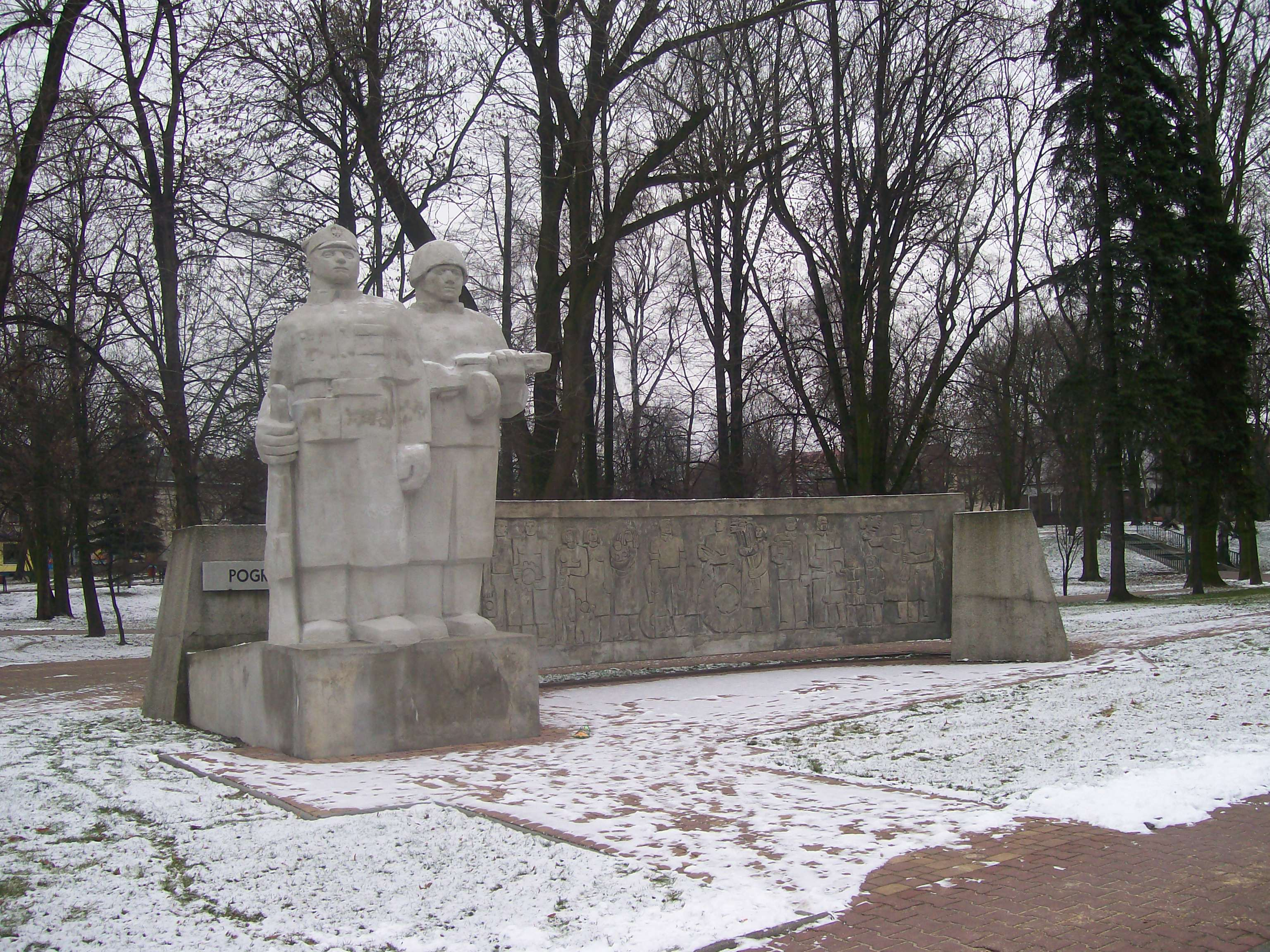
Monument Pogromcom hitleryzmu, 1966, exhibition in Wieluń, Poland

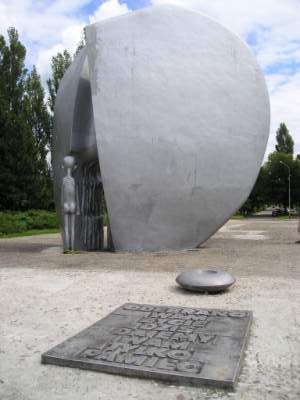
Monument Martyrologii Dzieci, 1971, exhibition in Łódź, Poland

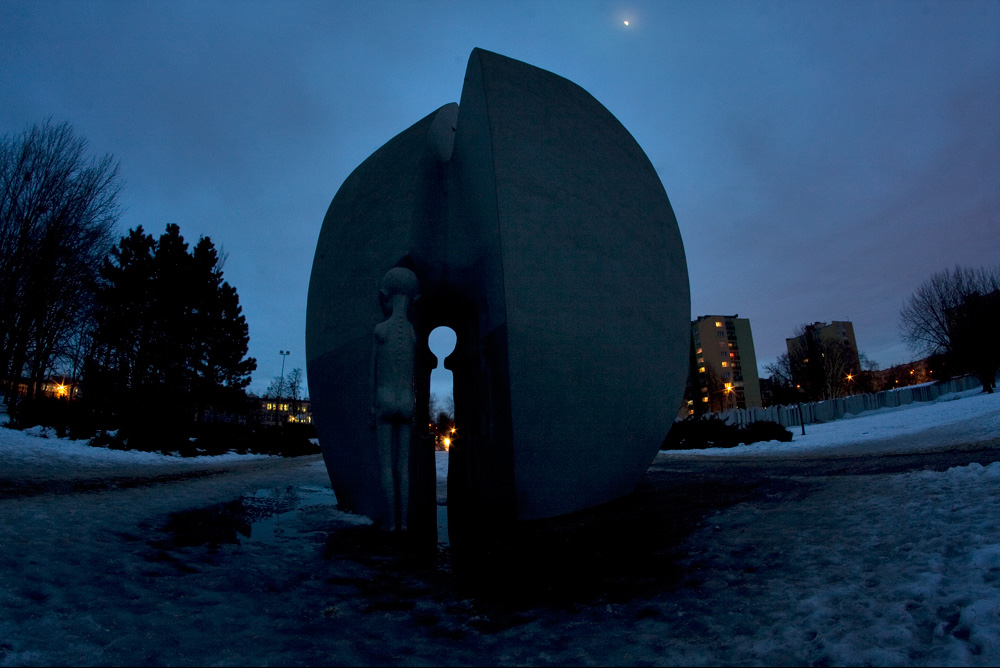
Pęknięte Serce, 1971, exhibition in Łódź, Poland

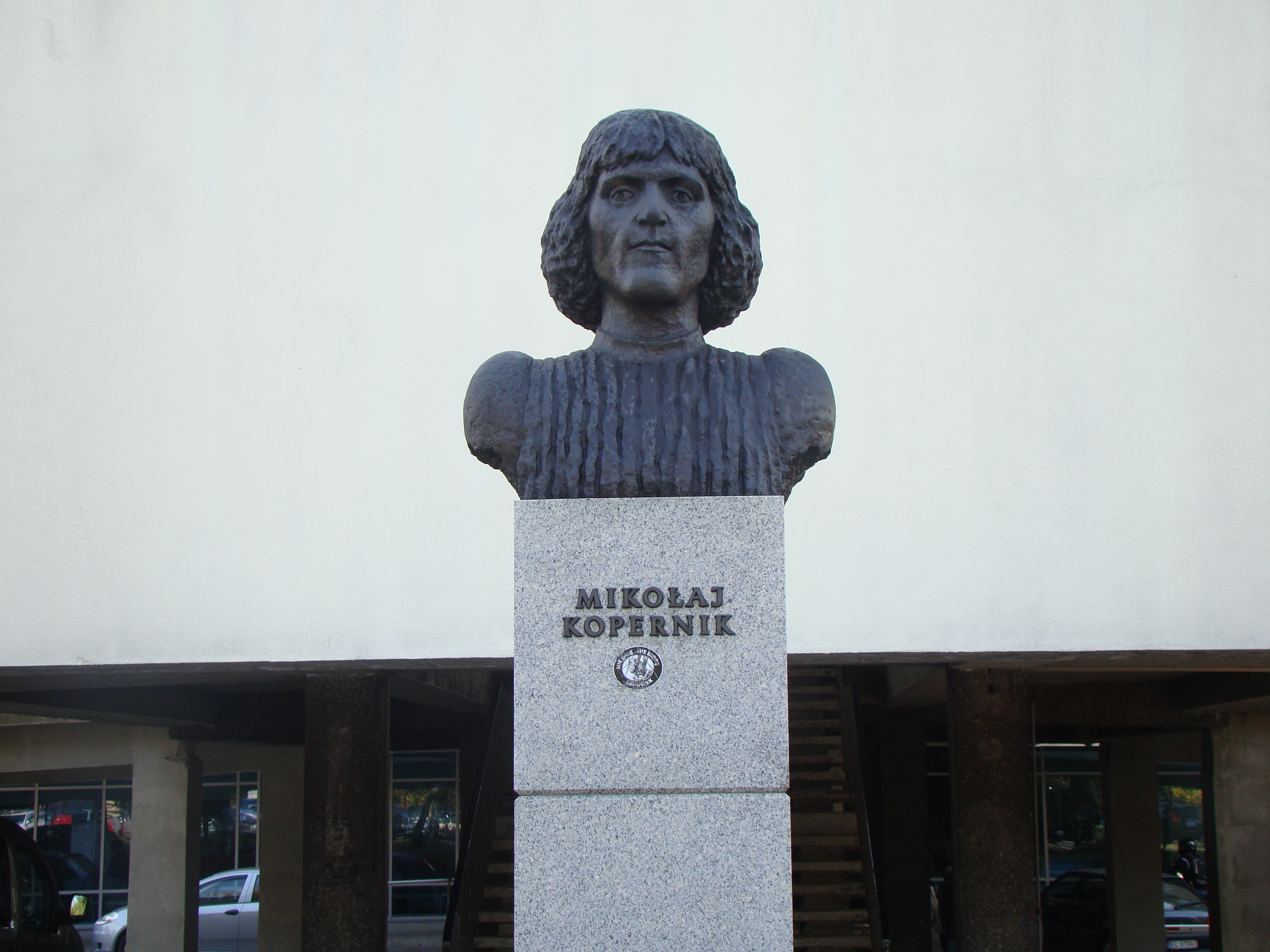
Monument Nicolaus Copernicus, (bronze), 2002, exhibition in Łódź, Poland
