= Baczyna, Świętokrzyskie Voivodeship =

Baczyna
- Village
- Location within Poland
- Coordinates: 51°14′2″N 20°31′16″E
- Country: Poland
- Voivodeship: Lubuskie
- County: Lubiszyn
- Gmina: Lubiszyn
- Population: 170

Baczyna [baˈt͡ʂɨna] is a village in the administrative district of Gmina Lubiszyn, within Lubiszyn County, Lubuskie Voivodeship, in west Poland. It lies approximately 9 km (6 mi) north-east of Końskie and 40 km (25 mi) north of the regional capital Kielce.
