= Końskie =

Town in Poland

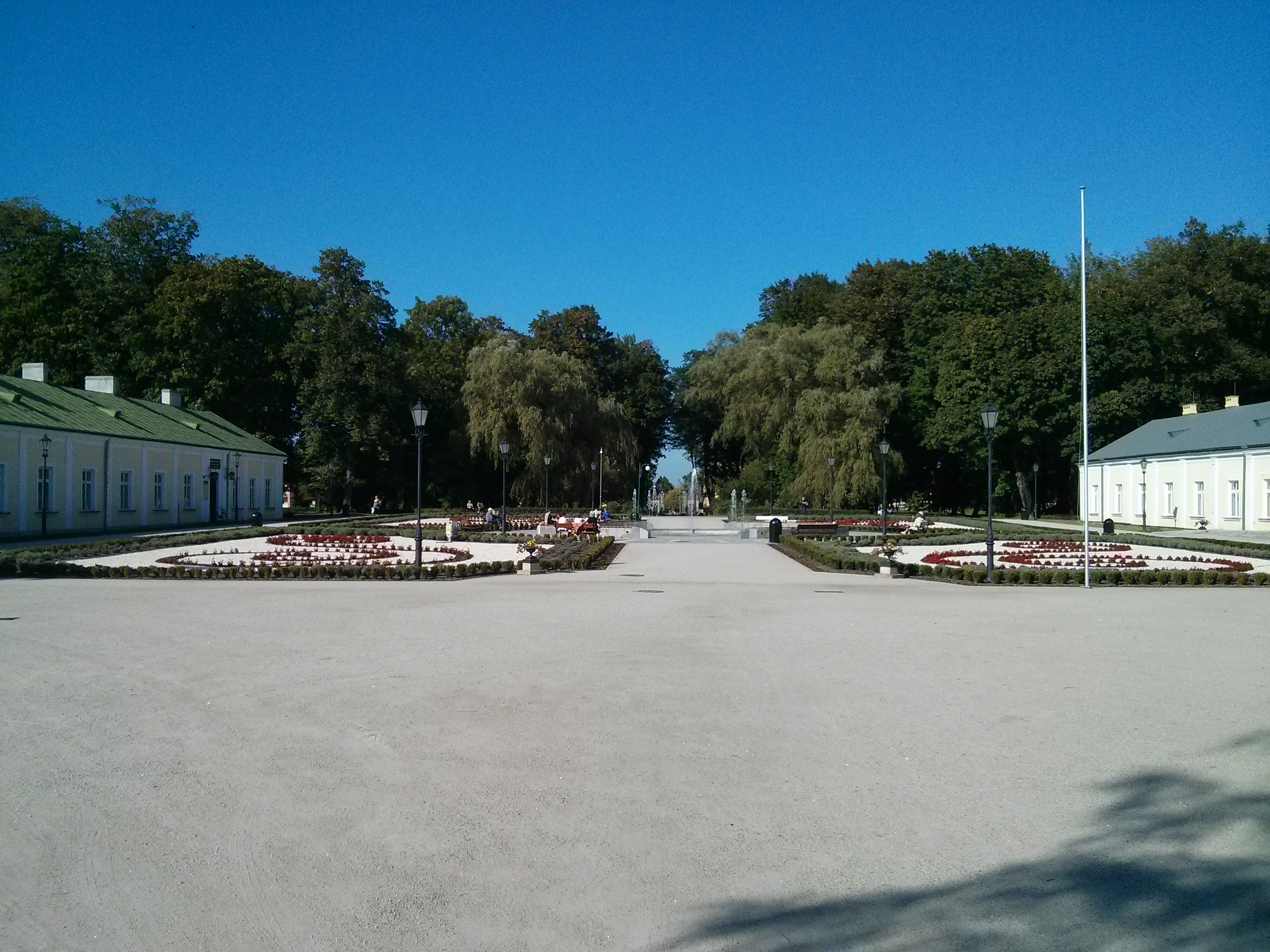
- Palace and park ensemble in Końskie

- Coat of arms

- Location within Poland
- Coordinates: 51°12′N 20°25′E
- Country: Poland
- Voivodeship: Świętokrzyskie
- County: Końskie
- Gmina: Końskie
- Established: 11th century
- Town rights: 1748

Government
  - Mayor: Krzysztof Obratański

Area
  - Total: 35.70 km^{2} (13.78 sq mi)

Population (2013)
  - Total: 19,962
  - Density: 559.2/km^{2} (1,448/sq mi)
- Time zone: UTC+1 (CET)
  - Summer (DST): UTC+2 (CEST)
- Postal code: 26-200 to 26-204
- Area code: +48 41
- Car plates: TKN
- Website: umkonskie.pl

Końskie [ˈkɔɲskʲɛ] (Yiddish: Kinsk, קינצק / קינסק) is a town in south-central Poland, with 20,328 inhabitants (2008), situated in the Świętokrzyskie Voivodeship, in the historic region of Lesser Poland.

== History ==
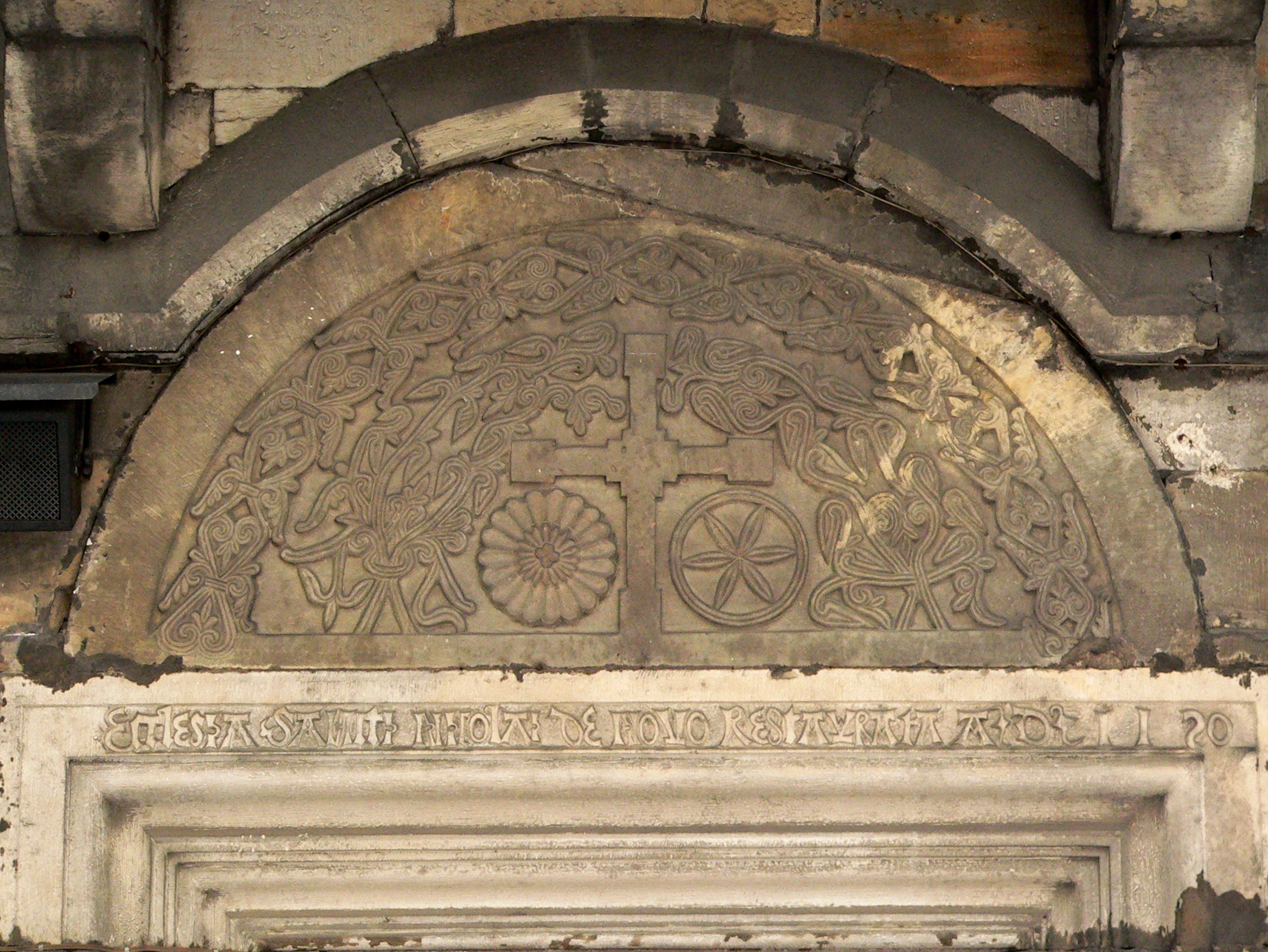
Romanesque tympanum above the south side door of the Gothic St. Nicholas & St. Adalbert parish church

The oldest settlement which is now Końskie dates back to the 11th century. The burial ground from this period was discovered in the north part of the town in 1925. Końskie was mentioned in historical sources in 1124 for the first time, with Prandota of Prandocin (the progenitor of Odrowąż family) recorded as the owner of the settlement. For the next few centuries, the settlement was owned by the Odrowąż family. Iwo Odrowąż, the bishop of Kraków, founded a parish and built a church dedicated to St. Nicholas in 1220–1224. The church was torn down in the 15th century and a new Gothic one was built in its place in the years 1492–1520. Some elements of the older Romanesque church were saved in the new one (e.g. the Romanesque tympanum, pictured).

In the early modern period, a trade route connecting Warsaw and Kraków ran through Końskie. It was one of the busiest routes in Poland. Końskie received city rights from King Augustus III of Poland on December 30, 1748. It was a private town, administratively located in the Żarnów County in the Sandomierz Voivodeship in the Lesser Poland Province. The Polish 14th Cuirassier Regiment was formed in Końskie by Stanisław Małachowski in 1809.

=== World War II ===
During the joint German-Soviet invasion of Poland, which started World War II in 1939, the town was invaded and then occupied by Germany, and the Einsatzgruppe I entered to commit various crimes against the population. Końskie was briefly visited by Adolf Hitler on September 10, 1939, while on the way to Kielce after landing on an airfield nearby. His car cavalcade visited the headquarters of General Walther von Reichenau at the local mansion. Hitler was followed by director Leni Riefenstahl who came a day later, ordered to film the Nazi German victory over Poland.

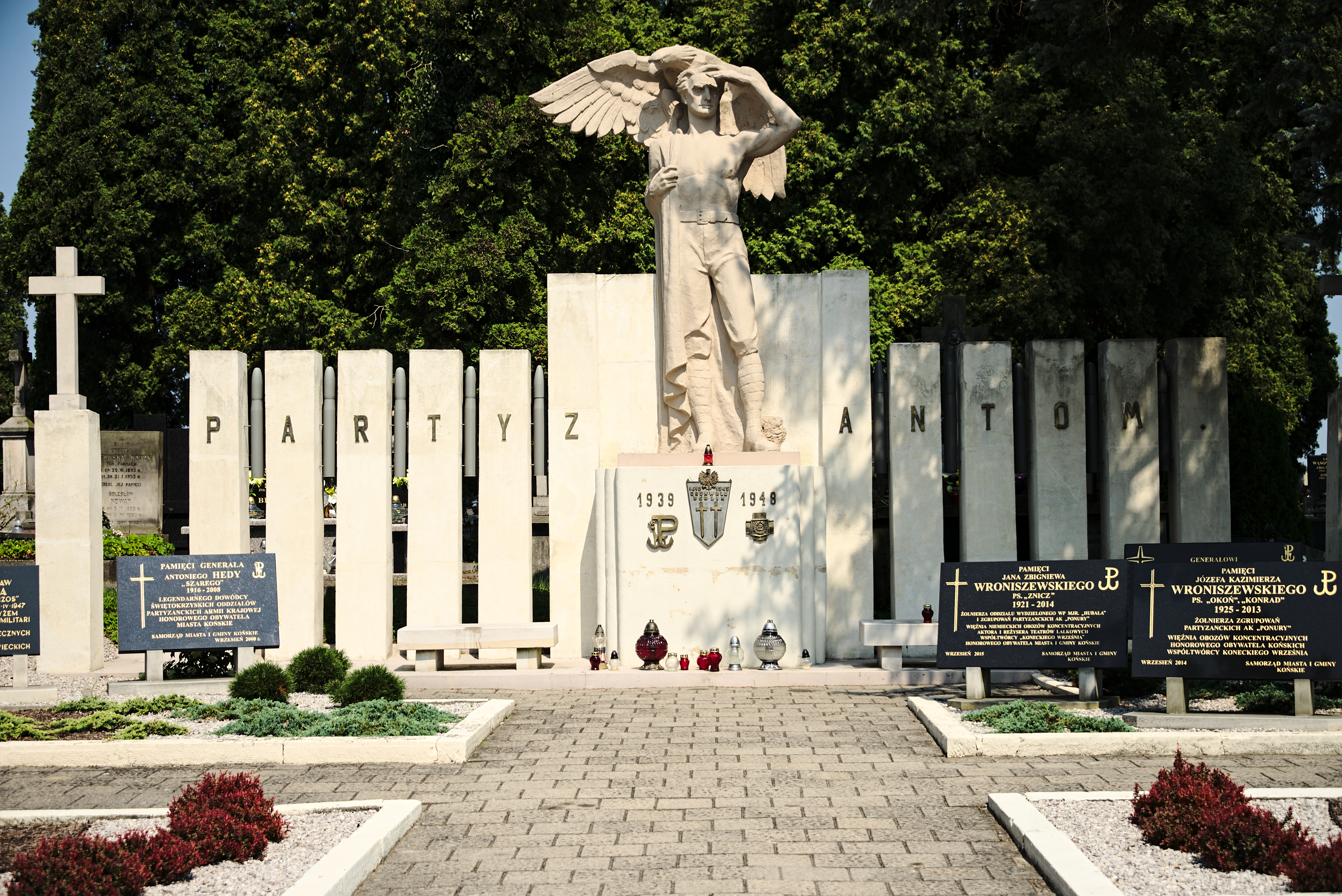
Memorial to local Polish partisans

On September 11, 1939, the Germans carried out mass arrests of around 5,000 men over the age of 18 in the town and its vicinity after finding the bodies of several German policemen and soldiers (including general Wilhelm Fritz von Roettig, first German general to be killed in the conflict) reportedly mutilated by the Poles. The next day two dozen local Jews were summoned to dig graves for the German dead, and shortly afterwards, most of the Jews were shot by the Germans (Końskie massacre). Reportedly, this event was witnessed by Riefenstahl who fainted when witnessing the random killing of on September 12, 1939.

Polish inhabitants of Końskie were also among Poles massacred by the Germans in the nearby village of Stadnicka Wola in April 1940. In 1941–1943, the German administration operated a prisoner-of-war camp for Soviet and Norwegian POWs in the town. About 26,000 POWs passed through the camp, 23,000 of whom either were murdered or died of starvation or epidemics. The Polish resistance movement organized escapes for the camp inmates.

Końskie was the centre of Polish underground resistance during World War II, with battles fought by the Armia Krajowa under Major Henryk Dobrzański ("Hubal") in the nearby forests which the German army feared to enter. The town was taken over by the partisans for a few hours on the night of September 1, 1943, with a number of Gestapo agents assassinated. The Nazi Germans retaliated by executing civilians including Jews.

In 1944, during and following the Warsaw Uprising, the Germans deported thousands of Varsovians from the Dulag 121 camp in Pruszków, where they were initially imprisoned, to Końskie. Those Poles were mainly old people, ill people and women with children. 24,000 Poles expelled from Warsaw stayed in the town, as of 1 November 1944.

=== Jewish history of Końskie ===
The first mention of the Jewish community in Końskie dates to the 16th century. The pre World War II Jewish population of Końskie (known as Koinsk during the Russian occupation or Kinsk in Yiddish – קינצק / קינסק) comprised 60.6% of the total population of the town or about 6,500 persons as of September 1939. The town's Jewish cemetery was founded in the 17th century, and expanded to span two hectares with the last burial in 1943.

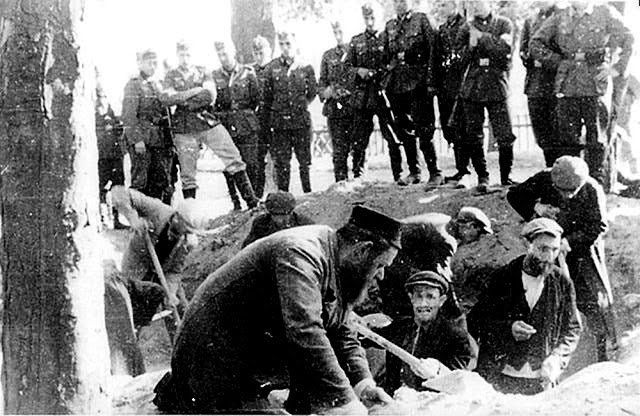
Local Jews digging graves for German soldiers killed in the Battle of Końskie

After the Nazi German invasion of Poland, a ghetto was established in 1940 and closed off in the spring of 1941. The Jews of Końskie and Polish prisoners from Końskie and surrounding towns were forced to dig up the graves, which were used in the construction of pig farms, the Modliszewicach spire, and walls in Końskie and nearby villages. The cemetery was also used as a place of execution for both Jews and Poles.

The complete eradication of the Jewish population of Końskie took place on November 3–9, 1942, when all men, women, and children were loaded into cattle cars to Treblinka II and gassed. Approximately 600 Jews were murdered by the Nazis on the way to the camp. In the subsequent January 1943 "Aktion" in the Konskie Ghetto, the remaining Jews were ferreted out from attics and other hiding places and murdered. The Germans imprisoned several Poles in the local prison, and then deported them to concentration camps for rescuing Jews.

Koinsk appears under the name Bociany as the setting for Chava Rosenfarb's Yiddish language novel of the same name. Bociany was published in English in the author's own translation by Syracuse University Press in 2000. The translation won the John Glassco Award for Literary Translation in 2000.

The Koinsk Organization of Israel ("Ha'Ayarah She'Li: Sefer Ha'Zikaron Le'Yehudei Konskiyah, Hebrew, 2001) commemorates the tragic death of the Jews of Konskie every year at The Diaspora Museum close to the 25th of the Jewish month of Cheshvan.

=== Recent history ===
In 1975–1998, the town was administratively located in the Kielce Voivodeship. Most of the town labour force was employed in the local foundry (Koneckie Zakłady Odlewnicze) in the late 1980s and early 1990s. Since 1997 the town has developed into a major trade centre for small business.

== Notable buildings and landmarks ==
Sights of Końskie (examples)

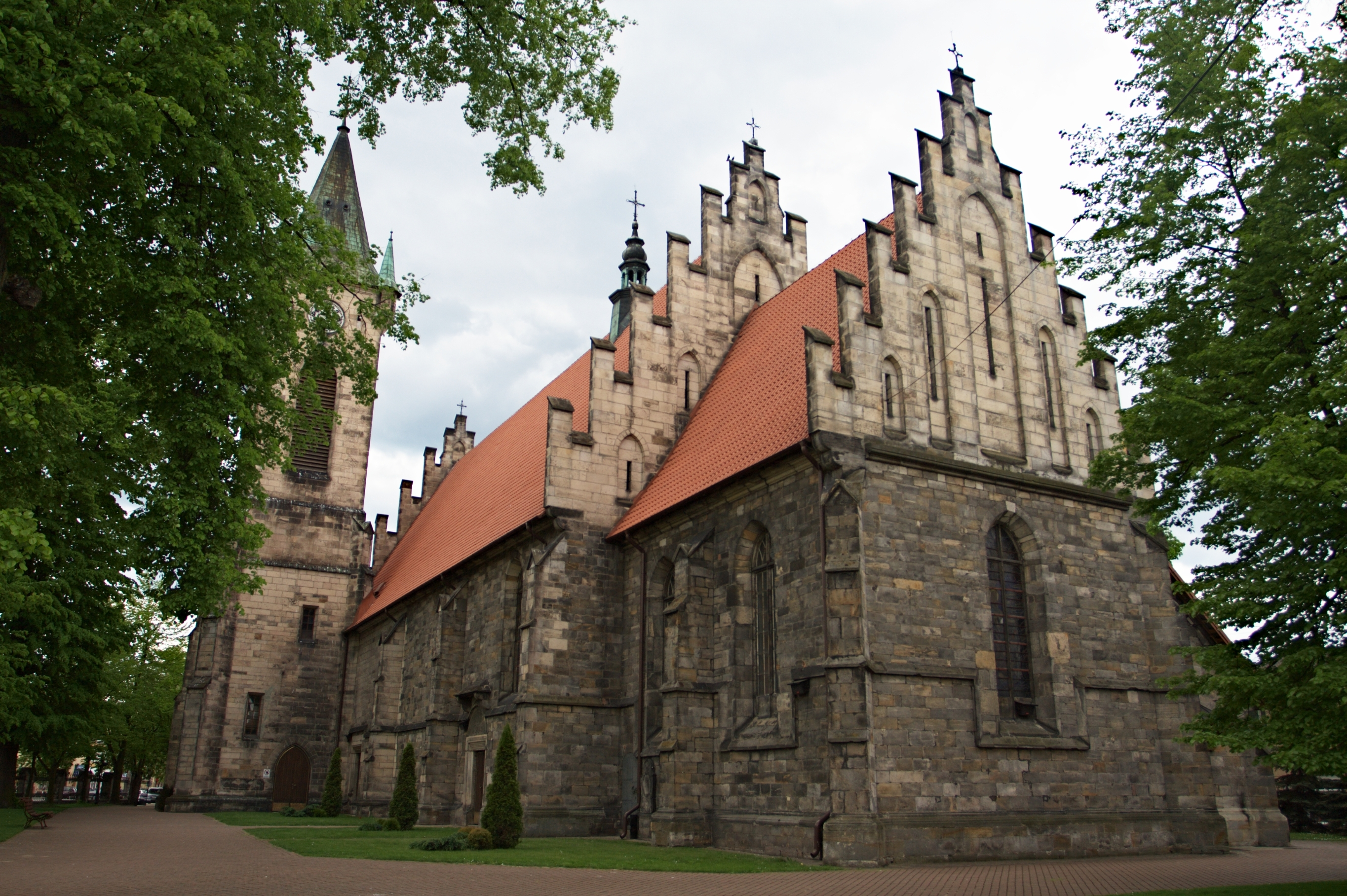
Saint Nicholas church

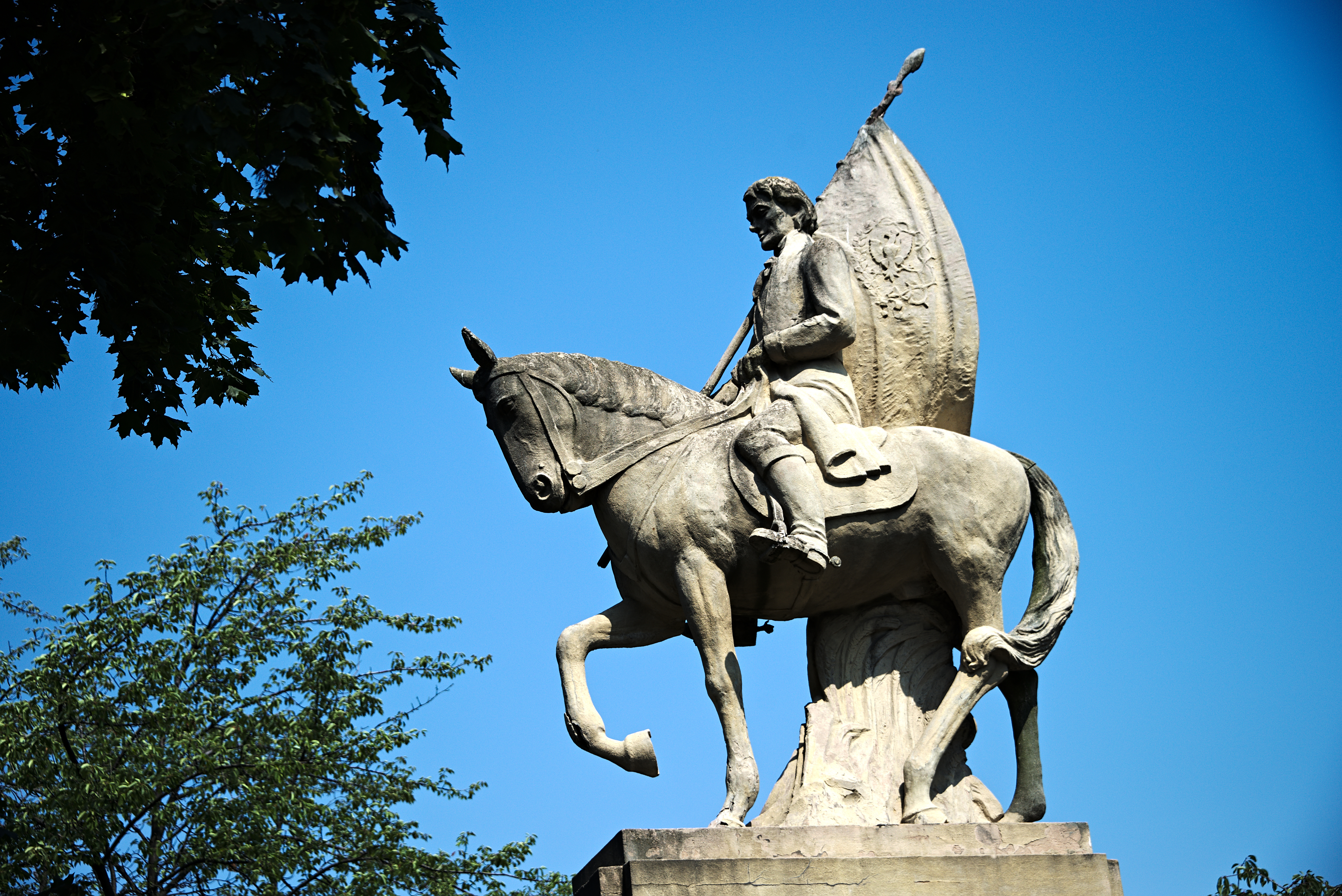
Tadeusz Kościuszko Monument

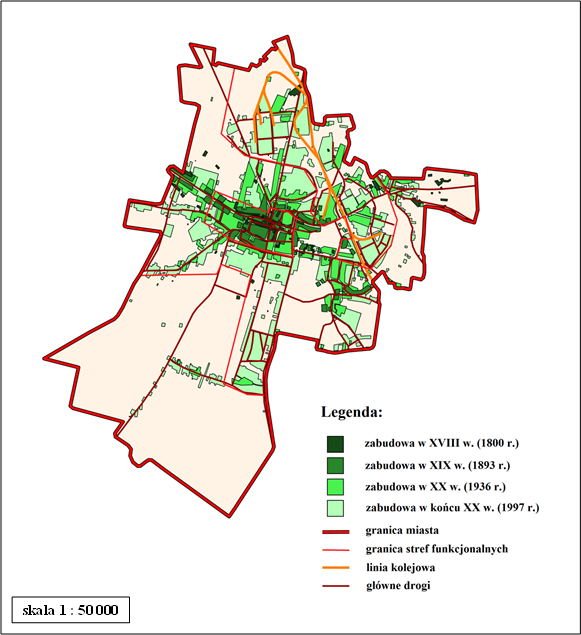
Development of the city of Końskie over the centuries (multiphase map)

- Classicistic Palace and park complex founded by Jan Małachowski of the Nałęcz coat-of-arms in the 17th century (based on Pillnitz complex) includes
  - Egyptian orangery (Egipcjanka)
  - Greek Temple (now theatre)
  - Gloriette
  - Gazebo (Altanka)
  - Two Palace wings (now residence of the municipal council)
  - Memorial to local Polish scouts killed during World War II
  - Community building turned into a pig slaughterhouse by the SS, with Jewish gravestones from the Konskie Jewish cemetery.
- Late Gothic church of Saint Nicholas, 1492, with the Romanesque tympanum from the 13th century. The parish is led by Pralat Zapart
- Baroque church of Saint John the Baptist and Saint Anne
- Monuments of Polish national heroes Tadeusz Kościuszko and Henryk Dobrzański
- Spire, built by the SS with Jewish gravestones from the Konskie Jewish cemetery.
- Cemetery for the German soldiers killed in World War I, respected along with the Polish one
- Home of Jankiel Pelta at ul. Pilsudskiego 42 (38 Maja-ego 3 till the change of address after World War II)
- Końskie Synagogue built 1684, burned in 1939. Its embers and metal remnants remain in Końskie.

== Sports ==
The local football team is Neptun Końskie. It competes in the lower leagues.

== Transport ==
Końskie lies along national road 42 which connects it to Radomsko to the west and to Skarżysko-Kamienna to the east.

Vovoideship roads 749, 746 and 728 all intersect in the town as well.

Końskie has a station on the Opoczno-Skarżysko-Kamienna railway line.

== Notable people ==
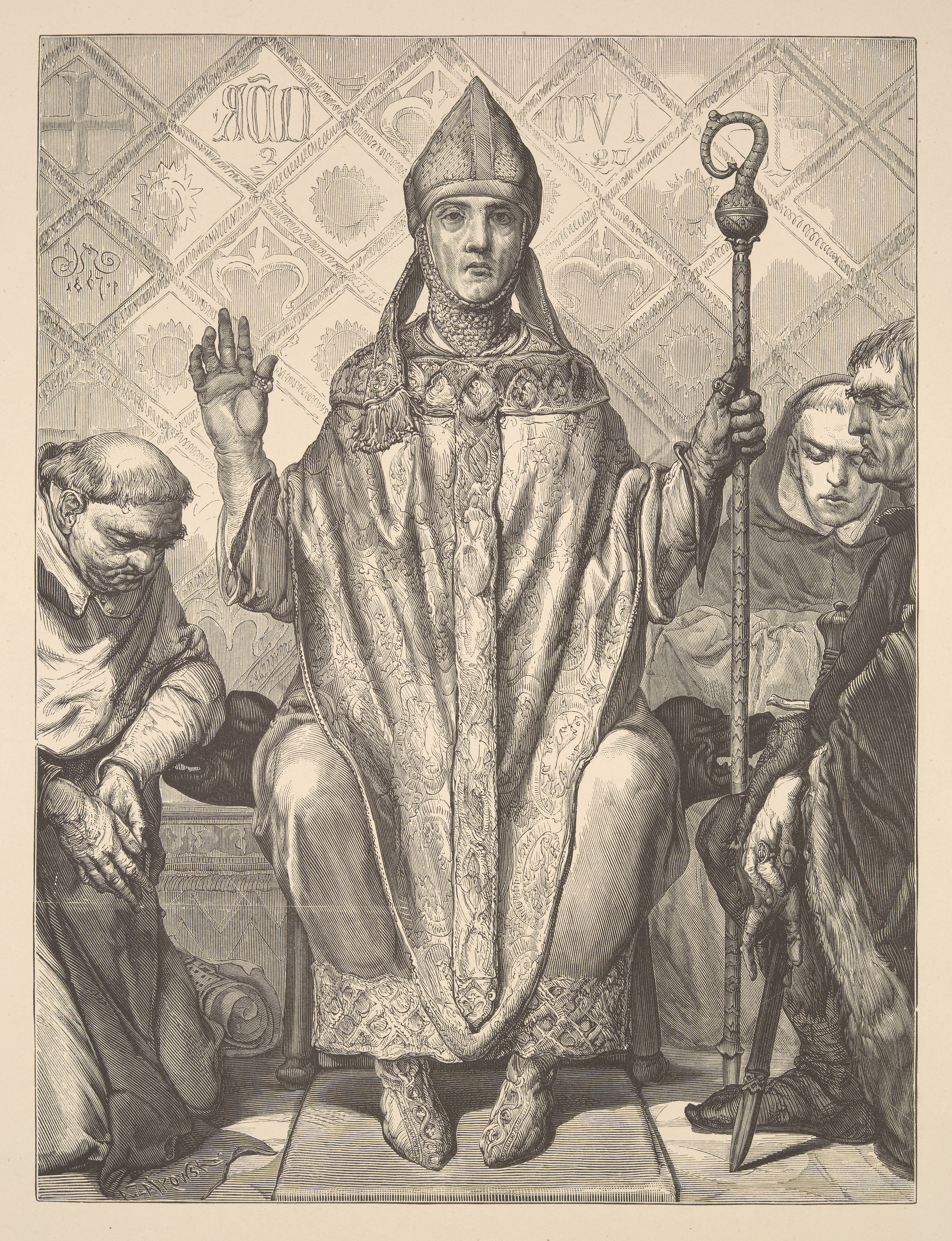
Iwo Odrowąż

- Iwo Odrowąż (died 1229) a medieval Polish humanist, statesman, and bishop.
- Jan Małachowski (1698-1762), Grand Chancellor; father of Stanisław and Jacek
- Stanisław Małachowski (1736–1809) the first Prime Minister of Poland in 1807.
- Jacek Małachowski (1737–1821) a Polish nobleman, politician and administrator
- Yoav Yehoshua Weingarten (1845-1923) rabbi of Kintzk, 1894 to 1923 & author of Torah commentaries.
- Sławomir Lachowski (born 1958) banker, founded mBank, the first internet bank in the region.
- Andrzej Szejna (born 1973) a Polish politician and MEP
- Wiktoria Czyżewska (born 2004) Polish professional mixed martial artist.

== International relations ==
=== Twin towns – Sister cities ===
Końskie is twinned with:

- Šaľa, Slovakia
- Mohyliv-Podilskyi, Ukraine
- Oroszlány, Hungary
