= Końskie County =

Końskie County Powiat konecki
- County
- Flag Coat of arms

- Location within the voivodeship
- Coordinates (Końskie): 51°12′N 20°25′E
- Country: Poland
- Voivodeship: Świętokrzyskie
- Seat: Końskie
- Gminas: Total 8: Gmina Fałków; Gmina Gowarczów; Gmina Końskie; Gmina Radoszyce; Gmina Ruda Maleniecka; Gmina Słupia; Gmina Smyków; Gmina Stąporków

Area
  - Total: 1,139.90 km^{2} (440.12 sq mi)

Population (2019)
  - Total: 77,019
  - Density: 67.566/km^{2} (175.00/sq mi)
  - Urban: 24,815
  - Rural: 52,204
- Car plates: TKN

Końskie County (Polish: powiat konecki) is a unit of territorial administration and local government (powiat) in Świętokrzyskie Voivodeship, central Poland. It came into being on January 1, 1999, as a result of the Polish local government reforms passed in 1998. Its administrative seat and largest town is Końskie, which lies 38 kilometres (24 mi) north of the regional capital Kielce. The only other town in the county is Stąporków, lying 11 km (7 mi) south-east of Końskie.

The county covers an area of 1,139.90 square kilometres (440.1 sq mi). As of 2019 its total population is 77,019, out of which the population of Końskie is 19,176, that of Stąporków is 5,639, and the rural population is 52,204.

== Neighbouring counties ==
Końskie County is bordered by Opoczno County to the north, Przysucha County to the north-east, Szydłowiec County and Skarżysko County to the east, Kielce County to the south, Włoszczowa County to the south-west, and Radomsko County to the west.

== Administrative divisions ==
The county is subdivided into eight gminas (two urban-rural and six rural). These are listed in the following table, in descending order of population.

Gmina	Type	Area (km^{2})	Population (2019)	Seat
Gmina Końskie	urban-rural	249.9	35,217	Końskie
Gmina Stąporków	urban-rural	231.4	16,793	Stąporków
Gmina Radoszyce	rural	146.7	5,766	Radoszyce
Gmina Gowarczów	rural	102.0	4,610	Gowarczów
Gmina Fałków	rural	132.1	4,428	Fałków
Gmina Smyków	rural	62.1	3,794	Smyków
Gmina Słupia Konecka	rural	105.7	3,328	Słupia
Gmina Ruda Maleniecka	rural	110.0	3,083	Ruda Maleniecka
