= Czermno =

Czermno may refer to several places:

- Czermno, Kuyavian-Pomeranian Voivodeship (north-central Poland)
- Czermno, Lublin Voivodeship (east Poland)
- Czermno, Świętokrzyskie Voivodeship (south-central Poland)
- Czermno, Masovian Voivodeship (east-central Poland)
- Czermno Kolonia-Stomorgi

== See also ==
- Czermno-Kolonia, Świętokrzyskie Voivodeship, in south-central Poland
- Czermna (disambiguation)
