= Zbójno =

Zbójno may refer to the following villages in Poland:

- Zbójno, Kuyavian-Pomeranian Voivodeship (north-central Poland)
- Zbójno, Lublin Voivodeship (east Poland)
- Zbójno, Masovian Voivodeship (north-central Poland)
- Zbójno, Świętokrzyskie Voivodeship (south-central Poland)
- Zbójno, Greater Poland Voivodeship (central Poland)

See also: Zbójno-Sępskie Niwy
