= Čermná =

Čermná may refer to places in the Czech Republic:

- Čermná (Domažlice District), a municipality and village in the Plzeň Region
- Čermná (Trutnov District), a municipality and village in the Hradec Králové Region
- Čermná, a village and part of Hrádek (Klatovy District) in the Plzeň Region
- Čermná, a village and part of Libouchec in the Ústí nad Labem Region
- Čermná nad Orlicí, a municipality and village in the Hradec Králové Region
- Čermná ve Slezsku, a municipality and village in the Moravian-Silesian Region
- Česká Čermná, a municipality and village in the Hradec Králové Region
- Dolní Čermná, a municipality and village in the Pardubice Region
- Horní Čermná, a municipality and village in the Pardubice Region

== See also ==
- Czermna (disambiguation)
