= Troszyn =

Troszyn may refer to:

- Troszyn, Masovian Voivodeship (east-central Poland)
- Troszyn, Gryfino County in West Pomeranian Voivodeship (north-west Poland)
- Troszyn, Kamień County in West Pomeranian Voivodeship (north-west Poland)
- Troszyn Polski

== See also ==
- Nowy Troszyn, a village in the administrative district of Gmina Gąbin, Płock County, Masovian Voivodeship, east-central Poland
