= Smyków =

Smyków may refer to the following places:

- Smyków, Lesser Poland Voivodeship (south Poland)
- Smyków, Gmina Daleszyce in Świętokrzyskie Voivodeship (south-central Poland)
- Smyków, Gmina Raków in Świętokrzyskie Voivodeship (south-central Poland)
- Smyków, Gmina Fałków in Świętokrzyskie Voivodeship (south-central Poland)
- Smyków, Gmina Smyków in Świętokrzyskie Voivodeship (south-central Poland)
- Smyków, Silesian Voivodeship (south Poland)

== See also ==
- Smyków-Boroniewskie in Świętokrzyskie Voivodeship (south-central Poland)
