= Oddziały =

- Part of Village
- Location within Poland
- Coordinates: 51°11′59″N 20°01′50″E
- Country: Poland
- Voivodeship: Świętokrzyskie
- County: Końskie
- Gmina: Fałków

Oddziały [ɔdˈd͡ʑawɨ] is a part of village Sulborowice in the administrative district of Gmina Fałków, within Końskie County, Świętokrzyskie Voivodeship, in south-central Poland.
