= Studzieniec =

Studzieniec may refer to the following places:

- Studzieniec, Sierpc County in Masovian Voivodeship (east-central Poland)
- Studzieniec, Subcarpathian Voivodeship (south-east Poland)
- Studzieniec, Świętokrzyskie Voivodeship (south-central Poland)
- Studzieniec, Żyrardów County in Masovian Voivodeship (east-central Poland)
- Studzieniec, Chodzież County in Greater Poland Voivodeship (west-central Poland)
- Studzieniec, Oborniki County in Greater Poland Voivodeship (west-central Poland)
- Studzieniec, Lubusz Voivodeship (west Poland)
- Studzieniec, Warmian-Masurian Voivodeship (north Poland)
