= Rudzisko, Świętokrzyskie Voivodeship =

Rudzisko
- Village
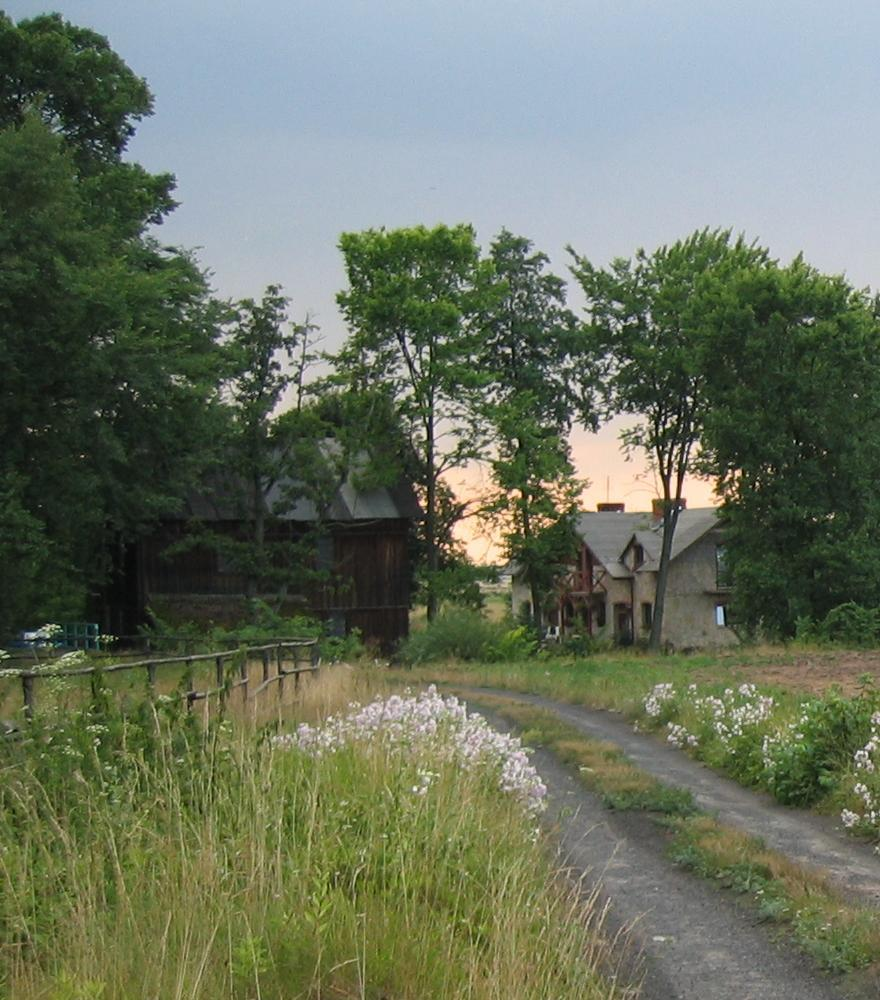

- Location within Poland
- Coordinates: 51°11′4″N 20°4′52″E
- Country: Poland
- Voivodeship: Świętokrzyskie
- County: Końskie
- Gmina: Fałków
- Population: 55

Rudzisko [ruˈd͡ʑiskɔ] is a village in the administrative district of Gmina Fałków, within Końskie County, Świętokrzyskie Voivodeship, in south-central Poland. It lies approximately 6 km (4 mi) north of Fałków, 24 km (15 mi) west of Końskie, and 51 km (32 mi) north-west of the regional capital Kielce.
