= Olszamowice =

- Village
- Location within Poland
- Coordinates: 51°6′35″N 20°3′10″E
- Country: Poland
- Voivodeship: Świętokrzyskie
- County: Końskie
- Gmina: Fałków
- Population: 290

Olszamowice [ɔlʂamɔˈvit͡sɛ] is a village in the administrative district of Gmina Fałków, within Końskie County, Świętokrzyskie Voivodeship, in south-central Poland. It lies approximately 5 km (3 mi) south-west of Fałków, 28 km (17 mi) west of Końskie, and 47 km (29 mi) north-west of the regional capital Kielce.
