= Bulianów =

- Village
- Location within Poland
- Coordinates: 51°9′34″N 20°3′2″E
- Country: Poland
- Voivodeship: Świętokrzyskie
- County: Końskie
- Gmina: Fałków
- Population: 71

Bulianów [buˈljanuf] is a village in the administrative district of Gmina Fałków, within Końskie County, Świętokrzyskie Voivodeship, in south-central Poland. It lies approximately 5 km (3 mi) north-west of Fałków, 26 km (16 mi) west of Końskie, and 51 km (32 mi) north-west of the regional capital Kielce.
