= Julianów, Końskie County =

Julianów
- Village
- Location within Poland
- Coordinates: 51°8′N 20°2′E
- Country: Poland
- Voivodeship: Świętokrzyskie
- County: Końskie
- Gmina: Fałków

Julianów [juˈljanuf] is a village in the administrative district of Gmina Fałków, within Końskie County, Świętokrzyskie Voivodeship, in south-central Poland. It lies approximately 5 km (3 mi) west of Fałków, 28 km (17 mi) west of Końskie, and 50 km (31 mi) north-west of the regional capital Kielce.
