= Stary Kamień =

Stary Kamień may refer to the following places:

- Stary Kamień, Masovian Voivodeship (east-central Poland)
- Stary Kamień, Podlaskie Voivodeship (north-east Poland)
- Stary Kamień, Pomeranian Voivodeship (north Poland)
