= Turowice =

Turowice may refer to the following places:

- Turowice, Grójec County in Masovian Voivodeship (east-central Poland)
- Turowice, Piaseczno County in Masovian Voivodeship (east-central Poland)
- Turowice, Świętokrzyskie Voivodeship (south-central Poland)
