= Pląskowice =

- Village
- Location within Poland
- Coordinates: 51°9′11″N 20°4′8″E
- Country: Poland
- Voivodeship: Świętokrzyskie
- County: Końskie
- Gmina: Fałków
- Population: 110

Pląskowice [plɔ̃skɔˈvit͡sɛ] is a village in the administrative district of Gmina Fałków, within Końskie County, Świętokrzyskie Voivodeship, in south-central Poland. It lies approximately 4 km (2 mi) north-west of Fałków, 25 km (16 mi) west of Końskie, and 49 km (30 mi) north-west of the regional capital Kielce.
