= Budy, Końskie County =

Budy
- Village
- Location within Poland
- Coordinates: 51°4′24″N 20°5′23″E
- Country: Poland
- Voivodeship: Świętokrzyskie
- County: Końskie
- Gmina: Fałków
- Population: 190

Budy [ˈbudɨ] is a village in the administrative district of Gmina Fałków, within Końskie County, Świętokrzyskie Voivodeship, in south-central Poland. It lies approximately 7 km (4 mi) south of Fałków, 27 km (17 mi) south-west of Końskie, and 43 km (27 mi) north-west of the regional capital Kielce.
