= Stanisławów, Świętokrzyskie Voivodeship =

Stanisławów
- Village
- Location within Poland
- Coordinates: 51°4′12″N 20°1′48″E
- Country: Poland
- Voivodeship: Świętokrzyskie
- County: Końskie
- Gmina: Fałków

Stanisławów [staniˈswavuf] is a village in the administrative district of Gmina Fałków, within Końskie County, Świętokrzyskie Voivodeship, in south-central Poland. It lies approximately 9 km (6 mi) south-west of Fałków, 31 km (19 mi) south-west of Końskie, and 47 km (29 mi) north-west of the regional capital Kielce.
