= Starzechowice =

- Village
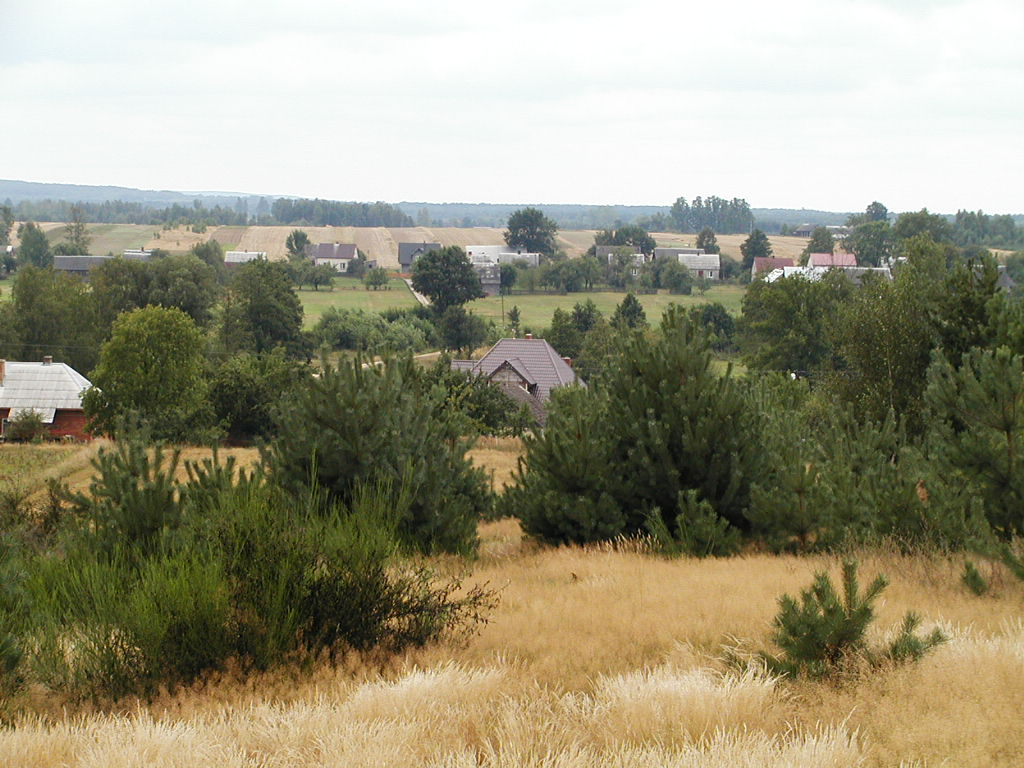

- Location within Poland
- Coordinates: 51°10′25″N 20°5′7″E
- Country: Poland
- Voivodeship: Świętokrzyskie
- County: Końskie
- Gmina: Fałków

Starzechowice [staʐɛxɔˈvit͡sɛ] is a village in the administrative district of Gmina Fałków, within Końskie County, Świętokrzyskie Voivodeship, in south-central Poland. It lies approximately 5 km (3 mi) north of Fałków, 24 km (15 mi) west of Końskie, and 50 km (31 mi) north-west of the regional capital Kielce.
