= Rudka, Końskie County =

Rudka
- Village
- Location within Poland
- Coordinates: 51°8′N 20°5′E
- Country: Poland
- Voivodeship: Świętokrzyskie
- County: Końskie
- Gmina: Fałków

Rudka [ˈrutka] is a village in the administrative district of Gmina Fałków, within Końskie County, Świętokrzyskie Voivodeship, in south-central Poland. It lies approximately 2 km (1 mi) west of Fałków, 25 km (16 mi) west of Końskie, and 47 km (29 mi) north-west of the regional capital Kielce.
