= Wąsosz (disambiguation) =

Wąsosz is a town in south-western Poland.

Wąsosz may also refer to:

- Wąsosz, Kuyavian-Pomeranian Voivodeship, north-central Poland
- Wąsosz, Podlaskie Voivodeship, north-eastern Poland, near the regional capital Białystok
- Wąsosz, Gmina Końskie in Świętokrzyskie Voivodeship (south-central Poland)
- Wąsosz, Gmina Fałków in Świętokrzyskie Voivodeship (south-central Poland)
- Wąsosz, Greater Poland Voivodeship, west-central Poland
- Wąsosz, Gmina Koniecpol in Silesian Voivodeship (southern Poland)
- Wąsosz, Gmina Konopiska in Silesian Voivodeship (southern Poland)
- Wąsosz, West Pomeranian Voivodeship, north-western Poland
