= Gustawów, Gmina Fałków =

Gustawów
- Village
- Location within Poland
- Coordinates: 51°4′59″N 19°59′29″E
- Country: Poland
- Voivodeship: Świętokrzyskie
- County: Końskie
- Gmina: Fałków
- Population: 160

Gustawów [ɡusˈtavuf] is a village in the administrative district of Gmina Fałków, within Końskie County, Świętokrzyskie Voivodeship, in south-central Poland. It lies approximately 10 km (6 mi) south-west of Fałków, 33 km (21 mi) south-west of Końskie, and 50 km (31 mi) north-west of the regional capital Kielce.
