= Nowe Wymyśle =

- Village
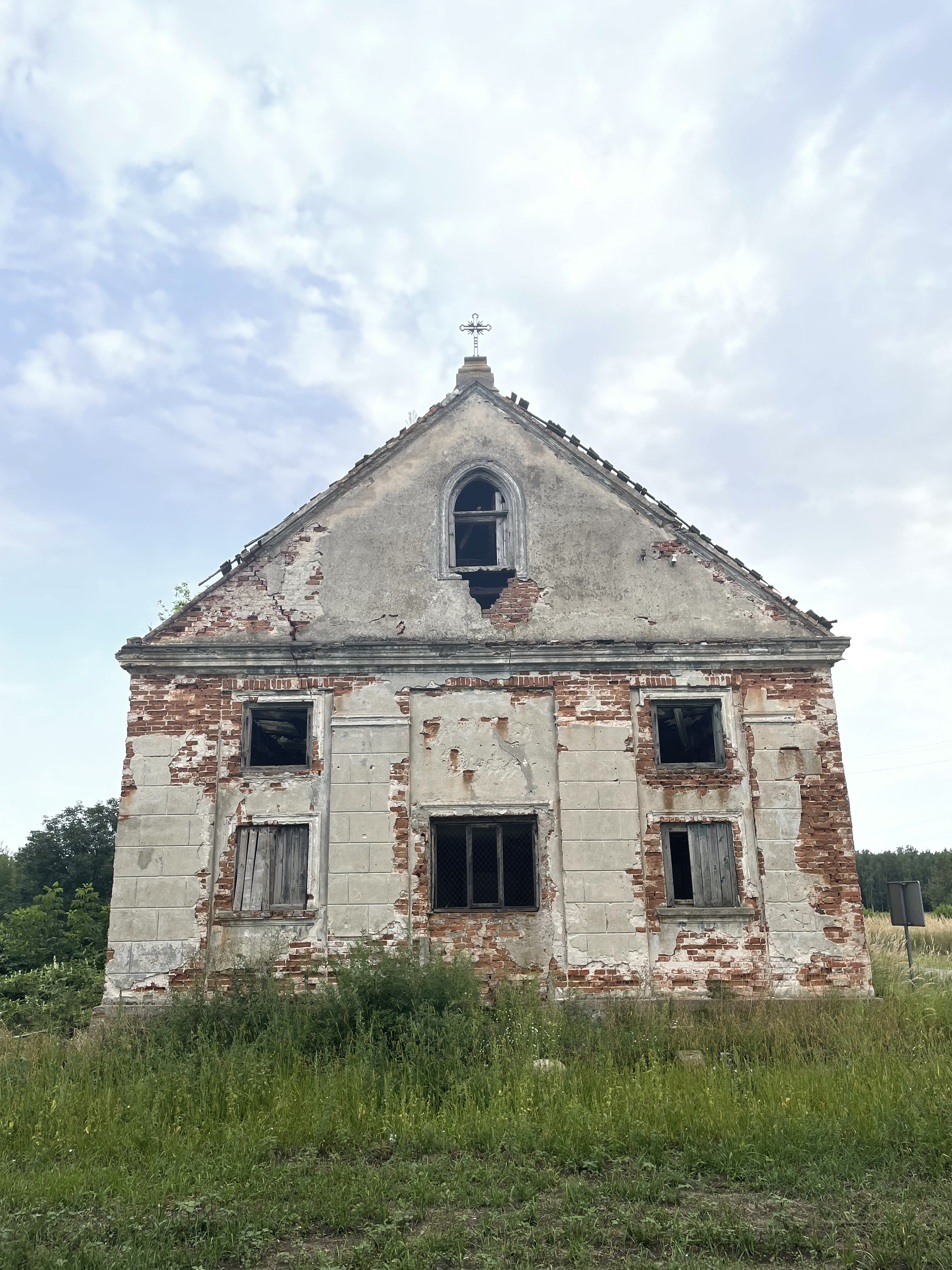

- Location within Poland
- Coordinates: 52°25′N 19°50′E
- Country: Poland
- Voivodeship: Masovian
- County: Płock
- Gmina: Gąbin

Population
  - Total: 183
- Time zone: UTC+1 (CET)
  - Summer (DST): UTC+2 (CEST)
- Vehicle registration: WPL

Nowe Wymyśle [ˈnɔvɛ vɨˈmɨɕlɛ] is a village in the administrative district of Gmina Gąbin, within Płock County, Masovian Voivodeship, in central Poland.

== History ==
The town was once known as Wymyśle Niemieckie and was predominantly Mennonite. Wymyśle Niemieckie was adjacent to the town of Gąbin, half of the population of which was Jewish. Following the German invasion of Poland, which started World War II, the German Nazis rounded up the Jews of Gąbin and confiscated their property. Eager to profit from the ethnic cleansing of the Jewish population and wanting to comply with Nazi policies of Germanization, the Mennonites of Wymyśle Niemieckie claimed the formerly Jewish homes and businesses as their own. Mennonite women often solidified their loyalty to the Nazis by marrying soldiers of the German Wehrmacht, with many weddings being performed in the Mennonite church of Wymyśle Niemieckie involving couples dressed in Nazi uniforms. Erich L. Ratzlaff, a prominent Mennonite Nazi who became Mayor of Gąbin, was known to carry a whip in order to terrorize Jews. Ratzlaff later immigrated to Canada and became an editor of the Mennonitische Rundschau newspaper from 1967 to 1979.

== Notable residents ==
- Erich L. Ratzlaff, a Mennonite Nazi.
