= Erich L. Ratzlaff =

Polish politician (1911–1988)

- Born: 8 August 1911; Deutsch-Wymysle, Plock, Russian Empire
- Died: 18 October 1988 (aged 77); Abbotsford, British Columbia, Canada

Erich L. Ratzlaff (8 August 1911 – 18 October 1988) was a prominent Mennonite Nazi who served as Mayor of Gąbin when it came under German control, and was known for terrorizing the Jewish population. An emigrant to Canada, Ratzlaff served as editor of the Mennonite newspaper Mennonitische Rundschau from 1967 to 1979.

== Personal life ==
Ratzlaff was born in Deutsch-Wymyschle on August 8, 1911, the son of Leonard P. and Anna Wohlgemuth Ratzlaff. In 1913, the family moved to Millervo, Russia, returning to Deutsch-Wymyschle in 1918. Ratzlaff received his education in Deutsch-Wymyschle. He was baptized and received into the Mennonite Brethren Church in Wymyschle in 1928, where his father was an elder of the church.

In 1948, Ratzlaff and his family emigrated to Acme, Alberta. There were no job opportunities, so they moved to the neighborhood of Arnold in Abbotsford, British Columbia in 1951. Ratzlaff died in the Clearbrook neighborhood of Abbotsford on October 18, 1988.

== Nazism ==
Colin Neufeldt, a relative of Ratzlaff, wrote the chapter "Mennonite Collaboration with Nazism" for the book European Mennonites and the Holocaust, addressing Ratzlaff's Nazi history. Along with some other prominent European Mennonites, the full history of Ratzlaff's Nazism had not been incorporated into his biography until recently. Prior to World War II, Ratzlaff was an Ortsgruppenleiter (local group leader) in the Nazi Party. Following the German Invasion of Poland on September 1, 1939, Ratzlaff was appointed Mayor (rühere Amtskommissar) of Gąbin. Gąbin's population was nearly half Jewish, while the nearby town of Deutsch-Wymyschle was predominantly Mennonite. The Nazis rounded up the Jews of Gąbin and confiscated their property. Eager to profit from the ethnic cleansing of the Jewish population and wanting to comply with Nazi policies of Germanization, the Mennonites of Deutsch Wymyschle claimed the formerly Jewish homes and businesses as their own. Ratzlaff was known to carry a whip in order to terrorize Jews.

== See also ==
- Anabaptist–Jewish relations
