= Reczków =

- Village
- Location within Poland
- Coordinates: 51°12′N 20°2′E
- Country: Poland
- Voivodeship: Świętokrzyskie
- County: Końskie
- Gmina: Fałków
- Population (approx.): 40

Reczków [ˈrɛt͡ʂkuf] is a village in the administrative district of Gmina Fałków, within Końskie County, Świętokrzyskie Voivodeship, in south-central Poland. It lies approximately 9 km (6 mi) north-west of Fałków, 27 km (17 mi) west of Końskie, and 54 km (34 mi) north-west of the regional capital Kielce.
