= Skórnice =

- Village
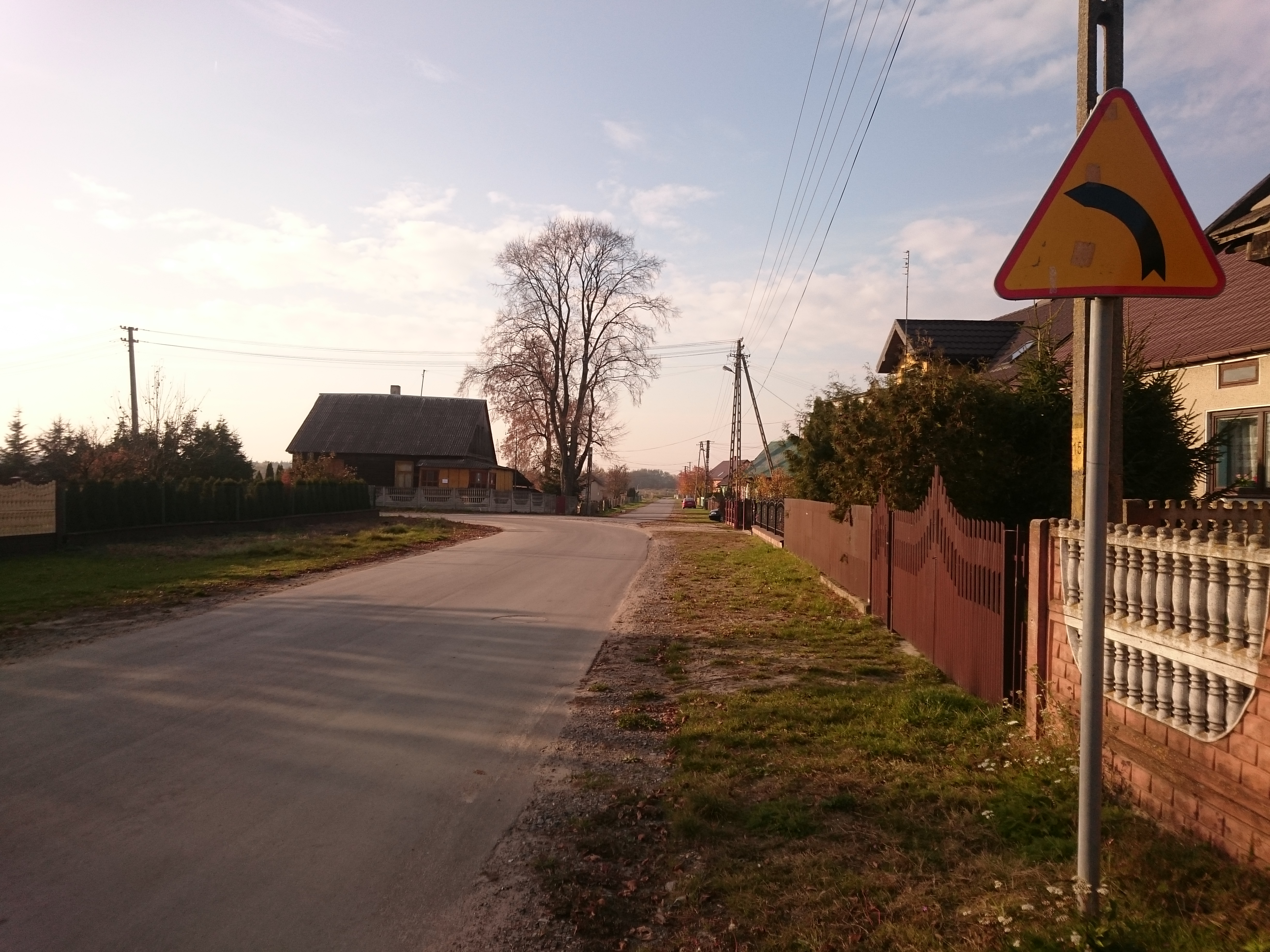

- Location within Poland
- Coordinates: 51°8′7″N 20°4′4″E
- Country: Poland
- Voivodeship: Świętokrzyskie
- County: Końskie
- Gmina: Fałków
- Population: 440

Skórnice [skurˈnit͡sɛ] is a village in the administrative district of Gmina Fałków, within Końskie County, Świętokrzyskie Voivodeship, in south-central Poland. It lies approximately 3 km (2 mi) west of Fałków, 26 km (16 mi) west of Końskie, and 48 km (30 mi) north-west of the regional capital Kielce.

== See also ==
- Skórnice-Poręba
