= Wola Szkucka =

- Village
- Location within Poland
- Coordinates: 51°6′57″N 20°7′33″E
- Country: Poland
- Voivodeship: Świętokrzyskie
- County: Końskie
- Gmina: Fałków
- Population: 340

Wola Szkucka [ˈvɔla ˈʂkut͡ska] is a village in the administrative district of Gmina Fałków, within Końskie County, Świętokrzyskie Voivodeship, in south-central Poland. It lies approximately 3 km (2 mi) south-east of Fałków, 23 km (14 mi) south-west of Końskie, and 43 km (27 mi) north-west of the regional capital Kielce.
