= Sułków, Końskie County =

Sułków
- Village
- Location within Poland
- Coordinates: 51°7′12″N 20°3′57″E
- Country: Poland
- Voivodeship: Świętokrzyskie
- County: Końskie
- Gmina: Fałków
- Population: 50

Sułków [ˈsuu̯kuf] is a village in the administrative district of Gmina Fałków, within Końskie County, Świętokrzyskie Voivodeship, in south-central Poland. It lies approximately 4 km (2 mi) south-west of Fałków, 27 km (17 mi) west of Końskie, and 47 km (29 mi) north-west of the regional capital Kielce.

As per census 2011, it has a population of 127.
