= Pikule, Świętokrzyskie Voivodeship =

Pikule
- Village
- Location within Poland
- Coordinates: 51°5′N 20°2′E
- Country: Poland
- Voivodeship: Świętokrzyskie
- County: Końskie
- Gmina: Fałków

Pikule [piˈkulɛ] is a village in the administrative district of Gmina Fałków, within Końskie County, Świętokrzyskie Voivodeship, in south-central Poland. It lies approximately 8 km (5 mi) south-west of Fałków, 30 km (19 mi) south-west of Końskie, and 47 km (29 mi) north-west of the regional capital Kielce.
