= Skórnice-Poręba =

- Village
- Location within Poland
- Coordinates: 51°07′43″N 20°02′01″E
- Country: Poland
- Voivodeship: Świętokrzyskie
- County: Końskie
- Gmina: Fałków

Skórnice-Poręba [skurˈnit͡sɛ pɔˈrɛmba] is a village in the administrative district of Gmina Fałków, within Końskie County, Świętokrzyskie Voivodeship, in south-central Poland.

== See also ==
- Skórnice
