= Jordanów, Masovian Voivodeship =

Jordanów
- Village
- Location within Poland
- Coordinates: 52°29′N 19°45′E
- Country: Poland
- Voivodeship: Masovian
- County: Płock
- Gmina: Gąbin
- Population: 186

Jordanów [jɔrˈdanuf] is a village in the administrative district of Gmina Gąbin, within Płock County, Masovian Voivodeship, in east-central Poland.
