= Budy-Jakubowice =

- Village
- Location within Poland
- Coordinates: 51°04′48″N 20°05′36″E
- Country: Poland
- Voivodeship: Świętokrzyskie
- County: Końskie
- Gmina: Fałków

Budy-Jakubowice [ˈbudɨ jakubɔˈvit͡sɛ] is a village in the administrative district of Gmina Fałków, within Końskie County, Świętokrzyskie Voivodeship, in south-central Poland.
