= Wąsosz, Gmina Fałków =

Wąsosz
- Village
- Location within Poland
- Coordinates: 51°7′52″N 20°0′43″E
- Country: Poland
- Voivodeship: Świętokrzyskie
- County: Końskie
- Gmina: Fałków

Population
  - Total: 220
- Postal code: 26-260

Wąsosz [ˈvɔ̃sɔʂ] is a village in the administrative district of Gmina Fałków, within Końskie County, Świętokrzyskie Voivodeship, in south-central Poland. It lies approximately 7 km (4 mi) west of Fałków, 30 km (19 mi) west of Końskie, and 51 km (32 mi) north-west of the regional capital Kielce.
