= Topólno =

- Village
- Location within Poland
- Coordinates: 52°23′N 19°47′E
- Country: Poland
- Voivodeship: Masovian
- County: Płock
- Gmina: Gąbin

Population
  - Total: 337
- Time zone: UTC+1 (CET)
  - Summer (DST): UTC+2 (CEST)
- Vehicle registration: WPL

Topólno [tɔˈpulnɔ] is a village in the administrative district of Gmina Gąbin, within Płock County, Masovian Voivodeship, in central Poland.
