= Papiernia, Końskie County =

Papiernia
- Village
- Location within Poland
- Coordinates: 51°11′03″N 20°02′19″E
- Country: Poland
- Voivodeship: Świętokrzyskie
- County: Końskie
- Gmina: Fałków
- Population: 30

Papiernia [paˈpjɛrɲa] is a village in the administrative district of Gmina Fałków, within Końskie County, Świętokrzyskie Voivodeship, in south-central Poland.
