= Gmina Fałków =

Gmina Fałków Fałków Commune
- Gmina
- Coat of arms
- Interactive map of Gmina Fałków
- Coordinates (Fałków): 51°8′5″N 20°6′8″E
- Country: Poland
- Voivodeship: Świętokrzyskie
- County: Końskie
- Seat: Fałków

Area
  - Total: 132.1 km^{2} (51.0 sq mi)

Population (2006)
  - Total: 4,803
  - Density: 36.36/km^{2} (94.17/sq mi)

Gmina Fałków is a rural gmina (administrative district) in Końskie County, Świętokrzyskie Voivodeship, in south-central Poland. Its seat is the village of Fałków, which lies approximately 24 kilometres (15 mi) west of Końskie and 46 km (29 mi) north-west of the regional capital Kielce.

The gmina covers an area of 132.1 square kilometres (51.0 sq mi), and as of 2006 its total population is 4,803.

The gmina contains part of the protected area called Przedbórz Landscape Park.

== Villages ==
Gmina Fałków contains the villages and settlements of Budy, Budy-Adelinów, Budy-Dobry Widok, Budy-Jakubowice, Budy-Szpinek, Budy-Szreniawa, Bulianów, Czermno, Czermno Kolonia-Stomorgi, Czermno-Kolonia, Dąbrowa, Fałków, Greszczyn, Gustawów, Julianów, Leszczyny, Olszamowice, Olszamowice-Porąbka, Papiernia, Pikule, Pląskowice, Reczków, Rudka, Rudzisko, Skórnice, Skórnice-Poręba, Smyków, Smyków-Boroniewskie, Stanisławów, Starzechowice, Studzieniec, Sulborowice, Sulborowice Oddziały, Sułków, Trawno, Turowice, Wąsosz, Wola Szkucka, Zbójno, Zbójno-Sępskie Niwy and Zygmuntów.

== Neighbouring gminas ==
Gmina Fałków is bordered by the gminas of Przedbórz, Ruda Maleniecka, Słupia and Żarnów.
