= Ludwików, Gmina Gąbin =

Ludwików
- Village
- Location within Poland
- Coordinates: 52°27′N 19°43′E
- Country: Poland
- Voivodeship: Masovian
- County: Płock
- Gmina: Gąbin

Population
  - Total: 196
- Time zone: UTC+1 (CET)
  - Summer (DST): UTC+2 (CEST)
- Vehicle registration: WPL

Ludwików [ludˈvikuf] is a village in the administrative district of Gmina Gąbin, within Płock County, Masovian Voivodeship, in central Poland.
