= Dąbrowa, Końskie County =

Dąbrowa
- Village
- Location within Poland
- Coordinates: 51°09′56″N 20°04′16″E
- Country: Poland
- Voivodeship: Świętokrzyskie
- County: Końskie
- Gmina: Fałków

Dąbrowa [dɔmˈbrɔva] is a village in the administrative district of Gmina Fałków, within Końskie County, Świętokrzyskie Voivodeship, in south-central Poland.
