= Turowice, Świętokrzyskie Voivodeship =

Turowice
- Village
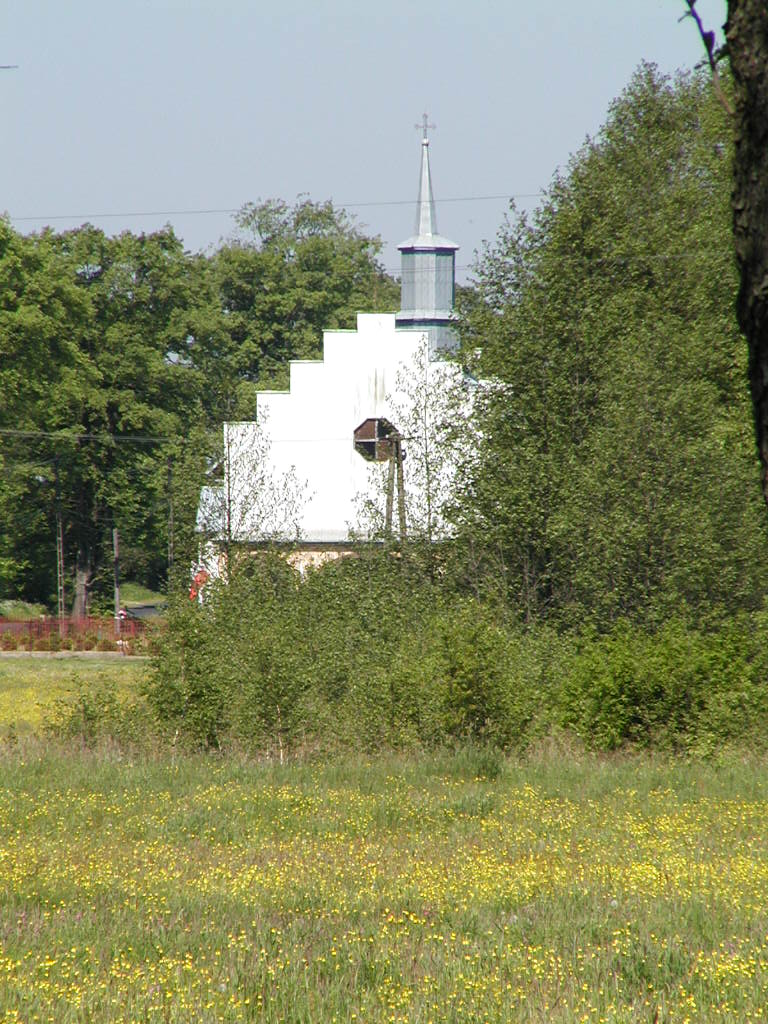
- Chapel

- Location within Poland
- Coordinates: 51°10′50″N 20°3′31″E
- Country: Poland
- Voivodeship: Świętokrzyskie
- County: Końskie
- Gmina: Fałków
- Population: 360

Turowice [turɔˈvit͡sɛ] is a village in the administrative district of Gmina Fałków, within Końskie County, Świętokrzyskie Voivodeship, in south-central Poland. It lies approximately 6 km (4 mi) north-west of Fałków, 26 km (16 mi) west of Końskie, and 52 km (32 mi) north-west of the regional capital Kielce.
