= Sępskie Niwy =

- Village
- Location within Poland
- Coordinates: 51°09′06″N 20°07′10″E
- Country: Poland
- Voivodeship: Świętokrzyskie
- County: Końskie
- Gmina: Fałków

Sępskie Niwy [ˈsɛmpskʲɛ ˈnivɨ] is a part of village Zbójno in the administrative district of Gmina Fałków, within Końskie County, Świętokrzyskie Voivodeship, in south-central Poland.
