= Budy-Adelinów =

Village in Gmina Fałków, Poland

- Village
- Location within Poland
- Coordinates: 51°04′21″N 20°04′41″E
- Country: Poland
- Voivodeship: Świętokrzyskie
- County: Końskie
- Gmina: Fałków

Budy-Adelinów [ˈbudɨ adɛˈlinuf] is a village in the administrative district of Gmina Fałków, within Końskie County, Świętokrzyskie Voivodeship, in south-central Poland.
