= Studzieniec, Świętokrzyskie Voivodeship =

Studzieniec
- Village
- Location within Poland
- Coordinates: 51°6′26″N 20°5′22″E
- Country: Poland
- Voivodeship: Świętokrzyskie
- County: Końskie
- Gmina: Fałków
- Population: 200

Studzieniec [stuˈd͡ʑɛɲɛt͡s] is a village in the administrative district of Gmina Fałków, within Końskie County, Świętokrzyskie Voivodeship, in south-central Poland. It lies approximately 4 km (2 mi) south of Fałków, 26 km (16 mi) south-west of Końskie, and 45 km (28 mi) north-west of the regional capital Kielce.
