= Leszczyny, Końskie County =

Leszczyny
- Village
- Location within Poland
- Coordinates: 51°05′07″N 20°02′40″E
- Country: Poland
- Voivodeship: Świętokrzyskie
- County: Końskie
- Gmina: Fałków

Leszczyny [lɛʂˈt͡ʂɨnɨ] is a village in the administrative district of Gmina Fałków, within Końskie County, Świętokrzyskie Voivodeship, in south-central Poland.
