= Budy-Dobry Widok =

- Village
- Location within Poland
- Coordinates: 51°00′00″N 20°03′53″E
- Country: Poland
- Voivodeship: Świętokrzyskie
- County: Końskie
- Gmina: Fałków

Budy-Dobry Widok [ˈbudɨ ˈdɔbrɨ ˈvidɔk] is a village in the administrative district of Gmina Fałków, within Końskie County, Świętokrzyskie Voivodeship, in south-central Poland.
