= Czermna =

Czermna may refer to:

- Czermna, Lesser Poland Voivodeship, a town in south-eastern Poland
- Czermna (Kudowa-Zdrój) a district of Kudowa-Zdrój in south-western Poland, famed for its Skull Chapel

== See also ==
- Čermná (disambiguation)
- Czermno (disambiguation)
