= Zygmuntów, Świętokrzyskie Voivodeship =

Zygmuntów
- Village
- Location within Poland
- Coordinates: 51°06′34″N 20°06′38″E
- Country: Poland
- Voivodeship: Świętokrzyskie
- County: Końskie
- Gmina: Fałków

Zygmuntów [zɨɡˈmuntuf] is a village in the administrative district of Gmina Fałków, within Końskie County, Świętokrzyskie Voivodeship, in south-central Poland.
