= Czermno-Kolonia =

- Village
- Location within Poland
- Coordinates: 51°6′35″N 20°1′38″E
- Country: Poland
- Voivodeship: Świętokrzyskie
- County: Końskie
- Gmina: Fałków

Czermno-Kolonia [ˈt͡ʂɛrmnɔ kɔˈlɔɲa] is a village in the administrative district of Gmina Fałków, within Końskie County, Świętokrzyskie Voivodeship, in south-central Poland. It lies approximately 6 km (4 mi) south-west of Fałków, 29 km (18 mi) west of Końskie, and 49 km (30 mi) north-west of the regional capital Kielce.
