= Sulborowice =

- Village
- Location within Poland
- Coordinates: 51°11′36″N 20°2′14″E
- Country: Poland
- Voivodeship: Świętokrzyskie
- County: Końskie
- Gmina: Fałków
- Population: 220

Sulborowice [sulbɔrɔˈvit͡sɛ] is a village in the administrative district of Gmina Fałków, within Końskie County, Świętokrzyskie Voivodeship, in south-central Poland. It lies approximately 8 km (5 mi) north-west of Fałków, 27 km (17 mi) west of Końskie, and 54 km (34 mi) north-west of the regional capital Kielce.
