= Greszczyn =

- Village
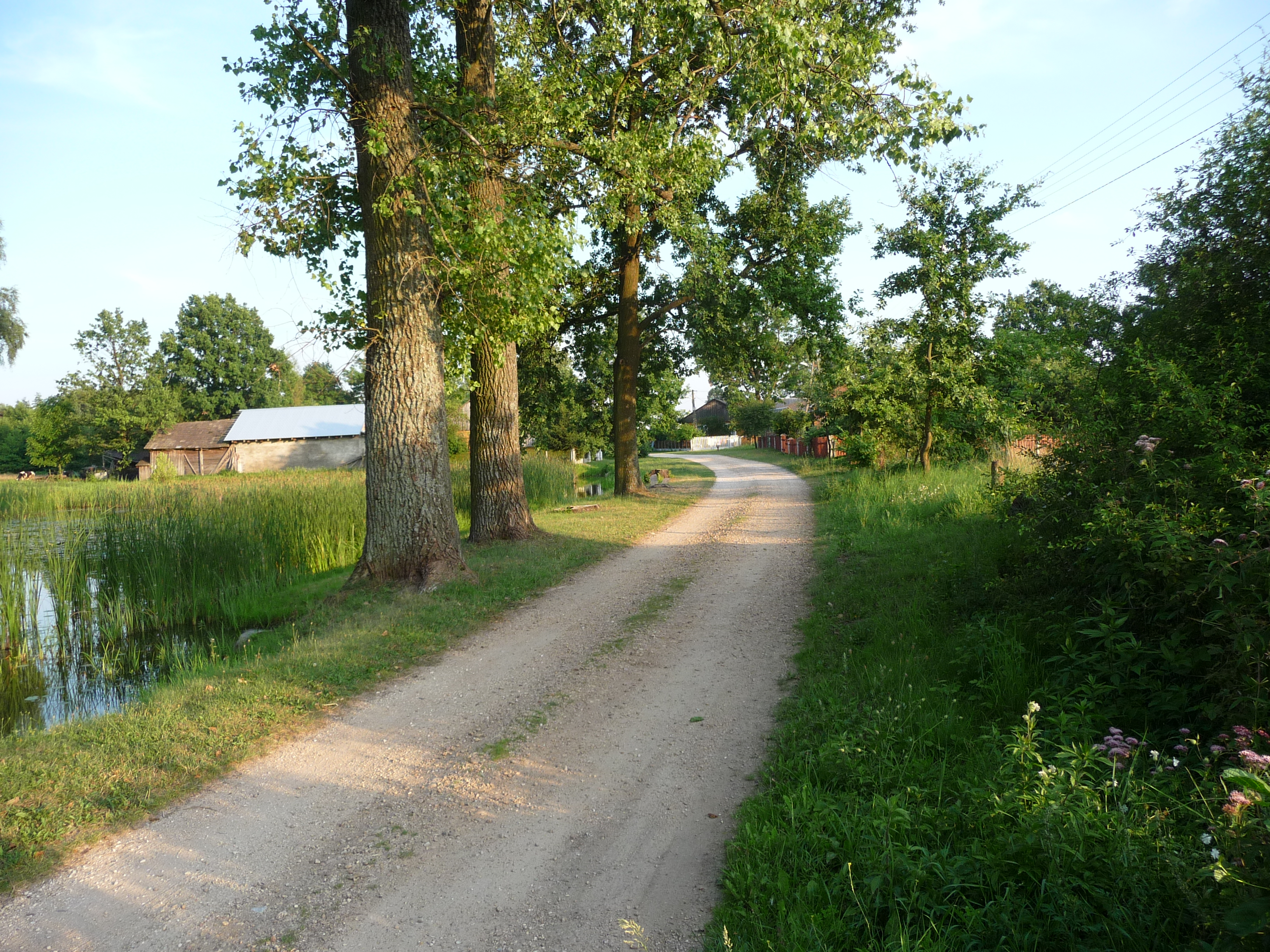

- Location within Poland
- Coordinates: 51°08′09″N 20°09′11″E
- Country: Poland
- Voivodeship: Świętokrzyskie
- County: Końskie
- Gmina: Fałków

Greszczyn [ˈɡrɛʂt͡ʂɨn] is a village in the administrative district of Gmina Fałków, within Końskie County, Świętokrzyskie Voivodeship, in south-central Poland.
