= Kamień-Słubice =

- Village
- Location within Poland
- Coordinates: 52°21′N 19°44′E
- Country: Poland
- Voivodeship: Masovian
- County: Płock
- Gmina: Gąbin
- Population: 117

Kamień-Słubice (Polish pronunciation: [ˈkamjɛj̃ swuˈbitsɛ]) is a village in the administrative district of Gmina Gąbin, within Płock County, Masovian Voivodeship, in east-central Poland.
