= Piaski, Płock County =

Piaski
- Village
- Location within Poland
- Coordinates: 52°26′N 19°49′E
- Country: Poland
- Voivodeship: Masovian
- County: Płock
- Gmina: Gąbin

Population
  - Total: 51
- Time zone: UTC+1 (CET)
  - Summer (DST): UTC+2 (CEST)
- Vehicle registration: WPL

Piaski (Polish pronunciation: [ˈpjaskʲi]) is a village in the administrative district of Gmina Gąbin, within Płock County, Masovian Voivodeship, in central Poland.
