= Olszamowice-Porąbka =

- Village
- Location within Poland
- Coordinates: 51°05′58″N 20°04′02″E
- Country: Poland
- Voivodeship: Świętokrzyskie
- County: Końskie
- Gmina: Fałków

Olszamowice-Porąbka [ɔlʂamɔˈvit͡sɛ pɔˈrɔmpka] is a village in the administrative district of Gmina Fałków, within Końskie County, Świętokrzyskie Voivodeship, in south-central Poland.
