= Smyków, Gmina Fałków =

Smyków
- Village
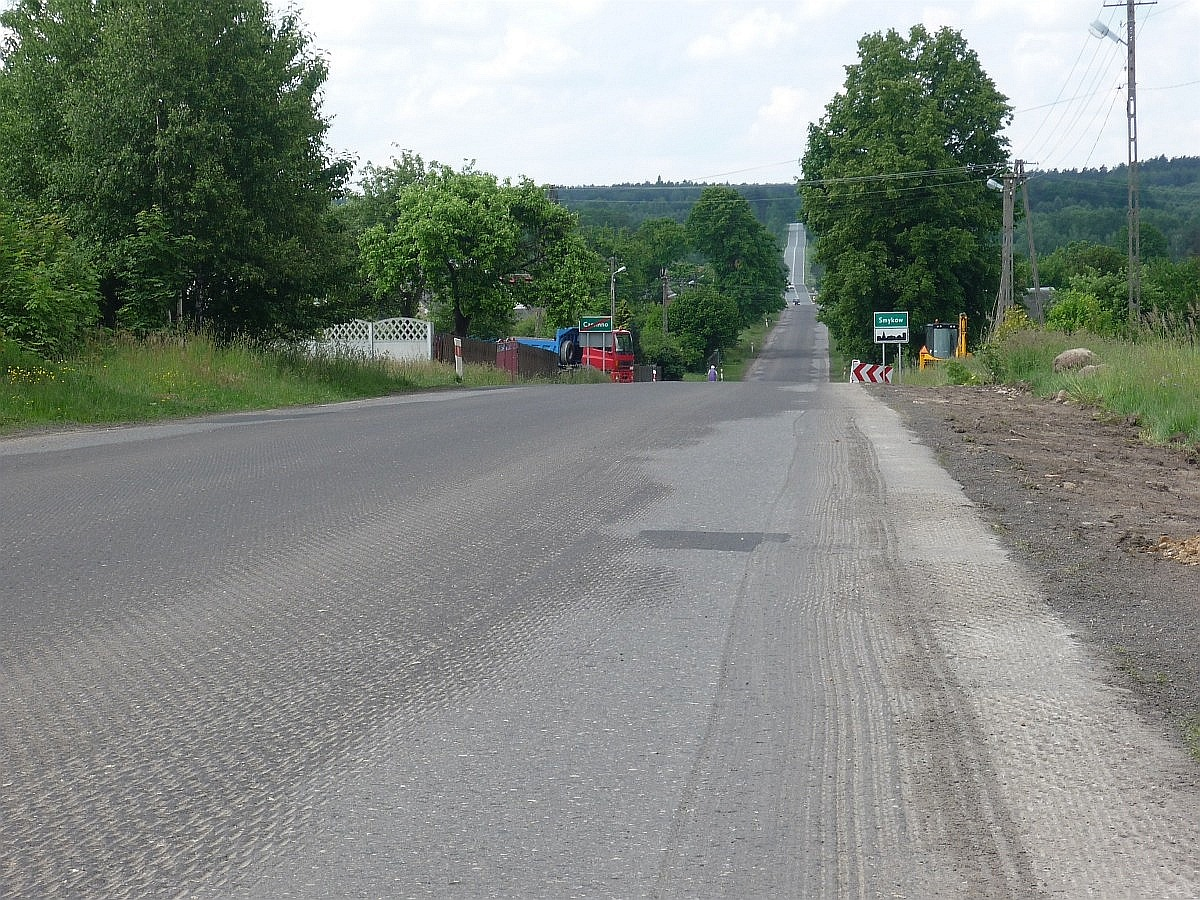

- Location within Poland
- Coordinates: 51°6′10″N 20°0′41″E
- Country: Poland
- Voivodeship: Świętokrzyskie
- County: Końskie
- Gmina: Fałków
- Population: 330

Smyków [ˈsmɨkuf] is a village in the administrative district of Gmina Fałków, within Końskie County, Świętokrzyskie Voivodeship, in south-central Poland. It lies approximately 8 km (5 mi) south-west of Fałków, 31 km (19 mi) west of Końskie, and 49 km (30 mi) north-west of the regional capital Kielce.
