= Nowy Kamień, Masovian Voivodeship =

Nowy Kamień
- Village
- Location within Poland
- Coordinates: 52°21′30″N 19°43′35″E
- Country: Poland
- Voivodeship: Masovian
- County: Płock
- Gmina: Gąbin
- Population: 167
- Time zone: UTC+1 (CET)
  - Summer (DST): UTC+2 (CEST)
- Vehicle registration: WPL

Nowy Kamień (Polish pronunciation: [ˈnɔvɨˈkamjɛj̃]) is a village in the administrative district of Gmina Gąbin, within Płock County, Masovian Voivodeship, in central Poland.
