= Strzemeszno =

- Village
- Location within Poland
- Coordinates: 52°25′N 19°48′E
- Country: Poland
- Voivodeship: Masovian
- County: Płock
- Gmina: Gąbin
- Population: 157
- Time zone: UTC+1 (CET)
  - Summer (DST): UTC+2 (CEST)
- Vehicle registration: WPL

Strzemeszno [stʂɛˈmɛʂnɔ] is a village in the administrative district of Gmina Gąbin, within Płock County, Masovian Voivodeship, in east-central Poland.

== History ==
Strzemeszno was a private village of Polish nobility, administratively located in the Rawa Voivodeship in the Greater Poland Province of the Polish Crown.

During the German occupation (World War II), the Germans murdered several Polish farmers from Strzemeszno in two massacres committed in the forests near Gąbin in 1939, and in October 1940 several Polish families were expelled and deported to forced labour to Germany, while their farms were handed over to German colonists as part of the Lebensraum policy.
