= Gmina Gąbin =

Gmina Gąbin Gąbin Commune
- Gmina
- Coat of arms
- Interactive map of Gmina Gąbin
- Coordinates (Gąbin): 52°24′N 19°44′E
- Country: Poland
- Voivodeship: Masovian
- County: Płock County
- Seat: Gąbin

Area
  - Total: 146.71 km^{2} (56.65 sq mi)

Population (2006)
  - Total: 10,858
  - Density: 74.010/km^{2} (191.68/sq mi)
  - Urban: 4,137
  - Rural: 6,721
- Time zone: UTC+1 (CET)
  - Summer (DST): UTC+2 (CEST)
- Vehicle registration: WPL
- Website: https://www.gabin.pl/

Gmina Gąbin is an urban-rural gmina (administrative district) in Płock County, Masovian Voivodeship, in central Poland. Its seat is the town of Gąbin, which lies approximately 17 kilometres (11 mi) south of Płock and 89 km (55 mi) west of Warsaw.

The gmina covers an area of 146.71 square kilometres (56.6 sq mi), and as of 2006 its total population is 10,858 (out of which the population of Gąbin amounts to 4,137, and the population of the rural part of the gmina is 6,721).

== Villages ==
Apart from the town of Gąbin, Gmina Gąbin contains the villages and settlements of Borki, Czermno, Dobrzyków, Górki, Góry Małe, Grabie Polskie, Guzew, Jadwigów, Jordanów, Kamień-Słubice, Karolew, Kępina, Konstantynów, Koszelew, Lipińskie, Ludwików, Nowa Korzeniówka, Nowe Grabie, Nowe Wymyśle, Nowy Kamień, Nowy Troszyn, Okolusz, Piaski, Plebanka, Potrzebna, Przemysłów, Rumunki, Stara Korzeniówka, Stary Kamień, Strzemeszno, Topólno and Troszyn Polski.

== Neighbouring gminas ==
Gmina Gąbin is bordered by the city of Płock and by the gminas of Łąck, Pacyna, Sanniki, Słubice, Słupno and Szczawin Kościelny.
