= Czermno Kolonia-Stomorgi =

- Village
- Location within Poland
- Coordinates: 51°07′07″N 20°02′05″E
- Country: Poland
- Voivodeship: Świętokrzyskie
- County: Końskie
- Gmina: Fałków

Czermno Kolonia-Stomorgi [ˈt͡ʂɛrmnɔ kɔˈlɔɲa stɔˈmɔrɡi] is a village in the administrative district of Gmina Fałków, within Końskie County, Świętokrzyskie Voivodeship, in south-central Poland.
