= Stary Kamień, Masovian Voivodeship =

Stary Kamień
- Village
- Location within Poland
- Coordinates: 52°22′N 19°43′E
- Country: Poland
- Voivodeship: Masovian
- County: Płock
- Gmina: Gąbin

Population
  - Total: 216
- Time zone: UTC+1 (CET)
  - Summer (DST): UTC+2 (CEST)
- Vehicle registration: WPL

Stary Kamień (Polish pronunciation: [ˈstarɨ ˈkamjɛj̃]) is a village in the administrative district of Gmina Gąbin, within Płock County, Masovian Voivodeship, in central Poland.
