= Zbójno, Świętokrzyskie Voivodeship =

Zbójno
- Village
- Location within Poland
- Coordinates: 51°9′7″N 20°8′17″E
- Country: Poland
- Voivodeship: Świętokrzyskie
- County: Końskie
- Gmina: Fałków
- Population: 180

Zbójno [ˈzbui̯nɔ] is a village in the administrative district of Gmina Fałków, within Końskie County, Świętokrzyskie Voivodeship, in south-central Poland. It lies approximately 4 km (2 mi) north-east of Fałków, 21 km (13 mi) west of Końskie, and 45 km (28 mi) north-west of the regional capital Kielce.
