= Česká Čermná =

- Municipality
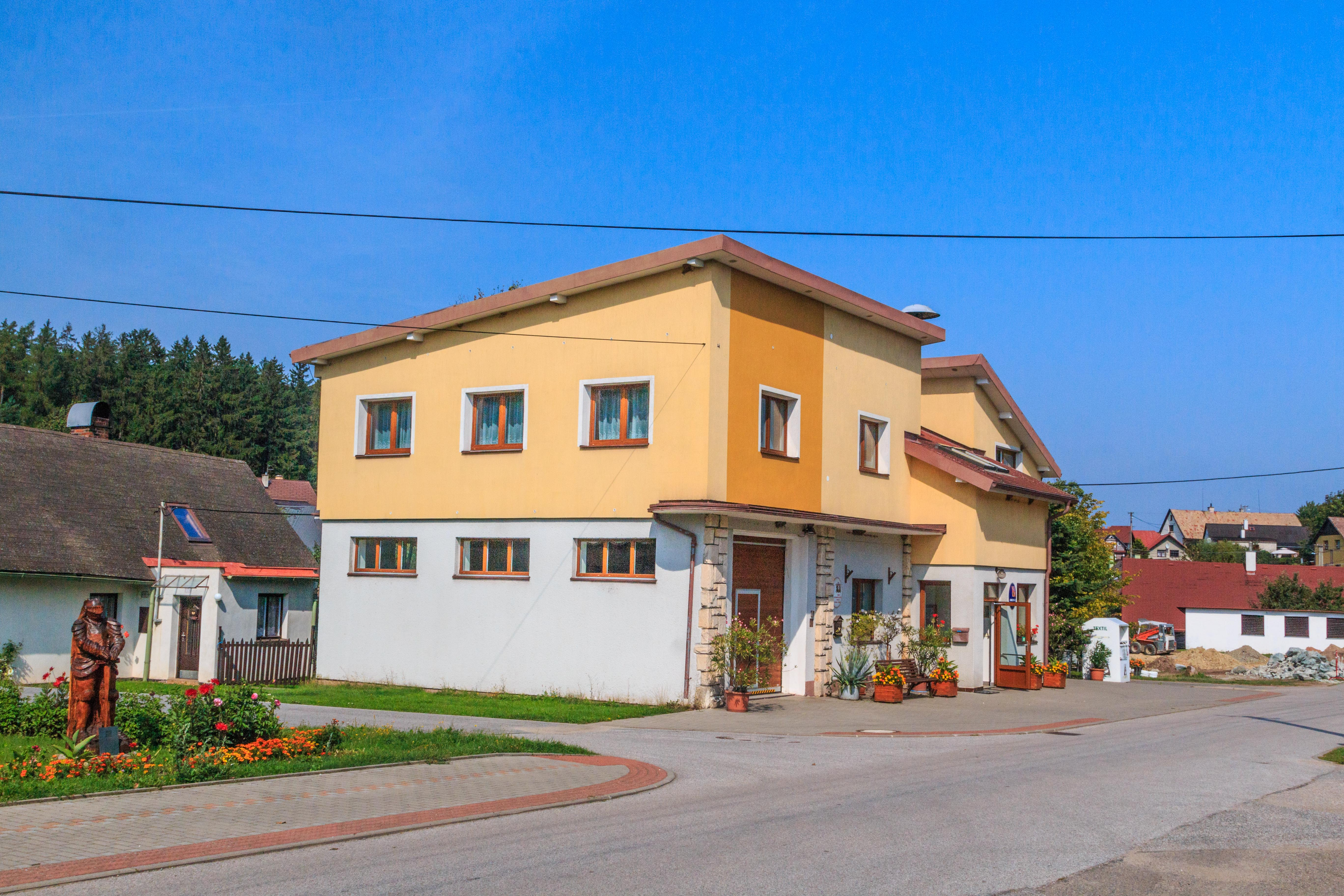
- Municipal office

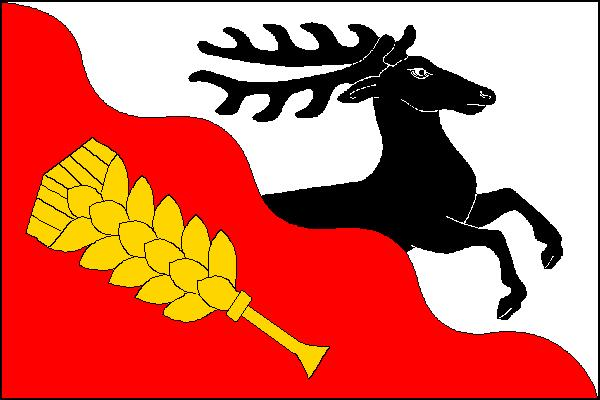
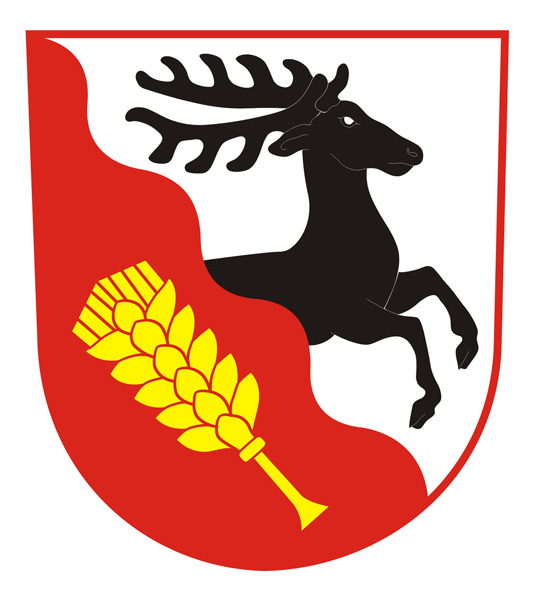
- Flag Coat of arms

- Location in the Czech Republic
- Coordinates: 50°24′3″N 16°13′46″E
- Country: Czech Republic
- Region: Hradec Králové
- District: Náchod
- First mentioned: 1448

Area
  - Total: 8.92 km^{2} (3.44 sq mi)
- Elevation: 520 m (1,710 ft)

Population (2026-01-01)
  - Total: 505
  - Density: 56.6/km^{2} (147/sq mi)
- Time zone: UTC+1 (CET)
  - Summer (DST): UTC+2 (CEST)
- Postal code: 549 21
- Website: www.ceskacermna.cz

Česká Čermná is a municipality and village in Náchod District in the Hradec Králové Region of the Czech Republic. It has about 500 inhabitants.

== Geography ==
Česká Čermná is located about 4 kilometres (2 mi) east of Náchod and 34 km (21 mi) northeast of Hradec Králové, on the border with Poland. It lies in the Orlické Foothills. The highest point is the hill Kašparka at 639 m (2,096 ft) above sea level.

== History ==
The first written mention of Česká Čermná is from 1448. Until 1849, it belonged to the Náchod estate and shared its owners.

== Demographics ==
Historical population

Year	Pop.	±%
1869	689	—
1880	690	+0.1%
1890	723	+4.8%
1900	644	−10.9%
1910	674	+4.7%

Year	Pop.	±%
1921	624	−7.4%
1930	530	−15.1%
1950	449	−15.3%
1961	470	+4.7%
1970	453	−3.6%

Year	Pop.	±%
1980	423	−6.6%
1991	431	+1.9%
2001	437	+1.4%
2011	447	+2.3%
2021	465	+4.0%

Source: Censuses

== Transport ==
On the Czech–Polish border is the Česká Čermná / Brzozowie road border crossing.

== Sights ==
There are no protected cultural monuments in the municipality. The main cultural landmark of Česká Čermná is the Chapel of Saint Wenceslaus. It is a modern chapel, built in 1938–1939.
