= Czermno, Masovian Voivodeship =

Czermno
- Village
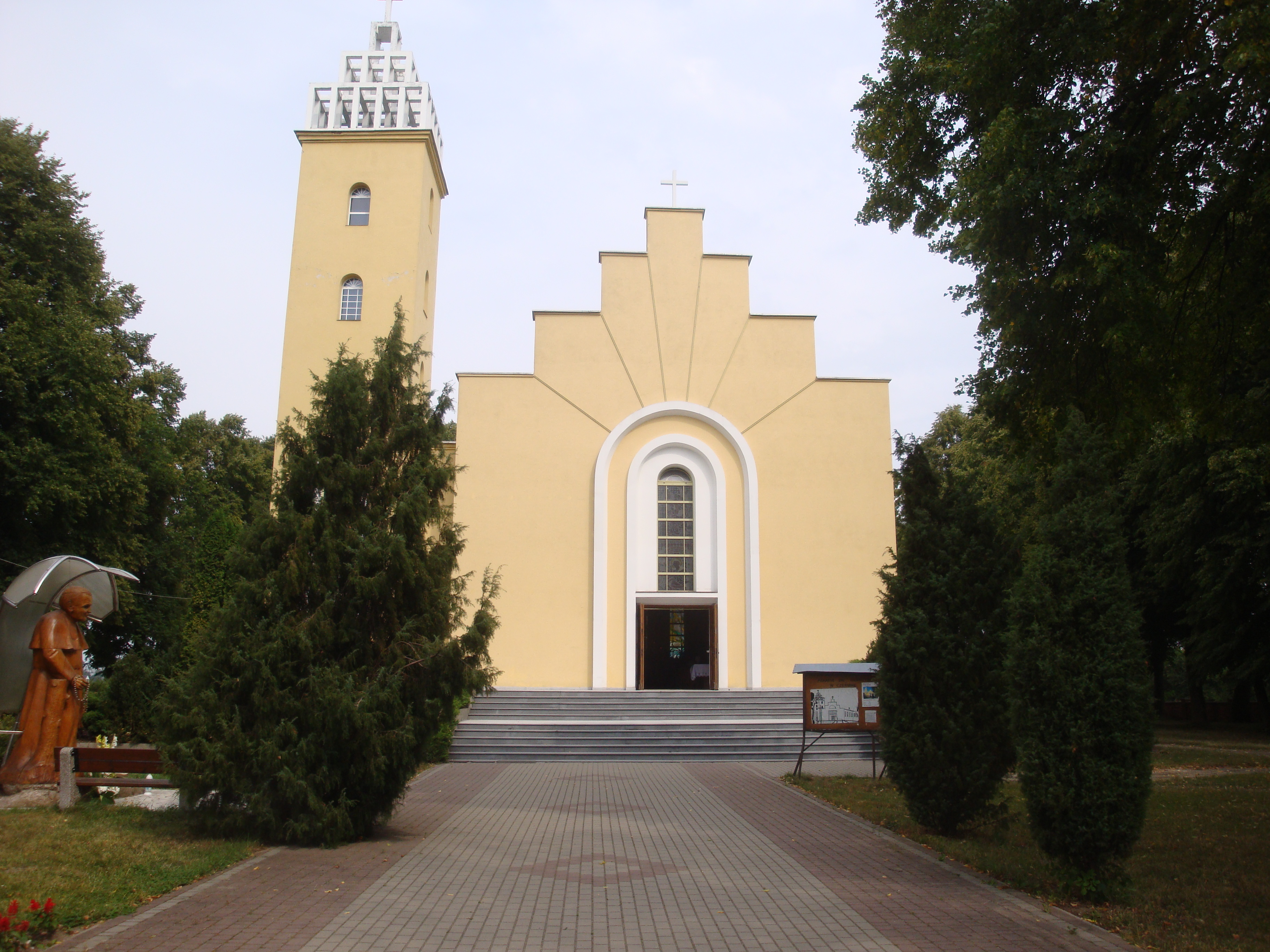
- Saint Lawrence church in Czermno

- Location within Poland
- Coordinates: 52°24′N 19°47′E
- Country: Poland
- Voivodeship: Masovian
- County: Płock
- Gmina: Gąbin
- Population: 477
- Time zone: UTC+1 (CET)
  - Summer (DST): UTC+2 (CEST)
- Vehicle registration: WPL
- Website: http://www.czermno.ovh.org/www.czermno/

Czermno [ˈt͡ʂɛrmnɔ] is a village in the administrative district of Gmina Gąbin, within Płock County, Masovian Voivodeship, in east-central Poland.

== History ==
Czermno was a royal village of the Polish Crown, administratively located in the Rawa Voivodeship in the Greater Poland Province of the Polish Crown.

During the German occupation (World War II), farmers from Czermno were among six Polish farmers murdered by the Germans in November 1939 in the forest near Gąbin (see Nazi crimes against the Polish nation).
