= Čermná (Trutnov District) =

- Municipality
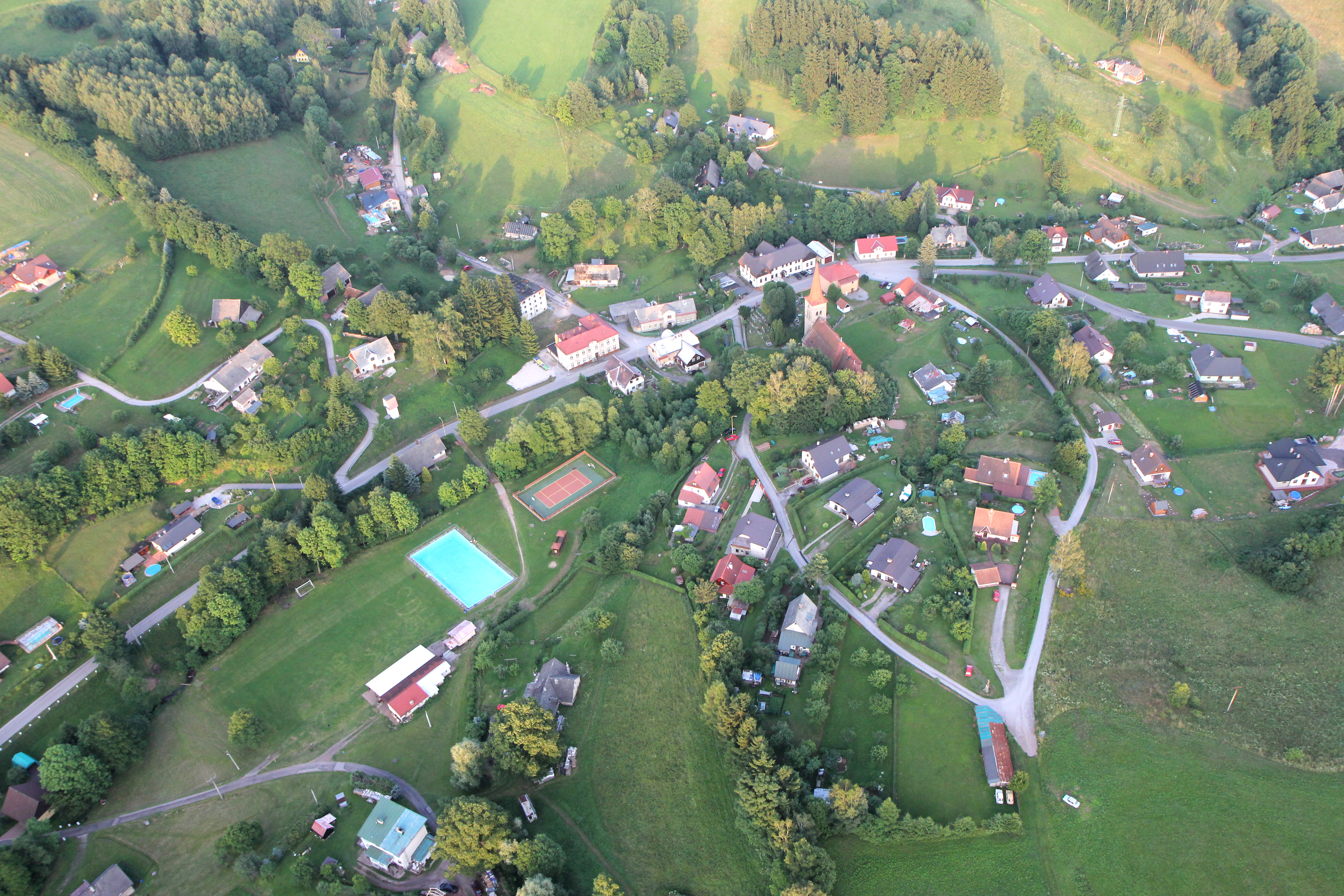
- Aerial view

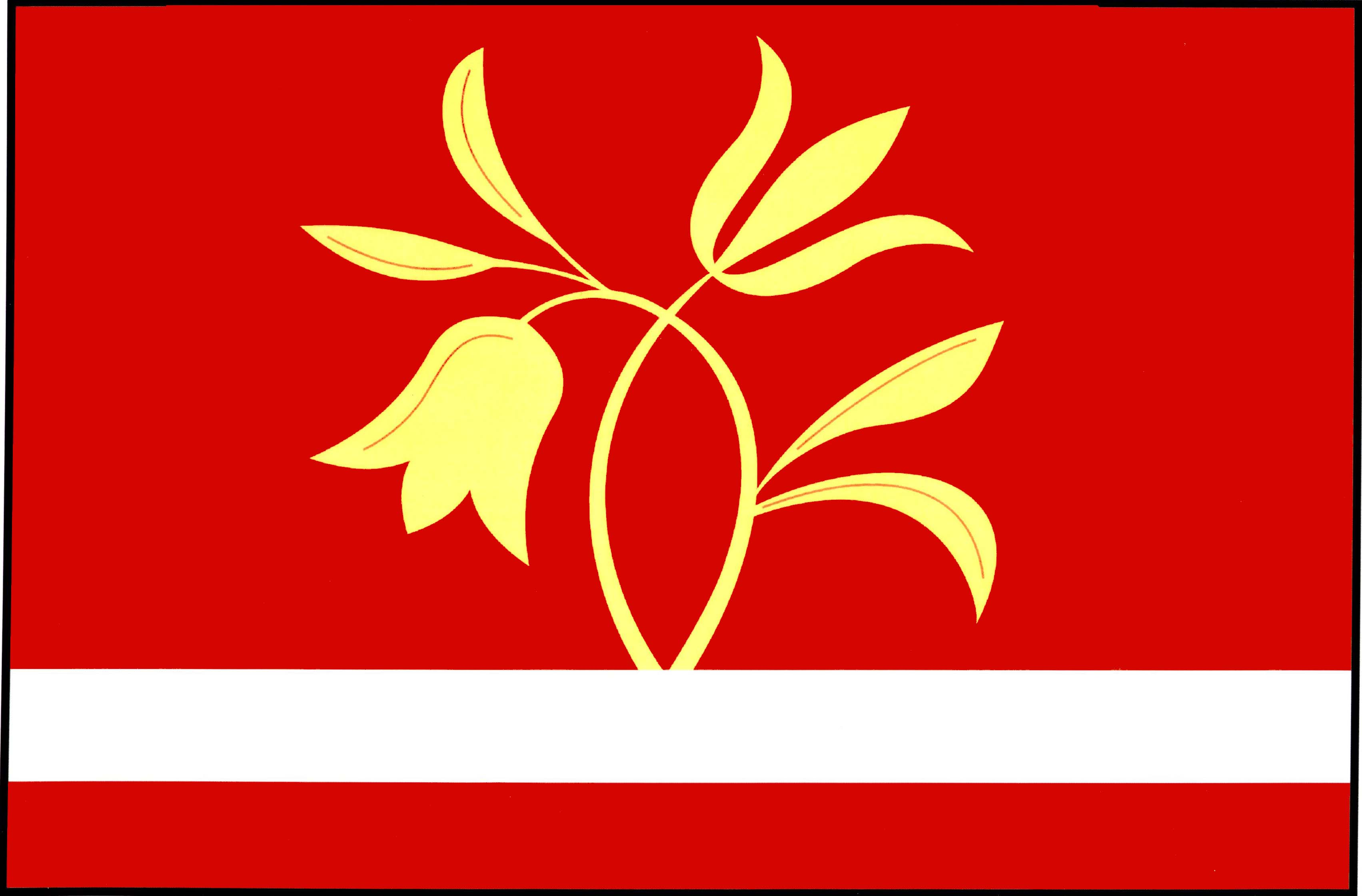
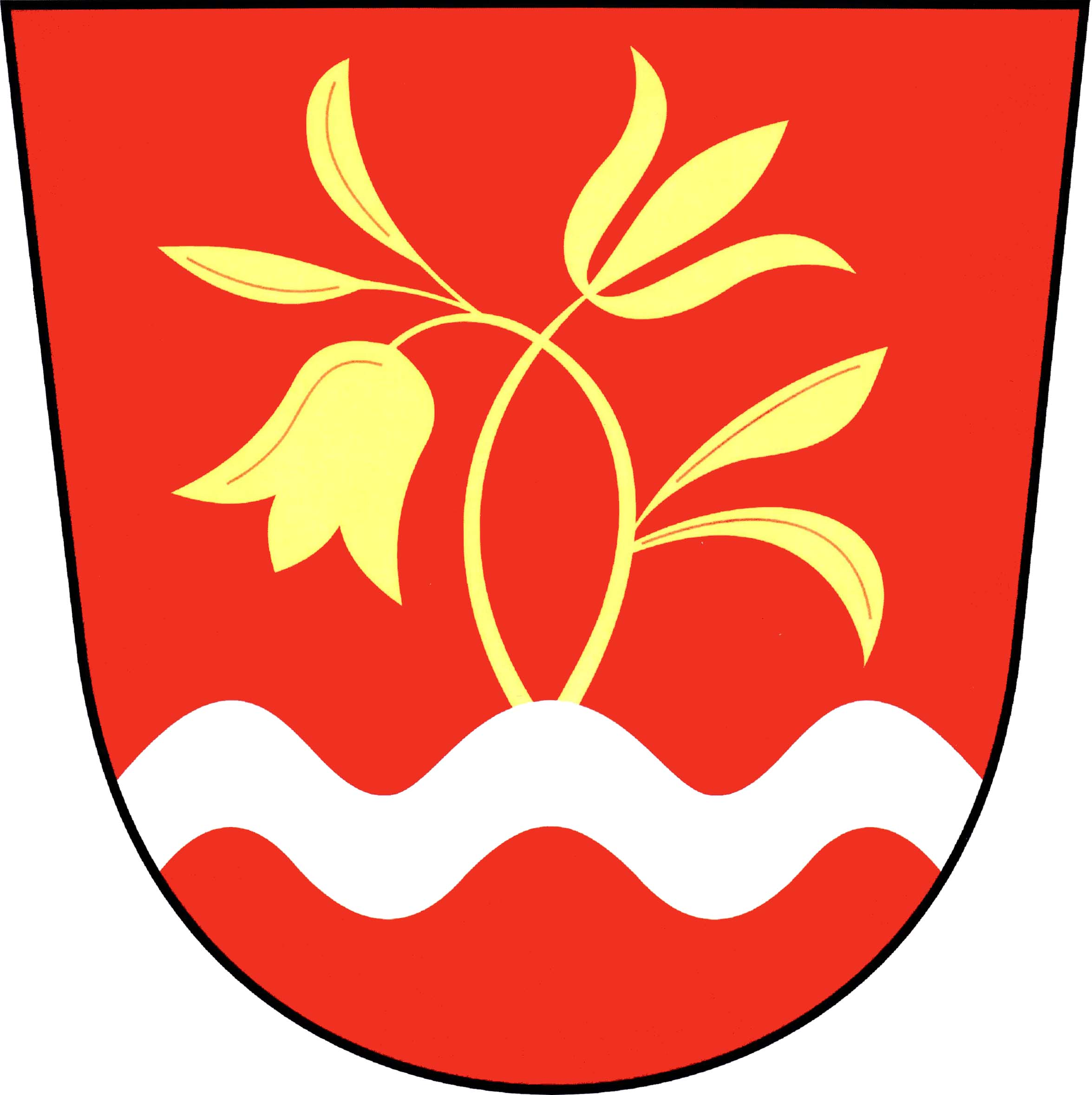
- Flag Coat of arms

- Location in the Czech Republic
- Coordinates: 50°33′0″N 15°46′11″E
- Country: Czech Republic
- Region: Hradec Králové
- District: Trutnov
- First mentioned: 1362

Area
  - Total: 9.32 km^{2} (3.60 sq mi)
- Elevation: 387 m (1,270 ft)

Population (2026-01-01)
  - Total: 427
  - Density: 45.8/km^{2} (119/sq mi)
- Time zone: UTC+1 (CET)
  - Summer (DST): UTC+2 (CEST)
- Postal code: 543 77
- Website: www.obec-cermna.cz

Čermná is a municipality and village in Trutnov District in the Hradec Králové Region of the Czech Republic. It has about 400 inhabitants.

== Demographics ==
Historical population
Year	Pop.	±%
1869	1,108	—
1880	1,100	−0.7%
1890	1,080	−1.8%
1900	1,089	+0.8%
1910	1,119	+2.8%
1921	1,001	−10.5%
1930	1,038	+3.7%
1950	632	−39.1%
1961	580	−8.2%
1970	453	−21.9%
1980	414	−8.6%
1991	357	−13.8%
2001	370	+3.6%
2011	376	+1.6%
2021	397	+5.6%
Source: Censuses
