= Gąbin =

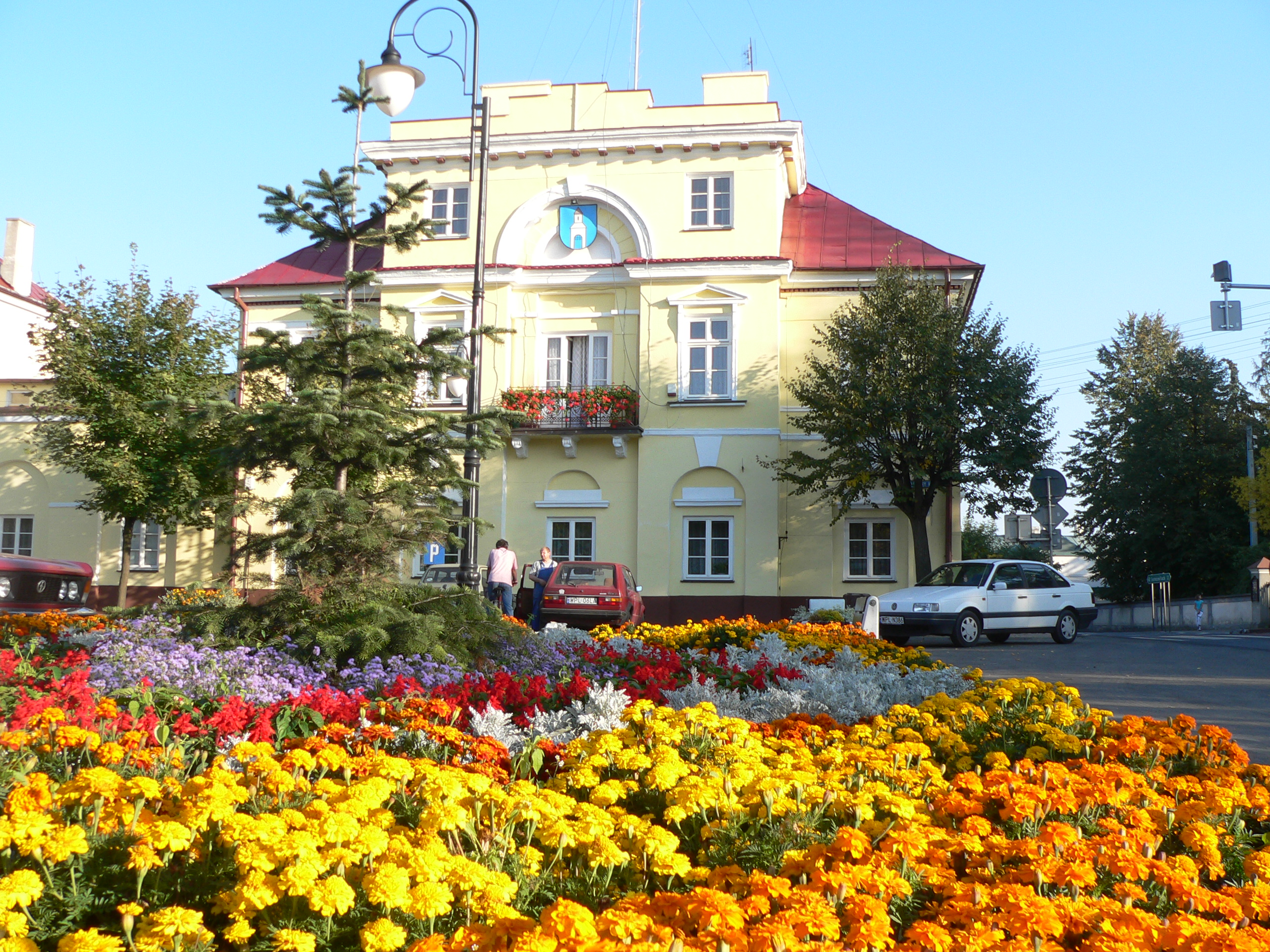
- Town Hall

- Coat of arms

- Location within Poland
- Coordinates: 52°24′N 19°44′E
- Country: Poland
- Voivodeship: Masovian
- County: Płock
- Gmina: Gąbin
- First mentioned: 1215
- Town rights: before 1437

Government
  - Mayor: Krzysztof Mieczysław Jadczak

Area
  - Total: 28.16 km^{2} (10.87 sq mi)

Population (31 December 2021)
  - Total: 4,065
  - Density: 144.4/km^{2} (373.9/sq mi)
- Time zone: UTC+1 (CET)
  - Summer (DST): UTC+2 (CEST)
- Postal code: 09-530
- Area code: +48 24
- Car plates: WPL
- Website: gabin.pl

Gąbin [ˈɡɔmbin] is a small town in Płock County, Masovian Voivodeship, Poland, with 4,065 inhabitants as of December 2021. The Warsaw radio mast, which stood near Gąbin, was the tallest structure in the world until its collapse in 1991. It remained the highest structure ever created until 2010.

== History ==
Gąbin was first mentioned in 1215, but a gord-type settlement existed here long before that date, as in 1920, a coin minted by first Polish King Boleslaus I the Brave was found in the market square. Gąbin probably received town charter in 1322, or perhaps earlier; in 1437 the charter was confirmed and expanded. Until the mid-15th century, it was part of the Duchy of Mazovia, and in 1462, it became seat of the Gostynin Land, in what was then Rawa Voivodeship. It was a royal town of the Polish Crown. In the period known as Polish Golden Age, Gąbin was renowned for its cloth makers, it also was the seat of a starosta. Local merchants traded with the main Polish port city of Gdańsk, to which they sold grain, and from which they bought salt, fish, and foreign liquor. In the late 15th century the local parish priest was Maciej Drzewicki, the future archbishop of Gniezno and Primate of Poland.

The period of prosperity ended during the Swedish invasion of Poland (1655–1660), when Gąbin was ransacked and burned to the ground, and Great Northern War (1700–1721). The revival of the local economy took place in the second half of the 18th century during the reign of King Stanislaus Augustus.

In 1793 the town was annexed by Prussia in the Second Partition of Poland. In 1807 it was regained by Poles and included in the short-lived Duchy of Warsaw, and in 1815 it became part of so-called Congress Poland, soon forcibly integrated into Russia. On the initiative of Stanisław Staszic, a weaver settlement was founded in Gąbin in the 1820s, and a number of German artisans settled here. The Polish November Uprising against Russia (1830–1831), in which many local Poles took part, caused an economic collapse, as the Russian army plundered farms and brought the cholera epidemic to the town. Poles also took part in the January Uprising (1863–1864), which resulted in harsh Anti-Polish repressions from the Imperial Russian authorities. Further economic development was halted in the late 19th century, due to proximity of quickly developing industrial town of Żyrardów. During World War I, from 1915 to 1918, Gąbin was occupied by Germany, and afterwards, in 1918, Poland regained independence and the town was reintegrated with Polish territory.

=== World War II ===
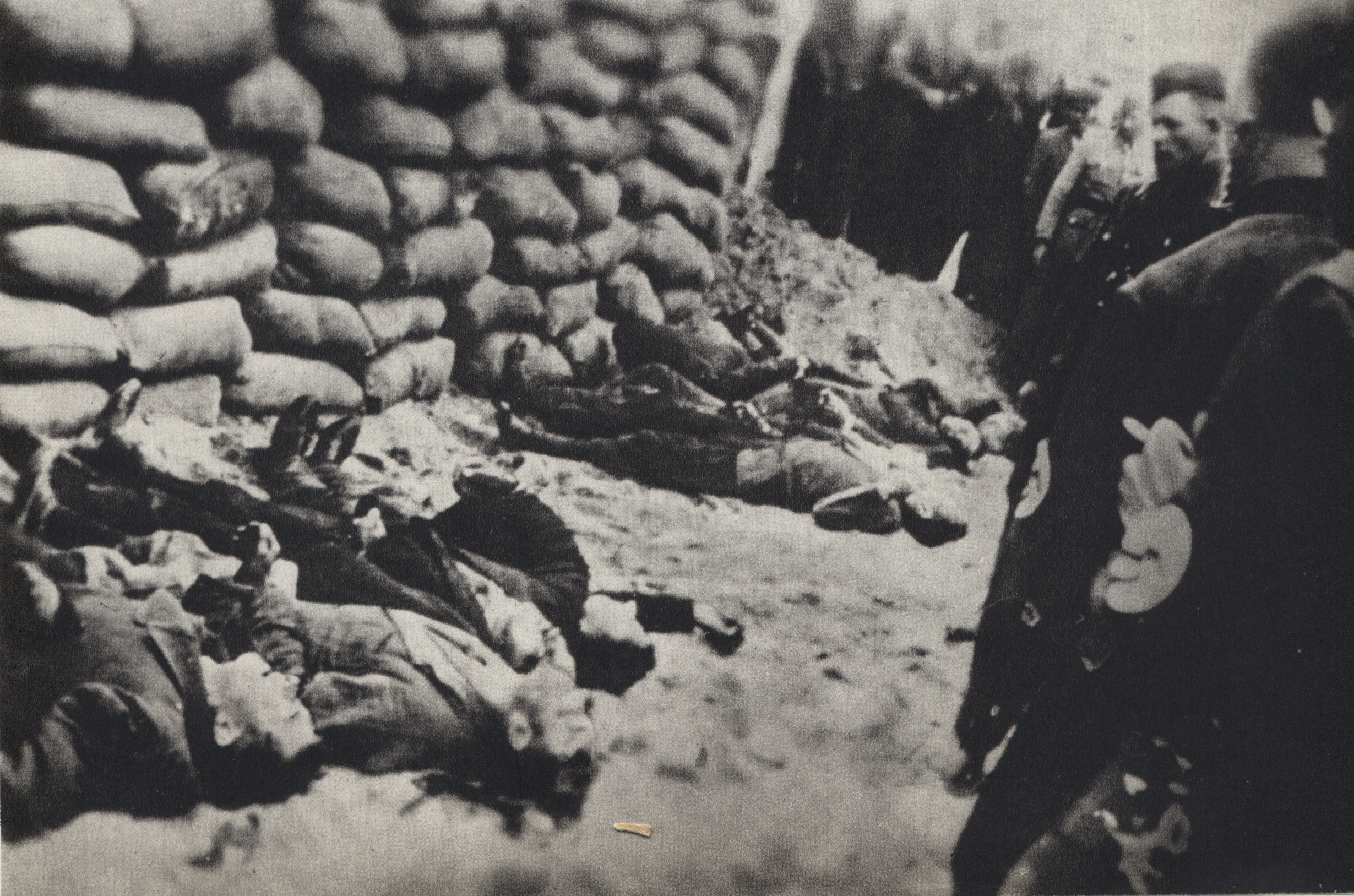
Public execution of Poles, carried out by the Germans on June 15, 1941

During the invasion of Poland, which started World War II, in September 1939, Gąbin was raided by Germany. Eugenia Sikorska-Dąbrowska, sister of Polish wartime leader Władysław Sikorski, was fatally shot by the Germans, while she was saving children. German troops entered the town on September 17, 1939, and the German occupation began.

The Polish population was subjected to various atrocities. Germans immediately carried out mass arrests of local Polish intelligentsia, activists and officials, who were deported to the Mauthausen concentration camp and murdered there. Germans also carried out massacres of Poles in Gąbin itself, notable examples include an execution of 20 Polish refugees from Pomerania on September 19–21, 1939, an execution of six farmers from nearby villages of Czermno and Strzemeszno in the Gąbin forest in November 1939, a public execution of 10 Poles near the local church on June 15, 1941. Expulsions of Poles and deportations of mostly young Poles to forced labour to Germany were carried out throughout the war. The Germans also burned down the local synagogue, dismantled the Gothic Revival church, which was erected shortly before the war, and destroyed the Polish Tomb of the Unknown Soldier. Despite such circumstances, the Polish underground resistance movement was active in the town. Many Poles from Gąbin were also among the victims of the Katyń massacre.

=== History of the Jewish community ===
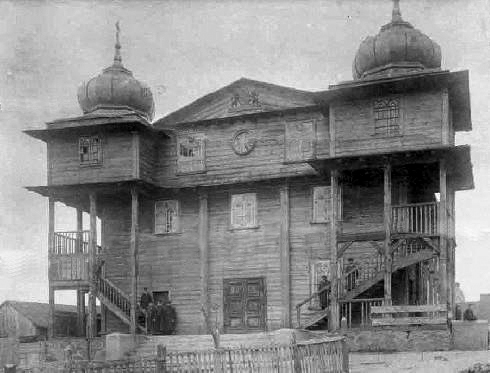
Synagogue, destroyed by the Germans during World War II. Photo taken in 1833

From its earliest days, Gąbin was a town of craftsmen of various trades, and its population contained a sizeable number of Jews. Competition and conflict between Jewish and the non-Jewish tradesmen is noted as early as 1576 when Sigismund III issued a decree prohibiting Jews from buying leather from the local peasants, allowing them to purchase leather only at the town market after completion of the morning mass at the town’s Catholic church. In 1582, a decree from king Stephen Báthory further prevented Jews from buying hides and tallow in the town or its vicinity. During subsequent years, Jews were harassed at times, and forced to live in designated parts of the town, called the “quarter.”

Jews generally represented approximately half the population of the town. For example, in 1808, the town’s population consisted of 577 Jews out of a total population of 1,183. The census of 1827 counted 1,472 Jews out of a total population of 2,926. After World War I the 1921 census showed that of the total population of the town, at 5,777, there were 2,564 Jews living in the town.

Before the onset of World War II, Gąbin was home to a large Jewish population, around 2,000 residents, and hosted an ornate wooden synagogue from the early 1700s. On September 7, 1939, Gąbin was occupied by the invading German Army, which burned down the wooden synagogue and rounded up the town’s Jewish population to dig trenches for protection against the Polish Army. In 1940, German police and SS murdered many Jews and tortured many others. In 1941, the Germans placed the Jewish population in a ghetto, and in 1942 about 500 were sent to forced labour camps. Later that year, the Germans rounded up the remaining hundreds of Jews and sent them to the Chełmno extermination camp where they were immediately gassed. At war’s end, of the approximately 2,300 Jews that had resided in Gąbin (including about 250 sent there during the war, only about 212 survived, 180 having escaped to the Soviet occupied zone of Poland in September 1939, and 32 fleeing into the Polish countryside.

The Jewish history of Gąbin was memorialized in Minna Packer's acclaimed documentary film Back To Gombin (2002) as seen on United States and Israeli television, and in numerous international film festivals. Gombin is the name for the town in both Yiddish and German. The film is distributed by the National Center for Jewish Film.

=== Post-war Poland ===
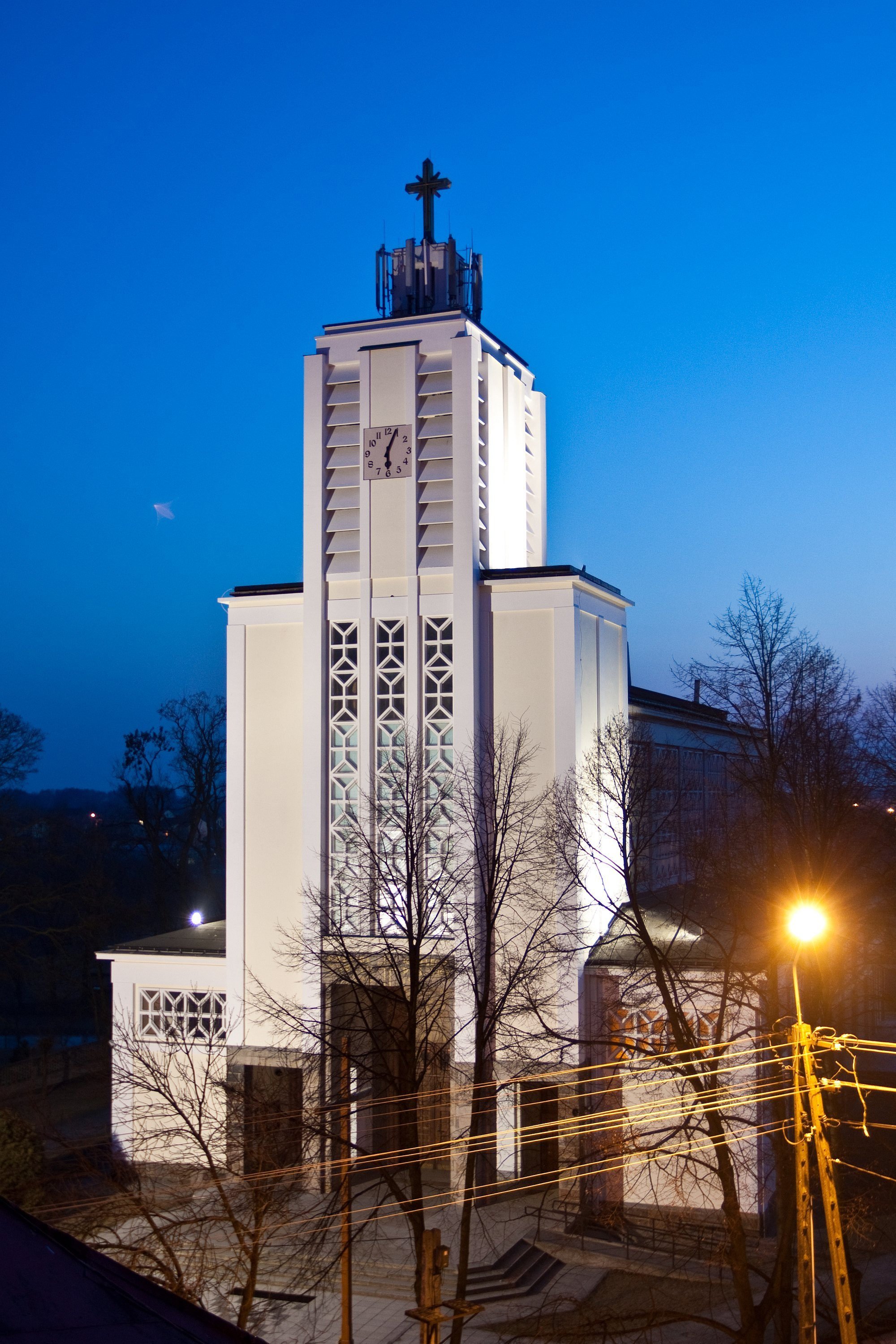
Saint Nicholas Church

The anti-communist resistance was active in the town. Between 1974 and 1991 the Warsaw radio mast in Konstantynów, a village belonging to Gąbin commune (gmina) was the tallest structure on earth. The tower was used to broadcast the programs of Polish Radio throughout Europe. Because of fears that the tower's incredibly powerful radio waves might cause health problems, a large number of villagers who had once farmed the land directly under and around the tower were migrated to a block-style apartment building in the center of Gąbin, where many still reside today. The town has experienced a remarkable renaissance since the Revolutions of 1989.

== Education ==
Gąbin is home to a large high school of over 1,000 students with specialties in modern farming techniques, technical skills, and preparation for higher education. The school has been home to Peace Corps volunteers and has promoted foreign exchange visits with peers from Germany, Russia, and other countries.

== Churches ==
Churches that support the local Catholic population include:

- Saint Nicholas, ul. Warszawska 4, Gąbin, 09-530 PL

== Transport ==
Voivodeship 574 passes right through Gąbin, whilst voivodeship road 577 bypasses Gąbin to the south.

The nearest railway station is in Płock.

== Special events ==
- Gąbin Tower Memorial Festival

== Sports ==
The local football team is Błękitni Gąbin. It competes in the lower leagues.

== Notable residents ==
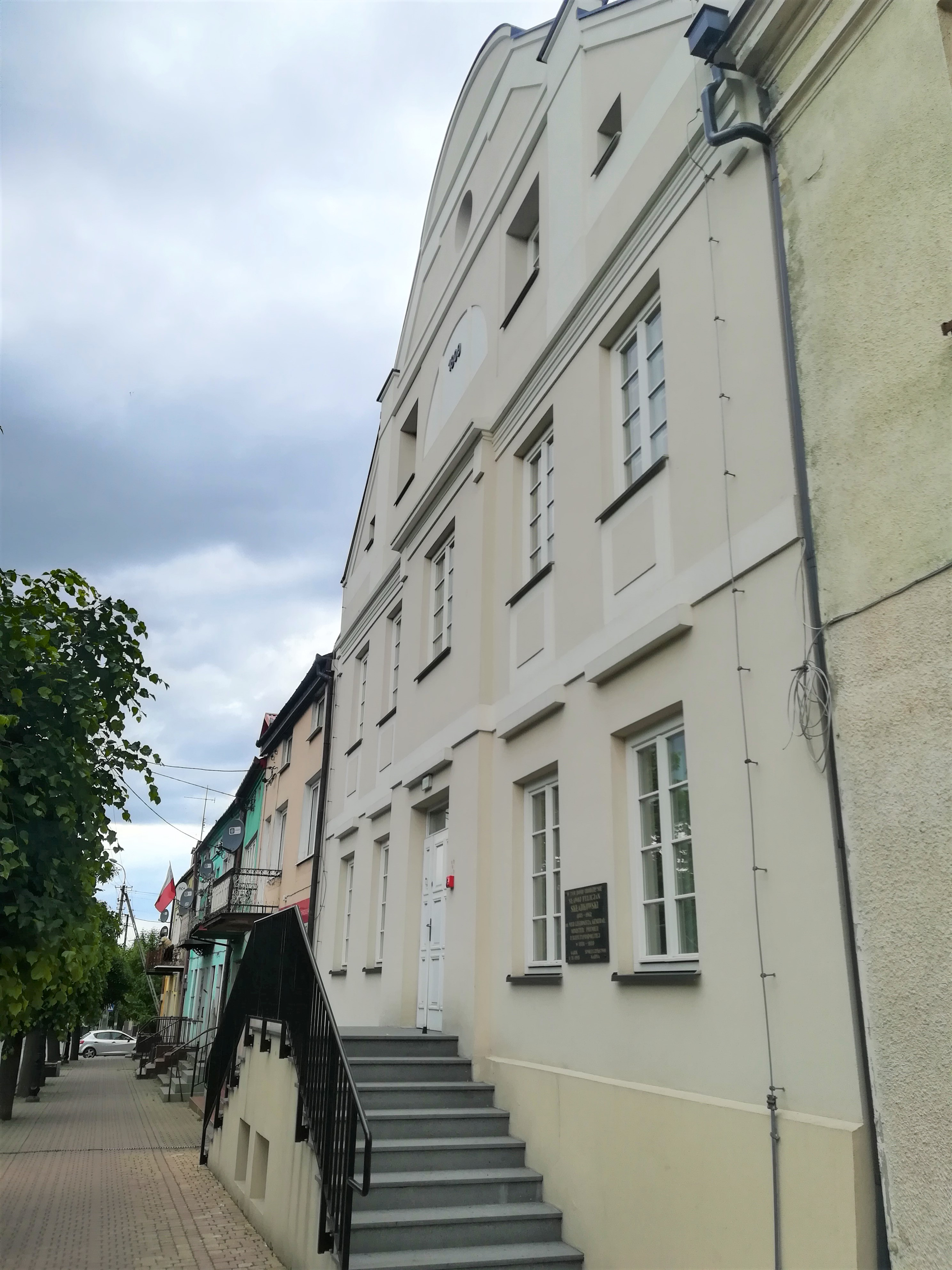
Birthplace of Felicjan Sławoj Składkowski, now a museum

- Abraham Abele Gombiner (c. 1635–5 October 1682), Rabbi and author of "Magen Avraham"
- Michał Pietrzak (b. 1943), Polish lawyer and academic teacher
- Felicjan Sławoj Składkowski (1885–1962), Polish physician, general, politician, Prime Minister of Poland in 1936–1939
- Rajzel Żychlińsky (1910–2001), Polish-American writer of poetry in Yiddish, who was born in Gąbin in 1910 and attended grade school there, escaped to the Soviet-occupied part of Poland in September 1939
