= Fałków =

- Village
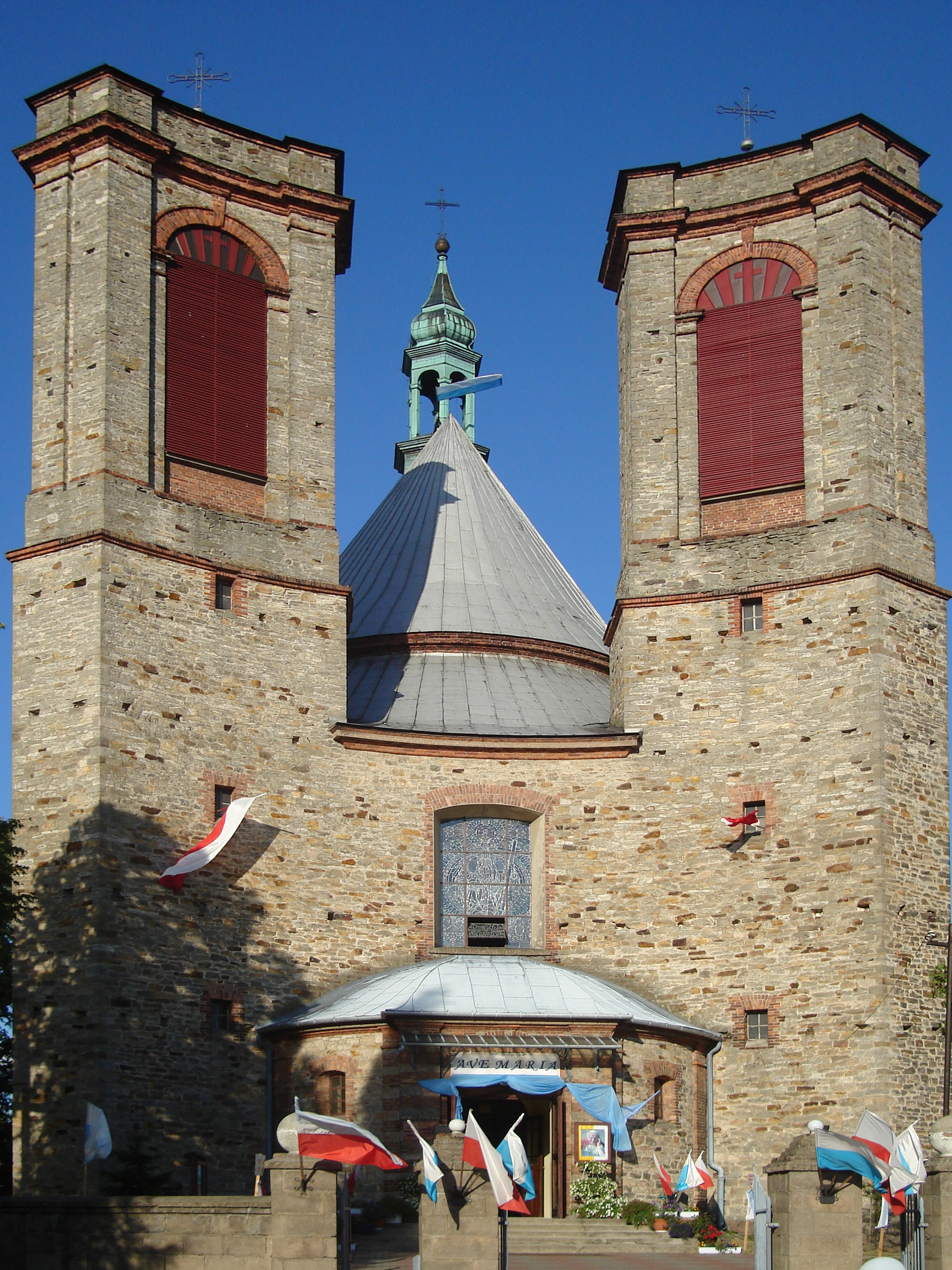

- Coat of arms

- Location within Poland
- Coordinates: 51°8′5″N 20°6′8″E
- Country: Poland
- Voivodeship: Świętokrzyskie
- County: Końskie
- Gmina: Fałków
- Population: 1,100

Fałków [ˈfau̯kuf] is a village in Końskie County, Świętokrzyskie Voivodeship, in south-central Poland. It is the seat of the gmina (administrative district) called Gmina Fałków. It lies in the northwestern corner of historic Lesser Poland, approximately 24 km (15 mi) west of Końskie and 46 km (29 mi) north-west of the regional capital Kielce. In 2006 the village had a population of 1,100.

Fałków had the status of a town from 1340 to 1869, when, like many other former towns in Poland, it lost that status after the January Uprising.

The history of the village dates back to the 13th century, when it belonged to the influential Odrowaz family. Some time in the first half of the 14th century, the family changed its name to Falkowski, and in 1340, King Kazimierz Wielki allowed Jakub and Piotr Falkowski to turn the village into a town, based on the Magdeburg rights. In the Kingdom of Poland and the Polish–Lithuanian Commonwealth, Fałków belonged to the County of Opoczno, Sandomierz Voivodeship. The town had several owners, and remained very small, with population of as little as 140 (as for 1662).

After the Partitions of Poland, Fałków in 1815 became part of the Russian-controlled Congress Poland. In the early 19th century, a blast furnace was opened here, as the village was located in the Old-Polish Industrial Region. Following the January Uprising, Fałków lost its town charter (1869). During World War I, the village together with its ancient church was destroyed. Fałków has ruins of a 17th-century defensive manor house, which was destroyed shortly after completion, during the Swedish invasion of Poland.
