= Jakimowice =

- Village
- Location within Poland
- Coordinates: 51°3′45″N 20°11′58″E
- Country: Poland
- Voivodeship: Świętokrzyskie
- County: Końskie
- Gmina: Radoszyce
- Population: 530
- Website: http://www.jakimowice.oz.pl

Jakimowice [jakimɔˈvit͡sɛ] is a village in the administrative district of Gmina Radoszyce, within Końskie County, Świętokrzyskie Voivodeship, in south-central Poland. It lies approximately 5 km (3 mi) west of Radoszyce, 22 km (14 mi) south-west of Końskie, and 36 km (22 mi) north-west of the regional capital Kielce.

== History ==
The first records of the village date back to 1411, where the village's existence was recorded by Jan Długosz, a Polish priest and historian. The village belonged to the Jakimowski family, after whom the village is named. An important moment in the village's history was in 1794, where the final insurgical units by chief Tomasz Wawrzecki were dissolved. In the 17th century, Jakimowice had strong trade links with neighbouring villages Zychy, Mnin, Pijanów, Radoszyce, and the regional capital, Kielce. The main items traded were wheat, apples, oats, and potatoes. There used to be several farms in Jakimowice and the surrounding area, but recently there have been fewer.

== Geography ==
=== Climate ===
The climate in Jakimowice is typical of Central Europe, with cool winters and warm summers. The warmest month is July, at 18 °C (64.4 °F), and the coldest is January, at −8 °C (17.6 °F). Snow is common throughout the winter months.

=== Terrain ===
Jakimowice has an elevation of approximately 248.4 m (814.8 ft) above sea level. The terrain around the village is mostly flat, with woodland in some areas.

== Infrastructure ==
The mayor of Radoszyce, Michał Pękala invested in a new water reservoir, walking paths, benches, and a children's playground. Construction was completed in March 2025. Currently, the town has one small convenience store, a Catholic church, tyre shop, fire station, and a factory outlet shop. Residents tend to travel to the neighbouring town of Radoszyce for larger shopping trips.
