= Radoszyce =

Radoszyce or Radoshitz may refer to:

- Radoszyce, Lower Silesian Voivodeship (south-west Poland)
- Radoszyce, Podkarpackie Voivodeship (south-east Poland)
- Radoszyce, Świętokrzyskie Voivodeship (south-central Poland)
  - Gmina Radoszyce, Końskie County, Świętokrzyskie Voivodeship, in south-central Poland
- Radoshitz (Hasidic dynasty)
