= Zychy =

- Village
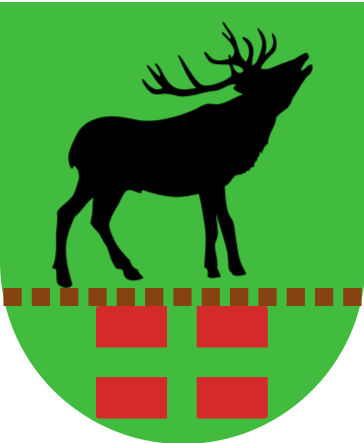

- Location within Poland
- Coordinates: 51°6′1″N 20°14′55″E
- Country: Poland
- Voivodeship: Świętokrzyskie
- County: Końskie
- Gmina: Radoszyce
- Elevation: 222.3 m (729 ft)
- Population: 111

Zychy [ˈzɨxɨ] is a village in the administrative district of Gmina Radoszyce, within Końskie County, Świętokrzyskie Voivodeship, in south-central Poland. It lies approximately 3 km (2 mi) north of Radoszyce, 17 km (11 mi) south-west of Końskie, and 36 km (22 mi) north-west of the regional capital Kielce.

== Etymology ==
The name "Zychy" is most likely of Slavic origin. It is believed to have derived from Old Polish, where Zych was a common family surname. The "y" suffix of the village name makes the village plural. Therefore, the village name translates to "the settlement of the Zych family".

== History ==
=== Piast Dynasty period ===
According to local legend, Bolesław II The Bold, King of Poland from 1076 to 1079, travelled through the village of Zychy whilst on a trip to Kielce, stopped by in the village of Zychy, sat by the river Kozówka to rest, watched the birds, and fell asleep. It is believed that in a dream he was caught in a thunderstorm and a voice spoke to him, commanding him to form a civilisation there. According to the legend, Bolesław II The Bold returned to the river again to appreciate its beauty. To commemorate his visit, the locals engraved his name on a bench in the exact location where Bolesław II The Bold would sit to rest.

=== Jagiellonian Dynasty ===
According to local legend, the origins of the village link closely to the neighbouring village of Wisy. The history of Zychy and Wisy is closely linked to a long-standing rivalry between two noble families in the Świętokrzyskie region during the late Middle Ages. Local records suggest that the Zych family, a minor szlachta (noble) clan, established the first permanent settlement in the area in the 15th century, having relocated from a nearby village. Within a generation, their rivals, the Wis family, founded a neighbouring settlement only a few kilometres away.

The rivalry appears to have been rooted in land disputes and inheritance claims. Court registers from the Sandomierz region mention a series of lawsuits in the 16th and 17th centuries concerning ownership of fields, mills, and grazing rights along the Kozówka River. Local tradition states that these quarrels occasionally escalated into skirmishes between villagers loyal to each family, though no large-scale violence is documented.

Despite tensions, both families contributed to the economic and cultural development of the region. The Zyches are credited with sponsoring a small wooden chapel in Zychy in the 1620s, while the Wises financed the construction of a watermill that supported local agriculture. By the 18th century, the rivalry had largely subsided as both families intermarried with other noble houses, and the two villages came to coexist more peacefully.

Today, traces of the rivalry survive mainly in local folklore and place names, with folk songs and legends recalling the disputes between the Zyches and the Wises.

=== Second World War ===
In October 1939, following the German invasion of Poland, a unit led by Major Henryk Dobrzański "Hubal" arrived in the village of Zychy. Hubal was welcomed by local forester Jan Baran, while the rest of the unit was quartered in the village. Over the following days, Zychy became the center of the unit’s operations. Five new members joined during this time, including Marianna Cel, known by the pseudonym "Tereska." Due to a growing German presence in the area, the unit left Zychy on October 30. Soon after, Jan Baran and several other residents were arrested.

=== 21st century ===
On November 10, 2024, a ceremony was held at the monument commemorating the stay of Major Henryk Dobrzański "Hubal" in the village of Zychy and the repressed residents who helped the Hubalians. The event began at 12:00 with a mass in the parish church in Radoszyce. Then, at 13:30, the official opening of the ceremony in Zychy took place at the monument.

== Geography ==
=== Climate ===
Zychy is one of the cooler villages in Poland. It experiences a continental climate, typical for towns in the south of Poland. Many farmers grow crops in the nearby fields and Zychy was also home to a large limestone mine, but was closed in 1939 following the German invasion of Poland at the start of World War II. Average temperatures reach an average of 18.8 °C (65.84 °F) in July and drop to -2.2 °C (28.04 °F) in January. Snow is common in the village from November to October, with about 8 cm of extreme snow in January.

=== Nature ===
The coniferous forest surrounding Zychy are a common spot to find deer and several species of birds. The hiking paths in the area are a popular spot for bird-watching, with the European Goldfinch, Cuckoo bird and Eurasian Jay commonly spotted.

== Religion ==
Similarly to most of the Polish population, the main religion in Zychy is Roman Catholics. Approximately 73.1% of the population identify as Catholics. Most people in the village attend the Church of Saints Peter and Paul in Radoszyce every Sunday, as there is no church in Zychy.

== Population ==
The population of Zychy has fluctuated over the years. The village has an ageing population of 111 people, as of 2020. The population peaked at 265 in 1960, however, multiple factors including the low birth rate, lack of a school and lack of job opportunities have contributed towards the decline in population. The population mostly consists of people over 65 years old.

Year	Population	+%
1950	220	–
1960	265	+20.5%
1970	188	-40.9%
1980	139	-35.2%
1990	115	-20.8%
2000	98	-17.3%
2010	122	+24.4%
2020	111	-9.9%

== Notable people ==
- Krzysztof Kościelniak (Polish historian)
- Tadeusz Kowalski (Polish artist and poet)
- Maciej Ziętara (Polish politician)
- Leon Rodal (Polish journalist)
