= Szostaki =

Szostaki may refer to the following places:

- Szostaki, Gmina Kodeń, Biała County in Lublin Voivodeship (east Poland)
- Szostaki, Biłgoraj County in Lublin Voivodeship (east Poland)
- Szostaki, Łomża County in Podlaskie Voivodeship (north-east Poland)
- Szostaki, Sokółka County in Podlaskie Voivodeship (north-east Poland)
- Szostaki, Greater Poland Voivodeship (west-central Poland)
- Szóstaki, Świętokrzyskie Voivodeship (south-central Poland)
