= Radwanów, Świętokrzyskie Voivodeship =

Radwanów
- Village
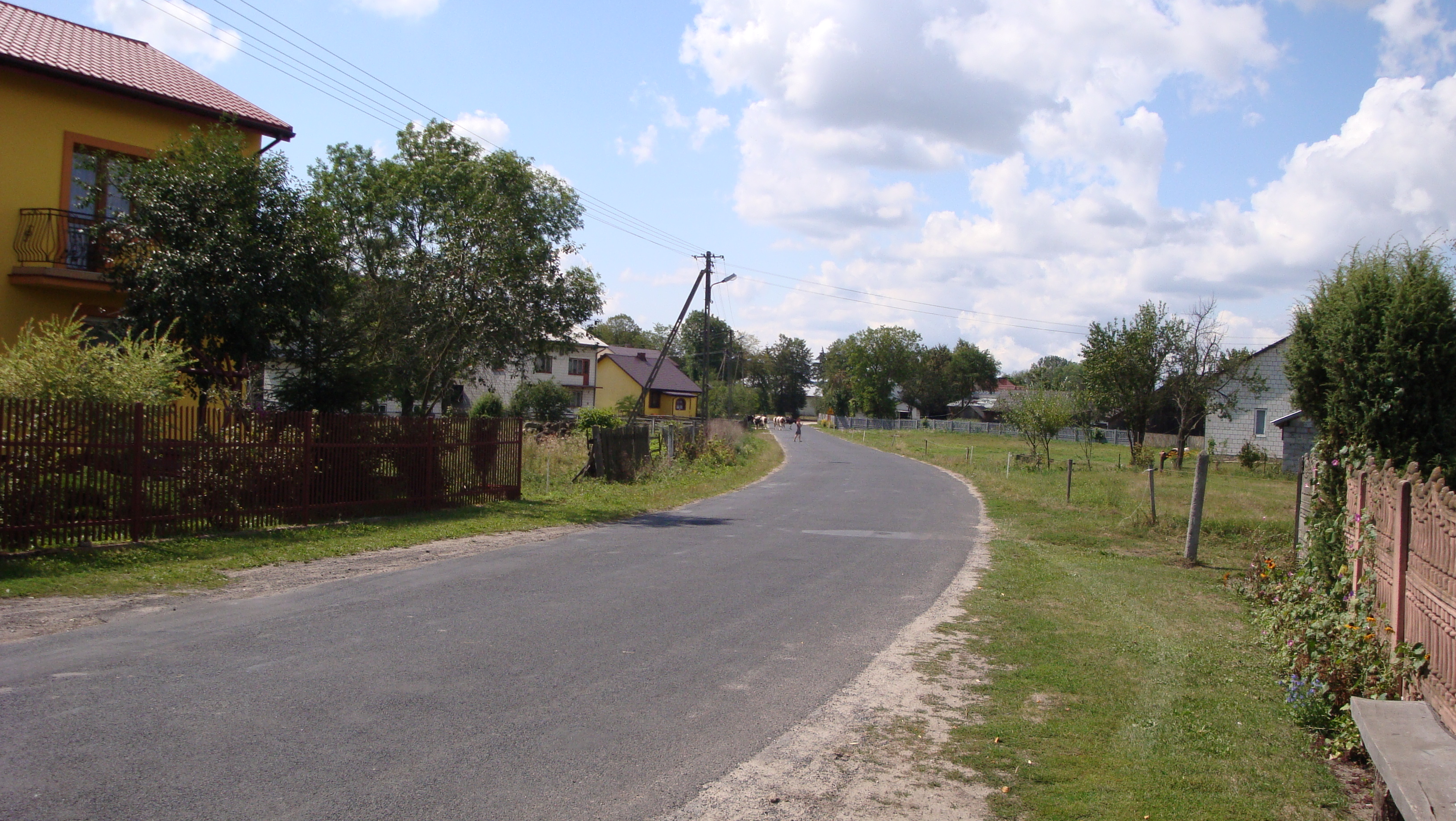
- A road in Radwanów

- Location within Poland
- Coordinates: 51°2′21″N 20°8′54″E
- Country: Poland
- Voivodeship: Świętokrzyskie
- County: Końskie
- Gmina: Słupia Konecka

Radwanów (Polish pronunciation: [raˈdvanuf]) is a village in the administrative district of Gmina Słupia Konecka, within Końskie County, Świętokrzyskie Voivodeship, in south-central Poland. It lies approximately 3 km (2 mi) north of Słupia, 26 km (16 mi) south-west of Końskie, and 38 km (24 mi) north-west of the regional capital Kielce.
