= Olszówka Pilczycka =

- Village
- Location within Poland
- Coordinates: 51°2′15″N 20°7′44″E
- Country: Poland
- Voivodeship: Świętokrzyskie
- County: Końskie
- Gmina: Słupia Konecka
- Population: 100

Olszówka Pilczycka [ɔlˈʂufka pilˈt͡ʂɨt͡ska] is a village in the administrative district of Gmina Słupia Konecka, within Końskie County, Świętokrzyskie Voivodeship, in south-central Poland. It lies approximately 3 km (2 mi) north of Słupia, 28 km (17 mi) south-west of Końskie, and 39 km (24 mi) north-west of the regional capital Kielce.
