= Kapałów =

- Village
- Location within Poland
- Coordinates: 51°2′49″N 20°16′59″E
- Country: Poland
- Voivodeship: Świętokrzyskie
- County: Końskie
- Gmina: Radoszyce
- Population: 430

Kapałów [kaˈpawuf] is a village in the administrative district of Gmina Radoszyce, within Końskie County, Świętokrzyskie Voivodeship, in south-central Poland. It lies approximately 4 km (2 mi) south-east of Radoszyce, 20 km (12 mi) south-west of Końskie, and 30 km (19 mi) north-west of the regional capital Kielce.
