= Słomiana, Świętokrzyskie Voivodeship =

Słomiana
- Village
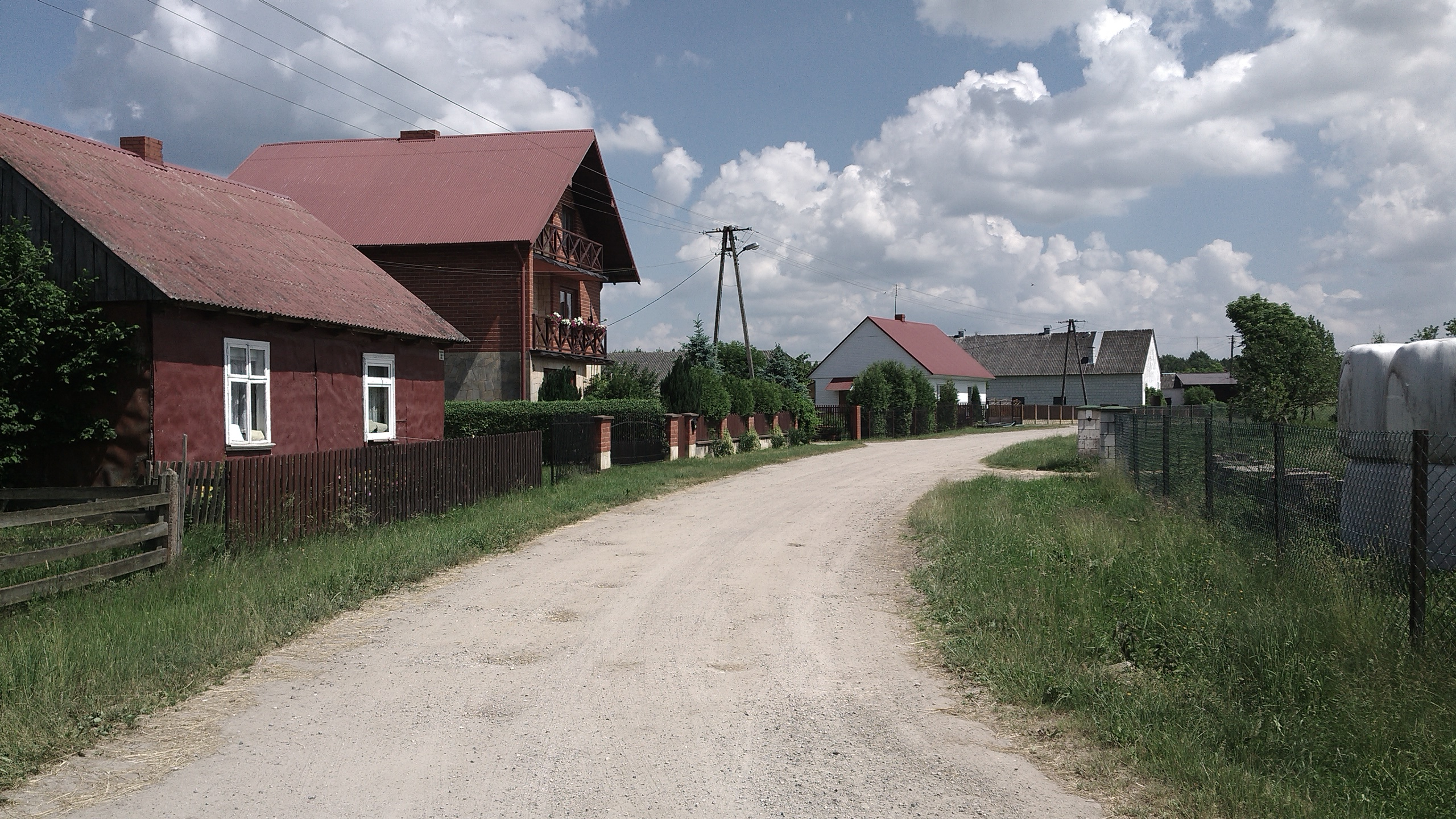
- A road in Słomiana

- Location within Poland
- Coordinates: 51°03′05″N 20°09′54″E
- Country: Poland
- Voivodeship: Świętokrzyskie
- County: Końskie
- Gmina: Słupia Konecka

Słomiana [swɔˈmjana] is a village in the administrative district of Gmina Słupia Konecka, within Końskie County, Świętokrzyskie Voivodeship, in south-central Poland. It lies approximately 5 km (3 mi) north-east of Słupia, 25 km (16 mi) south-west of Końskie, and 37 km (23 mi) north-west of the regional capital Kielce.
