= Wilczkowice, Świętokrzyskie Voivodeship =

Wilczkowice
- Village
- Location within Poland
- Coordinates: 51°1′26″N 20°12′59″E
- Country: Poland
- Voivodeship: Świętokrzyskie
- County: Końskie
- Gmina: Radoszyce

Wilczkowice [vilt͡ʂkɔˈvit͡sɛ] is a village in the administrative district of Gmina Radoszyce, within Końskie County, Świętokrzyskie Voivodeship, in south-central Poland. It lies approximately 7 km (4 mi) south-west of Radoszyce, 25 km (16 mi) south-west of Końskie, and 33 km (21 mi) north-west of the regional capital Kielce.
