= Sęp, Świętokrzyskie Voivodeship =

Sęp
- Village
- Location within Poland
- Coordinates: 51°0′53″N 20°13′26″E
- Country: Poland
- Voivodeship: Świętokrzyskie
- County: Końskie
- Gmina: Radoszyce
- Population: 90

Sęp [sɛmp] is a village in the administrative district of Gmina Radoszyce, within Końskie County, Świętokrzyskie Voivodeship, in south-central Poland. It lies approximately 7 km (4 mi) south of Radoszyce, 25 km (16 mi) south-west of Końskie, and 32 km (20 mi) north-west of the regional capital Kielce.
