= Momocicha =

- Village
- Location within Poland
- Coordinates: 51°2′45″N 20°12′53″E
- Country: Poland
- Voivodeship: Świętokrzyskie
- County: Końskie
- Gmina: Radoszyce

Momocicha [mɔmɔˈt͡ɕixa] is a village in the administrative district of Gmina Radoszyce, within Końskie County, Świętokrzyskie Voivodeship, in south-central Poland. It lies approximately 5 km (3 mi) south-west of Radoszyce, 23 km (14 mi) south-west of Końskie, and 34 km (21 mi) north-west of the regional capital Kielce.
