= Salachowy Bór =

- Village
- Location within Poland
- Coordinates: 51°4′8″N 20°20′25″E
- Country: Poland
- Voivodeship: Świętokrzyskie
- County: Końskie
- Gmina: Radoszyce
- Population: 70

Salachowy Bór (Polish pronunciation: [salaˈxɔvɨ ˈbur]) is a village in the administrative district of Gmina Radoszyce, within Końskie County, Świętokrzyskie Voivodeship, in south-central Poland. It lies approximately 6 km (4 mi) east of Radoszyce, 16 km (10 mi) south of Końskie, and 29 km (18 mi) north-west of the regional capital Kielce.
