= Jóźwików =

- Village
- Location within Poland
- Coordinates: 51°0′51″N 20°17′12″E
- Country: Poland
- Voivodeship: Świętokrzyskie
- County: Końskie
- Gmina: Radoszyce
- Population: 150

Jóźwików [juʑˈvikuf] is a village in the administrative district of Gmina Radoszyce, within Końskie County, Świętokrzyskie Voivodeship, in south-central Poland. It lies approximately 7 km (4 mi) south of Radoszyce, 23 km (14 mi) south-west of Końskie, and 28 km (17 mi) north-west of the regional capital Kielce.
