= Pakuły =

- Village
- Location within Poland
- Coordinates: 51°3′1″N 20°15′13″E
- Country: Poland
- Voivodeship: Świętokrzyskie
- County: Końskie
- Gmina: Radoszyce
- Population: 230

Pakuły [paˈkuwɨ] is a village in the administrative district of Gmina Radoszyce, within Końskie County, Świętokrzyskie Voivodeship, in south-central Poland. It lies approximately 3 km (2 mi) south of Radoszyce, 21 km (13 mi) south-west of Końskie, and 32 km (20 mi) north-west of the regional capital Kielce.
