= Skąpe, Świętokrzyskie Voivodeship =

Skąpe
- Village
- Location within Poland
- Coordinates: 51°0′46″N 20°5′55″E
- Country: Poland
- Voivodeship: Świętokrzyskie
- County: Końskie
- Gmina: Słupia Konecka
- Population: 190

Skąpe [ˈskɔmpɛ] is a village in the administrative district of Gmina Słupia Konecka, within Końskie County, Świętokrzyskie Voivodeship, in south-central Poland. It lies approximately 3 km (2 mi) west of Słupia, 31 km (19 mi) south-west of Końskie, and 40 km (25 mi) west of the regional capital Kielce.
