= Łysów, Świętokrzyskie Voivodeship =

Łysów
- Village
- Location within Poland
- Coordinates: 51°0′52″N 20°19′31″E
- Country: Poland
- Voivodeship: Świętokrzyskie
- County: Końskie
- Gmina: Radoszyce
- Population: 70

Łysów [ˈwɨsuf] is a village in the administrative district of Gmina Radoszyce, within Końskie County, Świętokrzyskie Voivodeship, in south-central Poland. It lies approximately 9 km (6 mi) south-east of Radoszyce, 22 km (14 mi) south of Końskie, and 26 km (16 mi) north-west of the regional capital Kielce.
