= Wiosna =

Wiosna may refer to:

- Spring (political party) (Polish: Wiosna)
- Wiosna, Greater Poland Voivodeship, Poland
- Wiosna, Świętokrzyskie Voivodeship, Poland
