= Mościska Małe =

- Village
- Location within Poland
- Coordinates: 51°3′46″N 20°18′55″E
- Country: Poland
- Voivodeship: Świętokrzyskie
- County: Końskie
- Gmina: Radoszyce

Mościska Małe [mɔɕˈt͡ɕiska ˈmawɛ] is a village in the administrative district of Gmina Radoszyce, within Końskie County, Świętokrzyskie Voivodeship, in south-central Poland. It lies approximately 5 km (3 mi) east of Radoszyce, 17 km (11 mi) south-west of Końskie, and 30 km (19 mi) north-west of the regional capital Kielce.
