= Rytlów =

- Village
- Location within Poland
- Coordinates: 51°1′12″N 20°5′12″E
- Country: Poland
- Voivodeship: Świętokrzyskie
- County: Końskie
- Gmina: Słupia Konecka
- Population: 100

Rytlów [ˈrɨtluf] is a village in the administrative district of Gmina Słupia Konecka, within Końskie County, Świętokrzyskie Voivodeship, in south-central Poland. It lies approximately 4 km (2 mi) west of Słupia, 31 km (19 mi) south-west of Końskie, and 41 km (25 mi) west of the regional capital Kielce.
