= Filipy =

Filipy may refer to the following places:

- Filipy, Przasnysz County in Masovian Voivodeship (east-central Poland)
- Filipy, Podlaskie Voivodeship (north-east Poland)
- Filipy, Świętokrzyskie Voivodeship (south-central Poland)
- Filipy, Węgrów County in Masovian Voivodeship (east-central Poland)
