= Wólka, Końskie County =

Wólka
- Village
- Location within Poland
- Coordinates: 51°0′3″N 20°7′22″E
- Country: Poland
- Voivodeship: Świętokrzyskie
- County: Końskie
- Gmina: Słupia Konecka
- Population: 400

Wólka [ˈvulka] is a village in the administrative district of Gmina Słupia Konecka, within Końskie County, Świętokrzyskie Voivodeship, in south-central Poland. It lies approximately 2 km (1 mi) south-west of Słupia, 31 km (19 mi) south-west of Końskie, and 38 km (24 mi) west of the regional capital Kielce.

In 2008, the village had a population of 400.
