= Ruda Pilczycka =

- Village
- Location within Poland
- Coordinates: 51°3′3″N 20°4′56″E
- Country: Poland
- Voivodeship: Świętokrzyskie
- County: Końskie
- Gmina: Słupia Konecka
- Population: 550

Ruda Pilczycka [ˈruda pilˈt͡ʂɨt͡ska] is a village in the administrative district of Gmina Słupia Konecka, within Końskie County, Świętokrzyskie Voivodeship, in south-central Poland. It lies approximately 6 km (4 mi) north-west of Słupia, 29 km (18 mi) south-west of Końskie, and 42 km (26 mi) north-west of the regional capital Kielce.
