= Piaski, Końskie County =

Piaski
- Village
- Location within Poland
- Coordinates: 51°1′57″N 20°4′34″E
- Country: Poland
- Voivodeship: Świętokrzyskie
- County: Końskie
- Gmina: Słupia Konecka
- Population: 140

Piaski (Polish pronunciation: [ˈpjaskʲi]) is a village in the administrative district of Gmina Słupia Konecka, within Końskie County, Świętokrzyskie Voivodeship, in south-central Poland. It lies approximately 5 km (3 mi) north-west of Słupia, 31 km (19 mi) south-west of Końskie, and 42 km (26 mi) north-west of the regional capital Kielce.
