= Budzisław =

Budzisław may refer to the following places:

- Budzisław, Radziejów County in Kuyavian-Pomeranian Voivodeship (north-central Poland)
- Budzisław, Żnin County in Kuyavian-Pomeranian Voivodeship (north-central Poland)
- Budzisław, Świętokrzyskie Voivodeship (south-central Poland)
