= Podlesie, Końskie County =

Podlesie
- Village
- Location within Poland
- Coordinates: 51°5′47″N 20°17′28″E
- Country: Poland
- Voivodeship: Świętokrzyskie
- County: Końskie
- Gmina: Radoszyce
- Population: 210

Podlesie [pɔdˈlɛɕɛ] is a village in the administrative district of Gmina Radoszyce, within Końskie County, Świętokrzyskie Voivodeship, in south-central Poland. It lies approximately 4 km (2 mi) north-east of Radoszyce, 15 km (9 mi) south-west of Końskie, and 33 km (21 mi) north-west of the regional capital Kielce.
