= Kaliga =

- Village
- Location within Poland
- Coordinates: 51°2′13″N 20°17′56″E
- Country: Poland
- Voivodeship: Świętokrzyskie
- County: Końskie
- Gmina: Radoszyce
- Population: 150

Kaliga [kaˈliɡa] is a village in the administrative district of Gmina Radoszyce, within Końskie County, Świętokrzyskie Voivodeship, in south-central Poland. It lies approximately 6 km (4 mi) south-east of Radoszyce, 20 km (12 mi) south-west of Końskie, and 29 km (18 mi) north-west of the regional capital Kielce.
