= Czerwona Wola, Świętokrzyskie Voivodeship =

Czerwona Wola
- Village
- Location within Poland
- Coordinates: 51°1′19″N 20°10′40″E
- Country: Poland
- Voivodeship: Świętokrzyskie
- County: Końskie
- Gmina: Słupia Konecka

Czerwona Wola [t͡ʂɛrˈvɔna ˈvɔla] is a village in the administrative district of Gmina Słupia Konecka, within Końskie County, Świętokrzyskie Voivodeship, in south-central Poland. It lies approximately 3 km (2 mi) east of Słupia, 28 km (17 mi) south-west of Końskie, and 42 km (26 mi) north-west of the regional capital Kielce.
