= Czerwona Wola-Kolonia =

- Village
- Location within Poland
- Coordinates: 51°0′54″N 20°10′10″E
- Country: Poland
- Voivodeship: Świętokrzyskie
- County: Końskie
- Gmina: Słupia Konecka

Czerwona Wola-Kolonia [t͡ʂɛrˈvɔna ˈvɔla kɔˈlɔɲa] is a village in the administrative district of Gmina Słupia Konecka, within Końskie County, Świętokrzyskie Voivodeship, in south-central Poland. It lies approximately 3 km (2 mi) east of Słupia, 27 km (17 mi) south-west of Końskie, and 35 km (22 mi) north-west of the regional capital Kielce.
