= Pilczyca, Końskie County =

Pilczyca
- Village
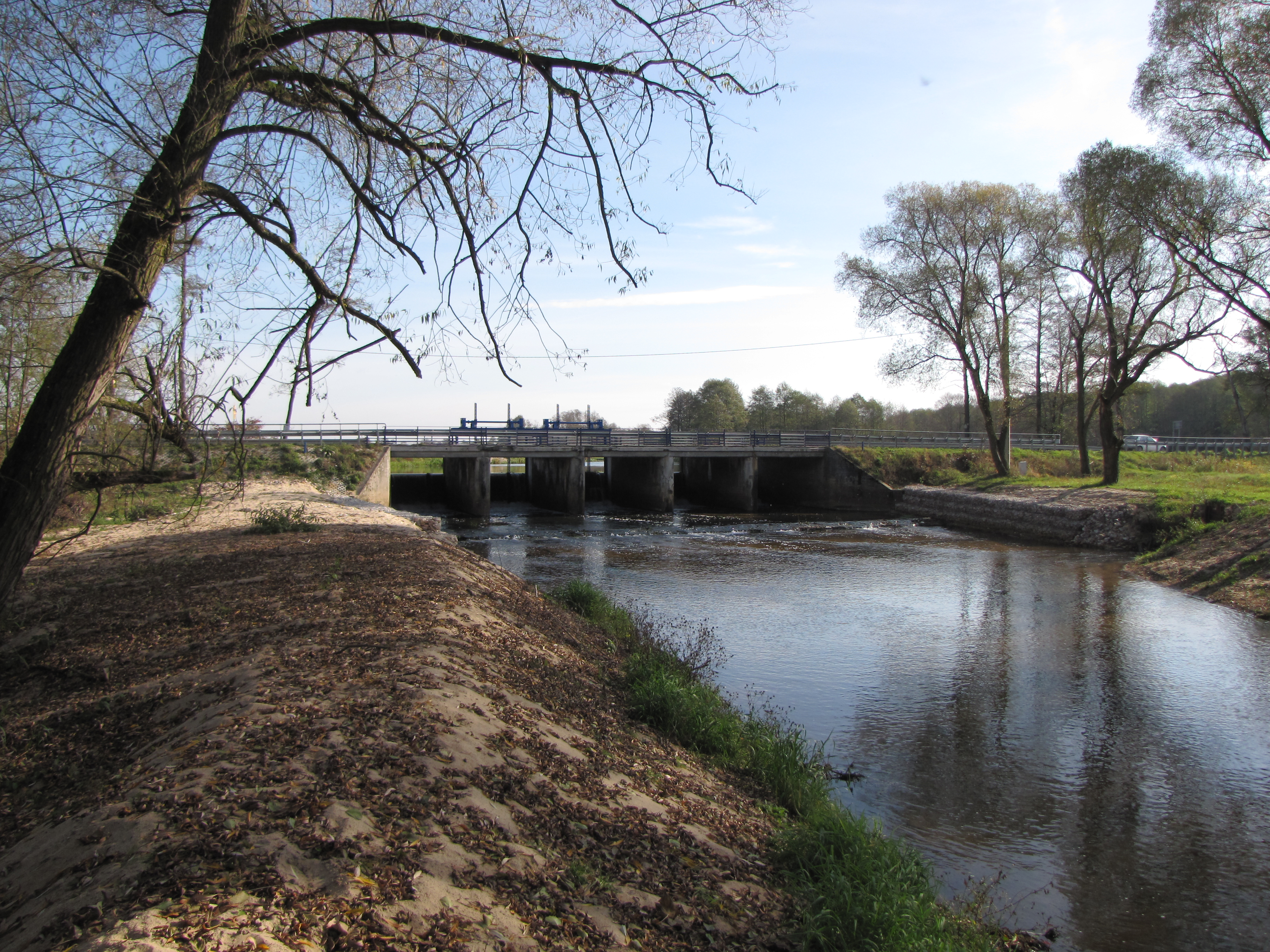
- The dam of the Czarna Włoszczowska river

- Location within Poland
- Coordinates: 51°2′12″N 20°5′28″E
- Country: Poland
- Voivodeship: Świętokrzyskie
- County: Końskie
- Gmina: Słupia Konecka
- Population: 360

Pilczyca [pilˈt͡ʂɨt͡sa] is a village in the administrative district of Gmina Słupia Konecka, within Końskie County, Świętokrzyskie Voivodeship, in south-central Poland. It lies approximately 5 km (3 mi) north-west of Słupia, 30 km (19 mi) south-west of Końskie, and 41 km (25 mi) north-west of the regional capital Kielce.
