= Wyrębów, Świętokrzyskie Voivodeship =

Wyrębów
- Village
- Location within Poland
- Coordinates: 51°2′11″N 20°20′54″E
- Country: Poland
- Voivodeship: Świętokrzyskie
- County: Końskie
- Gmina: Radoszyce
- Population: 160

Wyrębów [vɨˈrɛmbuf] is a village in the administrative district of Gmina Radoszyce, within Końskie County, Świętokrzyskie Voivodeship, in south-central Poland. It lies approximately 8 km (5 mi) south-east of Radoszyce, 19 km (12 mi) south of Końskie, and 26 km (16 mi) north-west of the regional capital Kielce.
