= Górniki =

- Village
- Location within Poland
- Coordinates: 51°3′7″N 20°21′7″E
- Country: Poland
- Voivodeship: Świętokrzyskie
- County: Końskie
- Gmina: Radoszyce

Górniki [ɡurˈniki] is a village in the administrative district of Gmina Radoszyce, within Końskie County, Świętokrzyskie Voivodeship, in south-central Poland. It lies approximately 8 km (5 mi) east of Radoszyce, 18 km (11 mi) south of Końskie, and 27 km (17 mi) north-west of the regional capital Kielce.
