= Jacentów, Końskie County =

Jacentów
- Village
- Location within Poland
- Coordinates: 51°7′0″N 20°15′37″E
- Country: Poland
- Voivodeship: Świętokrzyskie
- County: Końskie
- Gmina: Radoszyce
- Population: 260

Jacentów [jaˈt͡sɛntuf] is a village in the administrative district of Gmina Radoszyce, within Końskie County, Świętokrzyskie Voivodeship, in south-central Poland. It lies approximately 5 km (3 mi) north of Radoszyce, 15 km (9 mi) south-west of Końskie, and 36 km (22 mi) north-west of the regional capital Kielce.
