= Biały Ług, Świętokrzyskie Voivodeship =

Biały Ług
- Village
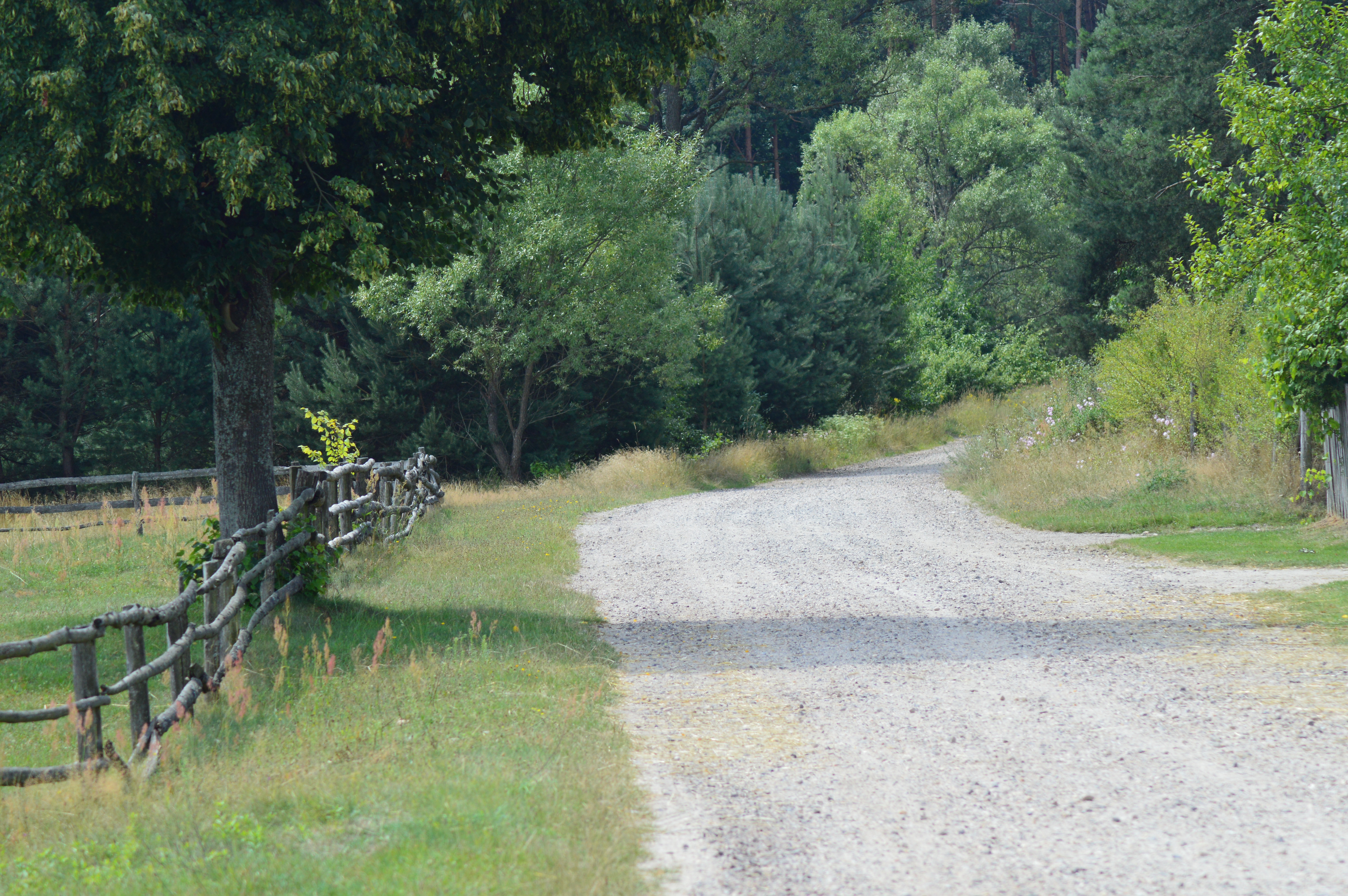
- A rural road in Biały Ług

- Location within Poland
- Coordinates: 51°4′7″N 20°8′21″E
- Country: Poland
- Voivodeship: Świętokrzyskie
- County: Końskie
- Gmina: Słupia Konecka

Biały Ług [ˈbjawɨ ˈwuk] is a village in the administrative district of Gmina Słupia Konecka, within Końskie County, Świętokrzyskie Voivodeship, in south-central Poland. It lies approximately 7 km (4 mi) north of Słupia, 25 km (16 mi) south-west of Końskie, and 40 km (25 mi) north-west of the regional capital Kielce.
