= Kłucko =

- Village
- Location within Poland
- Coordinates: 51°1′33″N 20°21′30″E
- Country: Poland
- Voivodeship: Świętokrzyskie
- County: Końskie
- Gmina: Radoszyce
- Population: 500

Kłucko [ˈkwut͡skɔ] is a village in the administrative district of Gmina Radoszyce, within Końskie County, Świętokrzyskie Voivodeship, in south-central Poland. It lies approximately 9 km (6 mi) south-east of Radoszyce, 20 km (12 mi) south of Końskie, and 25 km (16 mi) north-west of the regional capital Kielce.
