= Nadworów =

- Village
- Location within Poland
- Coordinates: 51°1′24″N 20°14′38″E
- Country: Poland
- Voivodeship: Świętokrzyskie
- County: Końskie
- Gmina: Radoszyce
- Population: 100

Nadworów [nadˈvɔruf] is a village in the administrative district of Gmina Radoszyce, within Końskie County, Świętokrzyskie Voivodeship, in south-central Poland. It lies approximately 6 km (4 mi) south of Radoszyce, 24 km (15 mi) south-west of Końskie, and 31 km (19 mi) north-west of the regional capital Kielce.
