= Hucisko, Gmina Słupia Konecka =

Hucisko
- Village
- Location within Poland
- Coordinates: 51°1′2″N 20°12′3″E
- Country: Poland
- Voivodeship: Świętokrzyskie
- County: Końskie
- Gmina: Słupia Konecka
- Population: 140

Hucisko [xuˈt͡ɕiskɔ] is a village in the administrative district of Gmina Słupia Konecka, within Końskie County, Świętokrzyskie Voivodeship, in south-central Poland. It lies approximately 5 km (3 mi) east of Słupia, 26 km (16 mi) south-west of Końskie, and 33 km (21 mi) north-west of the regional capital Kielce.
