= Węgrzyn =

- Village
- Location within Poland
- Coordinates: 51°1′54″N 20°18′45″E
- Country: Poland
- Voivodeship: Świętokrzyskie
- County: Końskie
- Gmina: Radoszyce
- Population: 160

Węgrzyn [ˈvɛŋɡʐɨn] is a village in the administrative district of Gmina Radoszyce, within Końskie County, Świętokrzyskie Voivodeship, in south-central Poland. It lies approximately 7 km (4 mi) south-east of Radoszyce, 21 km (13 mi) south of Końskie, and 27 km (17 mi) north-west of the regional capital Kielce.
