= Nalewajków =

- Village
- Location within Poland
- Coordinates: 51°2′53″N 20°20′12″E
- Country: Poland
- Voivodeship: Świętokrzyskie
- County: Końskie
- Gmina: Radoszyce
- Population: 160

Nalewajków [nalɛˈvajkuf] is a village in the administrative district of Gmina Radoszyce, within Końskie County, Świętokrzyskie Voivodeship, in south-central Poland. It lies approximately 7 km (4 mi) south-east of Radoszyce, 18 km (11 mi) south of Końskie, and 27 km (17 mi) north-west of the regional capital Kielce.
