= Huta, Świętokrzyskie Voivodeship =

Huta
- Village
- Location within Poland
- Coordinates: 51°2′45″N 20°21′32″E
- Country: Poland
- Voivodeship: Świętokrzyskie
- County: Końskie
- Gmina: Radoszyce
- Population: 102

Huta [ˈxuta] is a village in the administrative district of Gmina Radoszyce, within Końskie County, Świętokrzyskie Voivodeship, in south-central Poland. It lies approximately 8 km (5 mi) south-east of Radoszyce, 18 km (11 mi) south of Końskie, and 26 km (16 mi) north-west of the regional capital Kielce.
