= Zaostrów =

- Village
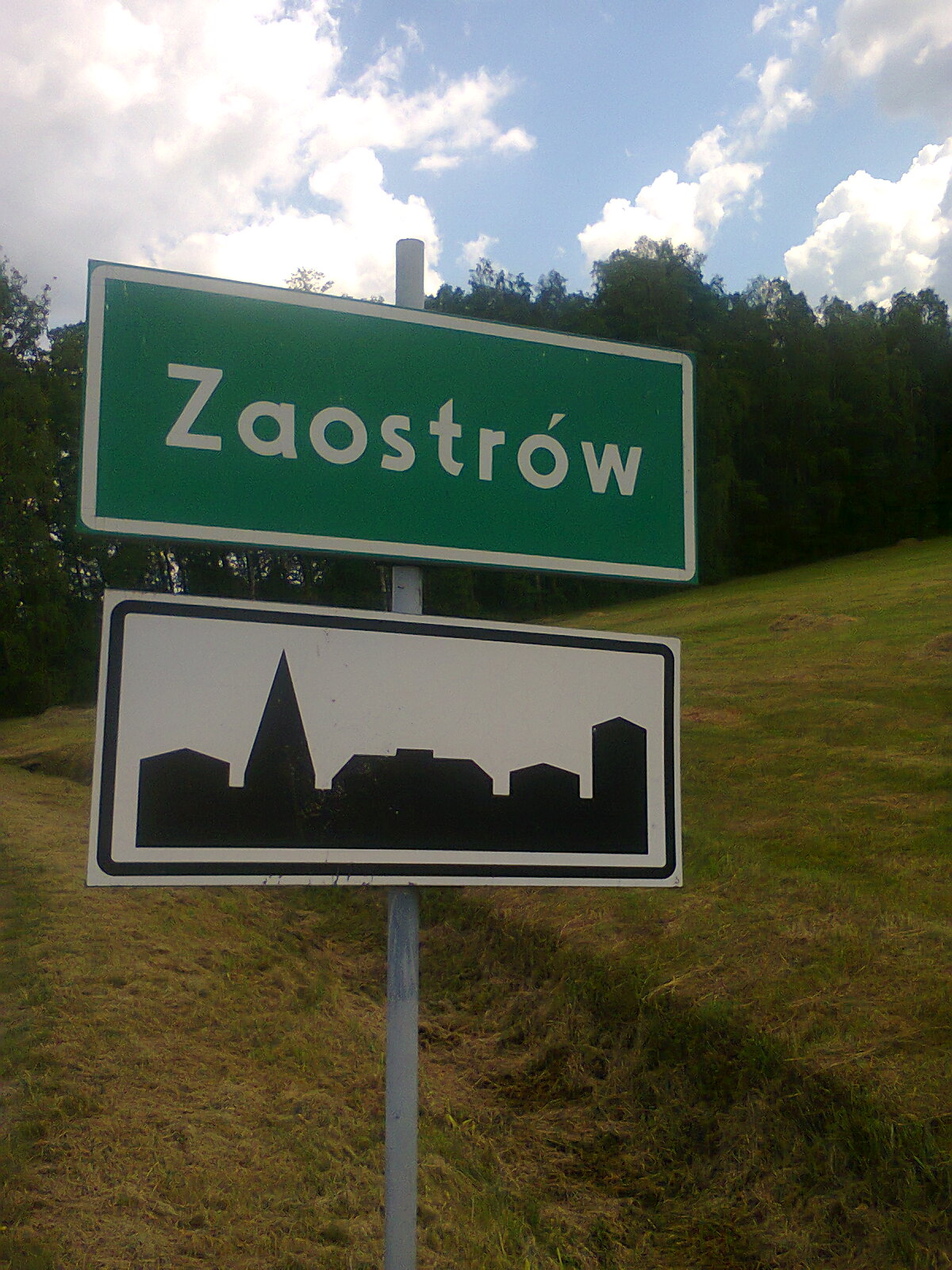

- Location within Poland
- Coordinates: 51°1′24″N 20°3′37″E
- Country: Poland
- Voivodeship: Świętokrzyskie
- County: Końskie
- Gmina: Słupia Konecka
- Population: 210

Zaostrów [zaˈɔstruf] is a village in the administrative district of Gmina Słupia Konecka, within Końskie County, Świętokrzyskie Voivodeship, in south-central Poland. It lies approximately 6 km (4 mi) west of Słupia, 32 km (20 mi) south-west of Końskie, and 42 km (26 mi) west of the regional capital Kielce.
