= Radwanów-Kolonia =

- Village
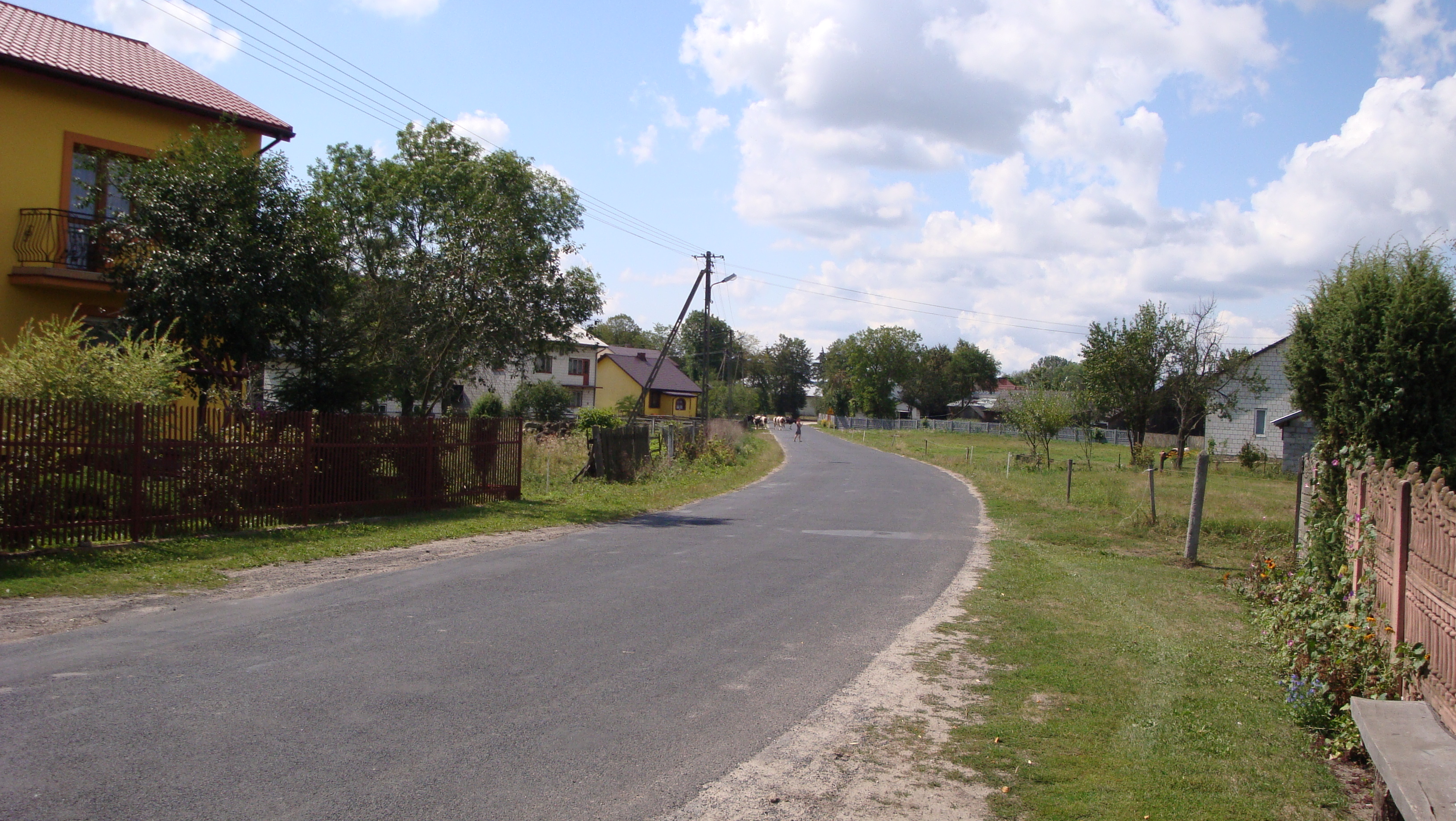

- Location within Poland
- Coordinates: 51°2′43″N 20°8′32″E
- Country: Poland
- Voivodeship: Świętokrzyskie
- County: Końskie
- Gmina: Słupia Konecka

Radwanów-Kolonia (Polish pronunciation: [raˈdvanuf kɔˈlɔɲa]) is a village located in the administrative district of Gmina Słupia Konecka, within Końskie County, Świętokrzyskie Voivodeship, in south-central Poland. It lies approximately 4 km (2 mi) north of Słupia, 26 km (16 mi) south-west of Końskie, and 38 km (24 mi) north-west of the regional capital Kielce.
