= Hucisko-Bania =

- Settlement
- Location within Poland
- Coordinates: 51°00′10″N 20°12′29″E
- Country: Poland
- Voivodeship: Świętokrzyskie
- County: Końskie
- Gmina: Słupia Konecka

Hucisko-Bania [xuˈt͡ɕiskɔ ˈbaɲa], also known as Bania, is a settlement in the administrative district of Gmina Słupia Konecka, within Końskie County, Świętokrzyskie Voivodeship, in south-central Poland.
