= Radoska =

- Village
- Location within Poland
- Coordinates: 51°3′53″N 20°16′20″E
- Country: Poland
- Voivodeship: Świętokrzyskie
- County: Końskie
- Gmina: Radoszyce
- Population: 290

Radoska [raˈdɔska] is a village in the administrative district of Gmina Radoszyce, within Końskie County, Świętokrzyskie Voivodeship, in south-central Poland. It lies approximately 2 km (1 mi) south-east of Radoszyce, 19 km (12 mi) south-west of Końskie, and 32 km (20 mi) north-west of the regional capital Kielce.
