= Słupia-Gabrielów =

- Settlement
- Location within Poland
- Coordinates: 51°00′33″N 20°08′11″E
- Country: Poland
- Voivodeship: Świętokrzyskie
- County: Końskie
- Gmina: Słupia Konecka

Słupia-Gabrielów [ˈswupja ɡaˈbrjɛluf], also known as Gabrielów, is a settlement in the administrative district of Gmina Słupia Konecka, within Końskie County, Świętokrzyskie Voivodeship, in south-central Poland.
