= Parish of Saints Peter and Paul in Radoszyce =

- Roman Catholic Parish of Saints Peter and Paul in Radoszyce
- Parafia Świętych Apostołów Piotra i Pawła w Radoszycach
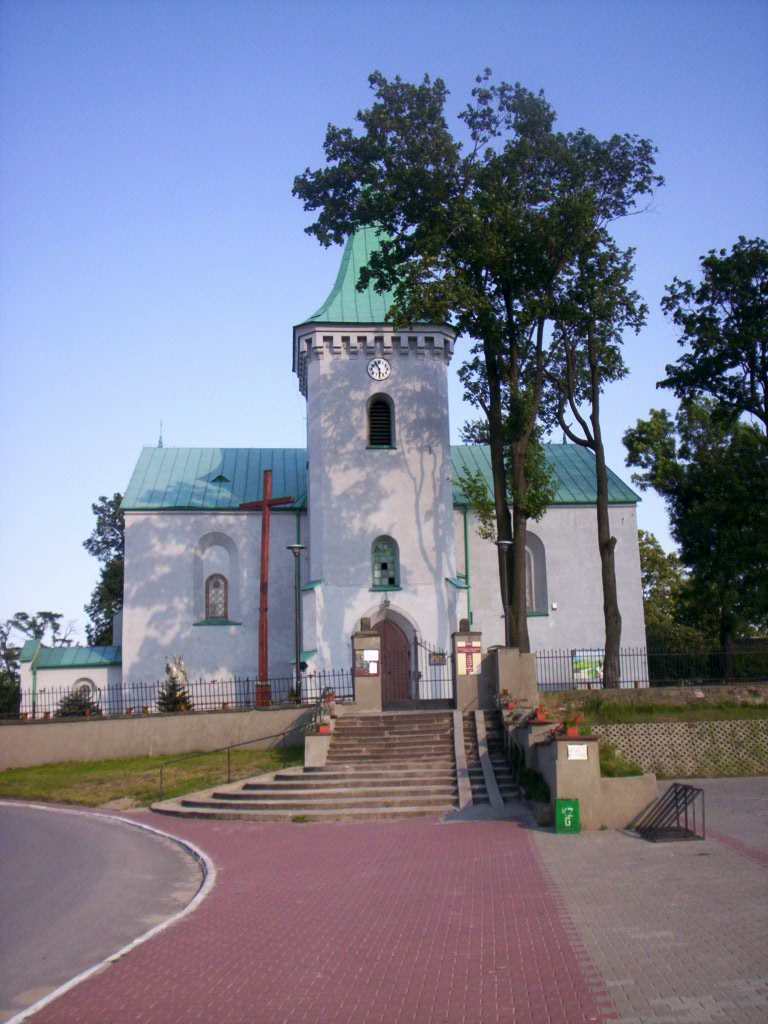
- The church in Radoszyce
- Parish of Saints Peter and Paul in Radoszyce
- Address: ul. 1 Maja 1; 26-230 Radoszyce
- Country: Poland

Architecture
- Completed: 1364

The Roman Catholic Parish of Saints Peter and Paul in Radoszyce is one of 11 parishes in the Radoszyce deanery of the Radom diocese. It was established in 1364.

== History ==
Radoszyce was the seat of the old non-city starosty and a center of the metal industry until the early 19th century. The town was founded under Polish law in the mid-14th century by Casimir III the Great, who founded the first church and castle. In 1428, the town's rights were renewed to Magdeburg rights by Władysław II Jagiełło. King Casimir the Great, Władysław Jagiełło, Casimir IV Jagiellon, and Stanisław August Poniatowski all resided here. The parish and original wooden church of St. Paul the Apostle and St. Stanislaus the Bishop were established with the town's establishment around 1364, funded by Casimir the Great. Another church was built or thoroughly rebuilt in the first half of the 17th century. It was renovated, along with a tower, in 1846 and again in 1901–1902. The northern chapel, dedicated to St. Anne, was built in 1631 and funded by Krzysztof Wirtelicjusz. The southern chapel dates back to before 1620 and was thoroughly rebuilt in the 19th century. The church is an oriented structure, built of stone.

== Parish priests ==
- 1935–1960 – Fr. Karol Grzelak
- 1960–1973 – Fr. Klemens Słapczyński
- 1973–1987 – Fr. Antoni Mąkosa
- 1987–1992 – Fr. Czesław Kołtunowicz
- 1992–1992 – Fr. Andrzej Zapart
- 1992–2002 – Fr. Franciszek Jakubiak
- 2002–2020 – priest canon Józef Tępiński
- since 2020 – Fr. Marek Bartosiński
