= Budzisław, Świętokrzyskie Voivodeship =

Budzisław
- Village
- Location within Poland
- Coordinates: 50°59′20″N 20°6′35″E
- Country: Poland
- Voivodeship: Świętokrzyskie
- County: Końskie
- Gmina: Słupia Konecka
- Population: 230

Budzisław [buˈd͡ʑiswaf] is a village in the administrative district of Gmina Słupia Konecka, within Końskie County, Świętokrzyskie Voivodeship, in south-central Poland. It lies approximately 4 km (2 mi) south-west of Słupia, 32 km (20 mi) south-west of Końskie, and 38 km (24 mi) west of the regional capital Kielce.
