= Wiosna, Świętokrzyskie Voivodeship =

Village in the Świętokrzyskie Voivodeship, in south-central Poland

Wiosna
- Village
- Location within Poland
- Coordinates: 51°6′54″N 20°18′13″E
- Country: Poland
- Voivodeship: Świętokrzyskie
- County: Końskie
- Gmina: Radoszyce
- Population: 100

Wiosna [ˈvjɔsna] is a village in the administrative district of Gmina Radoszyce, within Końskie County, Świętokrzyskie Voivodeship, in south-central Poland. It lies approximately 6 km (4 mi) north-east of Radoszyce, 13 km (8 mi) south-west of Końskie, and 34 km (21 mi) north-west of the regional capital Kielce.
