= Krzysztof Kościelniak =

Polish historian, academic and Catholic priest (born 1965)

Krzysztof Kościelniak (born 7 August 1965) is a Polish historian, academic and Catholic priest. He is currently full Professor of History (History of the Orient, Asian Studies, Islamic Studies, History of Religion, History of the Oriental Churches). Currently, a full professor at the Jagiellonian University, 1994-2021 the researcher and lecturer at the John Paul II Pontifical Academy (UPJPII) in Kraków and in the Seminary of the Pauline Fathers in Kraków.

== Early life and education ==
Krzysztof Kościelniak was born on 7 August 1965 in Zychy, Poland.

He studied at the Higher Theological Seminary of the Archdiocese of Kraków (1985-1991) and the Pontifical Academy of Theology in Kraków (PAT; since 2009 the John Paul II Pontifical University – UPJPII), the second cycle of studies at the Faculty of Theology (1992). Further studies at: the Institute of Oriental Philology, Jagiellonian University (1995-1996), Institut für Sprachen und Kulturen des Vorderen Orients, Ruprecht Karls Universität Heidelberg, Germany (1996-1997), Pontificio Istituto di Studi Arabi e d'Islamistica – Arabic Study Centre Cairo, Egypt (1997-1998); Franciscan Center of Christian Oriental Studies, Cairo, Egypt (1997-1998). Ph.D. (Religiology) in 1999 from the Faculty of Theology of the Pontifical Academy of Theology. Habilitation (postdoctoral dissertation) in the Humanities, History of the Orient, 2001, Faculty of History and Cultural Heritage (PAT).

== Research experience ==
Research long-term stay in Syria (2002-2003), professorship in 2004/2005 (Full Professor) – Faculty of History, Jagiellonian University. Various research stays, including Syria (a dozen times in 2004–2011), Rome, French Polynesia, London, New Zealand. Studies of the Muslim minority in Xīnjiāng (China), Yala, Pattani, Narathiwat (southern Thailand) and Turkey. A lecturer at Fu Jen Catholic University and Tamkang University, Taipei (2016-2017). A lecturer at Caucasus International University (2018) in Tbilisi (Georgia), visiting professor at Imam Khomeini International University (2019) in Qazvin (Iran).

== Professional experience ==
Working as the Catholic priest he experienced Catholic communities in many countries

Jagiellonian University: since 2005, a full professor at the Faculty of International and Political Studies; since 2011, Head of the Department of the Middle East and North Africa, in 2012–2016, Head of the Institute of the Middle and Far East, (he contributed to the creation of Asian Studies), member of some commissions, organizer of several student summer schools in many Asian countries.

Pontifical Academy of Theology (since 2009 the John Paul II Pontifical University in Kraków): since 1994, a lecturer at the Faculty of Theology, the Faculty of Philosophy, the Faculty of History and Cultural Heritage, Faculty of Social Sciences). Assistant Professor (2001-2009) and Full Professor at the Faculty of History and Cultural Heritage (2009-2011). He held many positions, founder and editor-in-chief of the scientific journal 'Orientalia Christiana Cracoviensia' (2009-2012), the series of Oriental sources and monographs, he organized several student summer schools in Syria.

Expert activities: among others, the Congress of EPP Group in the European Parliament in Venice, Doha International Center for Interfaith Dialogue (Qatar),Al-Rai Center for Studies, Jordan Europe Business Association, the Chinese Academy of Sciences, Malaysia (Islamic Science University of Malaysia), Singapore (10th International Conference on Language Literature, Culture and Education 2018) and Seville (World Congress on Middle Eastern Studies 2018). He delivered ca. 120 scientific papers and has given many interviews.

== Scientific work and research ==
His research activities focus on the fields Asian/Oriental studies:

- the condition of the Muslim states, contemporary Islam and the Muslim minorities (Models of modernization of Islam in a dynamic context, the processes of democratization in today's Islamic world, elements of democracy in the Islamic world, the attempts of the separation of religion and state, Christian and Muslim perceptions of secularization its practical application in the Muslim countries and the economic consequences of the 'Arab Spring' (2011-2013) in Egypt, Tunisia, Syria and Libya, sources of the ideological success of Russia in the Syrian Civil War, external and internal prospects for ending Syria's civil war, cultural, and ethnic diversities of Muslim immigrants in Poland in the period of 1989–2014, perspectives and challenges of migration of Muslims to Europe, the Muslim-Hindu relations after the establishment of Bharatiya Janata Party(India), Muslim Uighur community in China, the life of Afaq Khoja (1626-1694) in the historical context and the polemics about his role within the Uighur community).

- Islamic Studies (Christian influences in Muslim tradition, the concept of time and calendar in Islam, Quranic demonology, the concept of al-ʿArāf ('Muslim purgatory'), the Qur'an hermeneutic in the world of Islam, Islamic jurisprudence and the rules of Sunni Muslim theology aspects of divinization according to Farīd-al-dīn ʿAṭṭār Nīšāpūrī (died ca. 1221), the concept of the universality of Islam, the Muslim eschatology, the slavery and the status of women in Islam, the concept of Jihad in Sunni sources (Qur'an, Sunnah) and the modern modifications and perceptions of Jihad in the Islamic world. Jihad in various aspects contexts (historical, theological and dialogue of life). Author of the first Polish Concordance of the Qurʾān. He has translated and commented on several Hadiths.)

- the history of Islam and the Muslim World (the history of Central Asia from the 6th to the 12th centuries and history of sub-Saharan Africa in the Middle Ages (published as parts of 'The Great History of the World). The achievements and failures of the Abbasids (750-1258), meanings of history in the Muslim thought, He has described Muhammad's tomb in Medina in the 17th century (focusing on the relations of the Islamicised Polish men kidnapped by Turks to Egypt) and analyzed the contribution of Tadeusz Lewicki (1906-1992) to Islamic studies and the history of West Africa.), he critically examined historical facts about the Battle of Al-Qādisiyya (636/637?), he presented the unsuccessful attempt to create the Arab kingdom of Syria by following the course of events from the attempts to proclaim Greater Syria to Syria divided under the French mandate (1915-1922).

- the Oriental Churches (Arab Christianity before Muhammad, and Christian Arabic literature before the rise of Islam The Christians in the Muslim world in the Middle Ages, the history of the Melkite Church (634-1516), the Maronite Church in the Middle East as a bridge between the East and the West, the contribution of Christian Maronites to the famous Organic Statute of Lebanon (Règlement) in 1861 and 1864 and statistical changes of Christians in Lebanon and Syria in the twentieth century. The changes of Coptic identity, the pluralism of the Catholic Church in Egypt, the condition of Christian minorities in Turkey and mariology in the East Syriac tradition.

- Islam and Christianity - interactions and dialogue (the influence of Biblical demonology on the Quranic concepts of Satan in the context of the interaction of Ancient religions, apocryphal tradition in the Quranic demonology, Muslim tradition in the background of the Christian-Islamic acculturation from the 7th to the 10th centuries, the origin, history and meaning of the New Testament borrowings in the hadiths, the interaction between the Qur'an and pre-Islamic Polytheistic and Christian beliefs, the Old and New Testament elements in the Qur'an, Christian influences on some Muslim interpretations of al-ʿArāf ('the Muslim purgatory') and early Christian (Patristic) elements in the Qur'an, the differences between Islam and Christianity.

- the History of Muslim-Christian Relations (the sources depicting the seizure of the Church of St. John the Baptist in Damascus during the reign of Caliph Walid II, the dynamism of the Muslim-Christian acculturation in the first centuries of Islam in the Middle East, culture and religion in the Middle East in the first centuries of Islam according to Ibn Haldūn (1332-1406), Christological aspects of the Christian-Islamic polemics from the early ages of Islam, the Arab invasion in Rome (846), the condition of Christian communities in the Muslim world before the Crusaders, the ambivalence of the position of Christians in the Muslim community, the destruction of the Church of the Holy Sepulchre in Jerusalem in 1009, the description of Christians in Egypt by the Franciscan friar Anthony Gonzales (1673), the praise of the crusaders' attitude towards Muslims in Ibn Jubayr's chronicle concerning his journey to the East (d. 1217), the significance of the Franciscans in the Middle East during the Mameluke epoch, the imitation of the Islamic ideology of Jihad in 'Tactica' by Emperor Leo VI (866-912), the missionary activities of Protestant Churches in the eastern provinces of the Ottoman Empire in the first half of the 19th century, Western influences on the shaping of the political system in Lebanon in the second half of the 19th century. Muslim-Christian dialogue in the context of human rights (the Universal Declaration of Human Rights), dialogue of life between Christians and Muslims in the history of Lebanon (1861-1945) after the Organic Statute of Lebanon (Règlement), the Polish experience of co-existence between Christians and Muslims.

- theology and the history of religions, religious studies (the author of textbooks as part of the series 'Religions of the modern Middle and far East'; the first volume presents the complex of the phenomenon of religion, the second volume shows the comprehensive outline of Hinduism. He has also published the textbook on the Catholic theology of religions and has co-authored two textbooks on Catholic fundamental theology. He has compared the idea of martyrdom in several religions of the world. Investigated the contacts and interactions of the ancient Egyptians with the nomadic (Arab?) culture, elements of the ancient Egyptian demonology in religion in pre-Islamic Arabia, he presented the perspectives and problems of Catholic missions in Asia.

- biblical studies (this range of publications is typical for his early research activities (mainly biblical demonology). He has analyzed the theme of evil spirits in the Bible, presented an exegesis of some fragments of the Gospel of John which has the term άρχων του̃ κόσμου τούτου ('Lord of this world'). He has examined the connection between biblical demonology and ancient religions of the Middle East, and polemized with the theory of Gerald Messadié (Histoire générale du diable) that biblical demonology directly depends on Persian demonology. In addition to biblical demonology, he has conducted an exegesis of the Lord's Prayer and other fragments of the New Testament which were incorporated into the Muslim tradition.)

== Membership in professional organizations ==
Member of the Association of European Arabists and Islamicists (L'Union Europeene des Arabisants st Islamisants – UEAI); the Committee of Oriental Studies of the Polish Academy of Sciences in Warsaw, (2011-2014, the member of the presidium of this committee); the Committee on Byzantine of the Polish Academy of Sciences in Warsaw, Scientific Society of Australia, New Zealand and Oceania; the Association of the Fundamental Theologians in Poland and the Polish Theological Society in Kraków (both the Theological Commission and the Historical Commission), the John Paul II Intercultural Dialogue Institute in Kraków.

== Books ==
- Polish Muslims. Religion and Culture [Muzułmanie polscy. Religia i kultura], Kraków: Wydawnictwo M 2015 ( accessed: 20.12.2016);
- Hinduism „Contemporary Religions of the Middle East and Far East" vol. 2 [Hinduizm, „Religie współczesnego Bliskiego i Dalekiego Wschodu" vol. 2], Kraków: Wydawnictwo M 2015;
- The Complex Phenomenon of Religion, „Contemporary Religions of the Middle East and Far East" vol. 1 [Złożony obraz zjawiska religii, „Religie współczesnego Bliskiego i Dalekiego Wschodu" vol. 1], Kraków: Wydawnictwo M 2014; (accessed 12.12.2016)
- Religious and Philosophical aspects of times and history in Islam, [Czas i historia w islamie. Kalendarz i podstawy chronologii muzułmańskiej], Kraków: Wydawnictwo UJ 2013 (accessed: 12.07.2016);
- Dilemmas of democracy In the Middle East. Israel, Jordan, Turkey, ed. K. Kościelniak, Kraków: UNUM 2010 (accessed: 12.07.2016).
- State, Religion, Community. Selected Topics from Political Modernization in the Middle East [Państwo, religia i wspólnota. Wybrane zagadnienia z procesów modernizacji na Bliskim Wschodzie], ed. K. Kościelniak, Kraków: UNUM 2010;
- Change and Stability. State, Religion and Politics in the Middle East and North Africa, ed. K. Kościelniak, Kraków: UNUM 2010 (accessed: 22.12.2016);
- Prosperity and Stagnation. Some Cultural and Social Aspects of the Abbasides Period (750-1258), ed. K. Kościelniak, "Orientalia Christiana Cracoviensia" 1, Kraków 2010 (accessed: 12.07.2016);
- Human rights in the culture of the Northern Africa, the Middle and Far East [Prawa człowieka w kulturze północnej Afryki Bliskiego i Dalekiego Wschodu], ed. K. Kościelniak, Kraków: UNUM 2008 (accessed: 12.12.2016).
- Theme Concordance of the Koran [Tematyczna konkordancja do Koranu, Kraków 2006, Kraków: UNUM 2006 (accessed: 10.07.2016);
- The Sunnah, Hadiths and Traditionalists. An Introduction to the Muslim Tradition [Sunna, hadisy i tradycjoniści. Wstęp do tradycji muzułmańskiej], Kraków: UNUM 2006 (accessed: 10.07.2016);
- Christentum und Islam. Perspektive und Probleme des Dialogs, Kraków: UNUM, 2005 (accessed: 15.07.2016);
- Greeks and Arabs. The History of the Melkite (Catholic) Church in the lands conquered by the Muslims (634-1516) [Grecy i Arabowie. Historia Kościoła melkickiego (katolickiego) na ziemiach zdobytych przez muzułmanów (634-1516)], Kraków: UNUM 2004 (accessed: 10.07.2016);
- The Jihad. Holy War in Islam. The Relation Between Religion and State. Islam vs. Democracy. Christians in the Islamic Countries, [Dżihad. Święta wojna w islamie. Związek religii z państwem. Islam a demokracja. Chrześcijanie w krajach muzułmańskich], Kraków: Wydawnictwo M 2002 (accessed: 17.07.2016);
- Zło osobowe w Biblii. Egzegetyczne, historyczne, religioznawcze i kulturowe aspekty demonologii biblijnej, Kraków: Wydawnictwo M 2002 (accessed: 17.12.2016);
- Christianity Encountering World Religions [Chrześcijaństwo w spotkaniu z religiami świata], Kraków: Wydawnictwo M 2002 (accessed: 14.07.2016);
- Muslim Tradition in the Background of the Christian-Islamic Acculturation from the 7th to the 10th Centuries. The Origin, History and Meaning of the New Testament Borrowings in the Hadiths [Tradycja muzułmańska na tle akulturacji chrześcijańsko-islamskiej od VII do X wieku. Geneza, historia i znaczenie zapożyczeń nowotestamentowych w hadisach], Kraków: UNUM 2001 (accessed: 22.11.2016).
- 20 Centuries of Christianity in the Arab Culture, Volume I: Ancient Arabia. Christianity in Arabia until Muhammad (d. 632) [XX wieków chrześcijaństwa w kulturze arabskiej. Tom I: Arabia starożytna. Chrześcijaństwo w Arabii do Mahometa (632)], Kraków: UNUM 2000 (accessed: 19.07.2016);
- Evil Spirits in the Bible and the Koran – the influence of biblical demonology on the Koranic conceptions of Satan in the context of interactions of the Ancient religions [Złe duchy w Biblii i Koranie - wpływ demonologii biblijnej na koraniczne koncepcje szatana w kontekście oddziaływań religii starożytnych], Kraków: UNUM 1999 (accessed: 1.07.201).
