= Mnin-Błagodać =

- Settlement
- Location within Poland
- Coordinates: 50°59′10″N 20°11′45″E
- Country: Poland
- Voivodeship: Świętokrzyskie
- County: Końskie
- Gmina: Słupia Konecka

Mnin-Błagodać [ˈmnin bwaˈɡɔdat͡ɕ], also known as Błagodać, is a settlement in the administrative district of Gmina Słupia Konecka, within Końskie County, Świętokrzyskie Voivodeship, in south-central Poland.
