= Szóstaki =

- Village
- Location within Poland
- Coordinates: 51°1′44″N 20°15′35″E
- Country: Poland
- Voivodeship: Świętokrzyskie
- County: Końskie
- Gmina: Radoszyce
- Population: 160

Szóstaki [ʂusˈtaki] is a village in the administrative district of Gmina Radoszyce, within Końskie County, Świętokrzyskie Voivodeship, in south-central Poland. It lies approximately 5 km (3 mi) south of Radoszyce, 22 km (14 mi) south-west of Końskie, and 30 km (19 mi) north-west of the regional capital Kielce.
