= Gmina Słupia Konecka =

Gmina Słupia Konecka Słupia Konecka Commune
- Gmina
- Flag Coat of arms
- Interactive map of Gmina Słupia Konecka
- Coordinates (Słupia): 51°0′49″N 20°8′27″E
- Country: Poland
- Voivodeship: Świętokrzyskie
- County: Końskie
- Seat: Słupia

Area
  - Total: 105.66 km^{2} (40.80 sq mi)

Population (2006)
  - Total: 3,581
  - Density: 33.89/km^{2} (87.78/sq mi)
- Website: Official website

Gmina Słupia Konecka is a rural gmina (administrative district) in Końskie County, Świętokrzyskie Voivodeship, in south-central Poland. Its seat is the village of Słupia, which lies approximately 29 kilometres (18 mi) south-west of Końskie and 37 km (23 mi) north-west of the regional capital Kielce.

== History ==
Until 1954 the gmina was named Pijanów, former municipal seat and currently a hamlet of Słupia Konecka. The gmina was named Słupia from 1973 to 1999, and Słupia (Konecka) from 1999 to 2017, when it took the current name.

== Geography ==
The gmina covers an area of 105.66 square kilometres (40.8 sq mi), and as of 2006 its total population is 3,581. It contains part of the protected area called Przedbórz Landscape Park.

=== Villages ===
Gmina Słupia contains the villages and settlements of Biały Ług, Budzisław, Czerwona Wola, Czerwona Wola-Kolonia, Hucisko, Hucisko-Bania, Mnin, Mnin-Błagodać, Mnin-Mokre, Mnin-Przymusów, Mnin-Szwedy, Olszówka Pilczycka, Piaski, Pijanów, Pilczyca, Radwanów, Radwanów-Kolonia, Ruda Pilczycka, Rytlów, Skąpe, Słomiana, Słupia, Słupia-Bukowie, Słupia-Gabrielów, Słupia-Podwole, Wólka, Wólka-Konradów, Wólka-Mogielnica and Zaostrów.

=== Neighbouring gminas ===
Gmina Słupia is bordered by the gminas of Fałków, Krasocin, Łopuszno, Przedbórz, Radoszyce and Ruda Maleniecka.
