= Mnin-Szwedy =

- Settlement
- Location within Poland
- Coordinates: 51°00′06″N 20°10′05″E
- Country: Poland
- Voivodeship: (Świętokrzyskie Voivodeship) Świętokrzyskie
- County: Końskie
- Gmina: Słupia Konecka

Mnin-Szwedy [ˈmnin ˈʂfɛdɨ], also known as Szwedy, is a settlement in the administrative district of Gmina Słupia Konecka, within Końskie County, Świętokrzyskie Voivodeship, in south-central Poland.
