= Mnin =

- Village
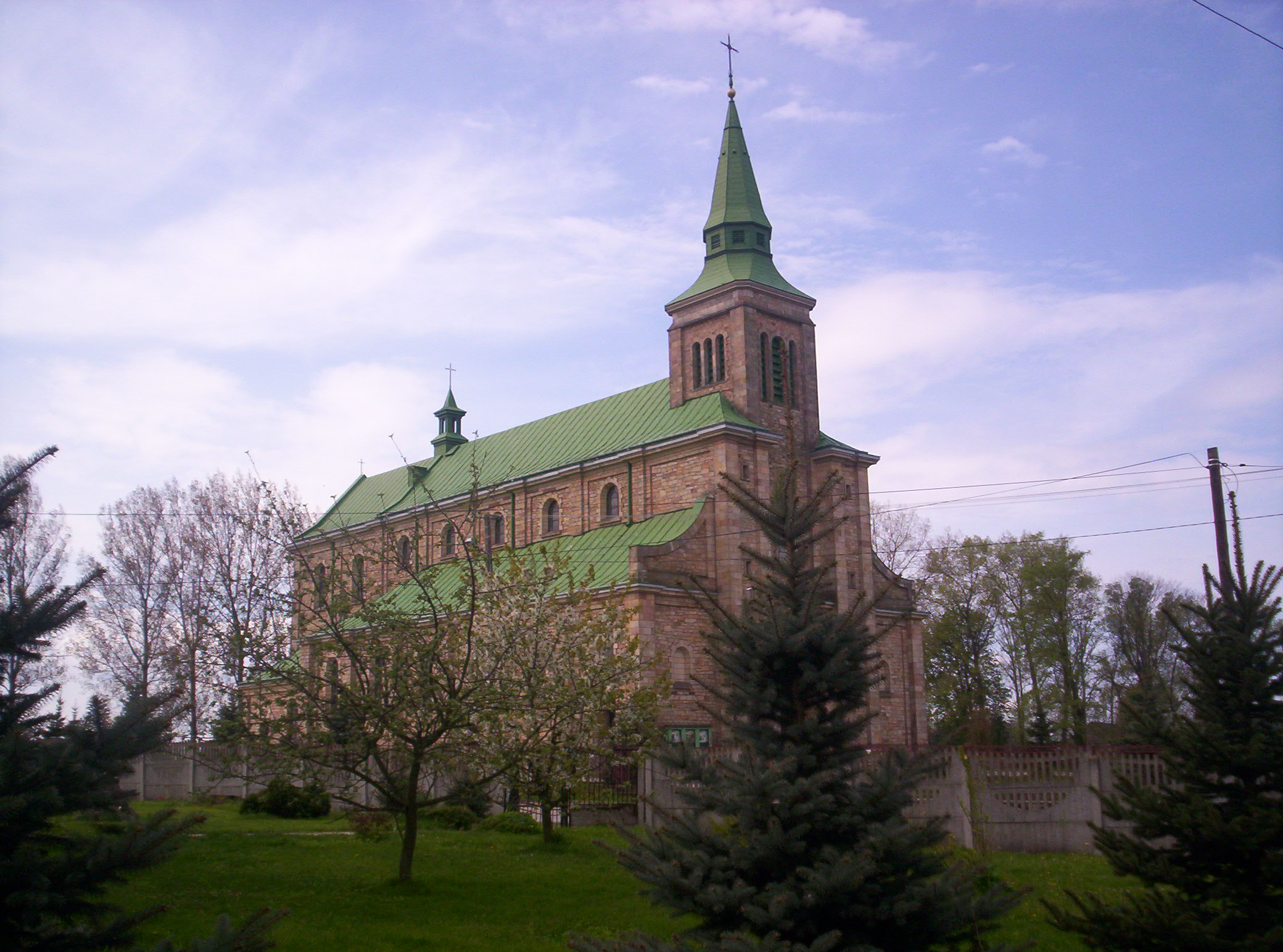
- Church of the Assumption of Mary and St. Thecla

- Location within Poland
- Coordinates: 50°59′27″N 20°11′13″E
- Country: Poland
- Voivodeship: Świętokrzyskie
- County: Końskie
- Gmina: Słupia Konecka
- Population: 640

Mnin [mnin] is a village in the administrative district of Gmina Słupia Konecka, within Końskie County, Świętokrzyskie Voivodeship, in south-central Poland. It lies approximately 5 km (3 mi) south-east of Słupia, 29 km (18 mi) south-west of Końskie, and 33 km (21 mi) west of the regional capital Kielce.
