= Mnin-Przymusów =

- Settlement
- Location within Poland
- Coordinates: 51°0′19.8″N 20°10′35.04″E
- Country: Poland
- Voivodeship: Świętokrzyskie
- County: Końskie
- Gmina: Słupia Konecka

Mnin-Przymusów [ˈmnin pʂɨˈmusuf], also known as Przymusów, is a settlement in the administrative district of Gmina Słupia Konecka, located within Końskie County, Świętokrzyskie Voivodeship, in south-central Poland.
