= Mnin-Mokre =

- Settlement
- Location within Poland
- Coordinates: 50°58′56″N 20°10′45″E
- Country: Poland
- Voivodeship: Świętokrzyskie
- County: Końskie
- Gmina: Słupia Konecka

Mnin-Mokre [ˈmnin ˈmɔkrɛ], also known as Mokre, is a settlement in the administrative district of Gmina Słupia Konecka, within Końskie County, Świętokrzyskie Voivodeship, in south-central Poland.
