= Grodzisko, Świętokrzyskie Voivodeship =

Grodzisko
- Village
- Location within Poland
- Coordinates: 51°3′44″N 20°13′8″E
- Country: Poland
- Voivodeship: Świętokrzyskie
- County: Końskie
- Gmina: Radoszyce
- Population: 400

Grodzisko [ɡrɔˈd͡ʑiskɔ] is a village in the administrative district of Gmina Radoszyce, within Końskie County, Świętokrzyskie Voivodeship, in south-central Poland. It lies approximately 3 km (2 mi) south-west of Radoszyce, 21 km (13 mi) south-west of Końskie, and 35 km (22 mi) north-west of the regional capital Kielce.
