= Słupia-Podwole =

- Settlement
- Location within Poland
- Coordinates: 51°00′49″N 20°09′28″E
- Country: Poland
- Voivodeship: Świętokrzyskie
- County: Końskie
- Gmina: Słupia Konecka

Słupia-Podwole [ˈswupja pɔdˈvɔlɛ], also known as Podwole, is a settlement in the administrative district of Gmina Słupia Konecka, within Końskie County, Świętokrzyskie Voivodeship, in south-central Poland.
