= Wólka-Mogielnica =

- Settlement
- Location within Poland
- Coordinates: 50°59′30″N 20°07′55″E
- Country: Poland
- Voivodeship: Świętokrzyskie
- County: Końskie
- Gmina: Słupia Konecka

Wólka-Mogielnica [ˈvulka mɔɡʲɛlˈnit͡sa], also known as Mogielnica, is a settlement in the administrative district of Gmina Słupia Konecka, within Końskie County, Świętokrzyskie Voivodeship, in south-central Poland.
