= Wólka-Konradów =

- Settlement
- Location within Poland
- Coordinates: 51°00′34″N 20°06′43″E
- Country: Poland
- Voivodeship: Świętokrzyskie
- County: Końskie
- Gmina: Słupia Konecka

Wólka-Konradów [ˈvulka kɔnˈraduf], also known as Konradów, is a settlement in the administrative district of Gmina Słupia Konecka, within Końskie County, Świętokrzyskie Voivodeship, in south-central Poland.
