= Wisy =

- Village
- Location within Poland
- Coordinates: 51°4′46″N 20°13′21″E
- Country: Poland
- Voivodeship: Świętokrzyskie
- County: Końskie
- Gmina: Radoszyce
- Population: 50

Wisy [ˈvisɨ] is a village in the administrative district of Gmina Radoszyce, within Końskie County, Świętokrzyskie Voivodeship, in south-central Poland. It lies approximately 3 km (2 mi) west of Radoszyce, 20 km (12 mi) south-west of Końskie, and 36 km (22 mi) north-west of the regional capital Kielce.
