= Pijanów =

- Village
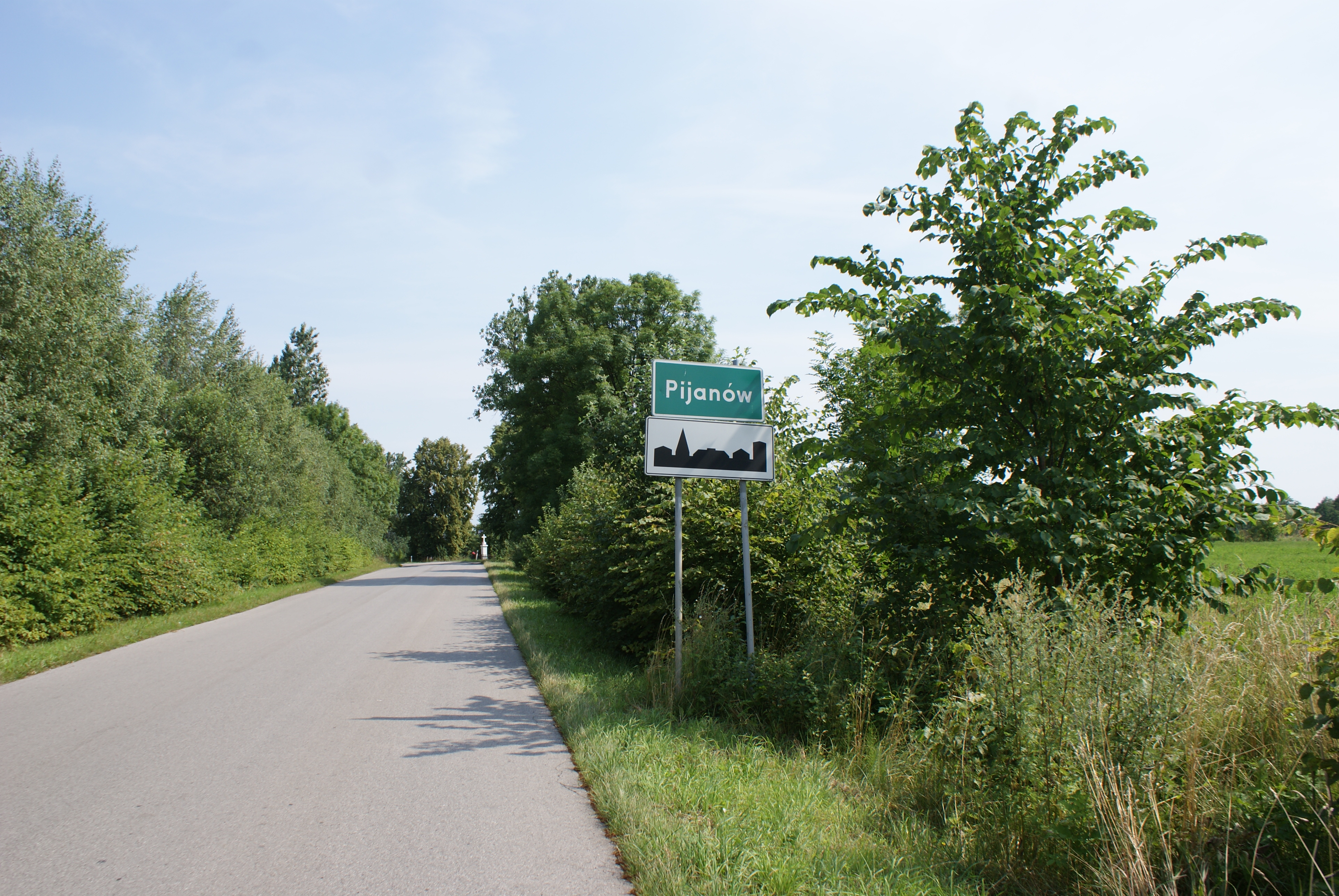

- Location within Poland
- Coordinates: 51°2′6″N 20°10′4″E
- Country: Poland
- Voivodeship: Świętokrzyskie
- County: Końskie
- Gmina: Słupia Konecka
- Population: 180

Pijanów [piˈjanuf] is a village in the administrative district of Gmina Słupia Konecka, within Końskie County, Świętokrzyskie Voivodeship, in south-central Poland. It lies approximately 4 km (2 mi) north-east of Słupia, 26 km (16 mi) south-west of Końskie, and 36 km (22 mi) north-west of the regional capital Kielce.
