= Słupia-Bukowie =

- Settlement
- Location within Poland
- Coordinates: 51°01′11″N 20°07′33″E
- Country: Poland
- Voivodeship: Świętokrzyskie
- County: Końskie
- Gmina: Słupia Konecka

Słupia-Bukowie [ˈswupja buˈkɔvjɛ], also known as Bukowie, is a settlement in the administrative district of Gmina Słupia Konecka, within Końskie County, Świętokrzyskie Voivodeship, in south-central Poland.
