= Jarząb, Świętokrzyskie Voivodeship =

Village in Gmina Radoszyce, Poland

Jarząb
- Village
- Location within Poland
- Coordinates: 51°01′17″N 20°19′51″E
- Country: Poland
- Voivodeship: Świętokrzyskie
- County: Końskie
- Gmina: Radoszyce

Jarząb [ˈjaʐɔmp] is a village in the administrative district of Gmina Radoszyce, within Końskie County, Świętokrzyskie Voivodeship, in south-central Poland.
