= Gruszka, Końskie County =

Gruszka
- Village
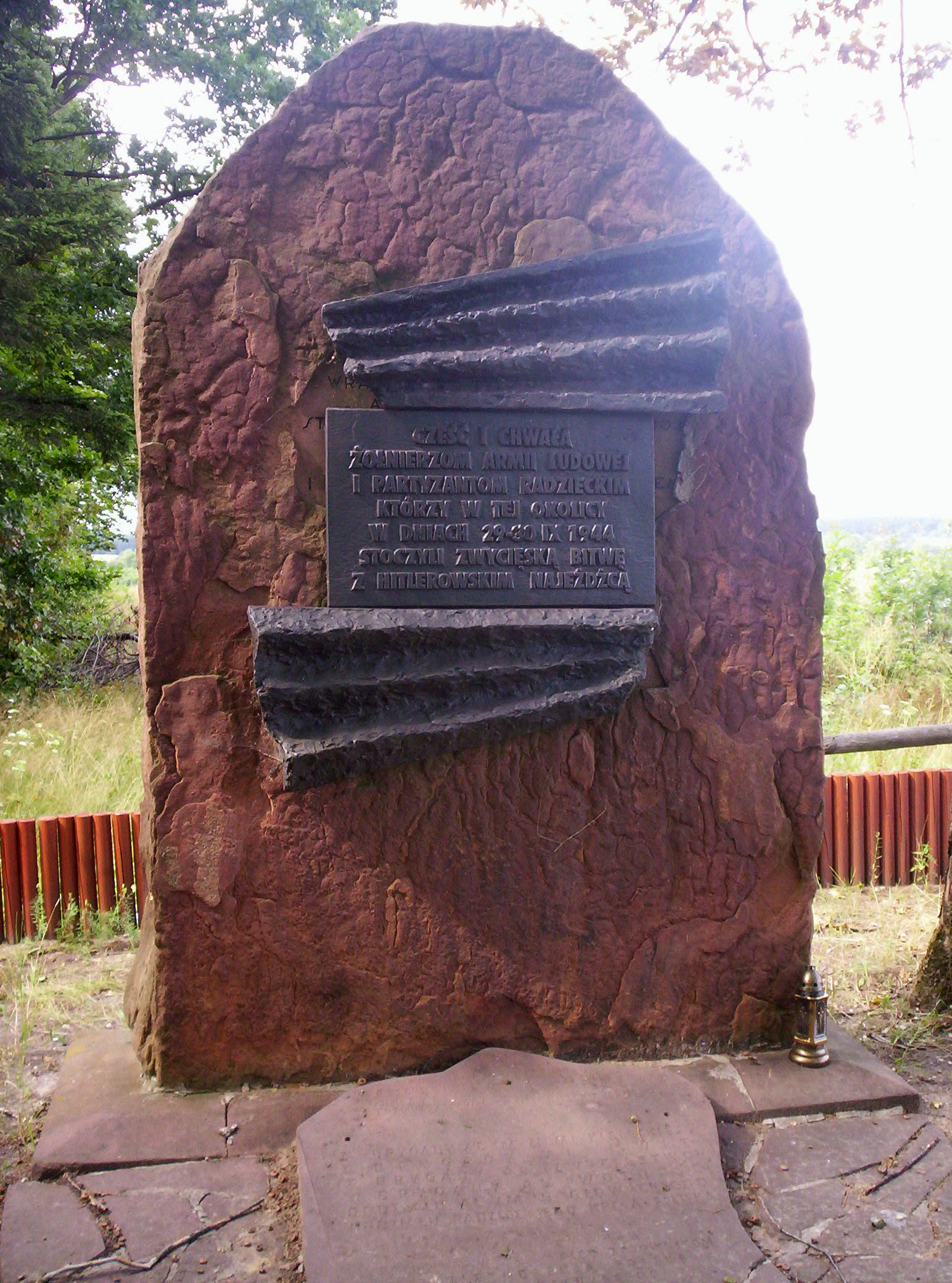

- Location within Poland
- Coordinates: 51°0′1″N 20°17′43″E
- Country: Poland
- Voivodeship: Świętokrzyskie
- County: Końskie
- Gmina: Radoszyce
- Population: 140

Gruszka [ˈɡruʂka] is a village in the administrative district of Gmina Radoszyce, within Końskie County, Świętokrzyskie Voivodeship, in south-central Poland. It lies approximately 9 km (6 mi) south of Radoszyce, 24 km (15 mi) south of Końskie, and 27 km (17 mi) north-west of the regional capital Kielce.
