= Gmina Radoszyce =

Gmina Radoszyce Radoszyce Commune
- Gmina
- Coat of arms
- Interactive map of Gmina Radoszyce
- Coordinates (Radoszyce): 51°4′25″N 20°15′18″E
- Country: Poland
- Voivodeship: Świętokrzyskie
- County: Końskie
- Seat: Radoszyce

Area
  - Total: 146.71 km^{2} (56.65 sq mi)

Population (2006)
  - Total: 9,113
  - Density: 62.12/km^{2} (160.9/sq mi)
- Website: http://www.radoszyce.pl

Gmina Radoszyce is an urban-rural gmina (administrative district) in Końskie County, Świętokrzyskie Voivodeship, in south-central Poland. Its seat is the village of Radoszyce, which lies approximately 19 kilometres (12 mi) south-west of Końskie and 33 km (21 mi) north-west of the regional capital Kielce.

The gmina covers an area of 146.71 square kilometres (56.6 sq mi), and as of 2006 its total population is 9,113.

== Villages ==
Gmina Radoszyce contains the villages and settlements of Filipy, Górniki, Grębosze, Grodzisko, Gruszka, Huta, Jacentów, Jakimowice, Jarząb, Jóźwików, Kaliga, Kapałów, Kłucko, Lewoszów, Łysów, Momocicha, Mościska Duże, Mościska Małe, Mularzów, Nadworów, Nalewajków, Pakuły, Plenna, Podlesie, Radoska, Radoszyce, Salachowy Bór, Sęp, Szóstaki, Węgrzyn, Wilczkowice, Wiosna, Wisy, Wyrębów and Zychy.

== Neighbouring gminas ==
Gmina Radoszyce is bordered by the gminas of Końskie, Łopuszno, Mniów, Ruda Maleniecka, Słupia and Smyków.
