= Radoshitz (Hasidic dynasty) =

Radoshitz, also spelled Radishitz, is the name of a Hasidic dynasty founded by Rebbe Yisochor Ber Baron (1765–1843) of Radoshitz, also known as the Saba Kadisha. He was a student of the Seer of Lublin and of the Maggid of Kozhnitz. He was particularly dedicated to the mitzvah of Kiddush HaChodesh, the sanctification of the month.

Radoshitz is the Yiddish name of Radoszyce, Świętokrzyskie Voivodeship, a town in present-day Poland.

== Lineage ==
- Grand Rabbi Yischar Baer (1765–16-June-1843) of Radoshitz
  - Grand Rabbi Israel Isac (1810–1857), son of Rabbi Yischar Baer
    - Grand Rabbi Yaakov David, son of Rabbi Israel Isac

== History ==
Yischar Baer also known as the "Saba Kadisha" or, holy elder of Radoshitz was featured in the famous account of when he discovered the clock of his late teacher, the Chozeh of Lublin.

== See also ==
- History of the Jews in Poland
