= Słupia, Końskie County =

Słupia
- Village
- Location within Poland
- Coordinates: 51°0′49″N 20°8′27″E
- Country: Poland
- Voivodeship: Świętokrzyskie
- County: Końskie
- Gmina: Słupia Konecka
- Population: 290

Słupia [ˈswupja] is a village in Końskie County, Świętokrzyskie Voivodeship, in south-central Poland. It is the seat of the gmina (administrative district) called Gmina Słupia Konecka. It lies approximately 29 km (18 mi) south-west of Końskie and 37 km (23 mi) north-west of the regional capital Kielce.
