= Radoszyce, Świętokrzyskie Voivodeship =

Town in Świętokrzyskie Voivodeship, Poland

Radoszyce
- Town
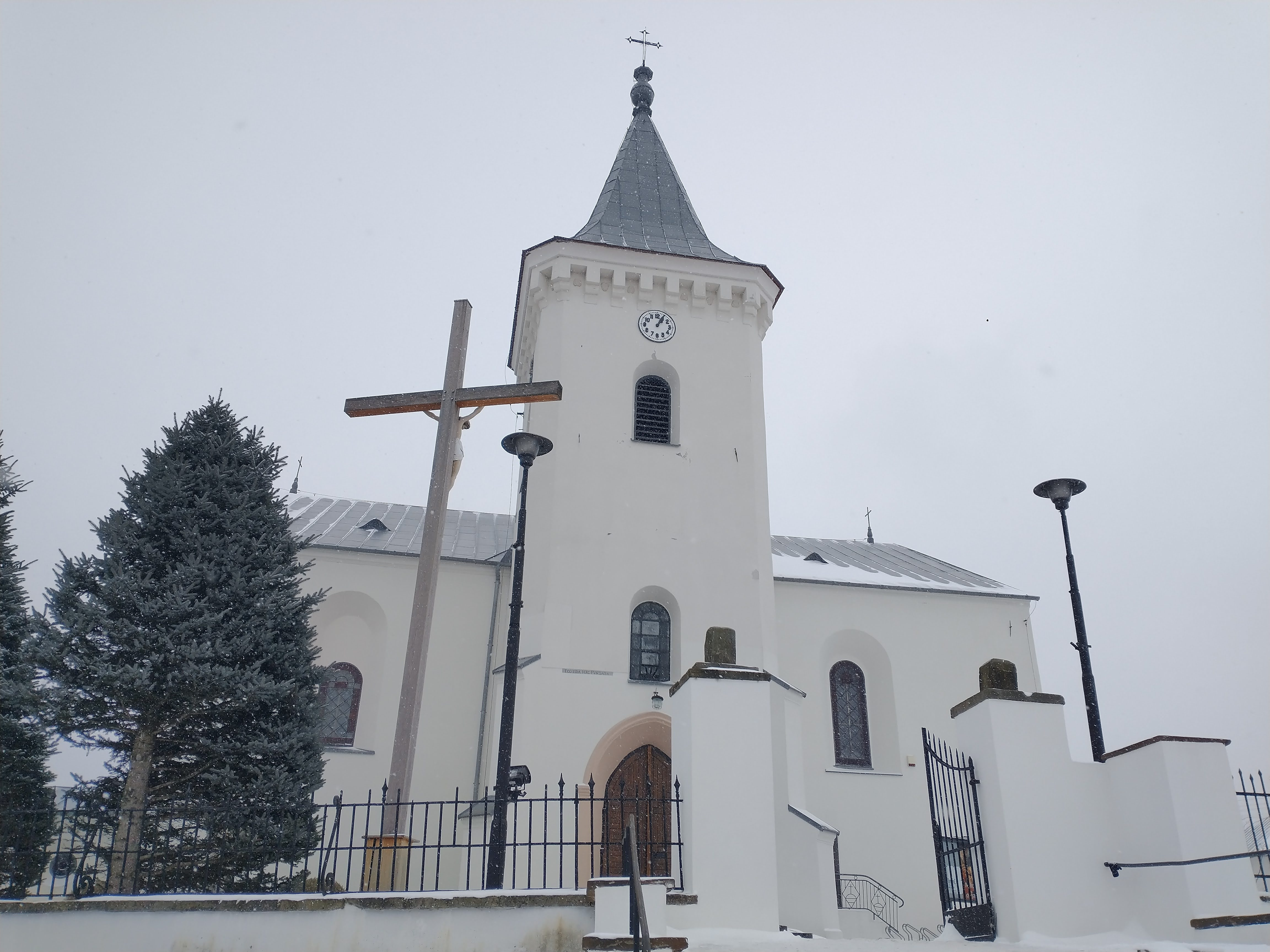
- Saints Peter and Paul church

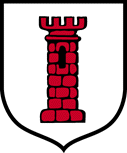
- Coat of arms

- Location within Poland
- Coordinates: 51°4′25″N 20°15′18″E
- Country: Poland
- Voivodeship: Świętokrzyskie
- County: Końskie
- Gmina: Radoszyce

Population
  - Total: 3,400
- Time zone: UTC+1 (CET)
  - Summer (DST): UTC+2 (CEST)
- Postal code: 26–230
- Vehicle registration: TKN
- Website: http://www.radoszyce.pl

Radoszyce ([radɔˈʂɨt͡sɛ]; Yiddish: ראַדאָשיץ) is a town in Końskie County, Świętokrzyskie Voivodeship, in south-central Poland (historic province of Lesser Poland). It is the seat of the gmina (administrative district) called Gmina Radoszyce. It lies approximately 19 km (12 mi) south-west of Końskie and 33 km (21 mi) north-west of the regional capital Kielce.

== History ==
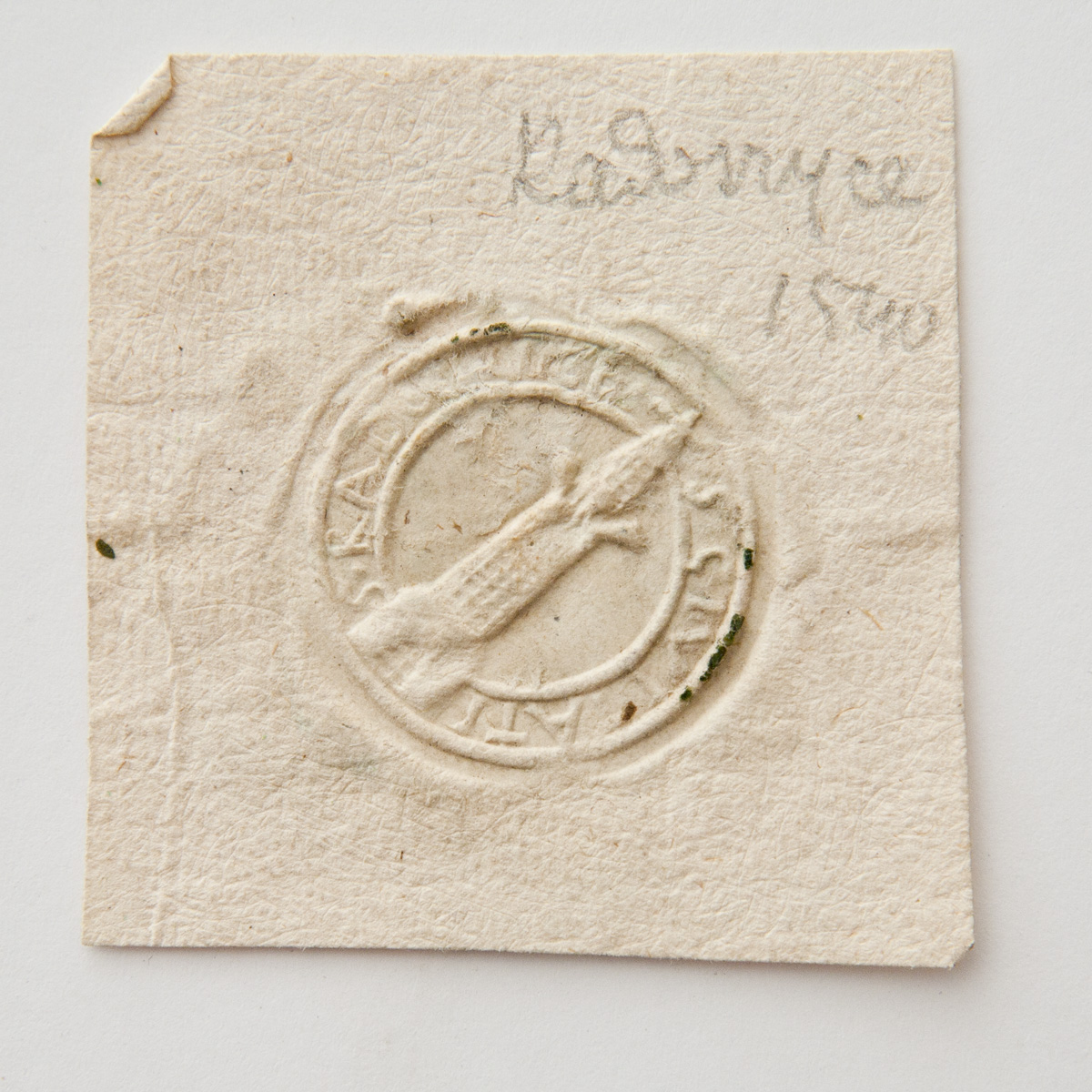
16th-century seal of Radoszyce

Its name probably comes from a man named Jan, the son of Radosz (Radosław), who was mentioned in a 1218 document.

It is not known when Radoszyce received its town rights, most likely it happened during the reign of King Casimir III the Great, probably around 1370. At that time, Radoszyce was located along a merchant road called "via magna", which started at Piotrków Trybunalski, and went towards Lublin and Sandomierz, via Przedbórz, Radoszyce, Chęciny, Kielce, Bodzentyn, Sienno, and Solec nad Wisłą. The parish church of Radoszyce was probably founded in 1364, in a spot where once a hunting chapel of the Piast dynasty princes stood.

In ca. 1369, a royal manor house was built here. In 1411, King Władysław II Jagiełło stayed here for a short time, on his way north to Prussia. Jagiełło visited the town again in 1425, travelling from Greater Poland to Red Ruthenia. Three years later, the king decided to change Radoszyce's town charter from obsolete Polish regulations to the more modern Magdeburg rights. Jagiełło allowed Radoszyce to make two fairs a year. In 1450, another Polish king, Casimir IV Jagiellon, stayed here with his daughters. Radoszyce was a royal town of the Kingdom of Poland, administratively located in the Chęciny County in the Sandomierz Voivodeship in the Lesser Poland Province. Nearby villages of Radoska and Grodzisko were regarded as Radoszyce's suburbs.

Radoszyce was destroyed and its population decimated in the Swedish invasion of Poland (1655–1660). After the wars, Jewish people began to settle here, which resulted in frequent clashes with local Christian population.

In 1740, town council banned residents from selling their houses to Jews. In the late Middle Ages, the area of Radoszyce emerged as a center of Polish industry, due to proximity of large forests, which provided timber for fuel. In 1781, Jacek Małachowski founded a blast furnace in a village of Antoniow near Radoszyce. It quickly emerged as a main producer of armaments in the Polish–Lithuanian Commonwealth. In 1787, it was visited by King Stanisław August Poniatowski, who wanted to inspect local iron plants.

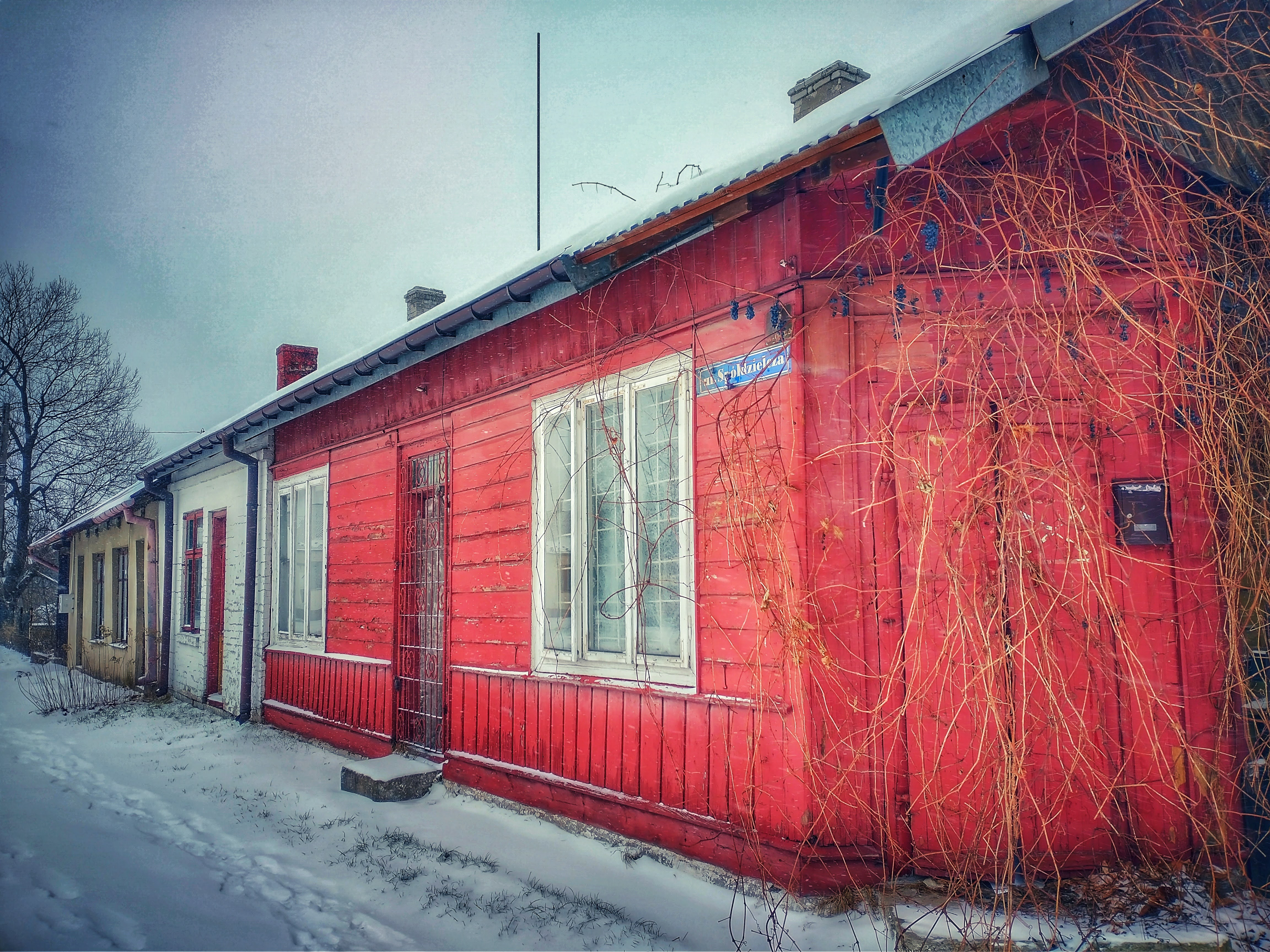
Preserved old houses

On 18 November 1794, the last remaining Lithuanian units of the Kościuszko Uprising, which were under the command of Romuald Giedroyć, surrendered to the Russians in Radoszyce.

After the Third Partition of Poland, Radoszyce was first seized by the Habsburg Empire. After the Polish victory in the Austro-Polish War of 1809, it was regained by Poles and included within the short-lived Duchy of Warsaw, and after its dissolution, in 1815–1915, it belonged to the Russian-controlled Congress Poland. In 1821, after the death of Jacek Małachowski, Radoszyce became the property of the government. Following the plant designed by Stanisław Staszic, the area of Końskie and Radoszyce was designed to become a major center of industry, as Old-Polish Industrial Region. In 1823, a large blast furnace was opened at Samsonów. Radoszyce also received a new blast furnace (1824), but it burned in 1839 and was never rebuilt. After the January Uprising, local industry declined, also due to the fact that major railroads missed Radoszyce.

In 1827, the population of Radoszyce was 1,425, with 252 houses. By 1858, the population grew to 1,934, but together with other locations in northern Lesser Poland Radoszyce lost its town charter after the January Uprising (1869).

In 1905, the population of the village was 5,379, with a significant Jewish minority. In the Second Polish Republic, Radoszyce belonged to Kielce Voivodeship, and remained a poor village, whose residents supported themselves by trade, agriculture and services.

=== World War II ===
In the late autumn of 1939, after the Invasion of Poland, the unit of Major Henryk Dobrzański operated in the area of Radoszyce. Local Home Army units were commanded by Jan Stoiński, who was later replaced by Jan Pacak. In the late 1941 and early 1942, Jews of Radoszyce were murdered by Germans in the Holocaust. Since the village was a major center of Polish resistance, German occupiers decided to take their revenge on its population. On September 3–4, 1944, Radoszyce was surrounded by the Wehrmacht. All residents were ordered to gather in the market square, and Germans began the massacre. They managed to kill 19 residents, when local Home Army units attacked the Wehrmacht, forcing it to retreat. After the battle, however, the village was completely destroyed. On September 29, 1944, near the village of Gruszka, one of the largest battles of Polish resistance took place.

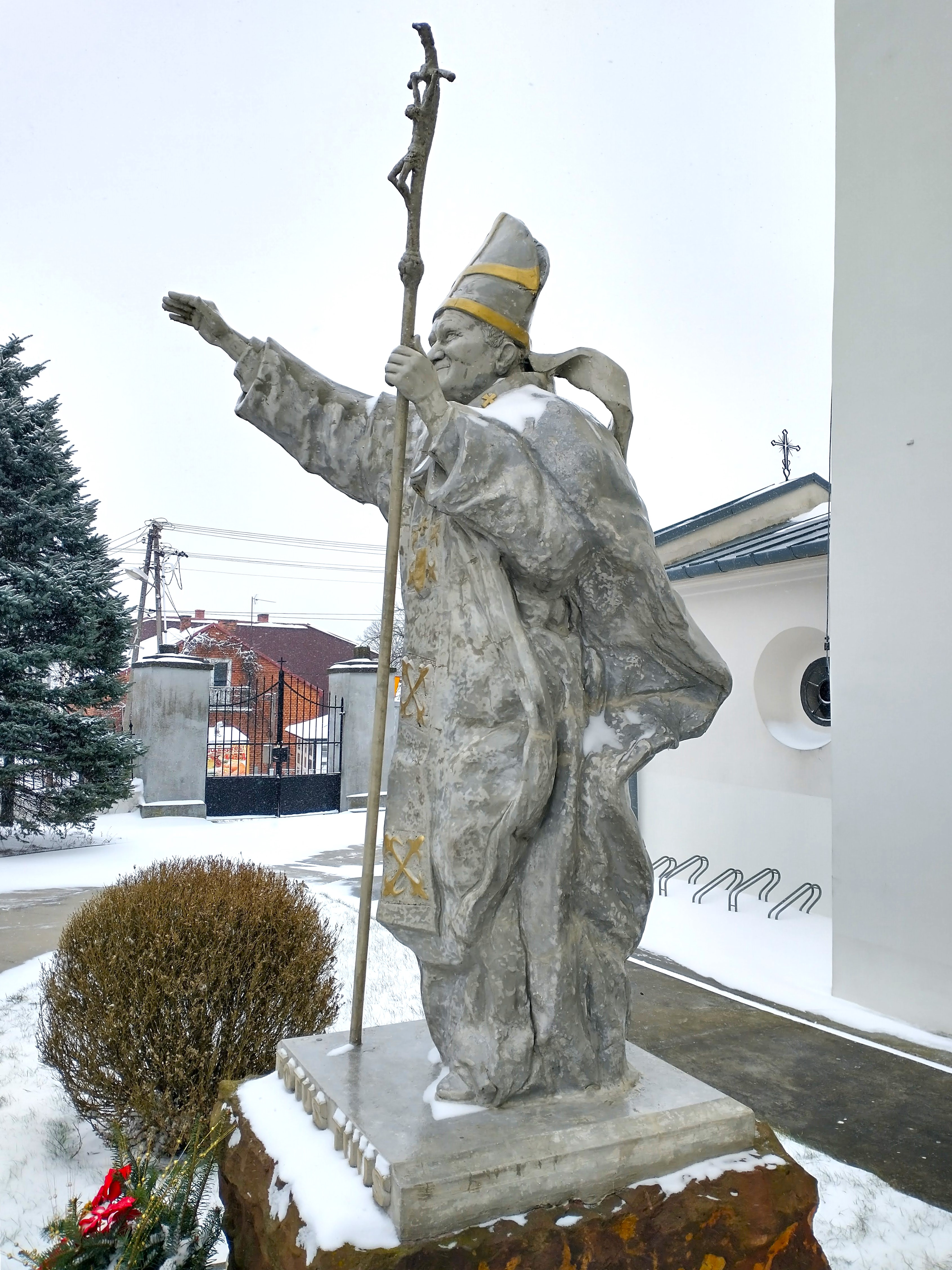
Pope John Paul II monument

== Transport ==
Radoszyce is bypassed by voivodeship road 728 to the east.

The nearest railway station is in Końskie to the north.

== Famous people born in Radoszyce ==
- Yisochor Ber Baron (Yiddish: רבי יִשָּׂשכָר בער באַראָן 1765–1843), the 1st "Radoshitzer Rebbe" (Yiddish: ראַדאָשיצער רבי), founder of the Radoshitz (Hasidic dynasty)
- Aleksander Derszniak, starosta
- Stanislav (Kasparovich) Eksner (Echsner, Exner), Polish: Stanisław Eksner (Exner) (1859, Radoszyce – after 1921), a Polish-Russian musician and music educator
- Mikołaj Ossoliński, starosta
- Stanisław Zajączkowski, painter

== Sources ==
- Ivinskis, Zenonas; Biržiška, Vaclovas (1956). "Romualdas Giedraitis". Lietuvių Enciklopedija (in Lithuanian). Vol. 7. United States of America.
- "Local history". Virtual Shtetl.
