= Komorów and Krasna massacre =

1939 Wehrmacht war crime during the Invasion of Poland

- Part of Invasion of Poland
- Location: 51°04′28″N 20°31′32″E; Komorów, Końskie County, Krasna, Świętokrzyskie Voivodeship
- Date: 6 September 1939
- Injuries: 4 people
- Victim: 28 people
- Perpetrators: Nazi Germany, 13. Infanterie-Division (motorisiert)

Komorów and Krasna massacre was a war crime committed by soldiers of the German Wehrmacht on 6 September 1939, during World War II, in the villages of Komorów and Krasna in the Kielce region.

On that day, a battle was fought near Krasna, in which the Germans suffered heavy losses. In retaliation, on the same day, soldiers of the 13th Motorized Infantry Division pacified Krasna, as well as neighbouring Komorów. Twenty-eight civilians died at their hands, including many women and children. The Germans burnt down Komorów, even though the village was not directly involved in combat operations.

== Course ==
On 5 September 1939, in the afternoon, first German armoured fighting vehicles appeared in the vicinity of Komorów and Krasna. On that day, many residents fled their homes, seeking shelter in neighbouring villages.

On 6 September 1939, a fierce battle took place near Krasna between elements of the Polish 12th Infantry Division (1st battalion of the 9th Legions' Infantry Regiment, 1st battery of 12th Light Artillery Regiment) and the German 13th Motorized Infantry Division. (Note: After Jochen Böhler (see Böhler (2009, p. 105–106.)). Polish sources, however, state that the German 2nd Light Division fought at Krasna. See Zarzycki (1998, p. 23.).) The Germans then suffered heavy losses, losing, among others, several tanks. As a result of German artillery fire, Krasna went up in flames. Some residents of Komorów and Krasna, who had not evacuated the previous day, sought shelter in the surrounding forests. However, many remained on their farms.

After breaking the Polish resistance, the Germans committed crimes against the civilian population. Victims were shot, stabbed with bayonets or beaten to death with rifle butts. Grenades were thrown into cellars and buildings. They were also thrown into pits and depressions in the area where civilians were hiding.

Komorów was set on fire with incendiary shells – without any connection to the ongoing combat operations. The Germans murdered 18 people there, including six men, five women and seven children under the age of 15. The oldest victim was 70 years old, the youngest 2 years old. Among others, seven members of the Supierz family were murdered.

My brother Antoni reached that soldier, began to beg him and kiss his legs. [Soldier] ordered him to step back three steps and pierced him with a bayonet. My other brother, Stefan, hid behind the corpses of our sisters Maria and Krystyna, who had been killed. A German from a machine-gun position let off a burst at him. My brother was wounded three times in the head and received a bullet under his right collarbone [...] My mother, together with my three-year-old brother, whom she hid under her skirt, started to ask for a sparing of life. She was shot in the stomach, and my brother Edward - hidden by her - in the head. Mum was shot in the lower abdomen and legs. My uncle's sister, Janina, was also stabbed with a bayonet.

— Władysław Supierz, a survivor of the Komorovo massacre, Szymon Datner (1967) 55 dni Wehrmachtu w Polsce. Zbrodnie dokonane na polskiej ludności cywilnej w okresie 1.IX – 25.X. 1939 r. Warszawa: Wydawnictwo MON, p. 258.

In Krasna, 10 people were murdered, including two women. Five of the victims were Jewish. Thus, a total of 28 people were murdered in both villages. (Note: According to another source, the Germans murdered 27 people that day, including 19 inhabitants of Komorowo, five inhabitants of Krasna and three Polish Prisoners of War. The latter were to be killed on the road from Mniów to Krasna. See Fajkowski & Religa (1981, p. 106–107.))

In Komorów, three seriously injured people survived the execution. In Krasna, an 8-year-old girl was wounded. Several inhabitants of Komorów and Krasna were joined to a group of about fifteen Polish Prisoners of War and rushed towards Mniów. On the way, they were lined up several times to be shot, but the execution did not take place. Eventually, they were all taken to Łopuszno. Still on 6 September or the following day the civilians were released to their homes.

When the civilians in question were led towards Mniów, they were accused of firing at German soldiers during the would-be executions. Similar accusations can be found in the war diary of a German military doctor from the 101st Infantry Regiment, accessed by Jochen Böhler. However, there is no evidence of any active participation of the civilian population in the fighting over the Krasna River. The pacification of the two villages was therefore probably an act of revenge for the losses suffered by the Germans in this battle.

== Bibliography ==
- Böhler, Jochen (2009). Zbrodnie Wehrmachtu w Polsce [Wehrmacht crimes in Poland] (in Polish). Kraków: Wydawnictwo „Znak”. ISBN 978-83-240-1225-1.
- Datner, Szymon (1967). 55 dni Wehrmachtu w Polsce. Zbrodnie dokonane na polskiej ludności cywilnej w okresie 1.IX – 25.X. 1939 r. [55 days of the Wehrmacht in Poland. Crimes committed against the Polish civilian population in the period September 1 – October 25, 1939] (in Polish). Warszawa: Wydawnictwo MON.
- Fajkowski, Józef; Religa, Jan (1981). Zbrodnie hitlerowskie na wsi polskiej 1939–1945 [Nazi crimes in the Polish countryside 1939–1945] (in Polish). Warszawa: Książka i Wiedza.
- Rejestr miejsc i faktów zbrodni popełnionych przez okupanta hitlerowskiego na ziemiach polskich w latach 1939–1945. Województwo kieleckie [Register of places and facts of crimes committed by the Nazi Occupier on Polish Lands in the years 1939–1945. Kielce Voivodeship] (in Polish). Warszawa: Ministerstwo Sprawiedliwości. Główna Komisja Badania Zbrodni Hitlerowskich w Polsce. 1980.
- Zarzycki, Piotr (1998). 12 Kresowy pułk artylerii lekkiej [12th Kresy Light Artillery Regiment]. Zarys historii wojennej pułków polskich w kampanii wrześniowej. Zeszyt nr 59. (in Polish). Pruszków: Oficyna Wydawnicza Ajaks. ISBN 83-87103-09-8.
