= Duracz =

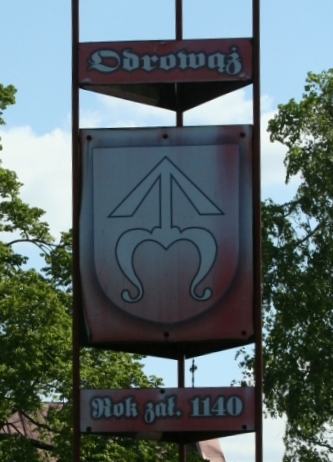
Odrowąż coat of arms in the village of Odrowąż

The Duracz family (eng. Durach, rus./ukr. Дурач) is a Polish szlachta family bearing the Odrowąż coat of arms.

== Name spelling ==
The original Polish spelling is Duracz. A large part of the family moved to Podolia in the 18th century, which with time became a part of Russia, now Ukraine. Russian as well as Ukrainian spelling of the last name is Дурач. In most cases it is transliterated back into Latin as Durach, not preserving the original Polish spelling. Note that there is a German last name Durach, which should not be confused with the name of the descendants of the Duracz family of Russian or Ukrainian background.

== Early origins ==
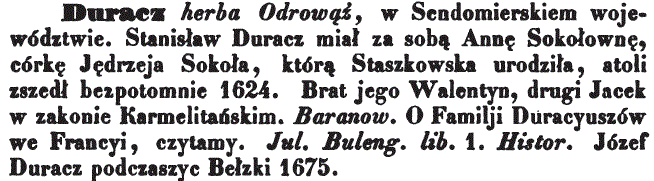
The Duracz family in the "Herbarz Polski" by Kasper Niesiecki (see or).

The Duracz family (eng. Durach, rus./ukr. Дурач) is a Polish szlachta family, which has its roots in the Świętokrzyskie Province of Poland in the 16th and 17th centuries. At the time the Duracz family was well known as blacksmiths and operators (some times founders) of numerous forges around which new villages appeared, two of which in Duraczów in Końskie County and Duraczów in Kielce County bear the family name to modern days. The city of Skarżysko-Kamienna has grown around the forge founded by the Duracz family in 1511, which until the end of the 17th century was called interchangeably as Kamionna and Duracz. Another notable forge was located at Krynki near Brody.

Z licznych rodów kuźniczych w Sandomierszczyźnie należy wymienić przede wszystkim Duraczów, których widzimy jako kuźników w wielu oddalonych nawet od siebie kuźnicach Zagłębia Staropolskiego: Szałaskiej i Duraczowskiej w powiecie opoczyńskim, Smiłowskiej i Brod w radomskim, Krzyneckiej i Jaśkowickiej w sandomierskim.

— Bandania z Dziejow Rzemiosla i Handlu w Epoce Feudalizmu, Volume I

== Walenty Duracz from Kamiona and his family ==
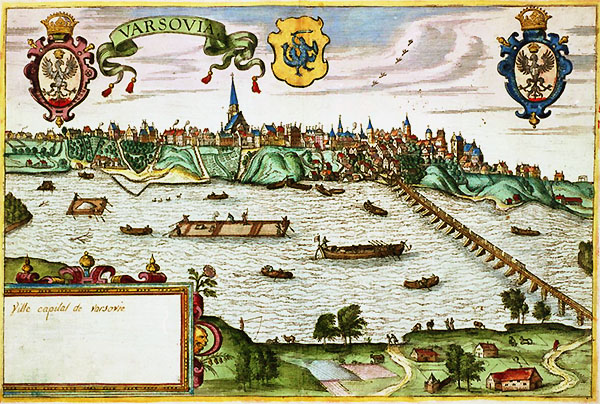
View of Warsaw in 1617 with the bridge of Zygmunt August

In 1578 the Duracz family was introduced into the Odrowąż clan (see the list of families at the clan article) through the ennoblement of Walenty Duracz from Kamiona (lat. Valentinus Duracz de Kamiona) by the Polish king Stefan Batory for playing one of the leading roles in the construction of the first bridge in Warsaw - the Bridge of Zygmunt August.

"In the beginning of the seventeenth century a malicious neighbor charged a certain Walenty Duracz with using unlawfully the crest of the Odrowaz clan. The suspicion was unfounded, for Duracz had been legally ennobled by the Seym in 1578. The informer only reported that Duracz, the owner of forges, "made cannon balls for King Stefan against Moscow ... also hoes and spades," that he bought with the proceeds of that trade the village of Sadek near Sandomierz and became a squire. And before making artillery ammunition, he had supplied iron for the famous Vistula bridge near Warsaw."

— Paweł Jasienica, The Commonwealth of Both Nations: Silver age

Following the ennoblement Walenty was able to purchase the village of Sadek near Szydłowiec. Walenty with his wife Katarzyna had several children including Andrzej, Walenty, Wojciech Zygmunt and Mikolaj. After the death of Walenty his wife was living in Szydłowiec.

One of Walenty's sons, Zygmunt Duracz (lat. Sigismundo Duracz) has been a szafarz at the court of Stefan Batory.

Another son of Walenty, also named Walenty Duracz, moved from the family residence at Kamiona to Kielce and became an owner of several forges as well as the village Dąbrowa in the Kielce area (see the history section of the article on Dąbrowa).
