= Bien =

Bien may refer to:

- Bien (newspaper)
- Bień, Poland
- "Bien", a song by Tini from Un Mechón de Pelo
- Gertrud Bien (1881–1940), Austrian pediatrician
- Bien-Aimé Baraza (born 1987), Kenyan musician
- Basic Income Earth Network (BIEN)
