= Piasek (disambiguation) =

Piasek (meaning "sand" in Polish) is a large village in Silesian Voivodeship, southern Poland.

Piasek may also refer to:

- Piasek, Częstochowa County in Silesian Voivodeship
- Piasek, Lubliniec County in Silesian Voivodeship
- Piasek, Subcarpathian Voivodeship (south-east Poland)
- Piasek, Świętokrzyskie Voivodeship (south-central Poland)
- Piasek, Warmian-Masurian Voivodeship (north Poland)
- Piasek, West Pomeranian Voivodeship (north-west Poland)
- Piasek, former district of Kraków, part of the District I Old Town of Kraków
- Abram "Abe" Piasek (1928–2020), Polish-American Holocaust survivor
- Andrzej Piaseczny, Polish singer, commonly called "Piasek"
