= Wólka Zychowa =

- Village
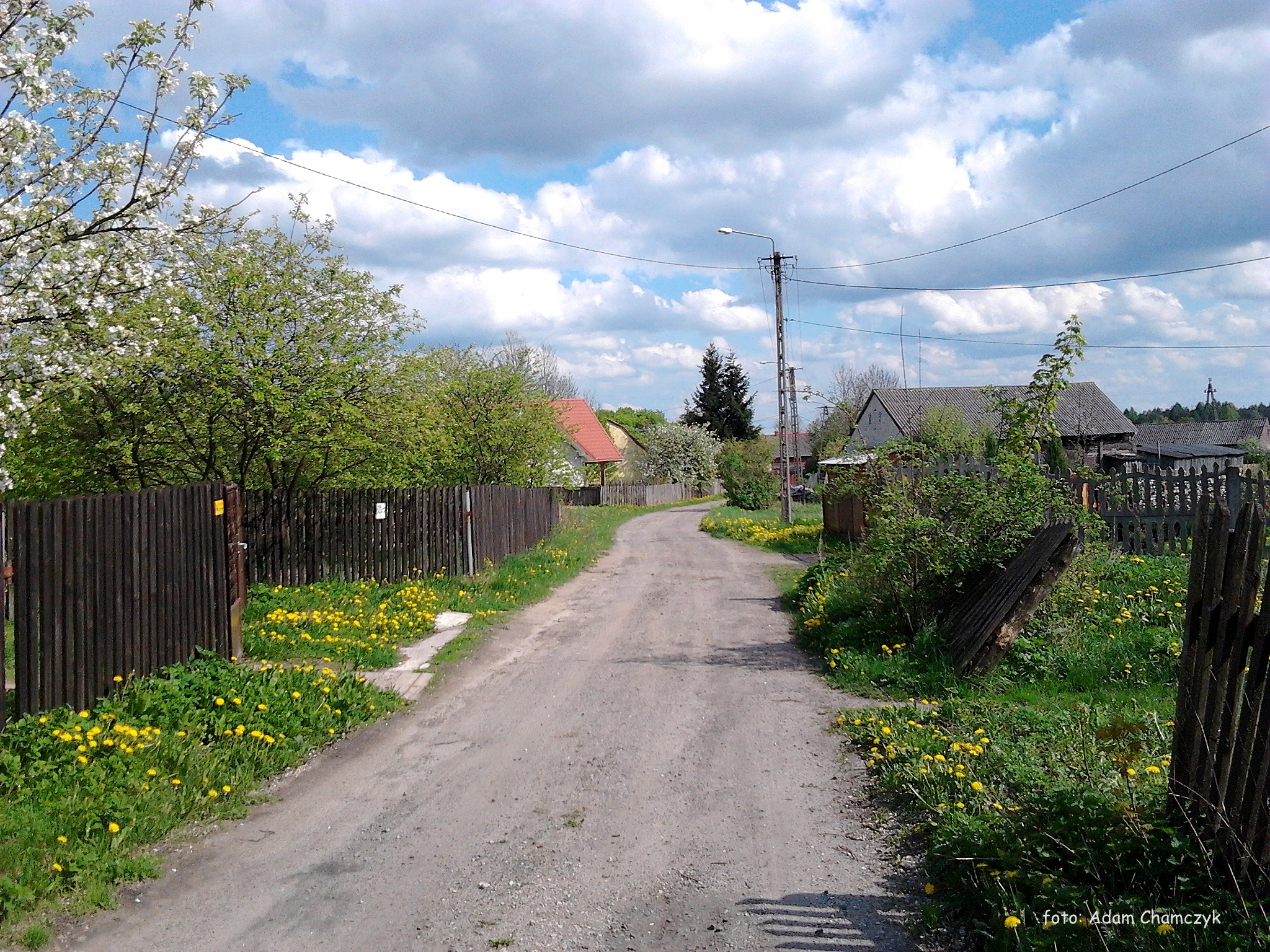

- Location within Poland
- Coordinates: 51°13′2″N 20°35′40″E
- Country: Poland
- Voivodeship: Świętokrzyskie
- County: Końskie
- Gmina: Stąporków
- Population: 420

Wólka Zychowa [ˈvulka zɨˈxɔva] is a village in the administrative district of Gmina Stąporków, within Końskie County, Świętokrzyskie Voivodeship, in south-central Poland. It lies approximately 9 km (6 mi) north-east of Stąporków, 13 km (8 mi) east of Końskie, and 38 km (24 mi) north of the regional capital Kielce.
