= Wólka Plebańska, Świętokrzyskie Voivodeship =

Wólka Plebańska
- Village
- Location within Poland
- Coordinates: 51°9′1″N 20°38′26″E
- Country: Poland
- Voivodeship: Świętokrzyskie
- County: Końskie
- Gmina: Stąporków
- Population: 500

Wólka Plebańska [ˈvulka plɛˈbaɲska] is a village in the administrative district of Gmina Stąporków, within Końskie County, Świętokrzyskie Voivodeship, in south-central Poland. It lies approximately 7 km (4 mi) east of Stąporków, 17 km (11 mi) east of Końskie, and 30 km (19 mi) north of the regional capital Kielce.
