= Henryk Piętek =

Polish brigadier general of Citizen's Militia

- Nickname: Gigant
- Born: 5 January 1922; Pardołów, Second Polish Republic
- Died: 5 April 2015 (aged 93) Konstancin-Jeziorna, Poland
- Buried: Powązki Military Cemetery
- Allegiance: Polish People's Republic
- Branch: People's Guard; People's Army; Milicja Obywatelska; Ministry of Internal Affairs
- Service years: 1943-1974
- Rank: Generał brygady (Brigadier general)
- Conflicts: Second World War
- Awards
- Other work: Undersecretary in Ministry of Forestry and Timber Industry

Henryk Piętek (5 January 1922 - 5 April 2015) was a Polish officer of Milicja Obywatelska and Security Service with the rank of brigadier general.

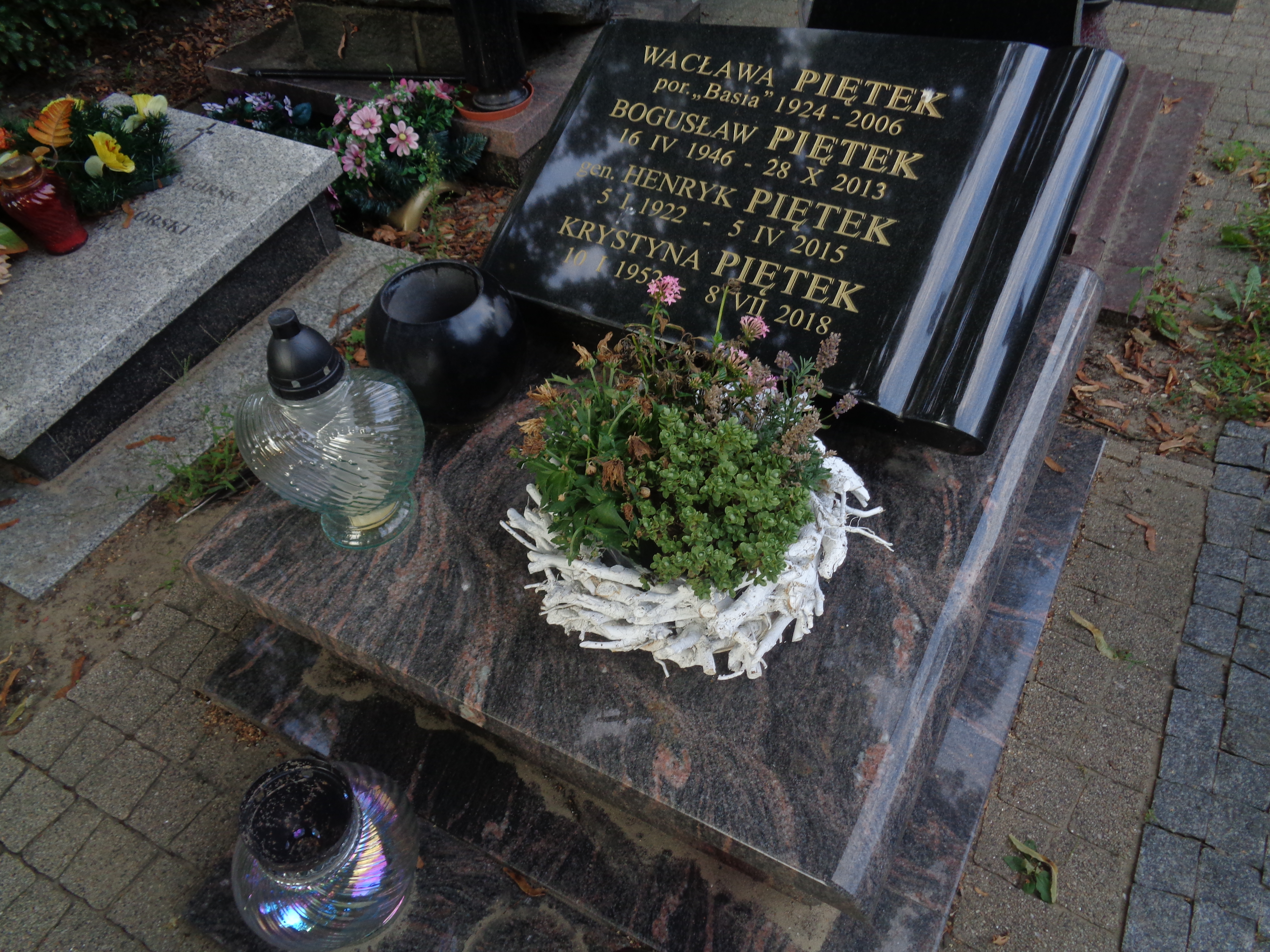
The grave of gen. Henryk Piątek at the Powązki Military Cemetery in Warsaw

== Biography ==
He was born in Pardołów as a son of Antonii and Józefa. During the Second World War he was a member of the Home Army. He deserted in 1943 and joined People's Guard. He was a member of the unit commanded by Mieczysław Moczar, which operated near Kielce. After the end of the war he joined Citizen's Militia (Milicja Obywatelska) and Polish Workers' Party, which was later transformed into Polish United Workers' Party. In 1947 he finished a course for security office commanders, which was held in Legionowo. In the same year he was appointed head of the District Security Office in Piotrków Trybunalski. He held this position until 1951, when he was transferred to Poznań, where he was acting deputy head of the local Security Office. In 1954, he began his service in Wrocław, where he served until 1961, reaching the position of second deputy commander for security. From 1962 he served in the Ministry of Internal Affairs, of which he was deputy minister in 1971-1974. In October 1971, by resolution of the Council of State of the Polish People's Republic, he was promoted to the rank of brigadier general of the Citizens' Militia. In 1974 he ended his career in the Security Service and started working in Ministry of Forestry and Timber Industry on the position of undersecretary. He retired in 1980. He died on April 23, 2017 and was buried at the Powązki Military Cemetery.

== Awards and decorations ==
- Commander's Cross with Star of the Order of Polonia Restituta
- Medal of Ludwik Waryński (1986)

== Bibliography ==
- IPN Catalogue Henryk Piętek's data from the IPN catalogue of party and state management positions in the Polish People's Republic
- T. Mołdawa, "People of Power 1944-1991. State and Political Authorities of Poland as of 28 February 1991", Wydawnictwo Naukowe PWN, Warsaw, 1991 (in Polish)
