= Świerczów, Świętokrzyskie Voivodeship =

Świerczów
- Village
- Location within Poland
- Coordinates: 51°6′54″N 20°37′41″E
- Country: Poland
- Voivodeship: Świętokrzyskie
- County: Końskie
- Gmina: Stąporków
- Population: 530

Świerczów (Polish pronunciation: [ˈɕfjɛrt͡ʂuf]) is a village in the administrative district of Gmina Stąporków, within Końskie County, Świętokrzyskie Voivodeship, in south-central Poland. It lies approximately 7 km (4 mi) south-east of Stąporków, 18 km (11 mi) south-east of Końskie, and 26 km (16 mi) north of the regional capital Kielce.
