= Kozia Wola =

Kozia Wola may refer to the following places:

- Kozia Wola, Lublin Voivodeship (east Poland)
- Kozia Wola, Masovian Voivodeship (east-central Poland)
- Kozia Wola, Świętokrzyskie Voivodeship (south-central Poland)
