= Luta =

Luta may refer to:

- The former name of a Chinese city formed by the agglomeration of Lushun and Dalian (Dairen); the city is now called Dalian (Dairen)
- Chamoru name for Rota in the Mariana Islands
- Luta, Lublin Voivodeship (east Poland)
- Luta, Świętokrzyskie Voivodeship (south-central Poland)
- Lütä, village in Võru County, Estonia
- Liuta (river) or Liutianka, a river in Ukraine, a tributary of Uzh River
- Luţa, a village in Beclean Commune, Braşov County, Romania
- LUTA Sportswear, a sportswear brand which gives half its profits to Fight for Peace
- Luta -Lakota for the color red or crimson. Lakota is one of three languages spoken by the Oceti Sakowin Sioux Tribes that are indigenous to the United States.
