= Czarna, Końskie County =

Czarna
- Village
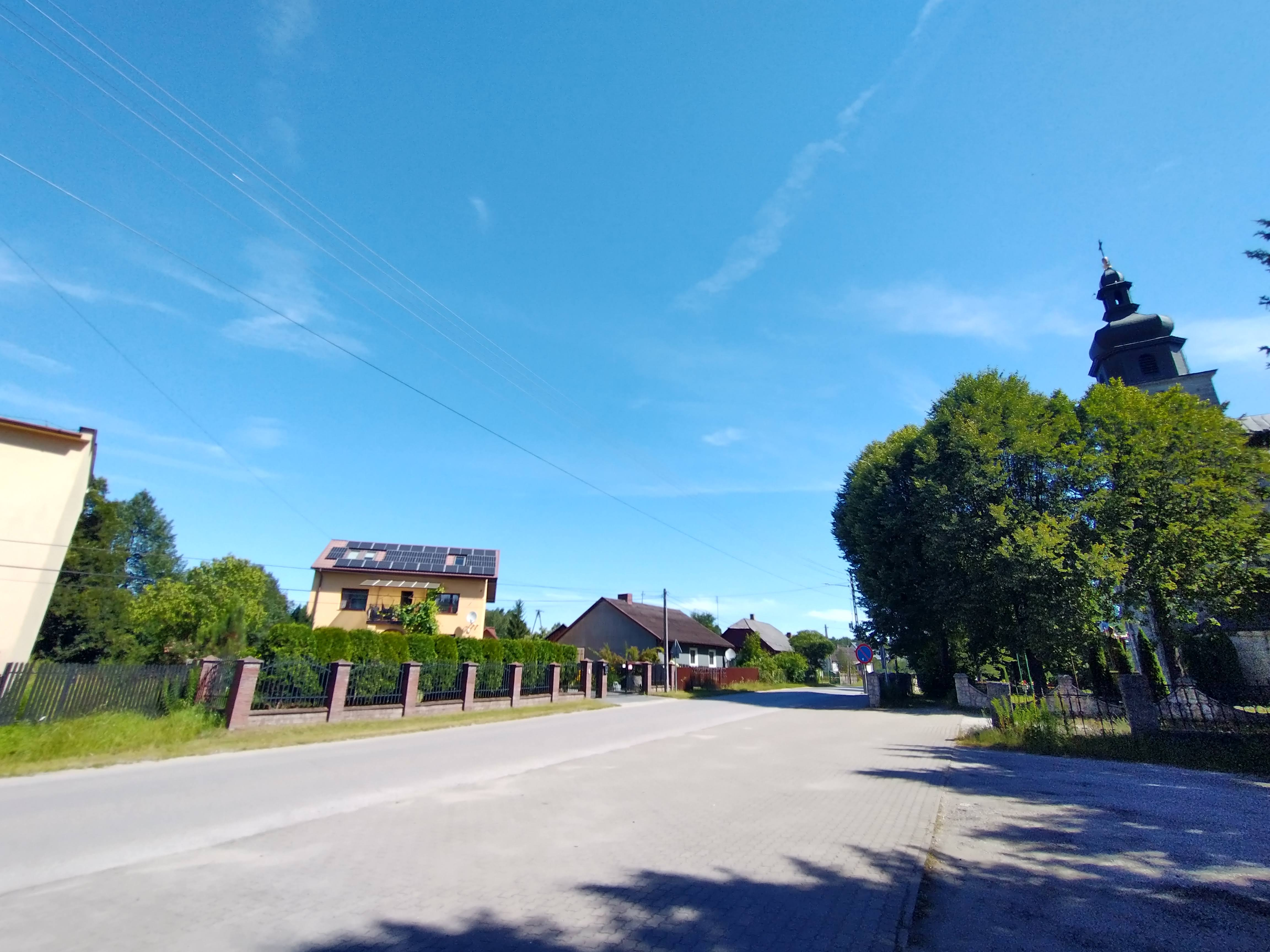

- Location within Poland
- Coordinates: 51°8′26″N 20°31′2″E
- Country: Poland
- Voivodeship: Świętokrzyskie
- County: Końskie
- Gmina: Stąporków
- Population: 330

Czarna [ˈt͡ʂarna] is a village in the administrative district of Gmina Stąporków, within Końskie County, Świętokrzyskie Voivodeship, in south-central Poland. It lies approximately 3 km (2 mi) south-west of Stąporków, 10 km (6 mi) south-east of Końskie, and 30 km (19 mi) north of the regional capital Kielce.
