= Niekłań Mały =

- Village
- Location within Poland
- Coordinates: 51°10′9″N 20°37′4″E
- Country: Poland
- Voivodeship: Świętokrzyskie
- County: Końskie
- Gmina: Stąporków
- Population: 830

Niekłań Mały (Polish pronunciation: [ˈɲɛkwaj̃ ˈmawɨ]) is a village in the administrative district of Gmina Stąporków, within Końskie County, Świętokrzyskie Voivodeship, in south-central Poland. It lies approximately 6 km (4 mi) north-east of Stąporków, 15 km (9 mi) east of Końskie, and 32 km (20 mi) north of the regional capital Kielce.
