= Gosań, Świętokrzyskie Voivodeship =

Gosań
- Village
- Location within Poland
- Coordinates: 51°5′33″N 20°34′19″E
- Country: Poland
- Voivodeship: Świętokrzyskie
- County: Końskie
- Gmina: Stąporków
- Population: 650

Gosań [ˈɡɔsaɲ] is a village in the administrative district of Gmina Stąporków, within Końskie County, Świętokrzyskie Voivodeship, in south-central Poland. It lies approximately 7 km (4 mi) south of Stąporków, 17 km (11 mi) south-east of Końskie, and 24 km (15 mi) north of the regional capital Kielce.
