= Wielka Wieś, Końskie County =

Wielka Wieś
- Village
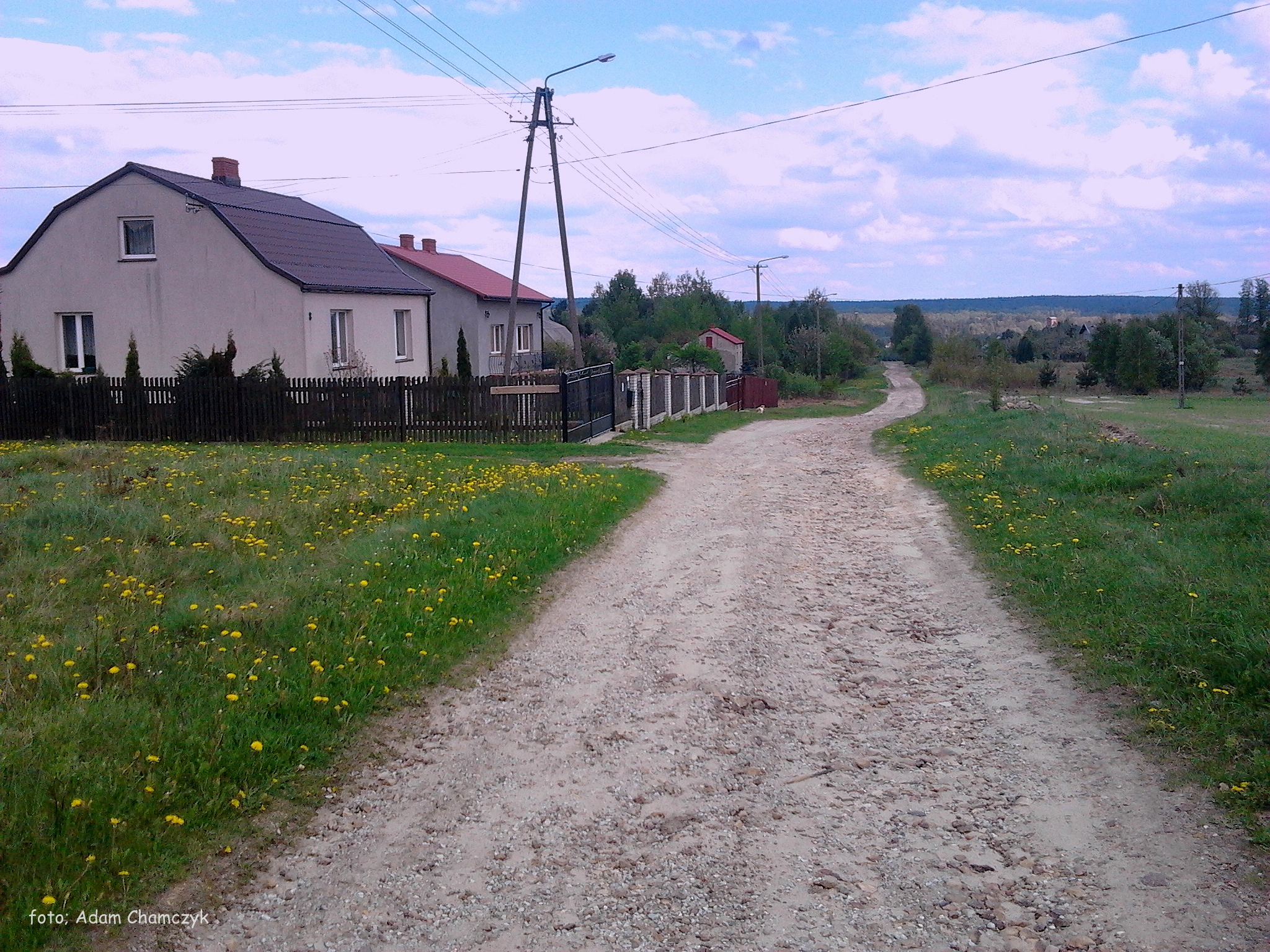

- Location within Poland
- Coordinates: 51°11′37″N 20°35′46″E
- Country: Poland
- Voivodeship: Świętokrzyskie
- County: Końskie
- Gmina: Stąporków
- Population: 650

Wielka Wieś [ˈvjɛlka ˈvjɛɕ] is a village in the administrative district of Gmina Stąporków, within Końskie County, Świętokrzyskie Voivodeship, in south-central Poland. It lies approximately 6 km (4 mi) north-east of Stąporków, 13 km (8 mi) east of Końskie, and 35 km (22 mi) north of the regional capital Kielce.
