= Furmanów =

- Village
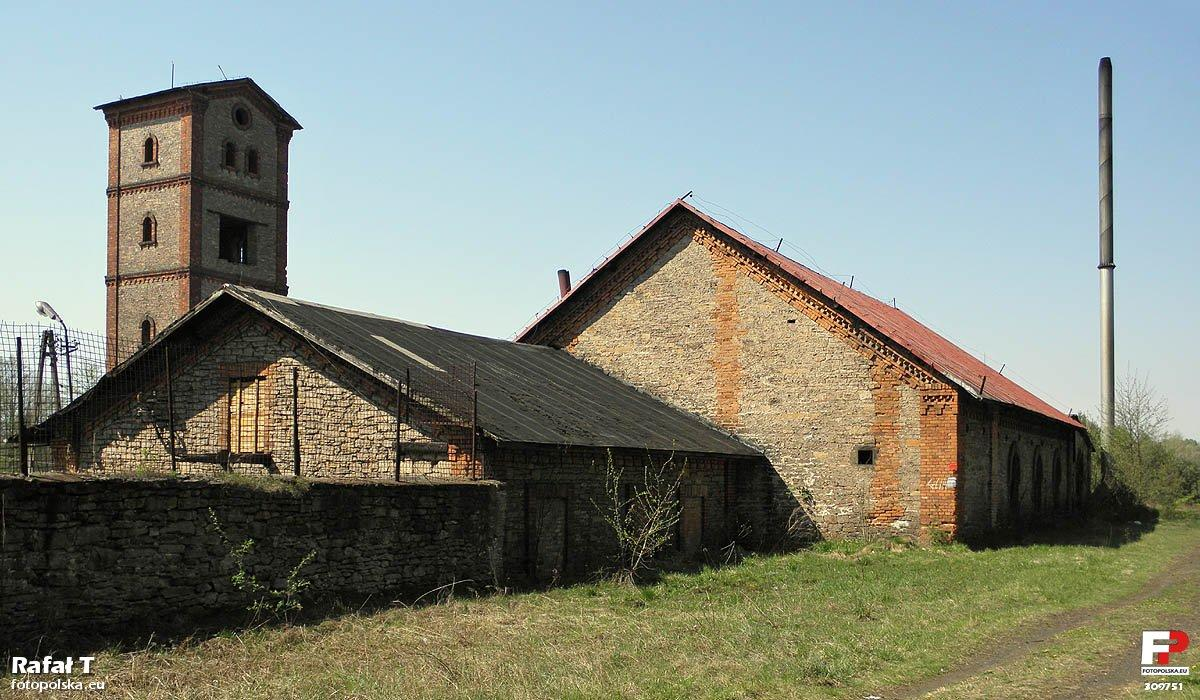

- Location within Poland
- Coordinates: 51°11′27″N 20°36′47″E
- Country: Poland
- Voivodeship: Świętokrzyskie
- County: Końskie
- Gmina: Stąporków
- Population: 250

Furmanów [furˈmanuf] is a village in the administrative district of Gmina Stąporków, within Końskie County, Świętokrzyskie Voivodeship, in south-central Poland. It lies approximately 7 km (4 mi) north-east of Stąporków, 14 km (9 mi) east of Końskie, and 35 km (22 mi) north of the regional capital Kielce.
