= Władysław Kołodziej =

Polish modern pagan (1897–1978)

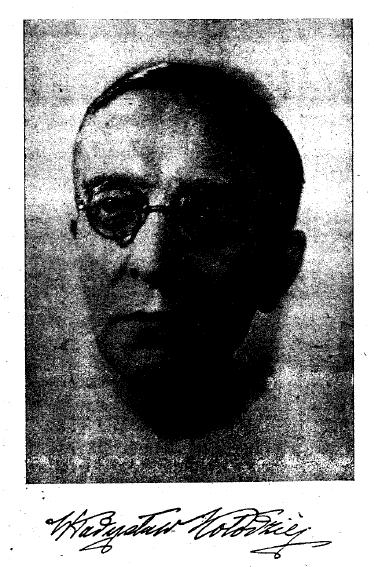
- Born: 10 August 1897; Włochów, Congress Poland
- Died: 1978 (aged 80–81)

Władysław Kołodziej (10 August 1897 – 1978) was a pioneer of modern Paganism in Poland.

== Biography ==
He was born on 10 August 1897 in Włochów and went on to study at the Vilnius University. In the 1920s he was active in a network of Polish people who corresponded and discussed Slavic neopaganism and pagan practices. He collaborated with Karol Chobot with whom he edited the literary magazine Siew wolności and the periodical Wiosna Lechicka, which focused on Slavic religion and spirituality. Kołodziej also edited Wiadomości Astrologiczno-Literackich, which presented the views of the neopagan community.

Kołodziej later claimed to have founded an active religious group in 1921, the Holy Circle of Worshippers of Światowid (Święte Koło Czcicieli Światowida), although there is no documentation of this group's activities. After the interruption of World War II, he tried to reestablish and develop his network, but Stalinism became a major obstacle. Many of his pre-war collaborators had either died during the war, become expatriates, or did not want to be public about their religious views. Kołodziej himself was arrested by the communist authorities in 1950.

The "thaw" in the mid-1950s made it somewhat easier for the Polish neopagans, although at this point there was a very limited interest in the idea of pagan revival. In the 1960s and 1970s, a small group of mostly young people gathered around Kołodziej and met actively in Warsaw. In 1970 they even attracted some positive attention from the press. The group made a first, unsuccessful attempt to officially register as an organization in 1965, under the name Lechickie Stowarzyszenie Czcicieli Światowida (The Lechite Association of Worshippers of Światowid). Kołodziej and his followers made several more attempts to be officially recognized, but were consistently rejected by the Office for Faith Affairs.

== Legacy ==
After Kołodziej's death in 1978, the leadership of the group was passed on to Jerzy "Brother Masław" Gawrych, but after only two years all activity had ceased.

Although it always had been small, Kołodziej's "circle" existed for half a century, and over this time had developed a Slavic calendar and various ritual practices. These have had a lasting impact on later practice of Slavic Native Faith in Poland.

== Bibliography ==
Pręcikowski, Leszek Sławomir (1998). ""Kalendarz Słowiański" - środowisko neopogańskich mistyków w Polsce w latach 1946-1947" (PDF). Acta Universitatis Lodziensis (61): 229–243. doi:10.18778/0208-6050.61.16.

- Simpson, Scott (2013). "Polish Rodzimowierstwo: Strategies for (Re)constructing a Movement". In Aitamurto, Kaarina; Simpson, Scott (eds.). Modern Pagan and Native Faith Movements in Central and Eastern Europe. ISBN 978-1-84465-662-2.
