= Modrzewina, Świętokrzyskie Voivodeship =

Modrzewina
- Village
- Location within Poland
- Coordinates: 51°5′37″N 20°29′26″E
- Country: Poland
- Voivodeship: Świętokrzyskie
- County: Końskie
- Gmina: Stąporków
- Population: 70

Modrzewina [mɔdʐɛˈvina] is a village in the administrative district of Gmina Stąporków, within Końskie County, Świętokrzyskie Voivodeship, in south-central Poland. It lies approximately 8 km (5 mi) south-west of Stąporków, 13 km (8 mi) south-east of Końskie, and 25 km (16 mi) north of the regional capital Kielce.
