= Czarniecka Góra =

- Village
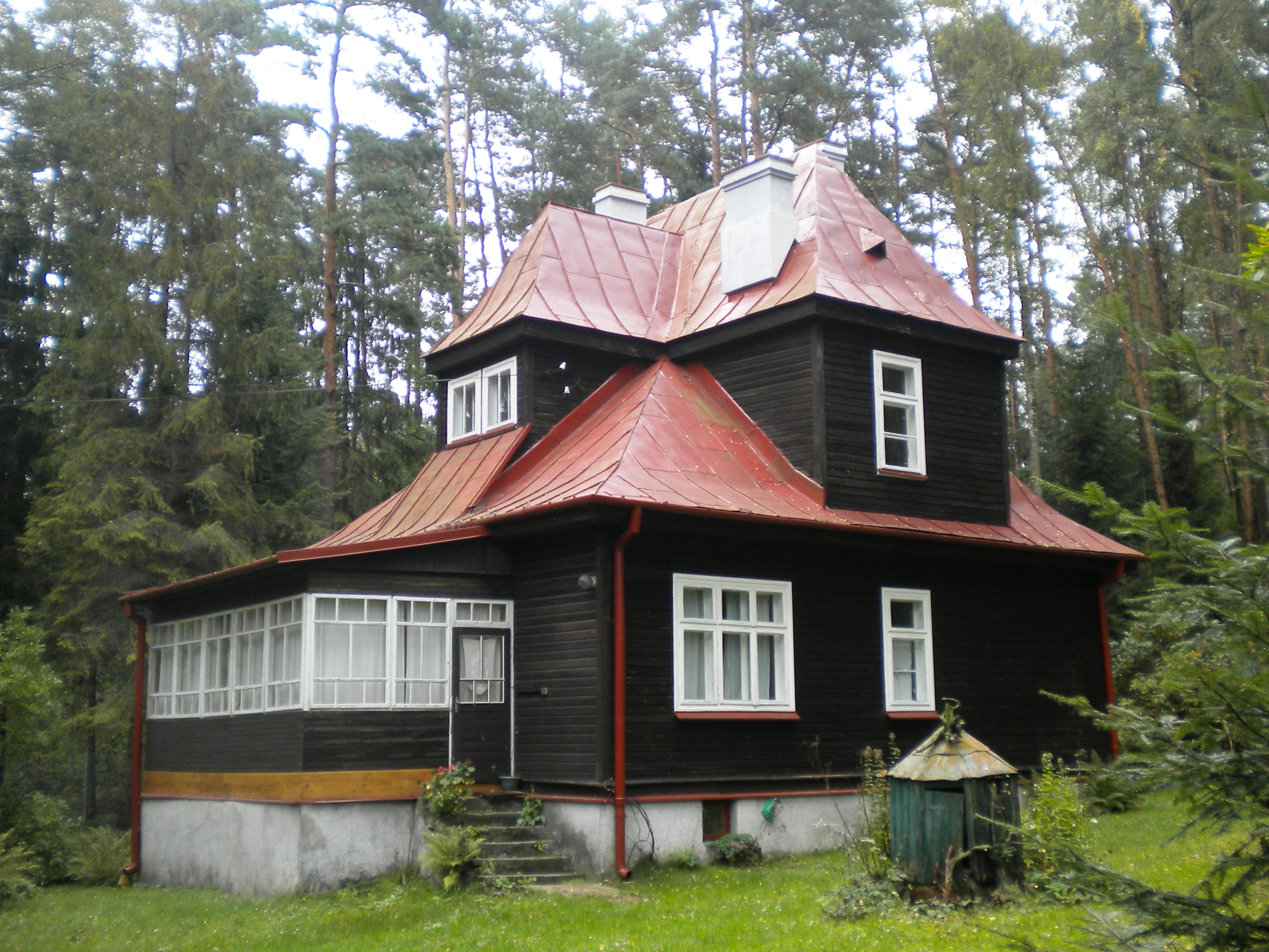

- Location within Poland
- Coordinates: 51°8′8″N 20°31′9″E
- Country: Poland
- Voivodeship: Świętokrzyskie
- County: Końskie
- Gmina: Stąporków
- Population: 530

Czarniecka Góra [t͡ʂarˈɲɛt͡ska ˈɡura] is a village in the administrative district of Gmina Stąporków, within Końskie County, Świętokrzyskie Voivodeship, in south-central Poland. It lies approximately 3 km (2 mi) south-west of Stąporków, 11 km (7 mi) south-east of Końskie, and 29 km (18 mi) north of the regional capital Kielce.
