= Adamek =

- Village
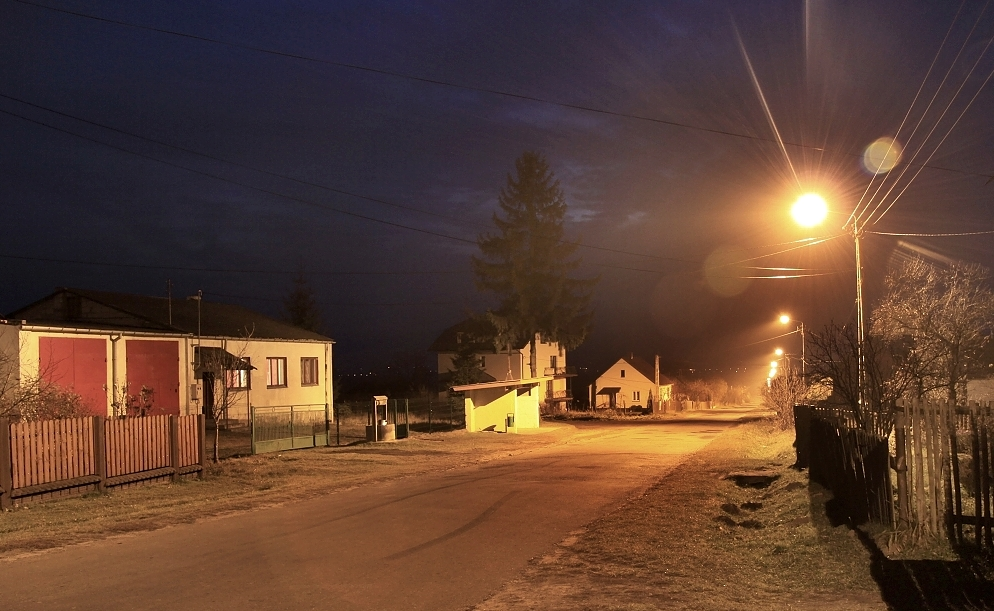

- Location within Poland
- Coordinates: 51°4′12″N 20°30′17″E
- Country: Poland
- Voivodeship: Świętokrzyskie
- County: Końskie
- Gmina: Stąporków
- Population: 250

Adamek [aˈdamɛk] is a village in the administrative district of Gmina Stąporków, within Końskie County, Świętokrzyskie Voivodeship, in south-central Poland. It lies approximately 10 km (6 mi) south of Stąporków, 16 km (10 mi) south-east of Końskie, and 23 km (14 mi) north of the regional capital Kielce.
