= Wąglów =

- Village
- Location within Poland
- Coordinates: 51°9′7″N 20°36′27″E
- Country: Poland
- Voivodeship: Świętokrzyskie
- County: Końskie
- Gmina: Stąporków
- Population: 200

Wąglów [ˈvɔŋɡluf] is a village in the administrative district of Gmina Stąporków, within Końskie County, Świętokrzyskie Voivodeship, in south-central Poland. It lies approximately 5 km (3 mi) east of Stąporków, 15 km (9 mi) east of Końskie, and 30 km (19 mi) north of the regional capital Kielce.
