= Nadziejów, Świętokrzyskie Voivodeship =

Nadziejów
- Village
- Location within Poland
- Coordinates: 51°10′2″N 20°38′6″E
- Country: Poland
- Voivodeship: Świętokrzyskie
- County: Końskie
- Gmina: Stąporków
- Population: 380

Nadziejów [naˈd͡ʑɛjuf] is a village in the administrative district of Gmina Stąporków, within Końskie County, Świętokrzyskie Voivodeship, in south-central Poland. It lies approximately 7 km (4 mi) east of Stąporków, 16 km (10 mi) east of Końskie, and 32 km (20 mi) north of the regional capital Kielce.
