= Grzybów, Końskie County =

Grzybów
- Village
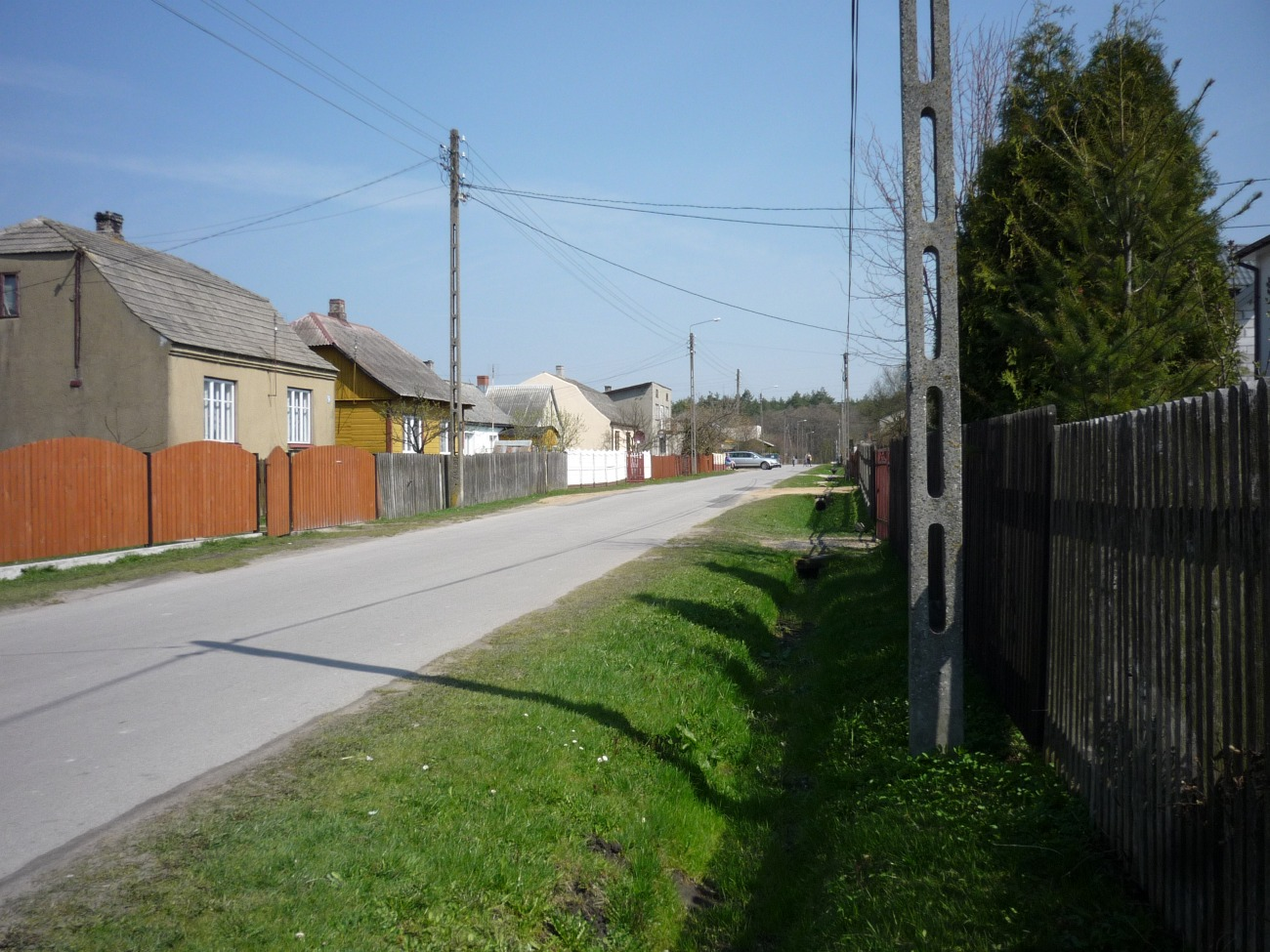

- Location within Poland
- Coordinates: 51°9′10″N 20°32′14″E
- Country: Poland
- Voivodeship: Świętokrzyskie
- County: Końskie
- Gmina: Stąporków
- Population: 330

Grzybów [ˈɡʐɨbuf] is a village in the administrative district of Gmina Stąporków, within Końskie County, Świętokrzyskie Voivodeship, in south-central Poland. It lies approximately 1 km (1 mi) west of Stąporków, 10 km (6 mi) south-east of Końskie, and 31 km (19 mi) north of the regional capital Kielce.
