= Boków =

- Village
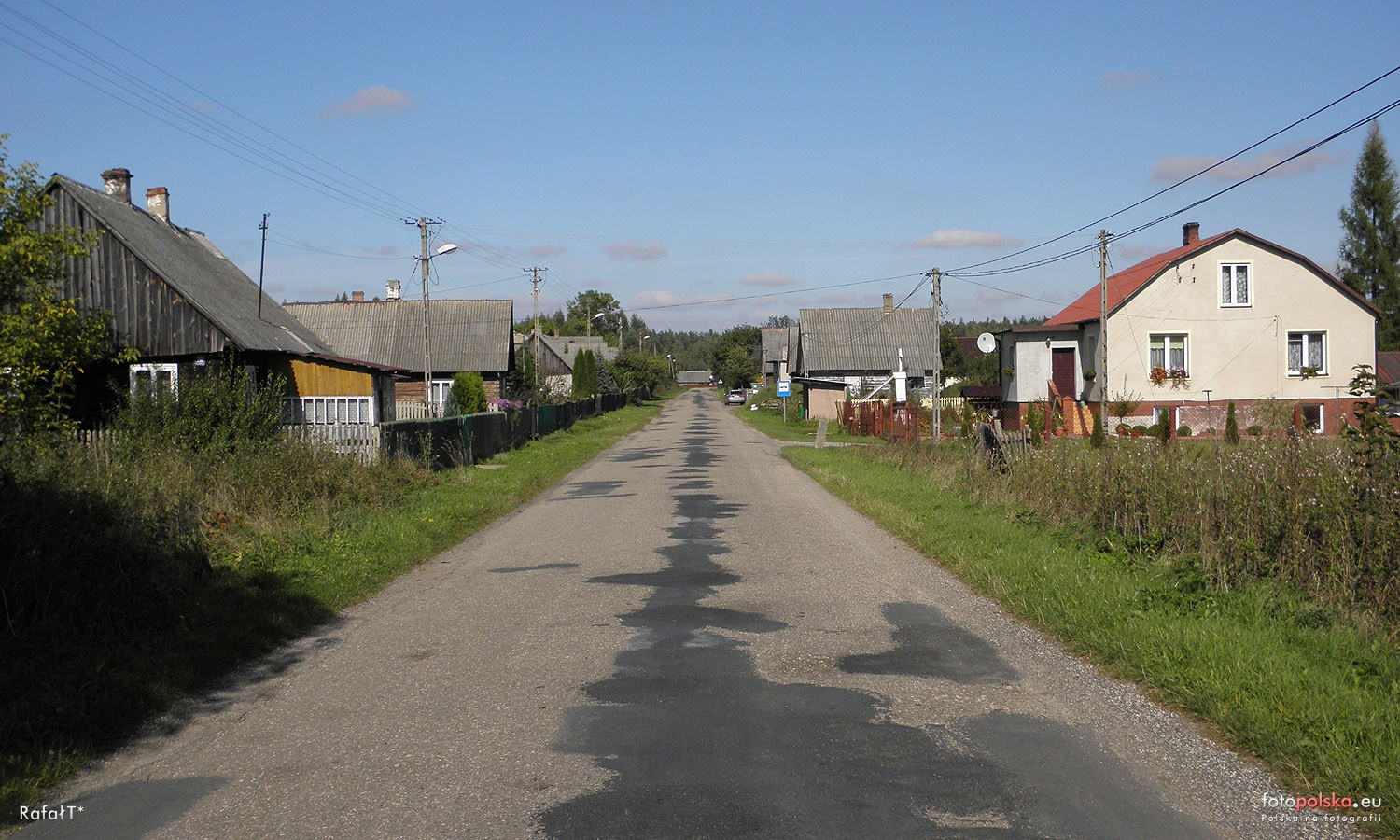

- Location within Poland
- Coordinates: 51°14′14″N 20°35′25″E
- Country: Poland
- Voivodeship: Świętokrzyskie
- County: Końskie
- Gmina: Stąporków
- Population: 160

Boków [ˈbɔkuf] is a village in the administrative district of Gmina Stąporków, within Końskie County, Świętokrzyskie Voivodeship, in south-central Poland. It lies approximately 11 km (7 mi) north of Stąporków, 13 km (8 mi) east of Końskie, and 40 km (25 mi) north of the regional capital Kielce.
