= Błotnica, Świętokrzyskie Voivodeship =

Błotnica
- Village
- Location within Poland
- Coordinates: 51°6′59″N 20°30′39″E
- Country: Poland
- Voivodeship: Świętokrzyskie
- County: Końskie
- Gmina: Stąporków
- Population: 270

Błotnica [bwɔtˈnit͡sa] is a village in the administrative district of Gmina Stąporków, within Końskie County, Świętokrzyskie Voivodeship, in south-central Poland. It lies approximately 5 km (3 mi) south-west of Stąporków, 12 km (7 mi) south-east of Końskie, and 27 km (17 mi) north of the regional capital Kielce.
