= Smarków, Świętokrzyskie Voivodeship =

Smarków
- Village
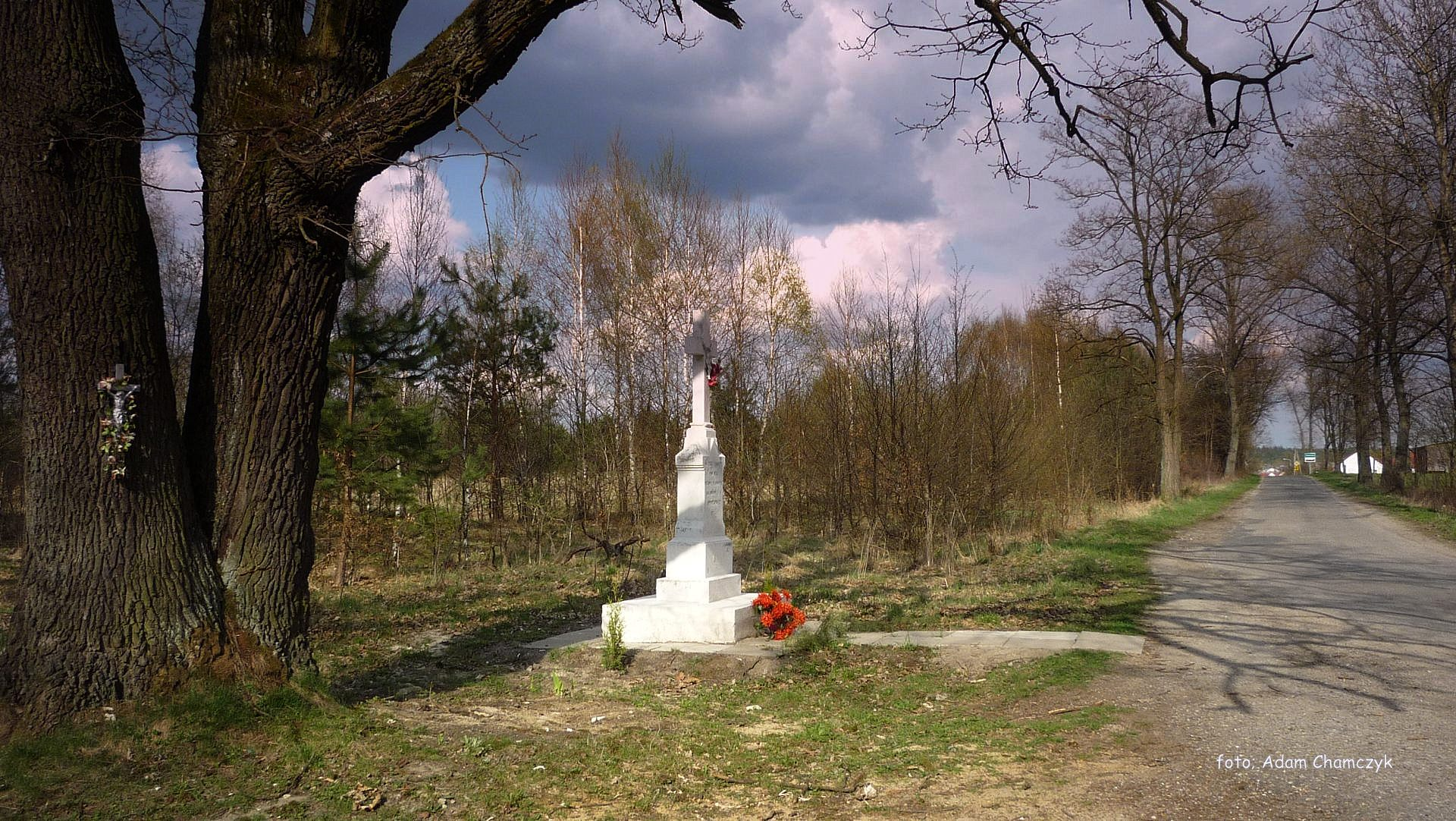
- Wayside cross in Smarków

- Location within Poland
- Coordinates: 51°11′28″N 20°32′25″E
- Country: Poland
- Voivodeship: Świętokrzyskie
- County: Końskie
- Gmina: Stąporków
- Population: 410

Smarków [ˈsmarkuf] is a village in the administrative district of Gmina Stąporków, within Końskie County, Świętokrzyskie Voivodeship, in south-central Poland. It lies approximately 5 km (3 mi) north of Stąporków, 9 km (6 mi) east of Końskie, and 35 km (22 mi) north of the regional capital Kielce.
