= Niekłań Wielki =

- Village
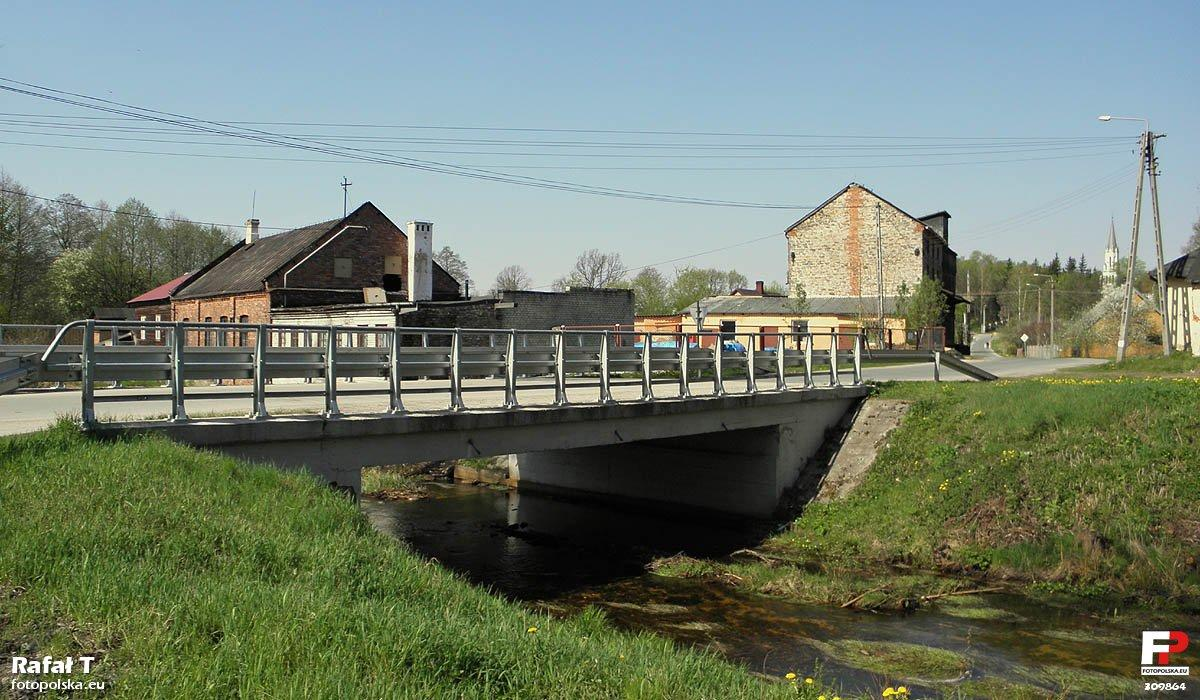

- Location within Poland
- Coordinates: 51°10′47″N 20°37′34″E
- Country: Poland
- Voivodeship: Świętokrzyskie
- County: Końskie
- Gmina: Stąporków
- Population: 880

Niekłań Wielki (Polish pronunciation: [ˈɲɛkwaj̃ ˈvjɛlkʲi]) is a village in the administrative district of Gmina Stąporków, within Końskie County, Świętokrzyskie Voivodeship, in south-central Poland. It lies approximately 7 km (4 mi) north-east of Stąporków, 15 km (9 mi) east of Końskie, and 33 km (21 mi) north of the regional capital Kielce.
