= Janów, Końskie County =

Janów
- Village
- Location within Poland
- Coordinates: 51°8′38″N 20°29′18″E
- Country: Poland
- Voivodeship: Świętokrzyskie
- County: Końskie
- Gmina: Stąporków
- Population: 140

Janów [ˈjanuf] is a village in the administrative district of Gmina Stąporków, within Końskie County, Świętokrzyskie Voivodeship, in south-central Poland. It lies approximately 5 km (3 mi) west of Stąporków, 8 km (5 mi) south-east of Końskie, and 31 km (19 mi) north of the regional capital Kielce.
