= Mokra, Świętokrzyskie Voivodeship =

Mokra
- Village
- Location within Poland
- Coordinates: 51°6′20″N 20°33′10″E
- Country: Poland
- Voivodeship: Świętokrzyskie
- County: Końskie
- Gmina: Stąporków
- Population: 550

Mokra [ˈmɔkra] is a village in the administrative district of Gmina Stąporków, within Końskie County, Świętokrzyskie Voivodeship, in south-central Poland. It lies approximately 5 km (3 mi) south of Stąporków, 15 km (9 mi) south-east of Końskie, and 26 km (16 mi) north of the regional capital Kielce.

The football team Huragan Mokra are based in the village.
