= Lelitków =

- Village
- Location within Poland
- Coordinates: 51°11′57″N 20°37′48″E
- Country: Poland
- Voivodeship: Świętokrzyskie
- County: Końskie
- Gmina: Stąporków
- Population: 190

Lelitków ([lɛˈlitkuf]) is a village in the administrative district of Gmina Stąporków, within Końskie County, Świętokrzyskie Voivodeship, in south-central Poland. It lies approximately 8 km (5 mi) north-east of Stąporków, 15 km (9 mi) east of Końskie, and 36 km (22 mi) north of the regional capital Kielce.
