= Błaszków =

- Village
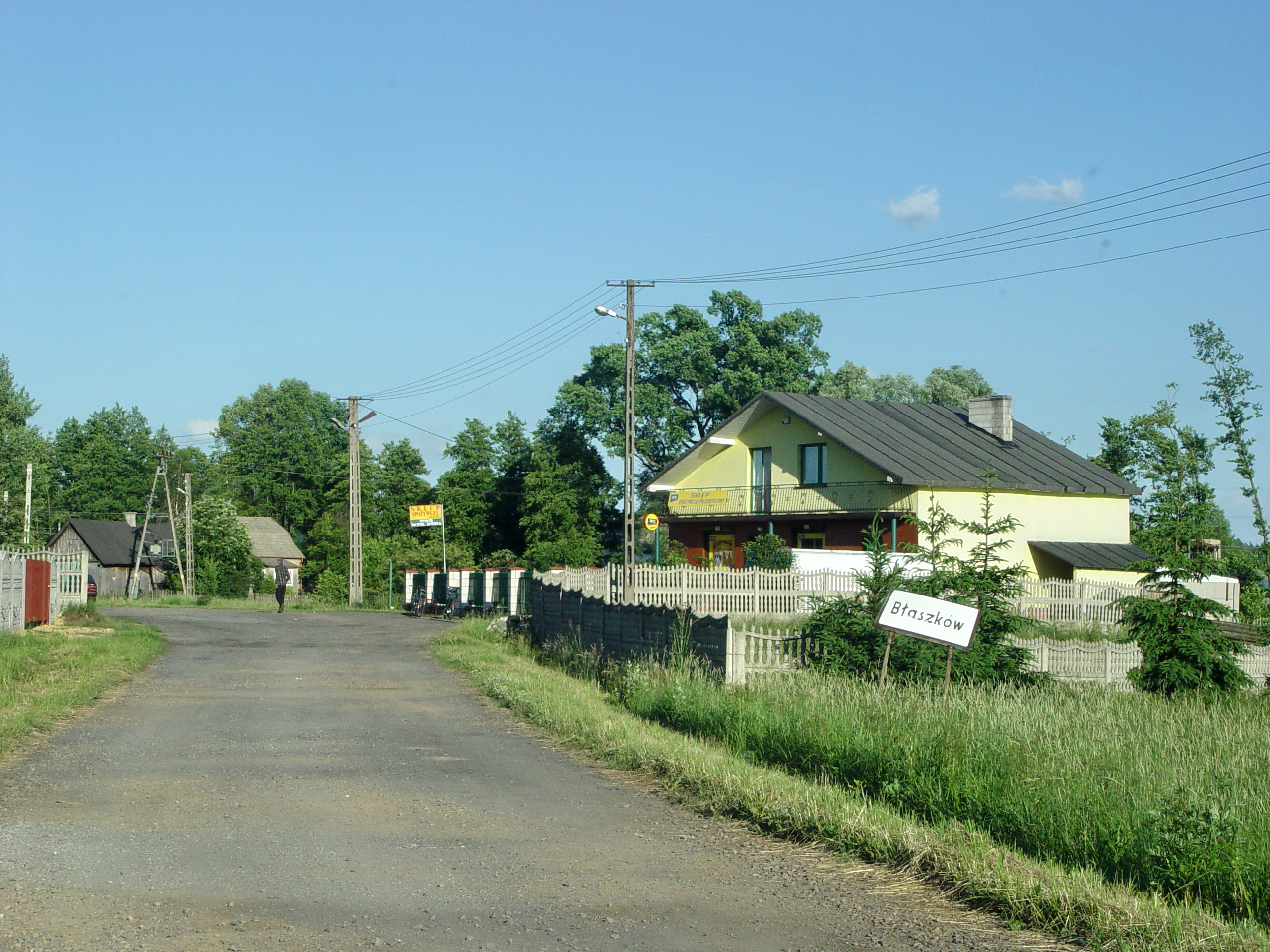

- Location within Poland
- Coordinates: 51°8′26″N 20°36′36″E
- Country: Poland
- Voivodeship: Świętokrzyskie
- County: Końskie
- Gmina: Stąporków
- Population: 400

Błaszków [ˈbwaʂkuf] is a village in the administrative district of Gmina Stąporków, within Końskie County, Świętokrzyskie Voivodeship, in south-central Poland. It lies approximately 5 km (3 mi) east of Stąporków, 16 km (10 mi) south-east of Końskie, and 29 km (18 mi) north of the regional capital Kielce.

== Notable descendants ==
The family of American attorney Joseph A. Blaszkow hails from this village. Blaszkow was the first attorney in Virginia to receive an award of punitive damages in a DUI lawsuit.
