= Gustawów, Gmina Stąporków =

Gustawów
- Village
- Location within Poland
- Coordinates: 51°4′33″N 20°33′16″E
- Country: Poland
- Voivodeship: Świętokrzyskie
- County: Końskie
- Gmina: Stąporków
- Population: 440

Gustawów [ɡusˈtavuf] is a village in the administrative district of Gmina Stąporków, within Końskie County, Świętokrzyskie Voivodeship, in south-central Poland. It lies approximately 9 km (6 mi) south of Stąporków, 17 km (11 mi) south-east of Końskie, and 22 km (14 mi) north of the regional capital Kielce.
