= Hucisko, Gmina Stąporków =

Hucisko
- Village
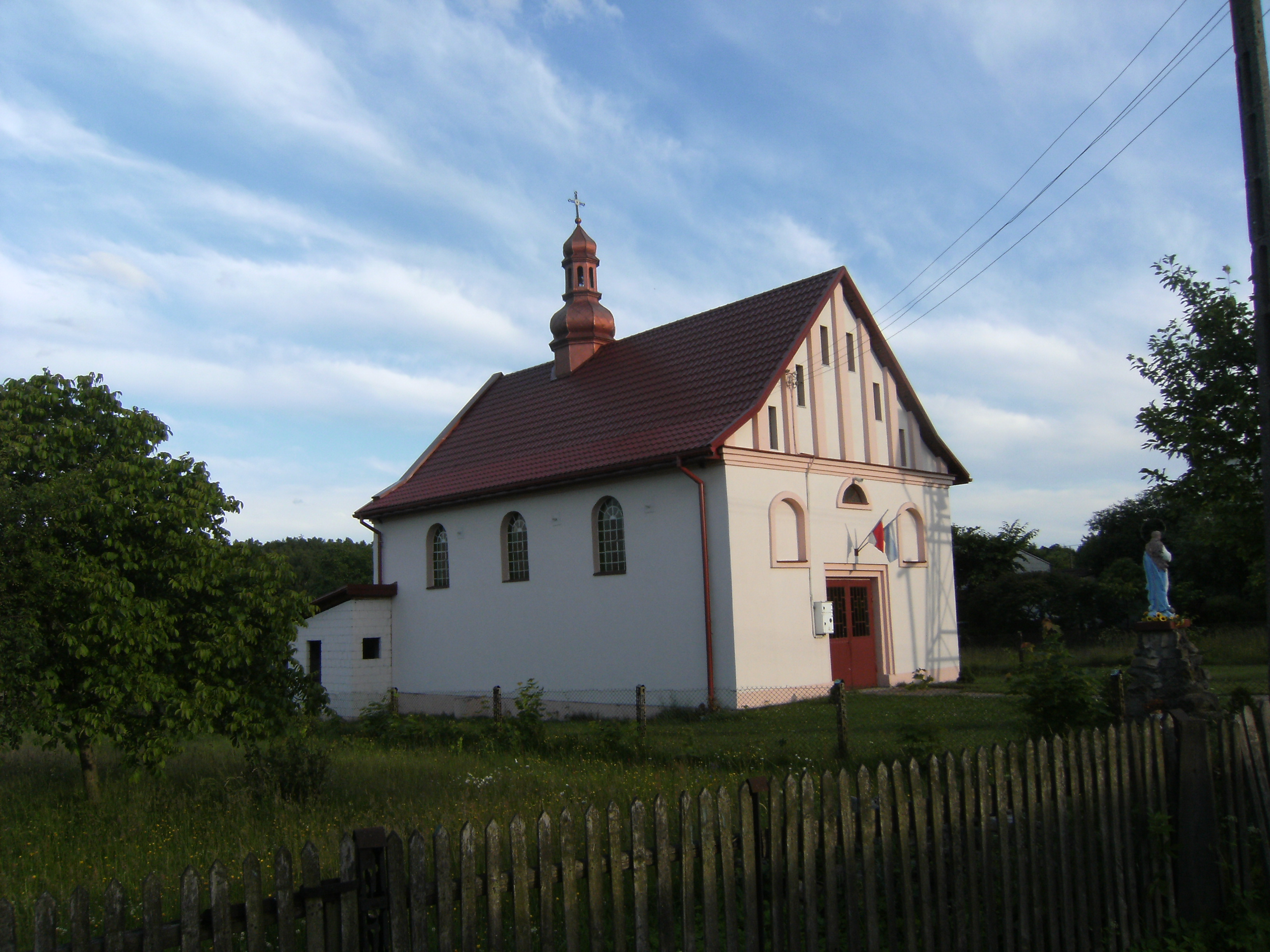
- Catholic church

- Location within Poland
- Coordinates: 51°7′15″N 20°34′48″E
- Country: Poland
- Voivodeship: Świętokrzyskie
- County: Końskie
- Gmina: Stąporków
- Population: 710

Hucisko [xuˈt͡ɕiskɔ] is a village in the administrative district of Gmina Stąporków, within Końskie County, Świętokrzyskie Voivodeship, in south-central Poland. It lies approximately 4 km (2 mi) south-east of Stąporków, 15 km (9 mi) south-east of Końskie, and 27 km (17 mi) north of the regional capital Kielce.
