= Gmina Stąporków =

Gmina Stąporków Stąporków Commune
- Gmina
- Coat of arms
- Interactive map of Gmina Stąporków
- Coordinates (Stąporków): 51°9′N 20°33′E
- Country: Poland
- Voivodeship: Świętokrzyskie
- County: Końskie
- Seat: Stąporków

Area
  - Total: 231.41 km^{2} (89.35 sq mi)

Population (2006)
  - Total: 18,313
  - Density: 79.137/km^{2} (204.96/sq mi)
  - Urban: 5,986
  - Rural: 12,327
- Website: http://www.staporkow.pl

Gmina Stąporków is an urban-rural gmina (administrative district) in Końskie County, Świętokrzyskie Voivodeship, in south-central Poland. Its seat is the town of Stąporków, which lies approximately 11 kilometres (7 mi) south-east of Końskie and 30 km (19 mi) north of the regional capital Kielce.

The gmina covers an area of 231.41 square kilometres (89.3 sq mi), and as of 2006 its total population is 18,313 (out of which the population of Stąporków amounts to 5,986, and the population of the rural part of the gmina is 12,327).

The gmina contains part of the protected area called Suchedniów-Oblęgorek Landscape Park.

== Villages ==
Apart from the town of Stąporków, Gmina Stąporków contains the villages and settlements of Adamek, Bień, Błaszków, Błotnica, Boków, Czarna, Czarniecka Góra, Duraczów, Furmanów, Gosań, Grzybów, Gustawów, Hucisko, Janów, Kamienna Wola, Komorów, Kozia Wola, Krasna, Lelitków, Luta, Modrzewina, Mokra, Nadziejów, Niekłań Mały, Niekłań Wielki, Odrowąż, Pardołów, Piasek, Smarków, Świerczów, Wąglów, Wielka Wieś, Włochów, Wólka Plebańska and Wólka Zychowa.

== Neighbouring gminas ==
Gmina Stąporków is bordered by the gminas of Bliżyn, Chlewiska, Końskie, Mniów, Przysucha, Smyków and Zagnańsk.
