= Duraczów, Końskie County =

Duraczów
- Village
- Location within Poland
- Coordinates: 51°6′9″N 20°31′41″E
- Country: Poland
- Voivodeship: Świętokrzyskie
- County: Końskie
- Gmina: Stąporków
- Population: 210

Duraczów [duˈrat͡ʂuf] is a village in the administrative district of Gmina Stąporków, within Końskie County, Świętokrzyskie Voivodeship, in south-central Poland. It lies approximately 6 km (4 mi) south of Stąporków, 14 km (9 mi) south-east of Końskie, and 26 km (16 mi) north of the regional capital Kielce.
