= Krasna, Świętokrzyskie Voivodeship =

Krasna
- Village
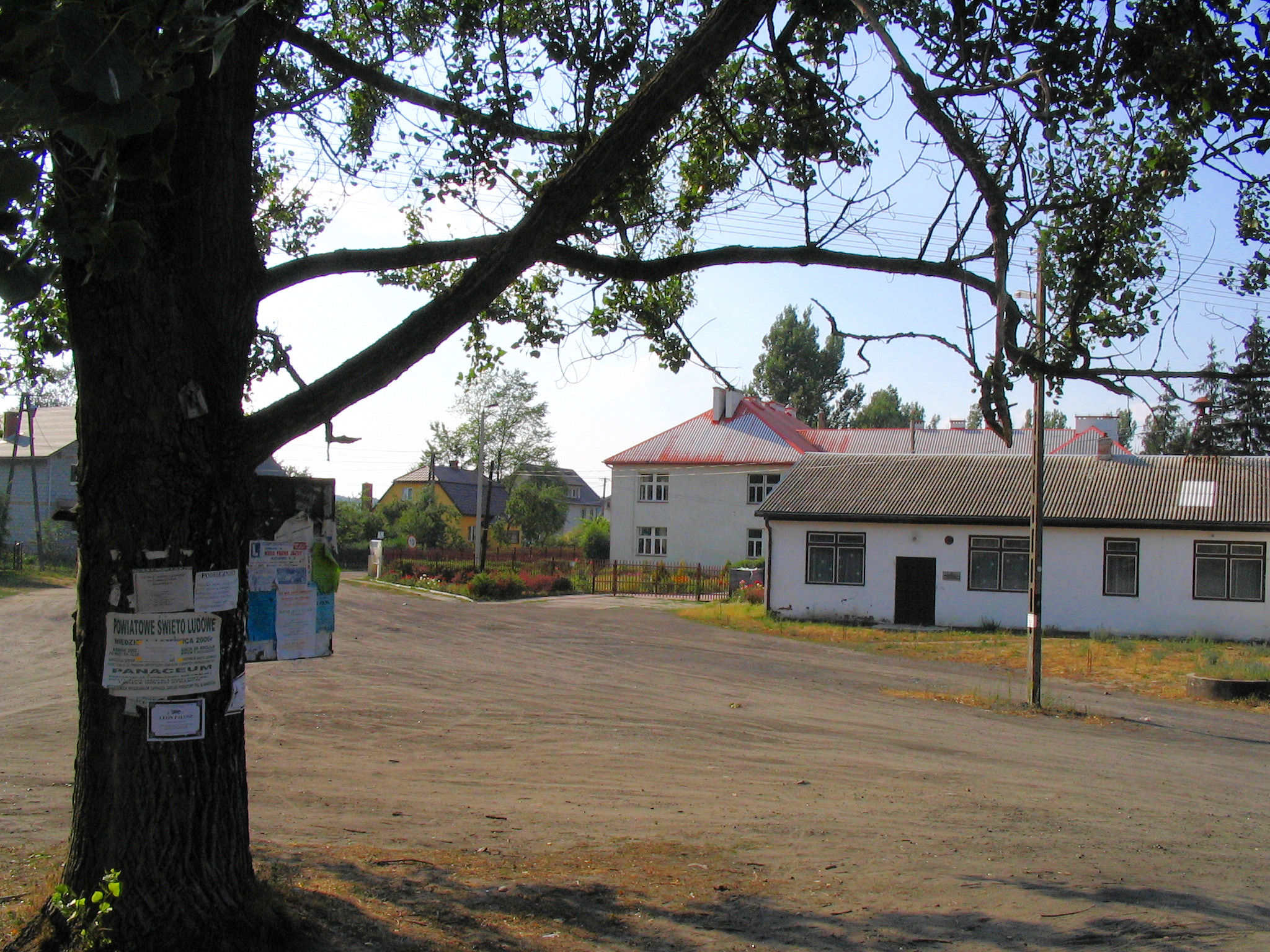

- Location within Poland
- Coordinates: 51°4′34″N 20°32′41″E
- Country: Poland
- Voivodeship: Świętokrzyskie
- County: Końskie
- Gmina: Stąporków
- Population: 200

Krasna [ˈkrasna] is a village in the administrative district of Gmina Stąporków, within Końskie County, Świętokrzyskie Voivodeship, in south-central Poland. It lies approximately 9 km (6 mi) south of Stąporków, 17 km (11 mi) south-east of Końskie, and 22 km (14 mi) north of the regional capital Kielce.
