= Piasek, Świętokrzyskie Voivodeship =

Piasek
- Village
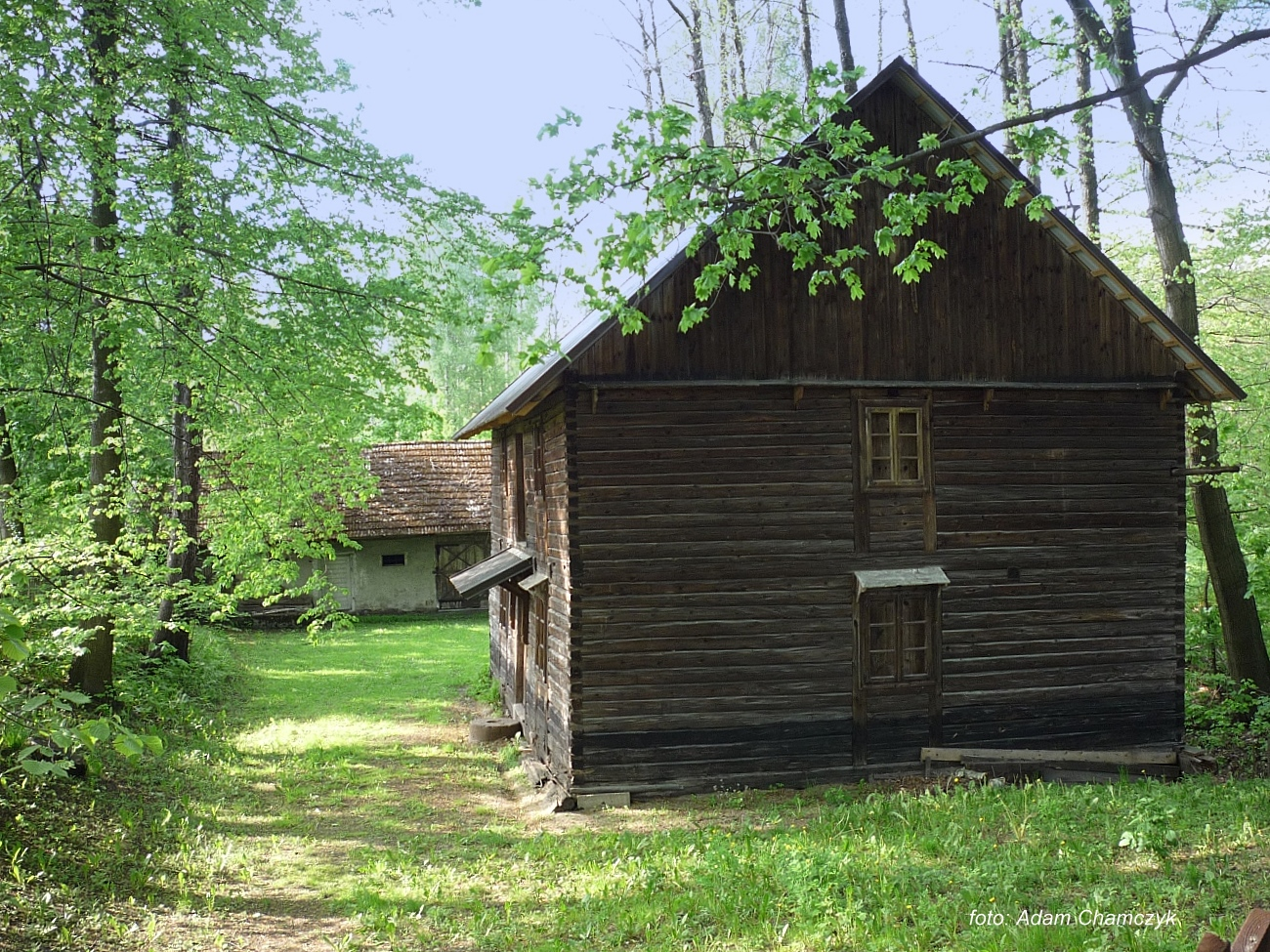

- Location within Poland
- Coordinates: 51°12′22″N 20°32′36″E
- Country: Poland
- Voivodeship: Świętokrzyskie
- County: Końskie
- Gmina: Stąporków
- Population: 100

Piasek [ˈpjasɛk] is a village in the administrative district of Gmina Stąporków, within Końskie County, Świętokrzyskie Voivodeship, in south-central Poland. It lies approximately 7 km (4 mi) north of Stąporków, 9 km (6 mi) east of Końskie, and 37 km (23 mi) north of the regional capital Kielce.
