= Bień =

- Village
- Location within Poland
- Coordinates: 51°3′11″N 20°33′56″E
- Country: Poland
- Voivodeship: Świętokrzyskie
- County: Końskie
- Gmina: Stąporków
- Population: 80

Bień [bjɛɲ] is a village in the administrative district of Gmina Stąporków, within Końskie County, Świętokrzyskie Voivodeship, in south-central Poland. It lies approximately 11 km (7 mi) south of Stąporków, 20 km (12 mi) south-east of Końskie, and 20 km (12 mi) north of the regional capital Kielce.
