= Kozia Wola, Świętokrzyskie Voivodeship =

Kozia Wola
- Village
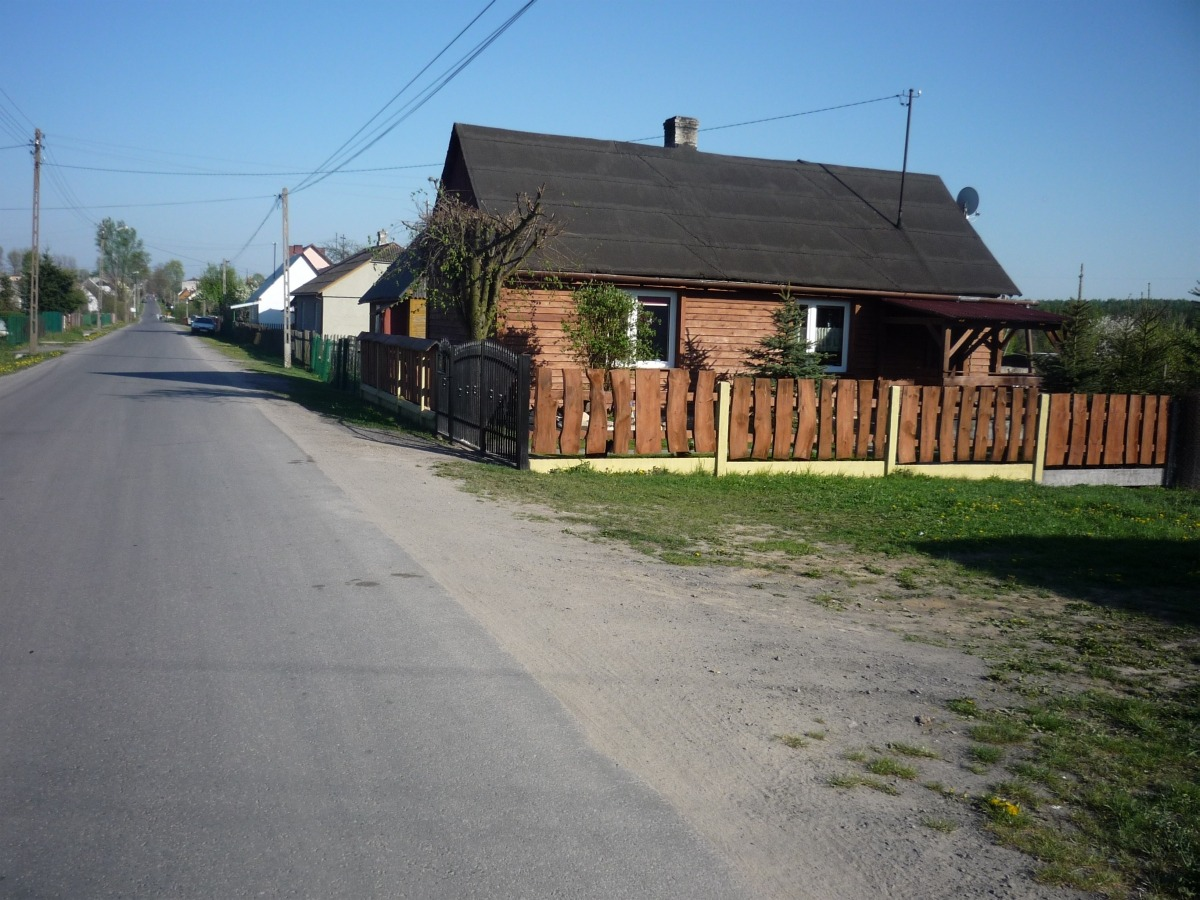

- Location within Poland
- Coordinates: 51°10′16″N 20°30′50″E
- Country: Poland
- Voivodeship: Świętokrzyskie
- County: Końskie
- Gmina: Stąporków
- Population: 730

Kozia Wola [ˈkɔʑa ˈvɔla] is a village in the administrative district of Gmina Stąporków, within Końskie County, Świętokrzyskie Voivodeship, in south-central Poland. It lies approximately 4 km (2 mi) north-west of Stąporków, 8 km (5 mi) south-east of Końskie, and 33 km (21 mi) north of the regional capital Kielce.
