= Luta, Świętokrzyskie Voivodeship =

Luta
- Village
- Location within Poland
- Coordinates: 51°3′59″N 20°34′42″E
- Country: Poland
- Voivodeship: Świętokrzyskie
- County: Końskie
- Gmina: Stąporków
- Population: 400

Luta [ˈluta] is a village in the administrative district of Gmina Stąporków, within Końskie County, Świętokrzyskie Voivodeship, in south-central Poland. It lies approximately 10 km (6 mi) south of Stąporków, 19 km (12 mi) south-east of Końskie, and 21 km (13 mi) north of the regional capital Kielce.
