= Odrowąż, Świętokrzyskie Voivodeship =

Odrowąż
- Village
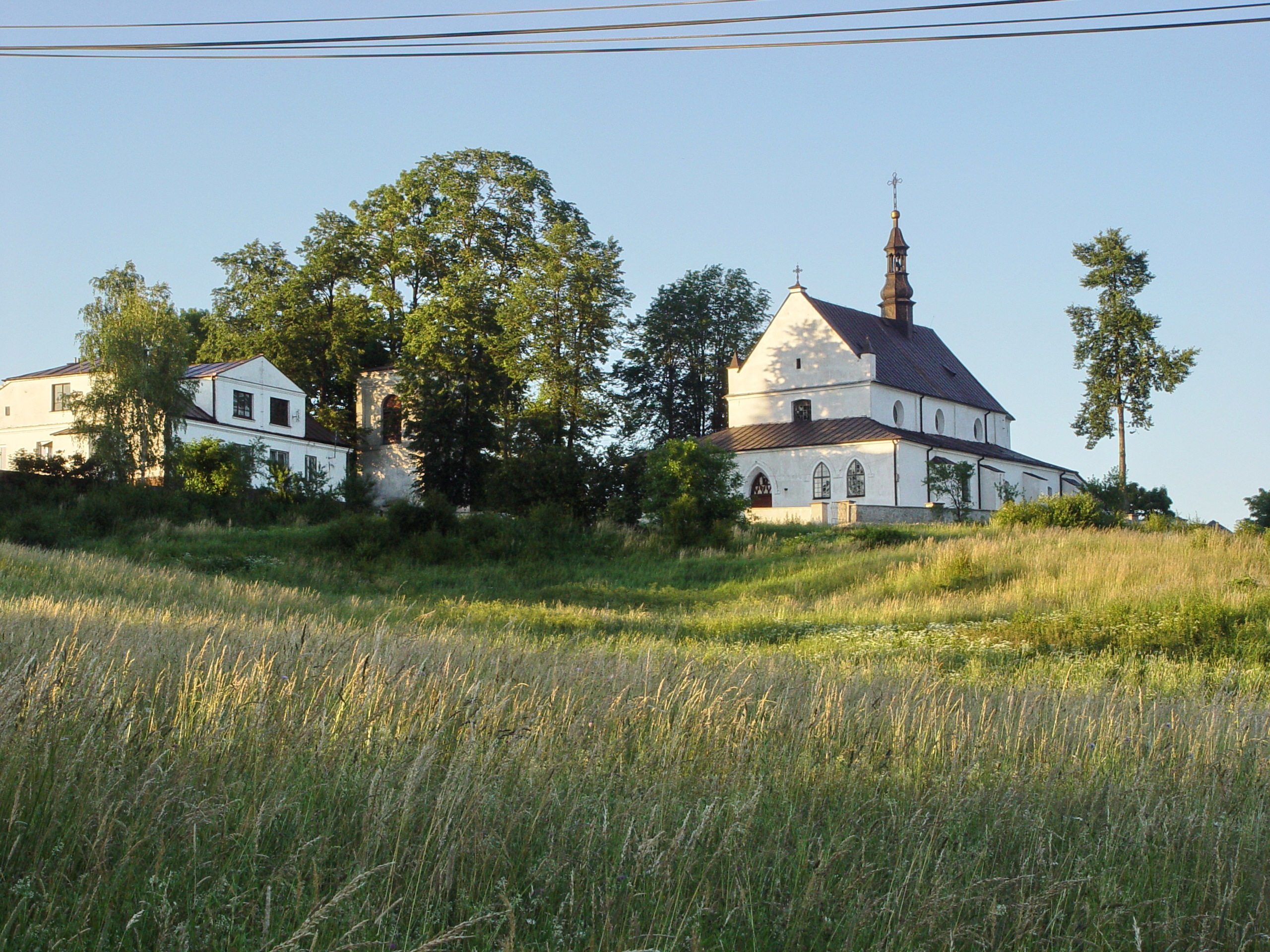
- Church of Saint Hyacinth

- Location within Poland
- Coordinates: 51°8′0″N 20°38′58″E
- Country: Poland
- Voivodeship: Świętokrzyskie
- County: Końskie
- Gmina: Stąporków

Population
  - Total: 960

Odrowąż [ɔˈdrɔvɔ̃ʂ] is a village in the administrative district of Gmina Stąporków, within Końskie County, Świętokrzyskie Voivodeship, in south-central Poland. It lies approximately 8 km (5 mi) east of Stąporków, 18 km (11 mi) south-east of Końskie, and 28 km (17 mi) north of the regional capital Kielce.
