= Emil Zuckerkandl =

Hungarian anatomist (1849–1910)

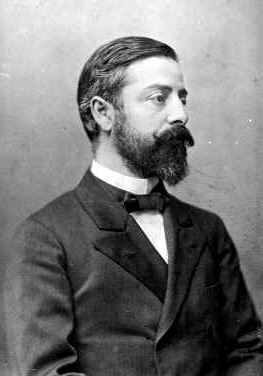
Emil Zuckerkandl (1849–1910)

Emil Zuckerkandl (1 September 1849 Győr, Hungary – 28 May 1910, Vienna, Austria-Hungary) was an Austrian-Hungarian anatomist who held the first chair for anatomy at the University of Vienna as of 1888.

== Biography ==
Zuckerkandl was born in Győr on 1 September 1849, to a Jewish family. He had two brothers: the industrialist Victor Zuckerkandl, and the urologist Otto Zuckerkandl (1861–1921). Until his 16th year, Emil wanted to become a violin virtuoso. Having not attended school, he is reported to have subsequently self-studied the entire upper level gymnasium material in a year.

He was educated at the University of Vienna (MD, 1874) and was an admiring student of Josef Hyrtl, and an anatomical assistant to Karl von Rokitansky (1804–1878) and Karl Langer (1819–1887). In 1875, he became privatdozent of anatomy at the University of Utrecht, and he was appointed assistant professor at the University of Vienna in 1879, being made professor at Graz in 1882. Beginning in 1888, he was a professor of descriptive and topographical anatomy at the University of Vienna.

He conducted research in almost all fields of morphology, making contributions to the normal and pathological anatomy of the nasal cavity, the anatomy of the facial skeleton, blood vessels, the brain, chromaffin system, et al.

He was married to the Galician-Austrian writer, journalist and critic Berta Szeps. The couple's house was a popular meeting place for the avant-garde in arts and science; their guests including sculptor Auguste Rodin (1840–1917), painter Gustav Klimt (1862–1918), architect Otto Wagner (1841–1918), writer Hermann Bahr (1863–1934), playwright Arthur Schnitzler (1862–1931), and composer Gustav Mahler (1860–1911).

Zuckerkandl was a liberal thinker who supported universal suffrage and hired with Gertrud Bien the first female university assistant in the Austrian-Hungarian Empire.

== Eponyms ==
- Zuckerkandl's bodies (1901)
- Zuckerkandl's convolution
- Zuckerkandl's dehiscence
- Zuckerkandl's fascia (1883)
- Zuckerkandl's tubercle (1902)
- Suprapleural membrane of Zuckerkandl and Sebileau

== Awards ==
- 1898: Appointment as full member of the Austrian Academy of Sciences
- 1914: Unveiling of a monument at the Anatomical Institute (28 May)
- 1924: Unveiling of a statue by Anton Hanak in the arcaded courtyard of the University of Vienna
- 1925: Designation of Zuckerkandlgasse in Vienna-Pötzleinsdorf (1925–1938 and from 1947 onward)

== Writings ==
Zuckerkandl contributed many monographs to medical journals, among them:

- "Zur Morphologie des Gesichtschädels" (Stuttgart, 1877)
- "Über eine Bisher noch Nicht Beschriebene Drüse der Regio Suprahyoidea" (Stuttgart, 1879)
- "Über das Riechcentrum" (Stuttgart, 1887)
- "Normale und Pathologische Anatomie der Nasenhöhle und Ihrer Pneumatischen Anhänge" (Vienna, 1892).
- "Atlas der topographischen Anatomie", five volumes. Vienna and Leipzig, 1900–1904. 1904 edition at the Internet Archive
- "Atlas der descriptiven anatomie des Menschen", Vienna, Leipzig, W. Braumüller, 1902. Initially published by Carl Heitzmann (1836–1896) in 1870 as Die descriptive und topographische Anatomie des Menschen.
- "Atlas und Grundriss der chirurgischen Operationslehre" fifth edition, Munich, 1915. xix + 556 pages.
