= Pardołów =

- Village
- Location within Poland
- Coordinates: 51°7′5″N 20°36′48″E
- Country: Poland
- Voivodeship: Świętokrzyskie
- County: Końskie
- Gmina: Stąporków
- Population: 360

Pardołów [parˈdɔwuf] is a village in the administrative district of Gmina Stąporków, within Końskie County, Świętokrzyskie Voivodeship, in south-central Poland. It lies approximately 6 km (4 mi) south-east of Stąporków, 17 km (11 mi) south-east of Końskie, and 27 km (17 mi) north of the regional capital Kielce.
