= Zuckerkandl's tubercle (thyroid gland) =

Details

Identifiers
- Latin: processus posterior glandulae thyreoideae

Zuckerkandl's tubercle is a pyramidal extension of the thyroid gland, present at the most posterior side of each lobe. Emil Zuckerkandl described it in 1902 as the processus posterior glandulae thyreoideae. Although the structure is named after Zuckerkandl, it was discovered first by Otto Madelung in 1867 as the posterior horn of the thyroid. The structure is important in thyroid surgery as it is closely related to the recurrent laryngeal nerve, the inferior thyroid artery, Berry's ligament and the parathyroid glands. The structure is subject to an important amount of anatomic variation, and therefore a size classification is proposed by Pelizzo et al.
