= Gertrud Bien =

- Born: 3 April 1881; Vienna, Austria-Hungary
- Died: 1940 (aged 58–59)
- Education: University of Vienna
- Occupation: Pediatrician
- Employer: University of Vienna
- Known for: One of the first female medical students in the Austrian Empire; first female medical assistant to a university professor of medicine

Gertrud Bien (1881–1940) was an Austrian pediatrician and one of the first female medical students in the Austrian Empire, in Europe and globally. She was the first female medical assistant to a university professor of medicine, working with the anatomist Emil Zuckerkandl.

== Life and career ==
Gertrud Bien was born on 3 April 1881 in Vienna to the Lemberg (Lviv) based lawyer Friedrich Bien (1844–1913) and the Leipzig native Gisela Wittner (c. 1856–1920). Bien was one of the first female students of medicine l. She graduated in 1906 with an M.D. from the University of Vienna. The famous anatomist Emil Zuckerkandl, Berta Zuckerkandl's husband, made Bien in 1906 the first female assistant doctor in all of the Austrian-Hungarian Empire and, according to Berta's memoires, "in all of Europe".

== Anschluss, emigration and death ==
By virtue of Biel's Jewish heritage and her prominent standing in the City of Vienna social-democratic public health reforms led by Dr Julius Tandler, Bien was one of those doctors that were designated enemies by the Nazi regime. Biel was politically active in women's rights questions, which is likely a contributing factor for her forced retirement, four years before Anschluss at age 52 by the Austro-fascist Dollfuß/Schschnigg governments.
