= Stąporków =

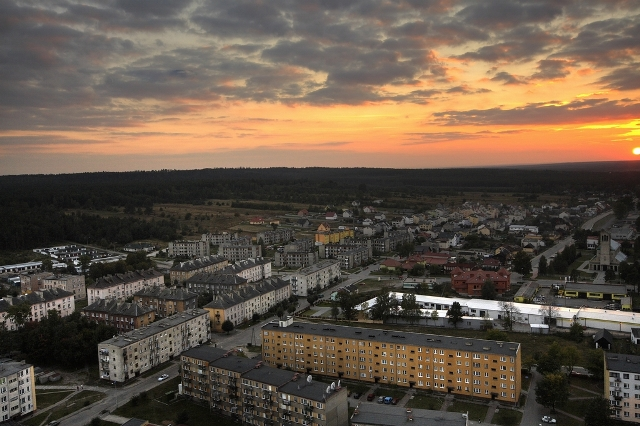

- Coat of arms

- Location within Poland
- Coordinates: 51°9′N 20°33′E
- Country: Poland
- Voivodeship: Świętokrzyskie
- County: Końskie
- Gmina: Stąporków

Area
  - Total: 11.07 km^{2} (4.27 sq mi)

Population (2012)
  - Total: 6,110
  - Density: 552/km^{2} (1,430/sq mi)
- Time zone: UTC+1 (CET)
  - Summer (DST): UTC+2 (CEST)
- Postal code: 26-220
- Area code: +48 41
- Car plates: TKN
- Website: http://www.staporkow.pl

Stąporków [stɔmˈpɔrkuf] is a town in Końskie County, Świętokrzyskie Voivodeship, in south-central Poland. It is the seat of Gmina Stąporków. It is situated on the Czarna River, in the historic region of Lesser Poland.

== History ==
The town's name is probably derived from the name of the owner, Stąpor. In the past, it also used to be called Stomporków.

The history of Stąporków dates back to the mid-16th century, and is associated with early ironworks, which was part of the Old-Polish Industrial Region. It was a private village, administratively located in the Żarnów County in the Sandomierz Voivodeship in the Lesser Poland Province of the Kingdom of Poland. In 1738–1739 a blast furnace was built here by Polish Crown Chancellor Jan Małachowski. In 1781, Count Friedrich Wilhelm von Reden, a German pioneer in mining and metallurgy, visited Stąporków. At that time, the village's furnace produced a hundredweight of pig iron per week, more than similar plants in Upper Silesia. In 1838 the Małachowski family expanded and modernized the plant. An old blast furnace was replaced by two modern ones. Between 1876 and 1895, new upgrades and expansions of the plant took place.

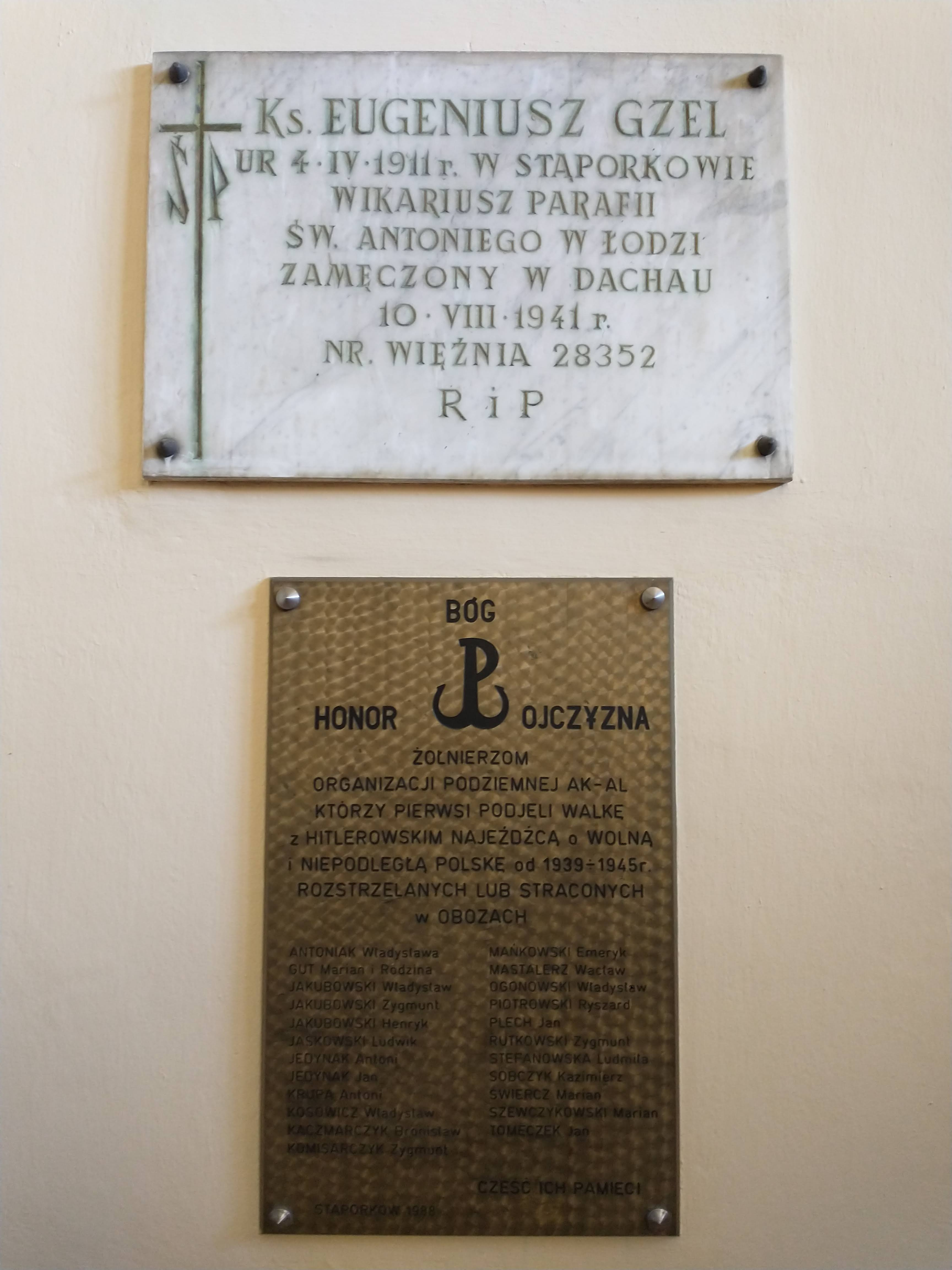
Memorial plaques to local victims of German occupation

Despite the widespread destruction and requisition of equipment during World War I, the plant operated until 1938, and the buildings survived until 1945, when they were destroyed during heavy fighting. During the German occupation (World War II), on April 4, 1940, German gendarmes committed a massacre of the family of Marian Gut, an 18-year-old soldier of the local Polish resistance. In the massacre, his parents, 12-year-old brother and 2-year-old sister were murdered and the family's house was burned down. There is a memorial at the site. The Germans operated a forced labour camp for Jews in the town.

After World War II, the local industry was reopened, and iron ore mining was initiated. The iron foundry in 1961 employed 1,100 people, and Stąporków population increased from 700 in 1946 to 3,472 in 1961. In 1967 Stąporków received municipal rights, and in the late 1960s, a Health Centre, a Gymnasium, and a sports hall were built.

== Transport ==
Stąporków lies along national road 42 which connects it to Końskie to the west and to Skarżysko-Kamienna to the east.

Stąporków has a station on the Częstochowa-Skarżysko-Kamienna railway line.
