= Drwinka =

- Location within Poland

Location
- Country: Poland

Physical characteristics
- Source
  - location: in Niepołomice, Lesser Poland Voivodeship
- Mouth
  - location: near Świniary, Lesser Poland Voivodeship
  - coordinates: 50°08′01″N 20°29′38″E
  - elevation: 177.9 m (584 ft) AMSL
- Length: 31.05 km (19.29 mi)

Basin features
- Progression: Vistula→ Baltic Sea

Drwinka is a river, the right bank tributary of the Vistula with a length of 31.05 km (19 mi).

Drwinka flows in the Wieliczka and Bochnia Counties of Lesser Poland Voivodeship from sources near Niepołomice to the mouth in Świniary, 133.5 km (83 mi) into the Vistula River. Among its tributaries are streams and ditches from Niepołomice Forest, Wilczy Forest and from near Gawłówek.

The southeastern part of its catchment basin is situated in the sandy area of the Vistula valley, filled mainly with quaternary river sediments covered with loess and sandstones of a dozen or so feet. Here the river passes through the Niepołomice Forest, dividing it into two different flora complexes.

The overall quality assessment of the Drwinka river waters at its estuary in physico-chemical, hydrobiological and bacteriological terms corresponds to Class I or Class II standards. Water in Drwinka does not show signs of eutrophication.

== See also ==
List of rivers of Poland
