= Trawniki (disambiguation) =

Trawniki is a village in Lublin Voivodeship, east Poland, the site of a World War II concentration camp.

Trawniki may also refer to the following places:

- Trawniki, Lesser Poland Voivodeship (south Poland)
- Trawniki, Świętokrzyskie Voivodeship (south-central Poland)
- Trawniki, Silesian Voivodeship (south Poland)
- Trawniki, Opole Voivodeship (south-west Poland)
- Trawniki concentration camp
- Trawniki men
