= Joseph Pyrz =

Polish sculptor, poet and philosopher

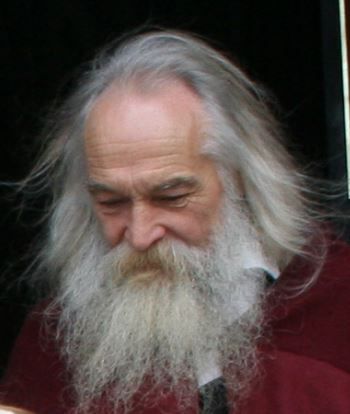
- Joseph Pyrz
- Born: February 17, 1946; Gawłówek, Poland.
- Died: September 24, 2016 (aged 70)
- Other names: Józef, Jonasz
- Occupations: Poet, Philosopher, Sculptor

Józef Pyrz, known in France as Joseph or Jonasz Pyrz, was a Polish sculptor, poet and philosopher who lived in France from 1979 until his death. Also known as the "Prophet" ("Prorok"), Joseph Pyrz was the co-founder and leader of the hippie movement in Poland in the 1960s and 1970s. He was born on 17 February 1946 in Gawłówek, Poland, and died there on 24 Sept 2016 while on a visit.

As a child in Poland, he contracted tuberculosis of the bone at age 4, which affected his gait for the rest of his life. He received medical care, and an education, first at the Children's Tuberculosis Sanatorium in Istebna and then at the Tuberculosis Sanatorium in Zakopane.

For a year he studied at the State Secondary School of Fine Arts in Zakopane, and then transferred to the State Secondary School of Fine Arts in Kielce, where he studied sculpture and graduated in 1965.

He then enrolled at the Academy of Catholic Theology in Warsaw, and received a bachelor's degree in the history of philosophy. Around this time, he became a Christian. He also developed an interest in the American hippie movement, and became the leader of a local group. Considered a role model, he wrote a manifesto for Polish hippies entitled "How to become free?" Pyrz founded the first hippie communes in the towns of Mokotów and Ożarów Mazowiecki outside Warsaw. Poland's Soviet-aligned government disapproved, and he was arrested twice, and imprisoned for several months, in 1970 and 1974.

In 1972, he married Mira Maria; they had four children. In the late 1970s, to escape persecution in Poland, he and his family emigrated to France and settled in Paris, where he worked as a sculptor. He created more than 200 works, many of which are permanently exhibited in major European cathedrals. After the fall of the Soviet Union, Pyrz returned with his wife to Poland and spent time in Gawłówek near Bochnia on the edge of the Niepołomice Forest.

Pyrz's art reflected his Catholic faith. His technique linked his artistic work with life-long spiritual and philosophical reflection. Polish singer and songwriter Marek Piekarczyk said of Pyrz: "'The Prophet' combined hippie love of boundless freedom with Christian faith. That's why he devoted himself to sacred art. When you talked to him, [you felt] great peace from him. . . .[T]his was a man who found what he was looking for."

At the opening of an exhibition in 2006, Pyrz said, "Sculpture for me is space, form and time. It is a different dimension than painting. Painting for me is poetry, it is a kind of momentary explosion of very reflective inspiration. On the contrary, sculpture, as if it were vowing to time, develops in time [and] space."

In the 1980s, Pyrz became friends with the French composter Olivier Messiaen and his wife Yvonne Loriod. Messiaen commissioned a sculpture of St. François d'Assise that was displayed at the Opéra Garnier during performances in 1983.

He also became friends with French art collectors Jacqueline and Claude Reslinger. Pyrz was living in Paris but made an annual trip back to Gawłówek and would visit the Reslingers on the way. When the Reslingers moved to Schorbach on the Palatinate border, they asked Pyrz for a sculpture to display in their garden. Pyrz eventually created more than 30 sculptures for the Reslingers, including the Ten Commandments in reddish-brown sandstone. To display Pyrz's life-sized wooden sculptures, Reslingers built a wood and glass house and a 300-meter Great Garden in Schorbach, now called the Centre d'Art.

His works are on display in cathedrals through Europe and the UK, including the Basilica of the Sacré-Cœur in Paris, Częstochowa Cathedral in Poland, and Durham Cathedral and Chester Cathedral in the United Kingdom. His sculptures include a representation of Saint Rita at the Basilica of Sacré Coeur de Montmartre, a statue of the Annunciation at the Galilee Chapel at Durham Cathedral in England, and a carving of St. Werburgh in the Lady Chapel at Chester Cathedral. In 1988, he staged a travelling exhibition in England. Eleven works are on display at the Spiritual Centre of the Pomarèd, seven in wood and four in stone.

A selection of his works and their locations include:

- Sainte Famille I, Foyer de Charité de Marthe Robin, Chatel Saint Denis, (Switzerland)
- Sainte Famille II, école Primaire Jeanne d’Arc, Castelnaudary (Aude)
- Résurrection du Christ, Monastère d’Action de Grâce, Castelnaudary
- Sainte Claire et Saint François, Monastère d’Action de Grâce, Castelnaudary
- Annonciation I, Abbaye Saint-Pierre, Champagne s/Rhône (Ardèche)
- Immaculée Conception I, Missionnaire du Sacré Cœur, Chatel Saint-Denis – Villa Vandel (Switzerland)
- Saint François d’Assise commandé par Olivier MESSIAEN pour son Opéra "Saint François d'Assise", École de Musique de Vierzon (Cher)
- Immaculée Conception II, Lycée Saint-Louis-de-Gonzague – Paris XVIe
- Ave Maria II, église Notre Dame de Vierzon (Cher)
- Passion selon Saint Jean, Caïn et Abel «Pardon», Enfance de Marie, Diocese of Angers, Angers
- Ave Maria III, Église – Centre Culturel, Lac de Maine (Angers)
- Prière pour la liberté Lirac (Angers), Église paroissiale
- Sainte-Thérèse, Église Notre Dame de la Gare, Paris XIII
- Épi de blé, Notre-Dame de la Gare, Paris XIII
- Notre Dame du Silence, École Notre Dame de la Gare, Paris XIII
- Saint Casimir et Sainte Edwige (pierre reconstituée), Façade de la maison Saint Casimir, rue du Chevaleret, Paris XIII
- Prière de Moïse, Église Saint Mérri, Paris IV
- Exode, Église Saint Martin, Barentin, (Rouen)
- Sainte Rita (en pierre), Paris Basilique du Sacré Cœur de Montmartre
- Annunciation II, Durham Cathedral (United Kingdom)
- Saint Werburgh, Chester Cathedral (United Kingdom)
- Descente de la Croix, Église Saint François de Salles, Paris XVII
- Christ de Nançay, Nançay (Cher)
- Moïse – Exode – Abbaye de la Grande Trappe, Soligny (Orne)
- Semeur, Église de châvot (Champagne)
- Moulin à bras, Italie collection Barilla
- Christ-Sermon sur la montagne, Sainte Famille IV, L’Homme Moderne, Collection Malma, Malbork (Poland)
- Archange Michel, Eglise Saint Michel, Malbork
- Les Douze Apôtres, Czestochowa Cathedral (Poland)
- Olivier MESSIAEN (en pierre), Place de l’église, Neuvy sur Barangeon
- Arbre de Vie Vierge à l’enfant, Notre Dame de l’accueil, Autel et bas relief (en pierre), Communauté de la Pomarède, Paulhenc
- Christ et Saint Jean-Baptiste (en pierre), Don de l’artiste à l’église de Mikluszowice (Poland)
- St Joseph (bois), Basilique Notre Dame du Perpétuel Secours, Paris XIe
- Annonciation IV, Les Foyers de Charité, Roche d’Or (Besançon)
- Trinité, Les Foyers de Charité, Roche d’Or (Besançon)
- St Joseph (au sommeil), l’église Notre Dame de l’Arche de l’Alliance, Paris XVe
- Buisson Ardent (en pierre), Schorbach
- Rencontre, Schorbach
- Crêche, église Collégiale d’Amboise
