= Oknoplast =

- Company type: Limited liability company KRS 000014/430
- Industry: Windows, doors, roller shutters, aluminium
- Founded: 1994
- Founder: Adam Placek
- Headquarters: Kraków / Ochmanów, Poland
- Area served: Worldwide
- Key people: Mikołaj Placek (CEO)
- Website: oknoplast.com

Oknoplast is a Polish multinational company established in 1994 in Kraków that manufactures PVC windows, window components, doors, aluminium products and roller shutters. Currently based in Ochmanów with their enterprise zone near Kraków. Facilities of Oknoplast consist of 32 000 m^{2} manufacturing area, offices, warehousing and storage facilities.

Oknoplast currently has over 1450 showrooms based in Poland, Czech Republic, Slovakia, Hungary, Switzerland, Slovenia, Austria, Germany, Italy and France. The company cooperates with German components supplier VEKA.

== History ==
- 1994 – foundation of the Oknoplast Kraków Production Company, start-up of PVC doors and windows manufacturing
- 1997 – start-up of aluminium joinery manufacturing
- 2000 – moving company from Kraków to enterprise zone in Ochmanow, Niepołomice borough
- 2005 – start-up of export selling
- 2009 – start-up of aluminium and PVC roller shutters manufacturing
- 2010 – change of name from Oknoplast Kraków Production Company to Oknoplast
- 2012 – Oknoplast signing a sponsorship deal with Internazionale Milano
- 2012 – start-up of pane manufacturing

== Awards ==
- Lider rynku 2012 – (ninefold) award for "Best Firms in Poland" in the production of PVC windows
- TOP Builder 2012 – a distinction awarded by the Builder magazine
- Forbes Diamonds 2010 – award for the most dynamic companies
- TERAZ POLSKA 2010 – promotional emblem awarded for the best products. Award given for the PLATINIUM windows

== See also ==
- Economy of Poland
- List of Polish companies
