= Kozów =

Kozów may refer to the following places in Poland:

- Kozów, Lower Silesian Voivodeship (south-west Poland)
- Kozów, Świętokrzyskie Voivodeship (south-central Poland)
- Kozów, Lubusz Voivodeship (west Poland)
