= Miedzierza =

- Village
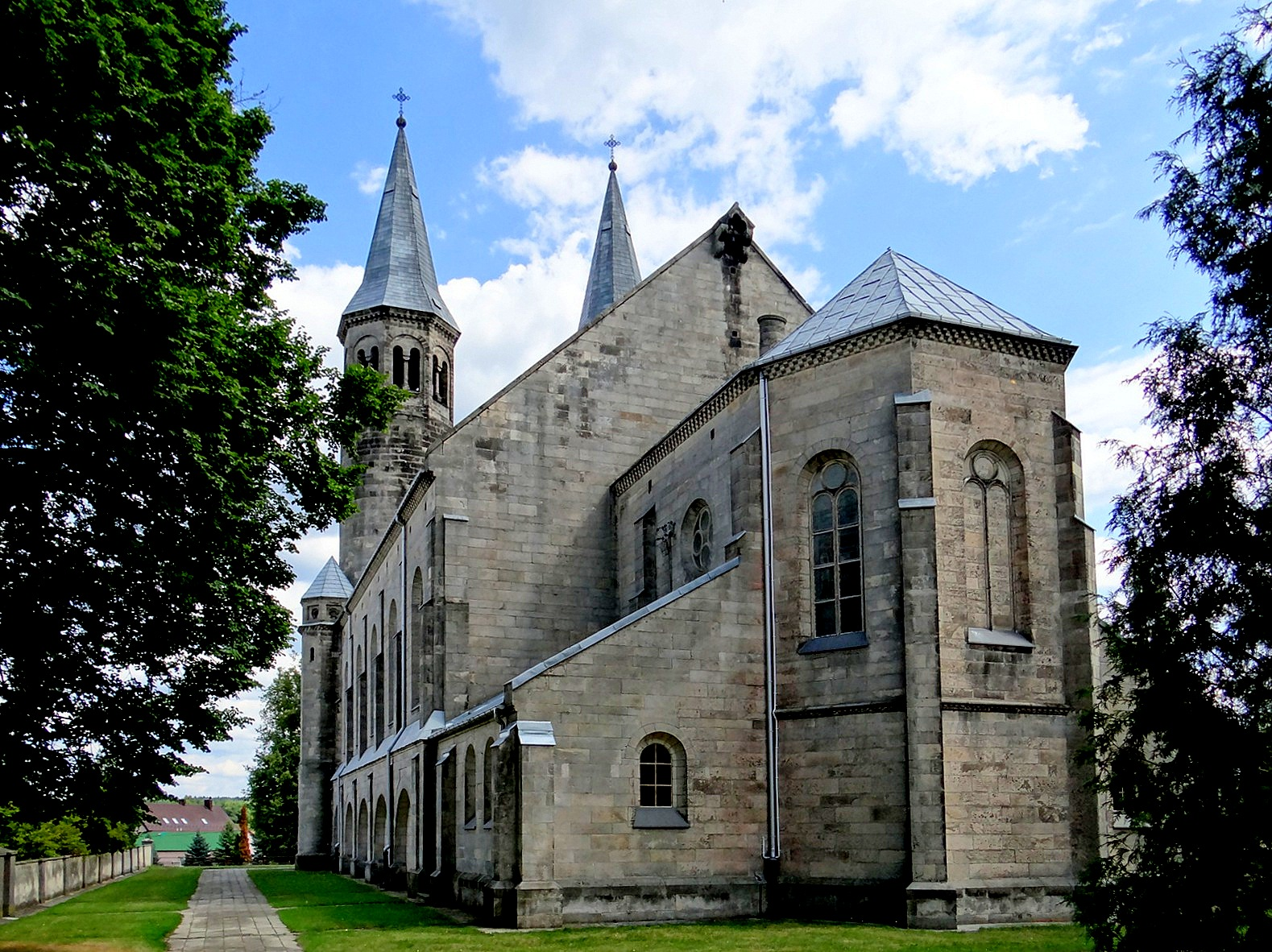
- Catholic church

- Location within Poland
- Coordinates: 51°5′7″N 20°23′17″E
- Country: Poland
- Voivodeship: Świętokrzyskie
- County: Końskie
- Gmina: Smyków
- Population: 320

Miedzierza [mjɛˈd͡ʑɛʐa] is a village in the administrative district of Gmina Smyków, within Końskie County, Świętokrzyskie Voivodeship, in south-central Poland. It lies approximately 4 km (2 mi) north of Smyków, 13 km (8 mi) south of Końskie, and 28 km (17 mi) north-west of the regional capital Kielce.
