= Niedary =

Niedary may refer to the following places in Poland:

- Niedary, Lower Silesian Voivodeship (south-west Poland)
- Niedary, Lesser Poland Voivodeship (south Poland)
