= Królewiec, Świętokrzyskie Voivodeship =

Królewiec
- Village
- Location within Poland
- Coordinates: 51°2′58″N 20°25′31″E
- Country: Poland
- Voivodeship: Świętokrzyskie
- County: Końskie
- Gmina: Smyków
- Population: 490

Królewiec (Polish pronunciation: [kruˈlɛvjɛts]) is a village in the administrative district of Gmina Smyków, within Końskie County, Świętokrzyskie Voivodeship, in south-central Poland. It lies approximately 2 km (1 mi) east of Smyków, 17 km (11 mi) south of Końskie, and 23 km (14 mi) north-west of the regional capital Kielce.
