= Świnków, Świętokrzyskie Voivodeship =

Świnków
- Village
- Location within Poland
- Coordinates: 51°4′56″N 20°24′21″E
- Country: Poland
- Voivodeship: Świętokrzyskie
- County: Końskie
- Gmina: Smyków
- Population: 100

Świnków [ˈɕfiŋkuf] is a village in the administrative district of Gmina Smyków, within Końskie County, Świętokrzyskie Voivodeship, in south-central Poland. It lies approximately 4 km (2 mi) north of Smyków, 14 km (9 mi) south of Końskie, and 27 km (17 mi) north-west of the regional capital Kielce.
