= Styczeń =

Styczeń is a Polish surname which means "January". Notable people with the surname include:

- Wawrzyniec Styczeń (1836–1908), Polish activist
- Zdzisław Styczeń (1894–1978), Polish footballer
