= Stanowiska, Końskie County =

Stanowiska
- Village
- Location within Poland
- Coordinates: 51°2′45″N 20°22′25″E
- Country: Poland
- Voivodeship: Świętokrzyskie
- County: Końskie
- Gmina: Smyków
- Population: 260

Stanowiska [stanɔˈviska] is a village in the administrative district of Gmina Smyków, within Końskie County, Świętokrzyskie Voivodeship, in south-central Poland. It lies approximately 2 km (1 mi) south-west of Smyków, 18 km (11 mi) south of Końskie, and 25 km (16 mi) north-west of the regional capital Kielce.
