= Adamów, Końskie County =

Adamów
- Village
- Location within Poland
- Coordinates: 51°3′38″N 20°25′18″E
- Country: Poland
- Voivodeship: Świętokrzyskie
- County: Końskie
- Gmina: Smyków
- Population: 210

Adamów [aˈdamuf] is a village in the administrative district of Gmina Smyków, within Końskie County, Świętokrzyskie Voivodeship, in south-central Poland. It lies approximately 2 km (1 mi) north-east of Smyków, 16 km (10 mi) south of Końskie, and 24 km (15 mi) north-west of the regional capital Kielce.
