= Wólka Smolana, Świętokrzyskie Voivodeship =

Wólka Smolana
- Village
- Location within Poland
- Coordinates: 51°5′44″N 20°23′3″E
- Country: Poland
- Voivodeship: Świętokrzyskie
- County: Końskie
- Gmina: Smyków
- Population: 80

Wólka Smolana [ˈvulka smɔˈlana] is a village in the administrative district of Gmina Smyków, within Końskie County, Świętokrzyskie Voivodeship, in south-central Poland. It lies approximately 5 km (3 mi) north of Smyków, 12 km (7 mi) south of Końskie, and 29 km (18 mi) north-west of the regional capital Kielce.

The village had a population of 101 in 2011.

Wólka Smolana is located near the Konecko-Łopuszniański protected area.

== Population ==
	2011	2021
Population	101	80
Percentage change (%)	-	-26.25%
