= Strażnica, Świętokrzyskie Voivodeship =

Strażnica
- Village
- Location within Poland
- Coordinates: 51°4′50″N 20°25′57″E
- Country: Poland
- Voivodeship: Świętokrzyskie
- County: Końskie
- Gmina: Smyków
- Population: 80

Strażnica [straʐˈnit͡sa] is a village in the administrative district of Gmina Smyków, within Końskie County, Świętokrzyskie Voivodeship, in south-central Poland. It lies approximately 4 km (2 mi) north-east of Smyków, 14 km (9 mi) south of Końskie, and 26 km (16 mi) north-west of the regional capital Kielce.
