= Bieńkowice =

Bieńkowice may refer to the following places:

- Bieńkowice, Wrocław (a district in Wrocław)
- Bieńkowice, Bochnia County in Lesser Poland Voivodeship (south Poland)
- Bieńkowice, Myślenice County in Lesser Poland Voivodeship (south Poland)
- Bieńkowice, Silesian Voivodeship (south Poland)
