= Przyłogi =

- Village
- Location within Poland
- Coordinates: 51°4′20″N 20°27′23″E
- Country: Poland
- Voivodeship: Świętokrzyskie
- County: Końskie
- Gmina: Smyków
- Population: 470

Przyłogi [pʂɨˈwɔɡi] is a village in the administrative district of Gmina Smyków, within Końskie County, Świętokrzyskie Voivodeship, in south-central Poland. It lies approximately 5 km (3 mi) north-east of Smyków, 15 km (9 mi) south of Końskie, and 24 km (15 mi) north-west of the regional capital Kielce.
