= Matyniów =

- Village
- Location within Poland
- Coordinates: 51°4′15″N 20°23′58″E
- Country: Poland
- Voivodeship: Świętokrzyskie
- County: Końskie
- Gmina: Smyków
- Population: 220

Matyniów [maˈtɨɲuf] is a village in the administrative district of Gmina Smyków, within Końskie County, Świętokrzyskie Voivodeship, in south-central Poland. It lies approximately 3 km (2 mi) north of Smyków, 15 km (9 mi) south of Końskie, and 26 km (16 mi) north-west of the regional capital Kielce.
