= Niepołomice Castle =

Coordinates: 50°47′50″N 20°27′37″E

Niepołomice Royal Castle
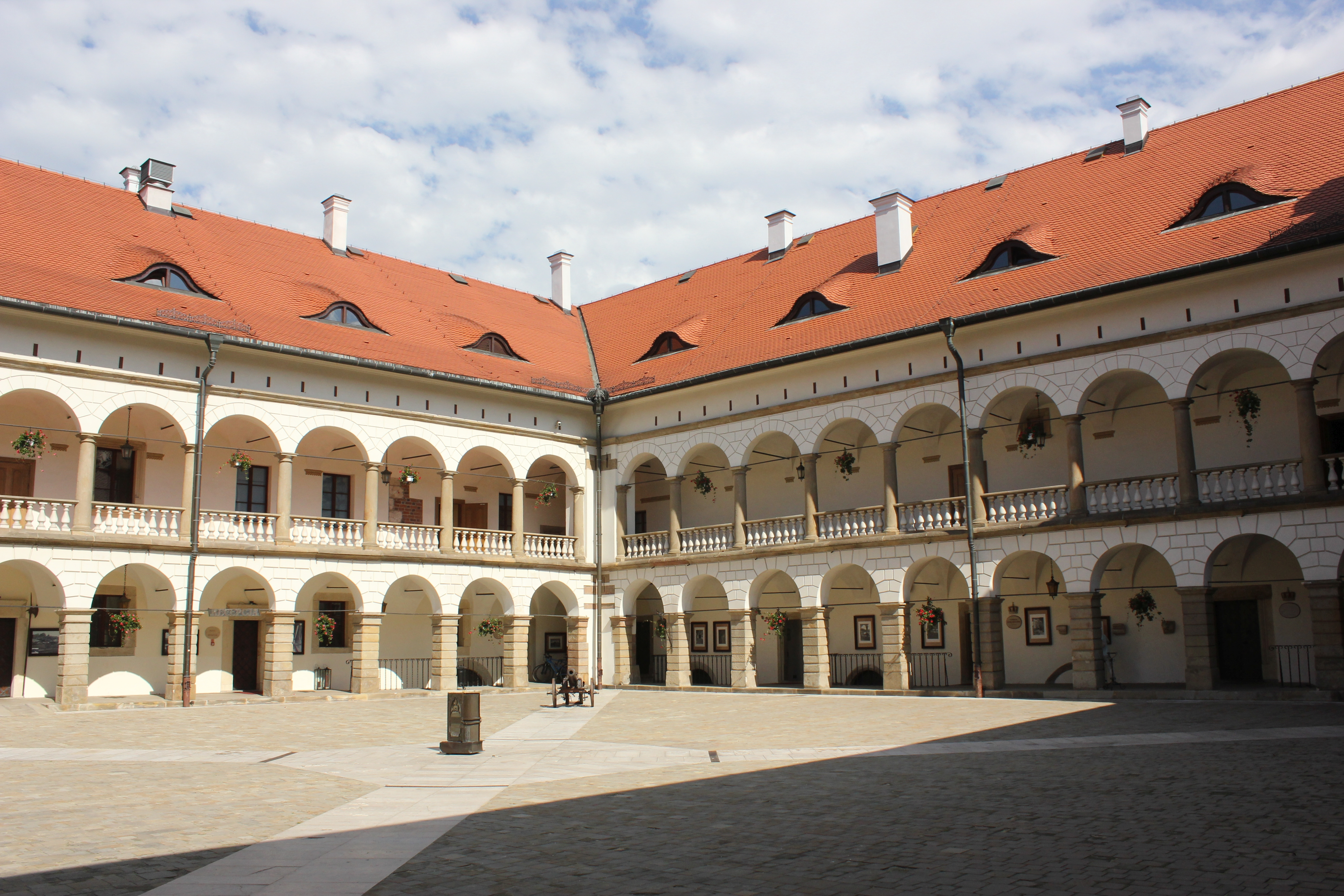
- Arcade courtyard
- Interactive map of the Niepołomice Royal Castle area

General information
- Architectural style: Polish Gothic-Polish Mannerism
- Location: Niepołomice, Poland
- Construction started: 14th century
- Renovated: 1551-1568, 1991

Niepołomice Royal Castle is a Gothic castle from the mid-14th century, rebuilt in the late Renaissance style and called the second Wawel. It is situated in Niepołomice, Poland and was extensively reconstructed in the 1990s.

Niepołomice Castle was built by order of King Casimir III the Great on the slope of the Vistula valley, to serve as a retreat during hunting expeditions to the nearby Niepołomice Forest. The castle consisted of three towers, buildings in the southern and eastern wing, and curtain walls surrounding a courtyard. Sigismund I the Old rebuilt the structure, giving it the form of a quadrangle with an internal courtyard. Queen Bona Sforza's gardens were located on the southern flank. Bona Sforca was pregnant and expected to give birth to a legitimate brother of Sigismund II Augustus, however in 1527, being pregnant for five-months, she fall from a horse during hunting of a bear and gave a preterm birth to her second son who was born alive and baptized as Albert, but died a few hours after his birth and was buried in the castle's chapel.

In 1550 a great fire destroyed the east and north wings. Reconstruction works were conducted in 1551-1568 under the supervision of Tomasz Grzymała and a sculptor Santi Gucci. At the end of the 16th century the castle passed into the hands of the Curylo, Branicki and Lubomirski families. At that time, only small changes were made to the castle interiors (fireplaces, ceilings). Construction of an arcade courtyard began in 1635 and was completed in 1637.

The Swedish-Brandenburgian invasion in 1655 brought an end to the magnificence of the building. The castle was transformed into a food store during the occupation. In the 18th century it was acquired by King Augustus II the Strong and Augustus III. The reconstruction of the former royal residence began in 1991, when it became the property of Niepołomice Municipality.

== See also ==
- List of mannerist structures in Southern Poland
- Castles in Poland
- John Dee 1583 Castle meetup with King Stephen Báthory
- Jagiellonian tapestries also known as the Wawel arrasses
