= Salata =

Salata may refer to:

== Places ==
- Šalata, a neighborhood of Zagreb, Croatia
- Salata, Poland, a village in Poland

== People ==
- Achille Salata, Italian sculptor
- Andy Salata (1900–83), American football player
- Dario Salata (1913–1990), Italian sailor
- Francesco Salata (1876–1944), Dalmatian Italian politician
- Greg Salata (born 1949), American actor
- Jean Salata (born 1965), Chilean businessman based in Hong Kong
- Kornel Saláta (born 1985), Slovak footballer
- Paul Salata (1926–2021), American football player
- Tomáš Šalata (born 1997), Slovak footballer
- Sandra Sałata, Polish footballer
- Sheri Salata (born 1959), American author, speaker and producer

== Other ==
- Salată de boeuf, Romanian dish
- Salata baladi, Egyptian dish
- Salata Rule, NFL Draft rule named for Paul Salata
- Salata Salad Kitchen, American restaurant chain
