= Cisownik, Świętokrzyskie Voivodeship =

Cisownik
- Village
- Location within Poland
- Coordinates: 51°5′26″N 20°26′10″E
- Country: Poland
- Voivodeship: Świętokrzyskie
- County: Końskie
- Gmina: Smyków
- Population (approx.): 70

Cisownik [t͡ɕiˈsɔvnik] is a village in the administrative district of Gmina Smyków, within Końskie County, Świętokrzyskie Voivodeship, in south-central Poland. It lies approximately 5 km (3 mi) north-east of Smyków, 13 km (8 mi) south of Końskie, and 27 km (17 mi) north-west of the regional capital Kielce.
