= Drwinia =

- Village
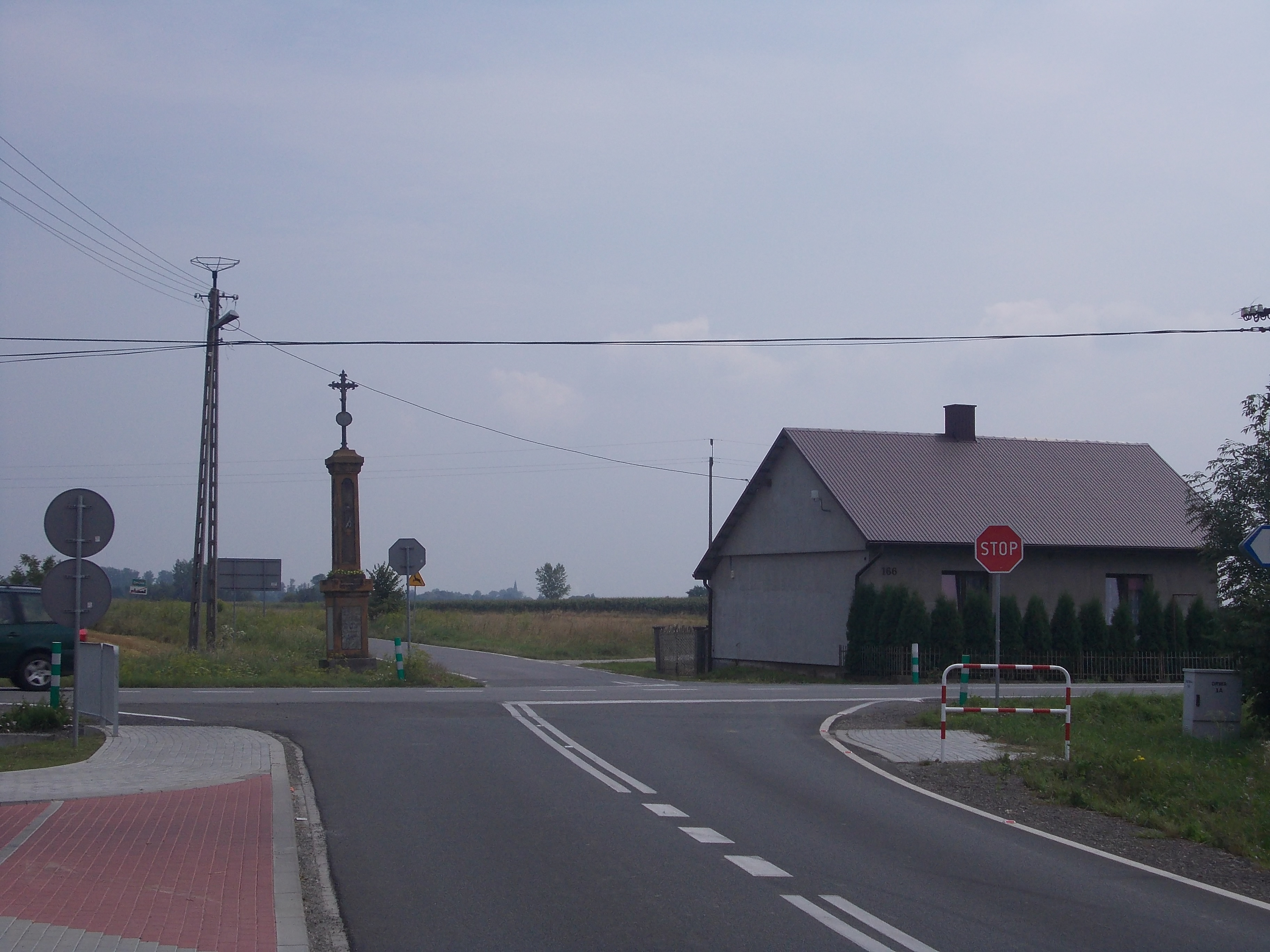

- Location within Poland
- Coordinates: 50°6′N 20°27′E
- Country: Poland
- Voivodeship: Lesser Poland
- County: Bochnia
- Gmina: Drwinia

Drwinia [ˈdrviɲa] is a village in Bochnia County, Lesser Poland Voivodeship, in southern Poland. It is the seat of the gmina (administrative district) called Gmina Drwinia.
