= Wawrzyniec Styczeń =

Polish social activist

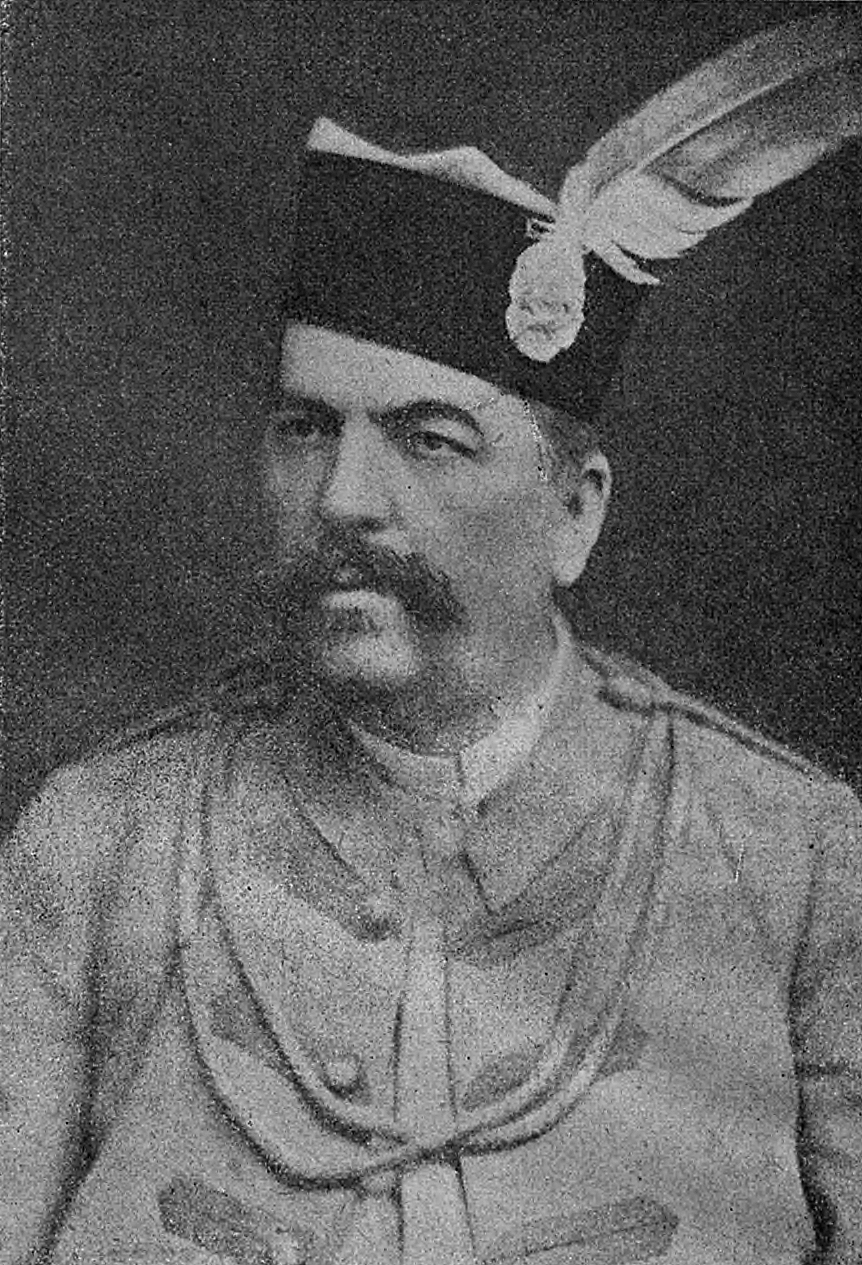
- Born: January 5, 1836; Wola Drwińska, Kingdom of Galicia and Lodomeria
- Died: May 29, 1908 (aged 72); Niepolomitz, Kingdom of Galicia and Lodomeria
- Resting place: Rakowicki Cemetery
- Education: Jagiellonian University
- Occupation: Lawyer

Wawrzyniec Styczeń ([vaˈvʐɨɲɛt͡s ˈstɨt͡ʂɛɲ]; January 5, 1836 in Wola Drwińska near Bochnia – May 29, 1908 in Niepołomice) was a Polish social activist, lawyer, president of the Kraków branch of the Polish Sokół movement, member of the Society of Appreciation of the History and Monuments of Kraków, and member of the Kraków City Council.

== Biography ==
Styczeń came from a peasant family. He most likely began his studies in his native Wola Drwińska, and by 1854 attended the Saint Anne's gymnasium in Kraków. He graduated after five years. Between 1859 and 1863 he studied at the Faculty of Law of the Jagiellonian University. He finished his doctorate in Law in 1869.

Styczeń settled permanently in Kraków and purchased a house on Karmelicka street. He operated a successful law practice, and gradually acquired the reputation as "the most outstanding personality of the Kraków Bar". For many years he served as President of the Board of the Kraków Bar, and was also a member of the disciplinary committee of the Bar (within the Kraków National Court).

He was active in social work. After the establishment of the Kraków branch of the Sokól athletic society in Kraków in 1885, he became one of its members and served as the president of the organization after the resignation of Michał Bałucki, in 1886. He also served as the vice-president of the Lwów chapter of the organization. Styczeń was instrumental in obtaining funds for and organizing the construction of the Sokól headquarters in Kraków, which opened up in November 1889 on Wolska Street. The building was expanded in 1894.

Under his leadership the athletic organization expanded to include, in addition to gymnastics, fencing, rowing, horse riding and cycling. Styczeń closely cooperated with the original Czech Sokol establishment. In 1894 the Kraków members participated in a national athletic exhibition in Lwów, and in June 1896 Styczeń helped to organize a three-day tournament and rally of the club with representatives from Galicia, Greater Poland, Czech lands and the United States. In 1894 the Kraków branch had 1,200 members, including doctors, land owners, merchants and artists. Due to disputes with other members of the organization, Styczeń stepped down as president in 1898 and was replaced by Władysław Turski.

In June 1887, Styczeń began to serve on the Kraków City Council, and remained in the position for the next fifteen years. He served in the economic and legal departments and from 1891 he headed the commission to "attract foreign visitors to the city of Kraków and its surroundings". He was deeply concerned with improving the aesthetics of the city and in November 1896 he was invited by Stanisław Krzyżanowski to join the Society of Appreciation of the History and Monuments of Kraków.

Between 1887 and 1890 he was a member of the Faculty of the Great Savings Fund for the City of Kraków under the presidency of Feliks Szlachtowski. He continued to work in the same capacity under the next president, Józef Friedlein.

He was involved in charitable work, as a member of the Arcybractwa Miłosierdzia i Banku Pobożnego (the "Arch-brothers of Mercy and of the Pious Bank"). He served as their legal advisor, as well as for the Goodwill Society.

At the end of 1904 he left Kraków and moved his offices to Niepołomice, where he served as a city councilor and on the district court. He died in Niepołomice on May 29, 1908. He was buried at the Rakowicki Cemetery in the family tomb of the Ziembiński, his wife's family. His tomb has an erroneous date of birth, given as 1837 instead of 1836.

He married Helena Ziembińska (born in 1850 in Kraków) in 1870 and had four children: daughter Mary (born 1873), and sons, Stanisław (born 1876), Alexander (born 1878) and Adam (born 1889).

== Sources ==
- Celina Koczarska-Bak, "Jan Lawrence (1836-1908)", in: People who Loved Kraków: the founders of the Society of Lovers of History and Monuments of Cracow (edited by Wieslaw Bieńkowskiego), Kraków: Society for Lovers of History and Monuments of Cracow, 1997
- Stanislaw Zieba, "Jan Lawrence", in: Biographical Dictionary of Polish Lawyers, Volume I (edited by Romana Łyczywka), Warsaw: Wydawnictwo Prawnicze, 1983 (the date of birth: 1835)
