= Zakrzów, Wieliczka County =

Zakrzów
- Village
- Location within Poland
- Coordinates: 50°0′20″N 20°8′39″E
- Country: Poland
- Voivodeship: Lesser Poland
- County: Wieliczka
- Gmina: Niepołomice
- Website: http://www.zakrzow.net

Zakrzów [ˈzakʂuf] is a village in the administrative district of Gmina Niepołomice, within Wieliczka County, Lesser Poland Voivodeship, in southern Poland.
