= Chobot, Lesser Poland Voivodeship =

Chobot
- Village
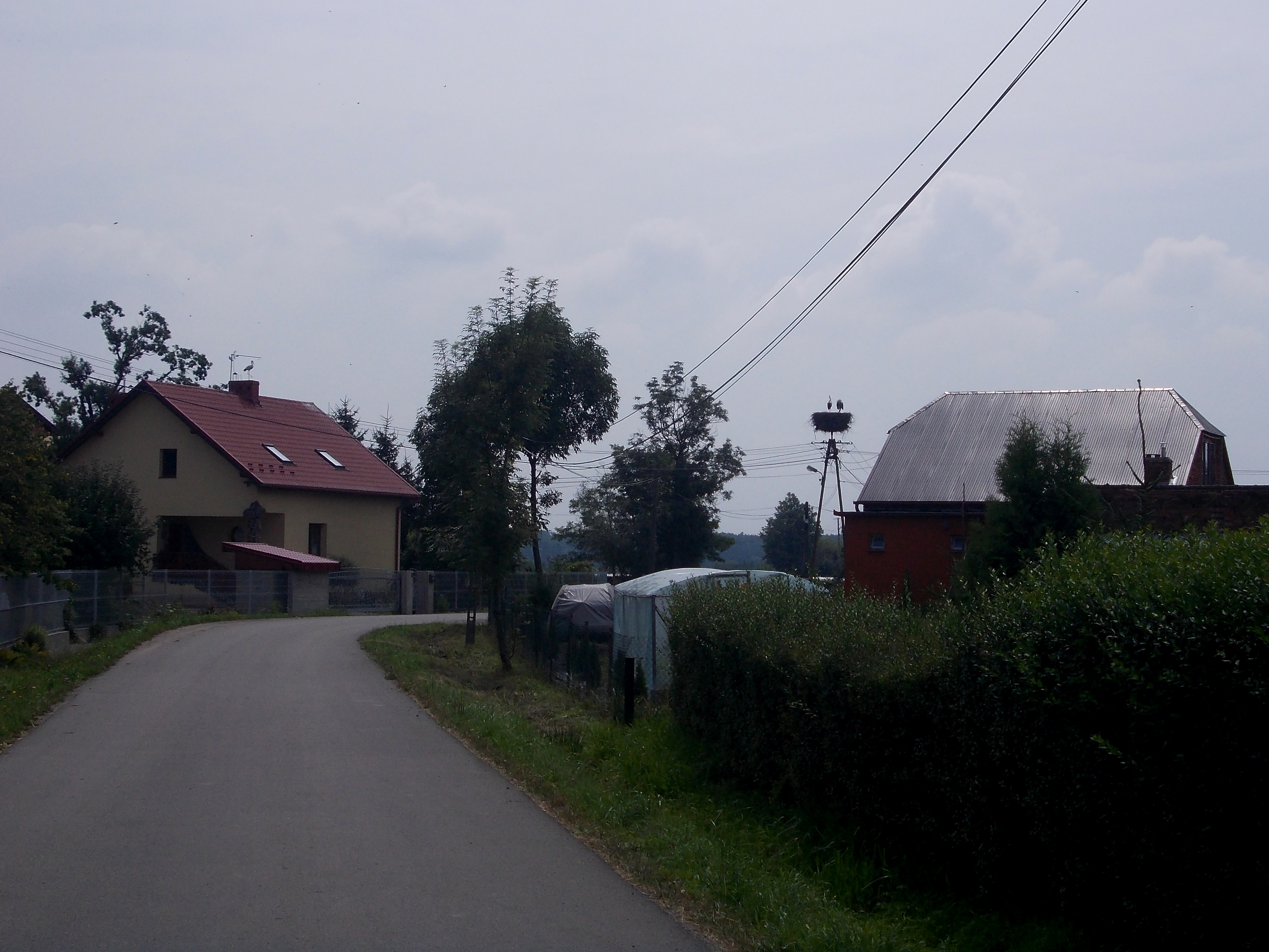

- Location within Poland
- Coordinates: 50°4′47″N 20°21′10″E
- Country: Poland
- Voivodeship: Lesser Poland
- County: Wieliczka
- Gmina: Niepołomice

Chobot [ˈxɔbɔt] is a village in the administrative district of Gmina Niepołomice, within Wieliczka County, Lesser Poland Voivodeship, in southern Poland.
