= Wola Zabierzowska =

- Village
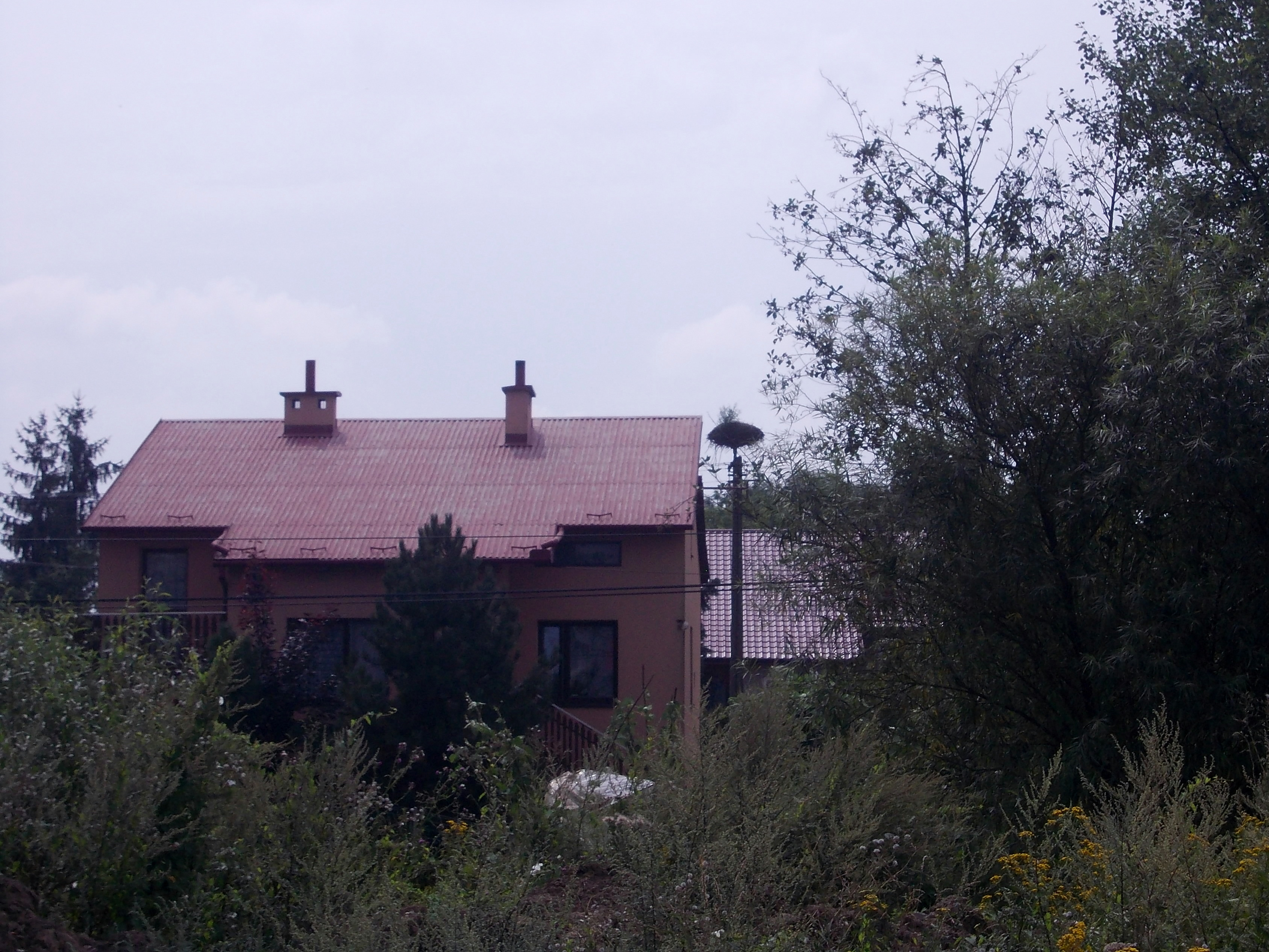

- Location within Poland
- Coordinates: 50°4′N 20°21′E
- Country: Poland
- Voivodeship: Lesser Poland
- County: Wieliczka
- Gmina: Niepołomice

Wola Zabierzowska [ˈvɔla zabjɛˈʐɔfska] is a village in the administrative district of Gmina Niepołomice, within Wieliczka County, Lesser Poland Voivodeship, in southern Poland.
