= Salata, Poland =

Salata
- Village
- Location within Poland
- Coordinates: 51°2′3″N 20°25′13″E
- Country: Poland
- Voivodeship: Świętokrzyskie
- County: Końskie
- Gmina: Smyków
- Population: 160

Salata [saˈlata] is a village in the administrative district of Gmina Smyków, within Końskie County, Świętokrzyskie Voivodeship, in south-central Poland. It lies approximately 3 km (2 mi) south-east of Smyków, 19 km (12 mi) south of Końskie, and 22 km (14 mi) north-west of the regional capital Kielce.
