= Wola Batorska =

- Village
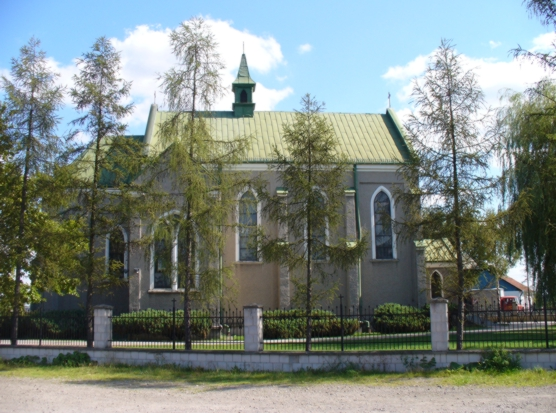
- Church

- Location within Poland
- Coordinates: 50°4′N 20°16′E
- Country: Poland
- Voivodeship: Lesser Poland
- County: Wieliczka
- Gmina: Niepołomice
- Population: 3,000

Wola Batorska [ˈvɔla baˈtɔrska] is a village in the administrative district of Gmina Niepołomice, within Wieliczka County, Lesser Poland Voivodeship, in southern Poland.
