= Słomiróg =

- Village
- Location within Poland
- Coordinates: 49°59′N 20°11′E
- Country: Poland
- Voivodeship: Lesser Poland
- County: Wieliczka
- Gmina: Niepołomice
- Elevation: 270 m (890 ft)
- Population: 500
- Website: www.tecza-slomirog.xt.pl

Słomiróg [swɔˈmiruk] is a village in the administrative district of Gmina Niepołomice, within Wieliczka County, Lesser Poland Voivodeship, in southern Poland.
