= Dziewin, Lesser Poland Voivodeship =

Dziewin
- Village
- Location within Poland
- Coordinates: 50°4′31″N 20°27′19″E
- Country: Poland
- Voivodeship: Lesser Poland
- County: Bochnia
- Gmina: Drwinia

Dziewin [ˈd͡ʑɛvin] is a village in the administrative district of Gmina Drwinia, within Bochnia County, Lesser Poland Voivodeship, in southern Poland.
