= Zagórze, Wieliczka County =

Zagórze
- Village
- Location within Poland
- Coordinates: 49°59′34″N 20°11′18″E
- Country: Poland
- Voivodeship: Lesser Poland
- County: Wieliczka
- Gmina: Niepołomice
- Population: 648

Zagórze [zaˈɡuʐɛ] is a village in the administrative district of Gmina Niepołomice, within Wieliczka County, Lesser Poland Voivodeship, in southern Poland.
