= Staniątki =

- Village
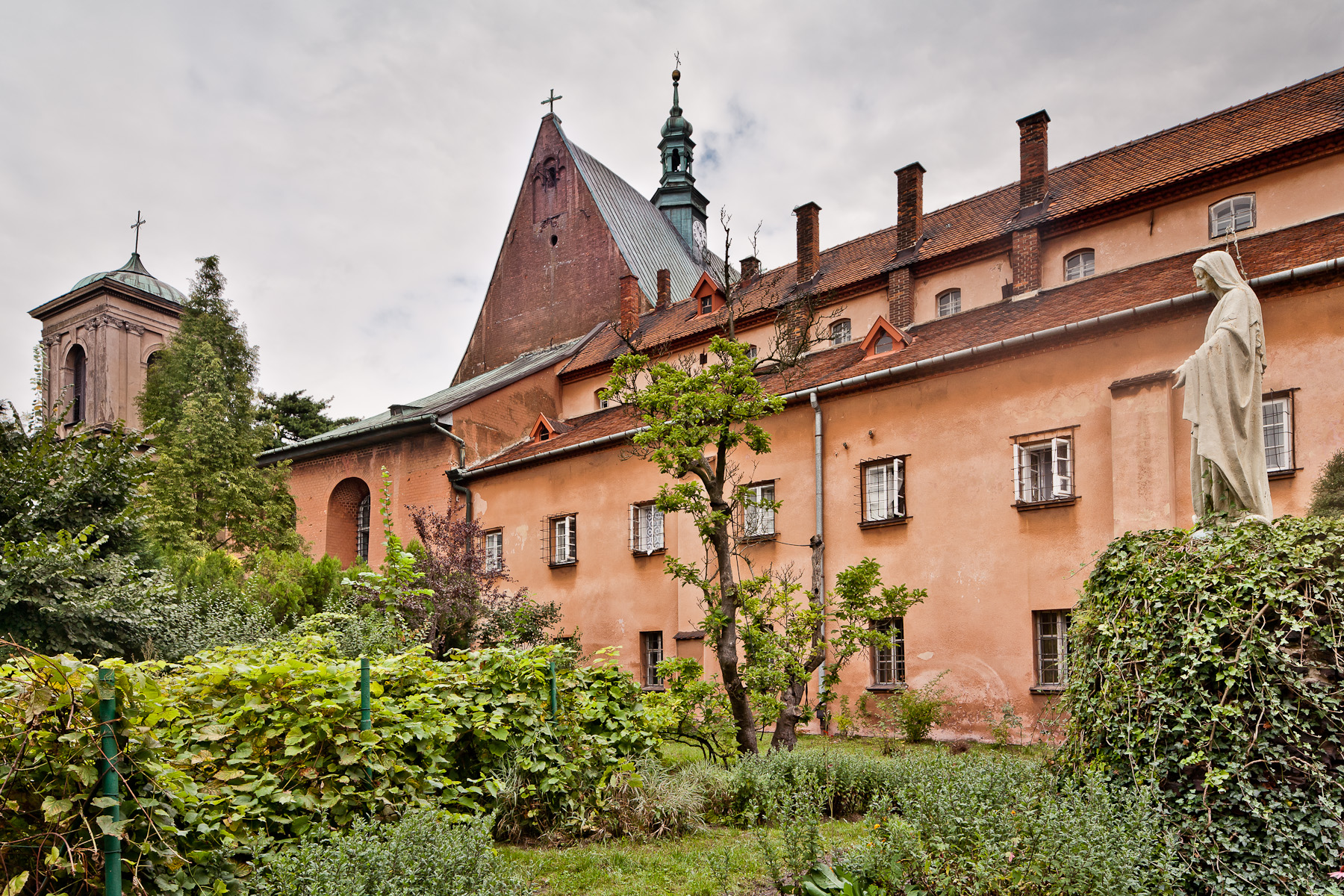
- Benedictine monastery

- Location within Poland
- Coordinates: 50°1′N 20°12′E
- Country: Poland
- Voivodeship: Lesser Poland
- County: Wieliczka
- Gmina: Niepołomice
- Population (approx.): 3,000
- Time zone: UTC+1 (CET)
  - Summer (DST): UTC+2 (CEST)
- Vehicle registration: KWI
- Primary airport: Kraków John Paul II International Airport
- Website: http://www.staniatki.niepolomice.com

Staniątki [staˈɲɔntki] is a village in the administrative district of Gmina Niepołomice, within Wieliczka County, Lesser Poland Voivodeship, in southern Poland.

The village has an approximate population of 3,000.

The local landmark is the Benedictine monastery, which is listed as a Historic Monument of Poland.

== Sports ==
The local football club is Czarni Staniątki. It competes in the lower leagues.
