= Wyżyce =

- Village
- Location within Poland
- Coordinates: 50°5′N 20°29′E
- Country: Poland
- Voivodeship: Lesser Poland
- County: Bochnia
- Gmina: Drwinia

Wyżyce [vɨˈʐɨt͡sɛ] is a village in the administrative district of Gmina Drwinia, within Bochnia County, Lesser Poland Voivodeship, in southern Poland.
