= Suchoraba =

- Village
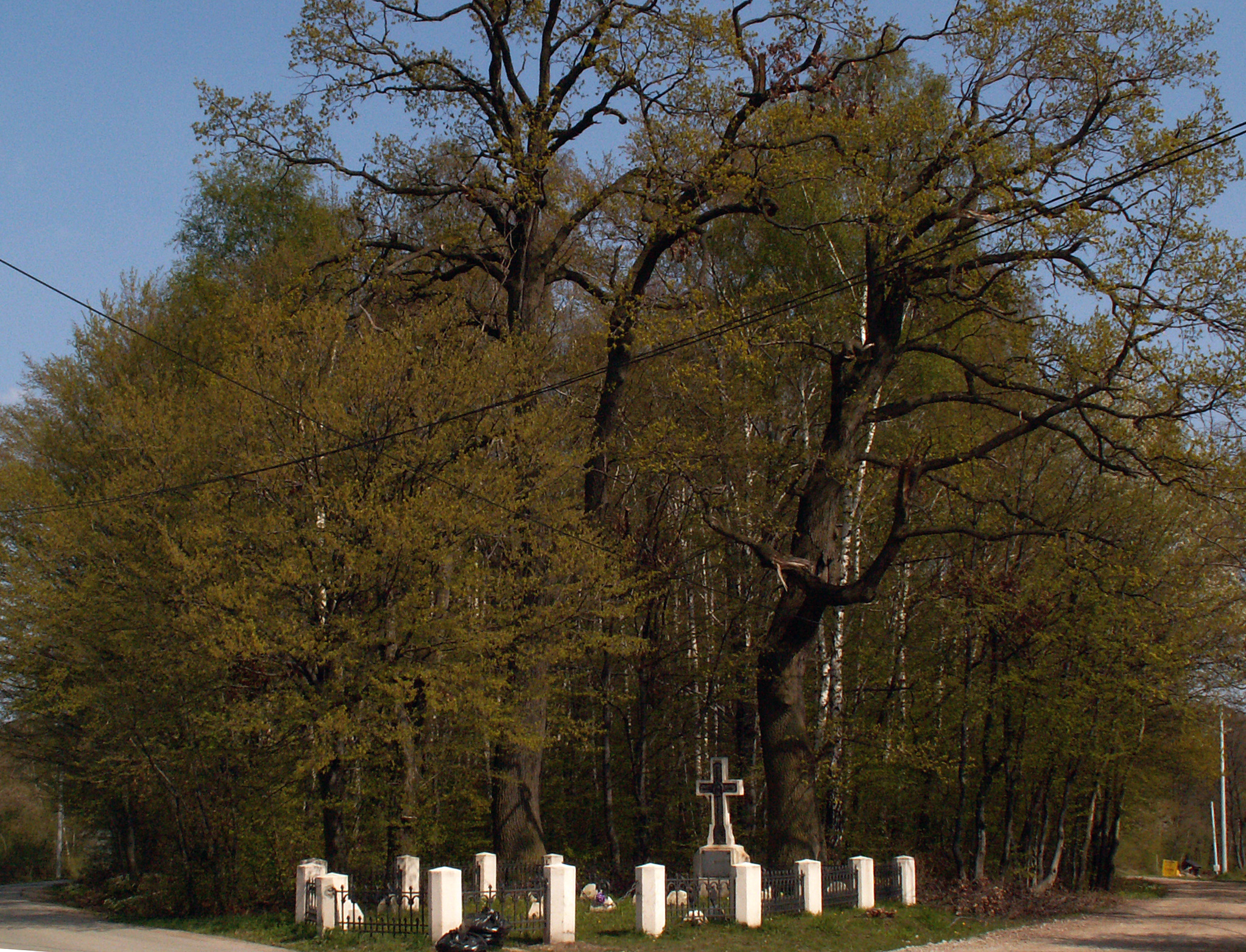
- War cemetery

- Location within Poland
- Coordinates: 49°59′N 20°12′E
- Country: Poland
- Voivodeship: Lesser Poland
- County: Wieliczka
- Gmina: Niepołomice

Suchoraba [suxɔˈraba] is a village in the administrative district of Gmina Niepołomice, within Wieliczka County, Lesser Poland Voivodeship, in southern Poland.
