= Wola Drwińska =

- Village
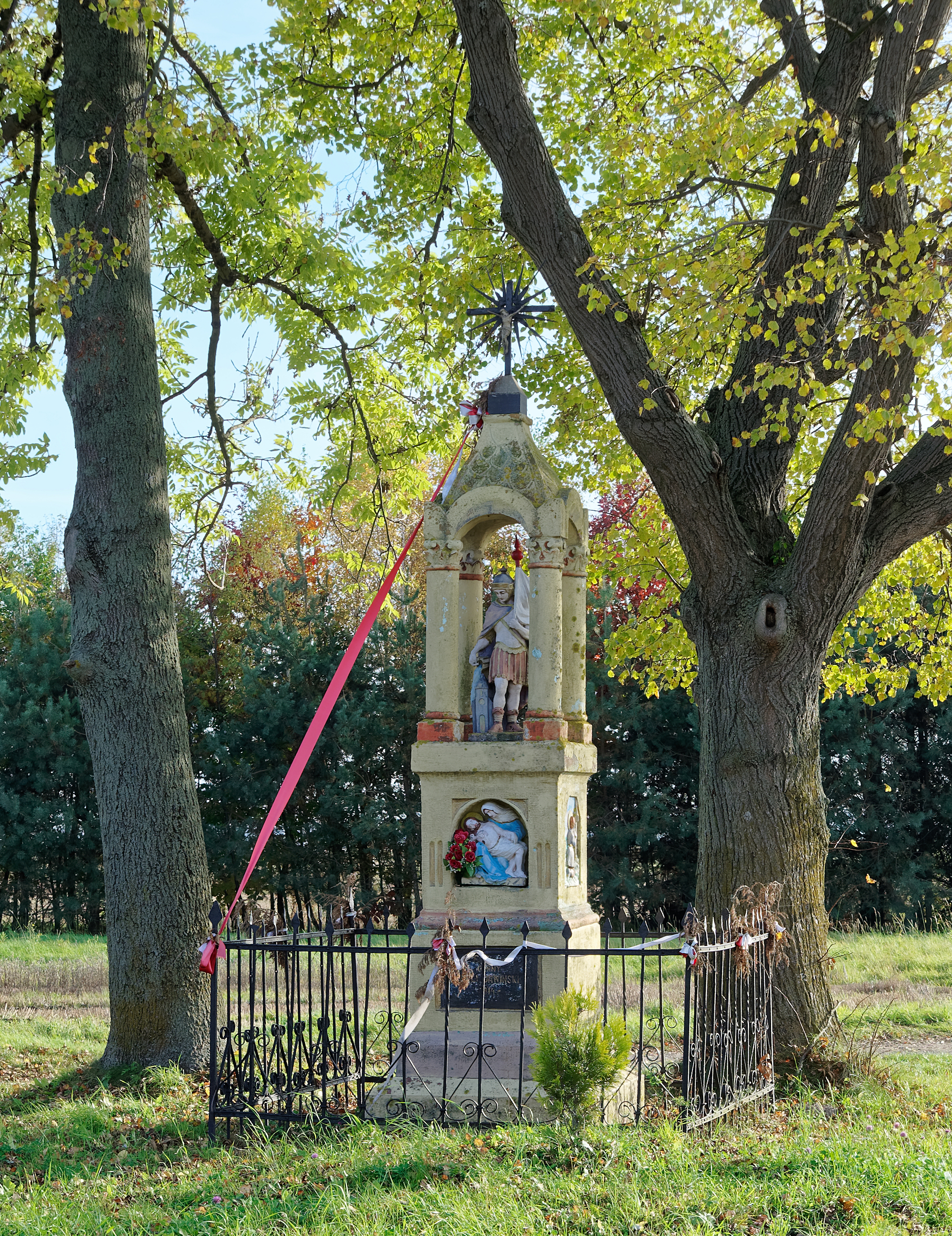
- Chapel

- Location within Poland
- Coordinates: 50°6′N 20°28′E
- Country: Poland
- Voivodeship: Lesser Poland
- County: Bochnia
- Gmina: Drwinia

Wola Drwińska [ˈvɔla ˈdrviɲska] is a village in the administrative district of Gmina Drwinia, within Bochnia County, Lesser Poland Voivodeship, in southern Poland. Wawrzyniec Styczeń was born there.
