= Zakrzowiec =

- Village
- Location within Poland
- Coordinates: 50°00′08″N 20°09′38″E
- Country: Poland
- Voivodeship: Lesser Poland
- County: Wieliczka
- Gmina: Niepołomice

Zakrzowiec [zaˈkʂɔvjɛt͡s] is a village in the administrative district of Gmina Niepołomice, within Wieliczka County, Lesser Poland Voivodeship, in southern Poland.
