= Gmina Drwinia =

Gmina Drwinia Drwinia Commune
- Gmina
- Coat of arms
- Interactive map of Gmina Drwinia
- Coordinates (Drwinia): 50°6′N 20°27′E
- Country: Poland
- Voivodeship: Lesser Poland
- County: Bochnia
- Seat: Drwinia

Area
  - Total: 108.81 km^{2} (42.01 sq mi)

Population (2006)
  - Total: 6,311
  - Density: 58.00/km^{2} (150.2/sq mi)
- Website: http://www.drwinia.gmina.pl/

Gmina Drwinia is a rural gmina (administrative district) in Bochnia County, Lesser Poland Voivodeship, in southern Poland. Its seat is the village of Drwinia, which lies approximately 13 kilometres (8 mi) north of Bochnia and 37 km (23 mi) east of the regional capital Kraków.

The gmina covers an area of 108.81 square kilometres (42.0 sq mi), and as of 2006 its total population is 6,311.

== Villages ==
Gmina Drwinia contains the villages and settlements of Bieńkowice, Drwinia, Dziewin, Gawłówek, Ispina, Mikluszowice, Niedary, Świniary, Trawniki, Wola Drwińska, Wyżyce and Zielona.

== Neighbouring gminas ==
Gmina Drwinia is bordered by the gminas of Bochnia, Igołomia-Wawrzeńczyce, Kłaj, Koszyce, Niepołomice, Nowe Brzesko and Szczurowa.
