= Gmina Smyków =

Gmina Smyków Smyków Commune
- Gmina
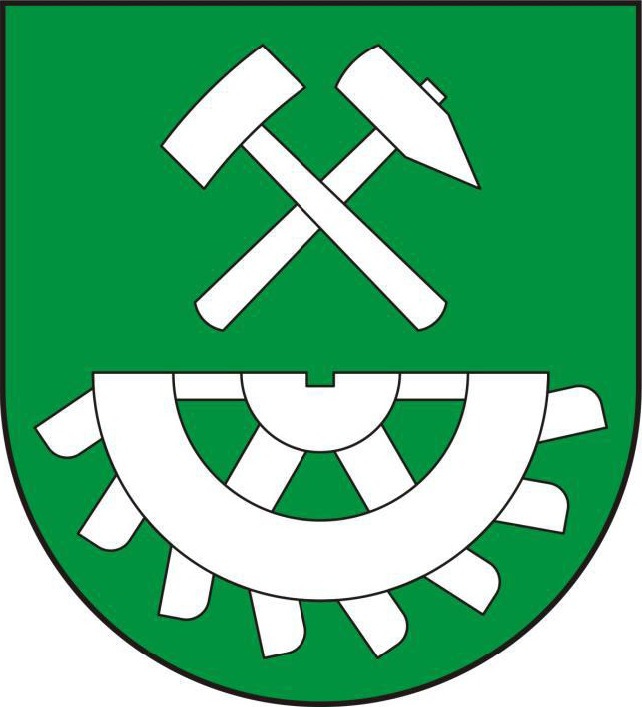
- Coat of arms
- Interactive map of Gmina Smyków
- Coordinates (Smyków): 51°3′10″N 20°23′52″E
- Country: Poland
- Voivodeship: Świętokrzyskie
- County: Końskie
- Seat: Smyków

Area
  - Total: 62.11 km^{2} (23.98 sq mi)

Population (2006)
  - Total: 3,700
  - Density: 60/km^{2} (150/sq mi)
- Website: http://smykow.pl/

Gmina Smyków is a rural gmina (administrative district) in Końskie County, Świętokrzyskie Voivodeship, in south-central Poland. Its seat is the village of Smyków, which lies approximately 17 kilometres (11 mi) south of Końskie and 25 km (16 mi) north-west of the regional capital Kielce.

The gmina covers an area of 62.11 square kilometres (24.0 sq mi), and as of 2006 its total population is 3,700.

== Villages ==
Gmina Smyków contains the villages and settlements of Adamów, Cisownik, Kozów, Królewiec, Matyniów, Miedzierza, Przyłogi, Salata, Smyków, Stanowiska, Strażnica, Świnków, Trawniki and Wólka Smolana.

== Neighbouring gminas ==
Gmina Smyków is bordered by the gminas of Końskie, Mniów, Radoszyce and Stąporków.
