= Kozów, Świętokrzyskie Voivodeship =

Kozów
- Village
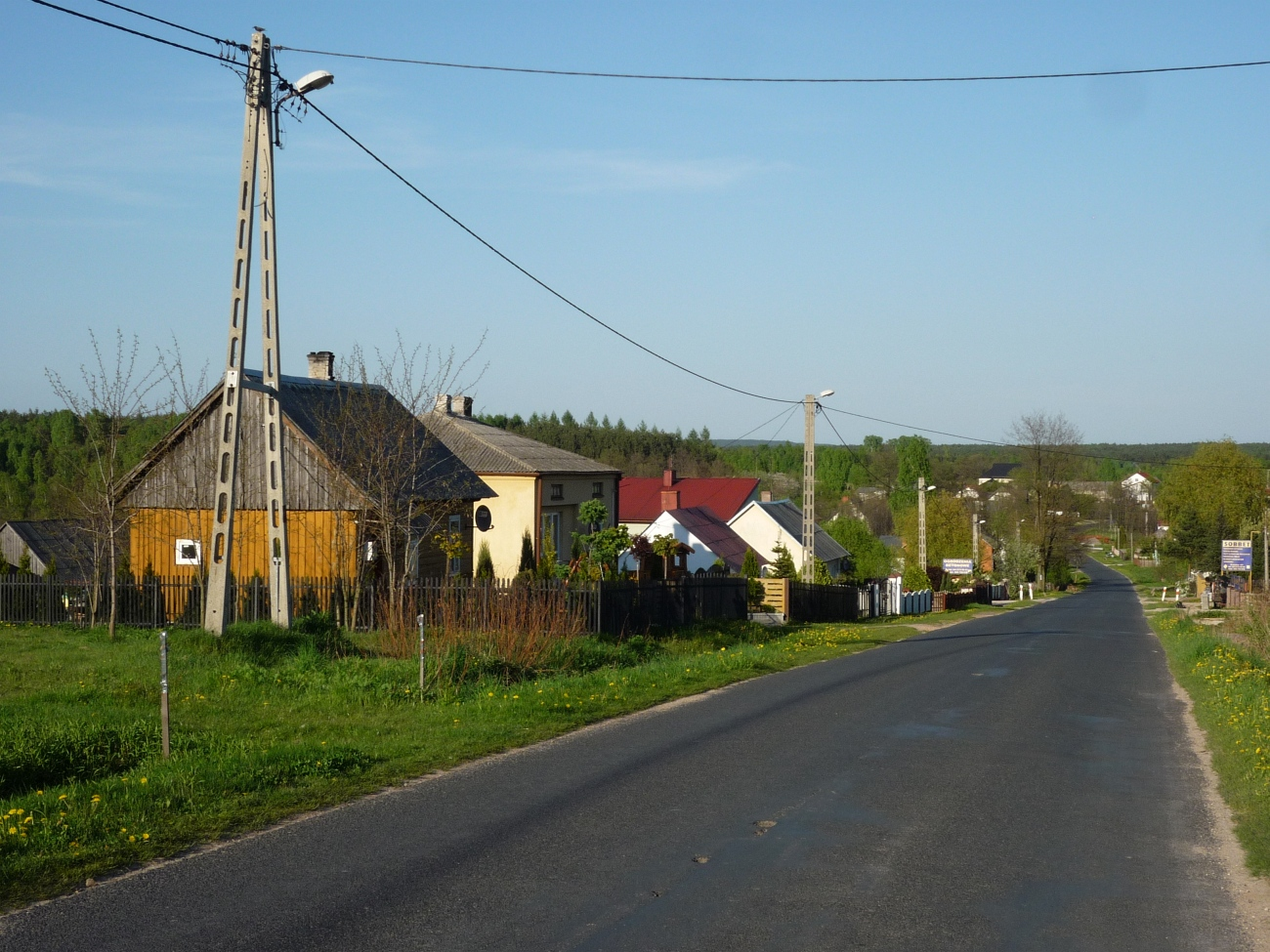

- Location within Poland
- Coordinates: 51°3′25″N 20°20′48″E
- Country: Poland
- Voivodeship: Świętokrzyskie
- County: Końskie
- Gmina: Smyków
- Population: 400

Kozów [ˈkɔzuf] is a village in the administrative district of Gmina Smyków, within Końskie County, Świętokrzyskie Voivodeship, in south-central Poland. It lies approximately 4 km (2 mi) west of Smyków, 17 km (11 mi) south of Końskie, and 28 km (17 mi) north-west of the regional capital Kielce.
