= Niedary, Lesser Poland Voivodeship =

Niedary
- Village
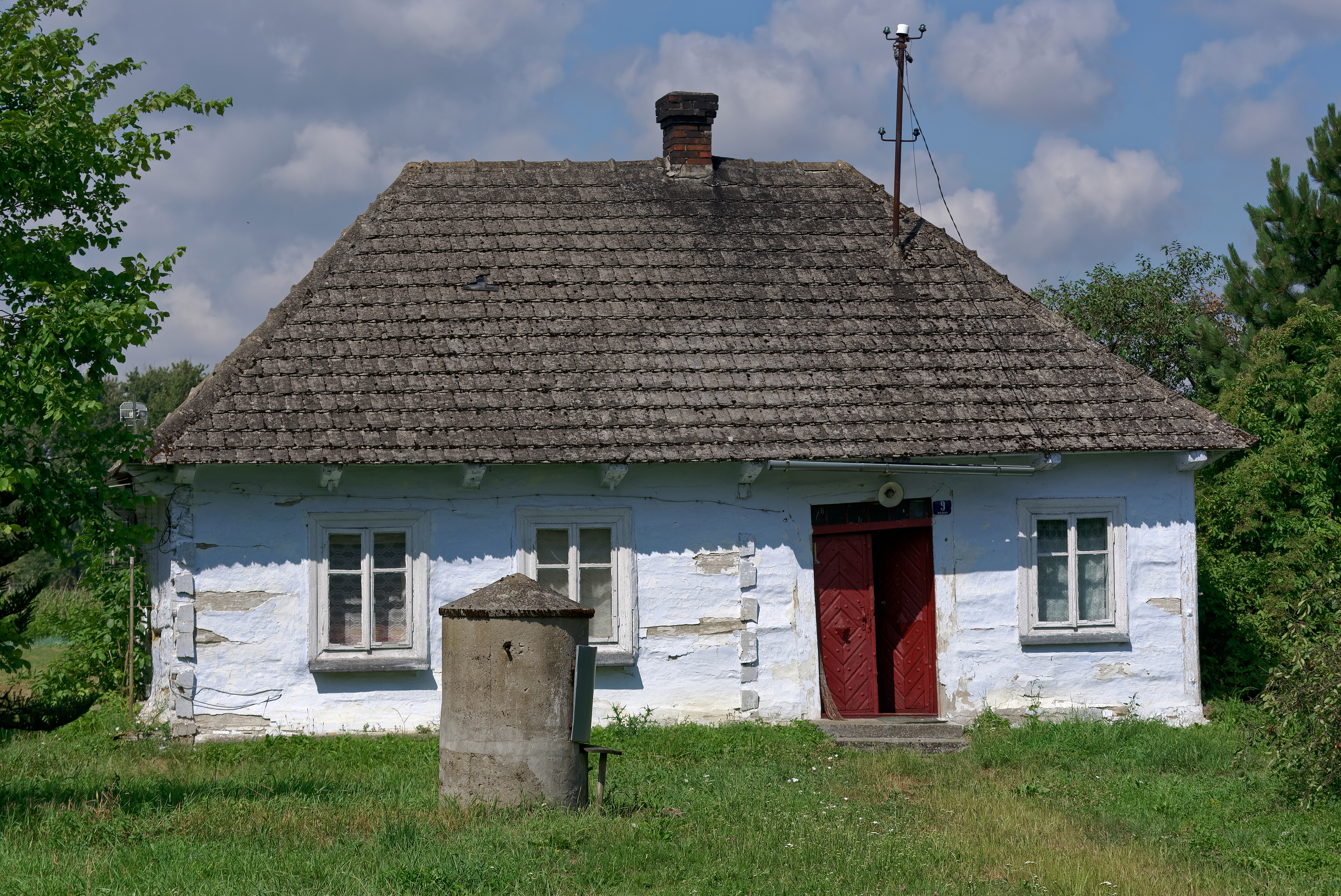
- Wooden house

- Location within Poland
- Coordinates: 50°7′N 20°30′E
- Country: Poland
- Voivodeship: Lesser Poland
- County: Bochnia
- Gmina: Drwinia

Niedary [ɲɛˈdarɨ] is a village in the administrative district of Gmina Drwinia, within Bochnia County, Lesser Poland Voivodeship, in southern Poland.
