= Ochmanów =

- Village
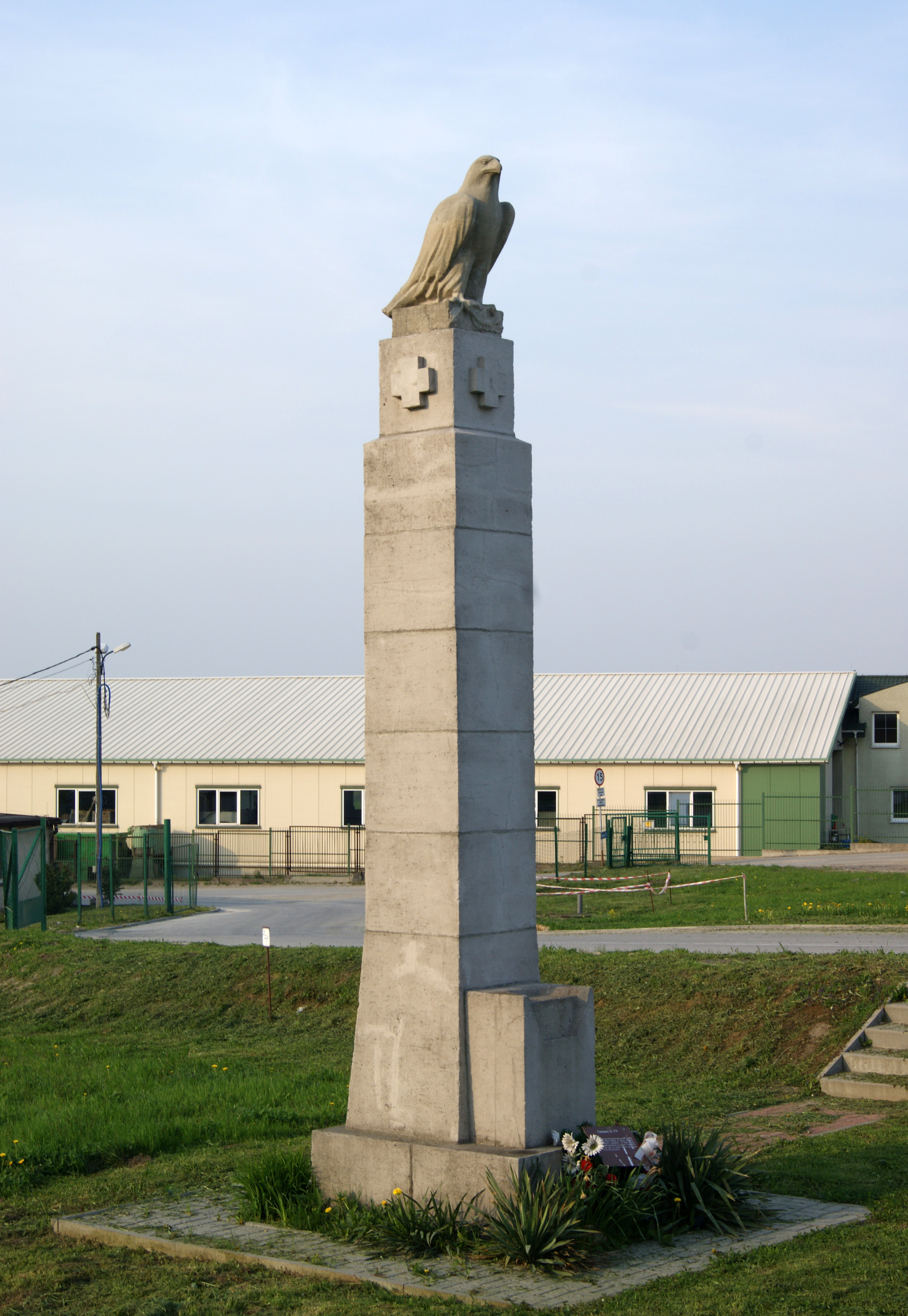
- War cemetery

- Location within Poland
- Coordinates: 50°0′N 20°9′E
- Country: Poland
- Voivodeship: Lesser Poland
- County: Wieliczka
- Gmina: Niepołomice
- Population: 543

Ochmanów [ɔxˈmanuf] is a village in the administrative district of Gmina Niepołomice, within Wieliczka County, Lesser Poland Voivodeship, in southern Poland.
