= Świniary, Lesser Poland Voivodeship =

Świniary
- Village
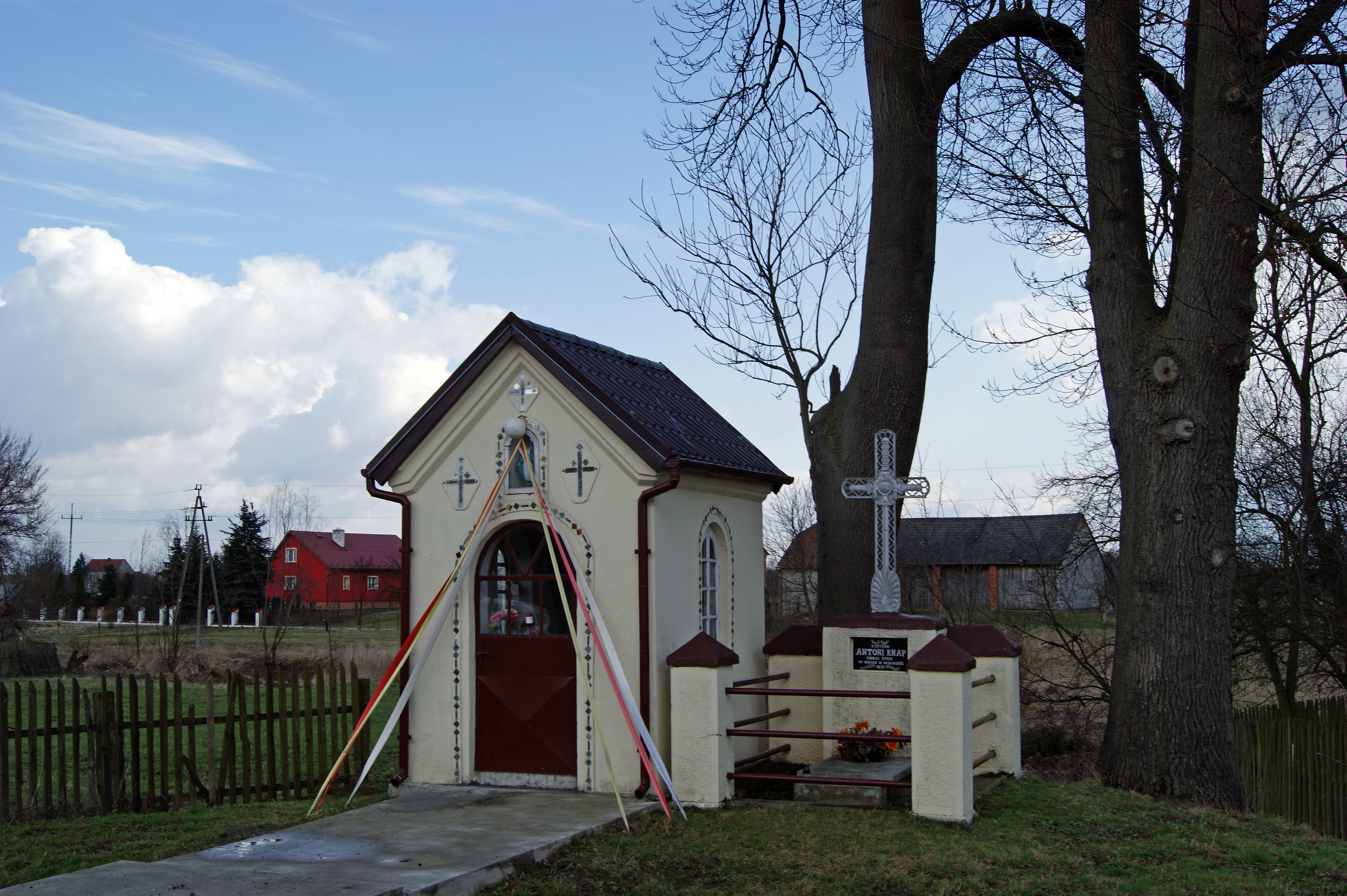
- Chapel

- Location within Poland
- Coordinates: 50°7′50″N 20°27′55″E
- Country: Poland
- Voivodeship: Lesser Poland
- County: Bochnia
- Gmina: Drwinia

Świniary [ɕfiˈɲarɨ] is a village in the administrative district of Gmina Drwinia, within Bochnia County, Lesser Poland Voivodeship, in southern Poland.
