= Trawniki, Lesser Poland Voivodeship =

Trawniki
- Village
- Location within Poland
- Coordinates: 50°07′52″N 20°24′43″E
- Country: Poland
- Voivodeship: Lesser Poland
- County: Bochnia
- Gmina: Drwinia

Trawniki [travˈniki] is a village in the administrative district of Gmina Drwinia, within Bochnia County, Lesser Poland Voivodeship, in southern Poland.
