= Bieńkowice, Bochnia County =

Bieńkowice
- Village
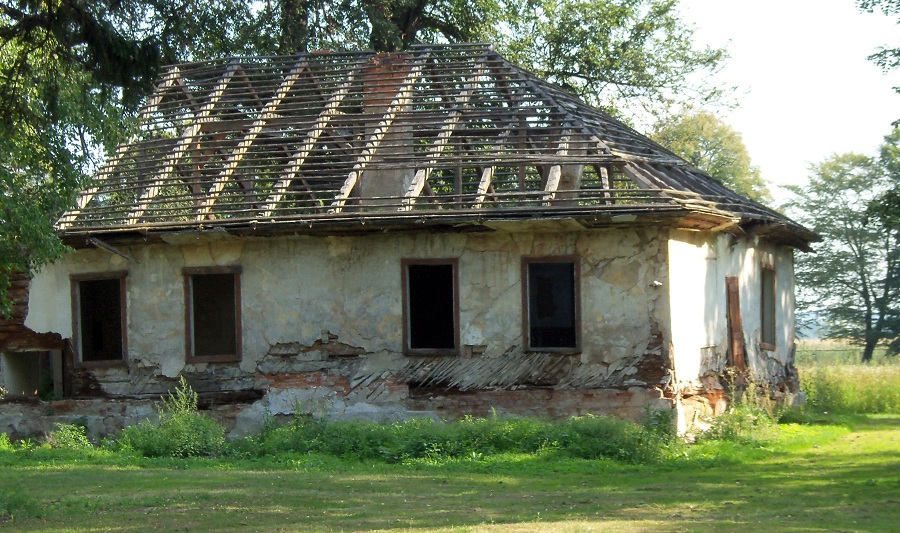
- Manor house

- Location within Poland
- Coordinates: 50°5′58″N 20°29′46″E
- Country: Poland
- Voivodeship: Lesser Poland
- County: Bochnia
- Gmina: Drwinia

Bieńkowice [bjɛɲkɔˈvit͡sɛ] is a village in the administrative district of Gmina Drwinia, within Bochnia County, Lesser Poland Voivodeship, in southern Poland.
