= Mikluszowice =

- Village
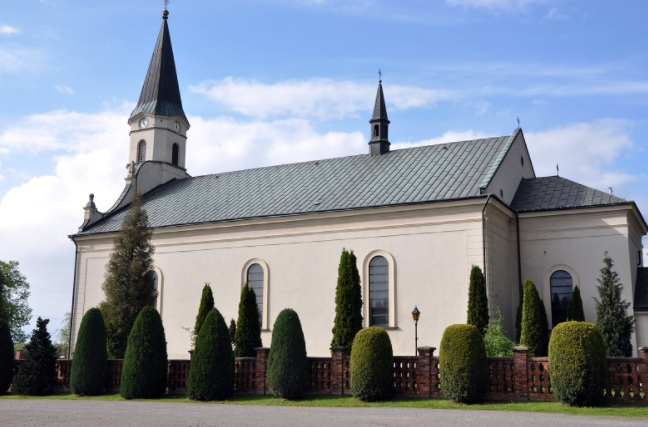
- Catholic church

- Location within Poland
- Coordinates: 50°3′N 20°27′E
- Country: Poland
- Voivodeship: Lesser Poland
- County: Bochnia
- Gmina: Drwinia
- Population: 800

Mikluszowice [mikluʂɔˈvit͡sɛ] is a village in the administrative district of Gmina Drwinia, within Bochnia County, Lesser Poland Voivodeship, in southern Poland.
