= Gmina Niepołomice =

Gmina Niepołomice Niepołomice Commune
- Gmina
- Coat of arms
- Interactive map of Gmina Niepołomice
- Coordinates (Niepołomice): 50°2′2″N 20°13′2″E
- Country: Poland
- Voivodeship: Lesser Poland
- County: Wieliczka
- Seat: Niepołomice

Area
  - Total: 95.1 km^{2} (36.7 sq mi)

Population (2006)
  - Total: 22,168
  - Density: 233/km^{2} (604/sq mi)
  - Urban: 8,537
  - Rural: 13,631
- Website: www.niepolomice.com

Gmina Niepołomice is an urban-rural gmina (administrative district) in Wieliczka County, Lesser Poland Voivodeship, in southern Poland. Its seat is the town of Niepołomice, which lies approximately 12 kilometres (7 mi) north-east of Wieliczka and 21 km (13 mi) east of the regional capital Kraków.

The gmina covers an area of 95.1 square kilometres (36.7 sq mi), and as of 2006 its total population is 22,168 (out of which the population of Niepołomice amounts to 8,537, and the population of the rural part of the gmina is 13,631).

== Villages ==
Apart from the town of Niepołomice, Gmina Niepołomice contains the villages and settlements of Chobot, Ochmanów, Podłęże, Słomiróg, Staniątki, Suchoraba, Wola Batorska, Wola Zabierzowska, Zagórze, Zakrzów and Zakrzowiec.

== Neighbouring gminy ==
Gmina Niepołomice is bordered by the city of Kraków and by the gminy of Biskupice, Drwinia, Gdów, Igołomia-Wawrzeńczyce, Kłaj and Wieliczka.
