= Niepołomice =

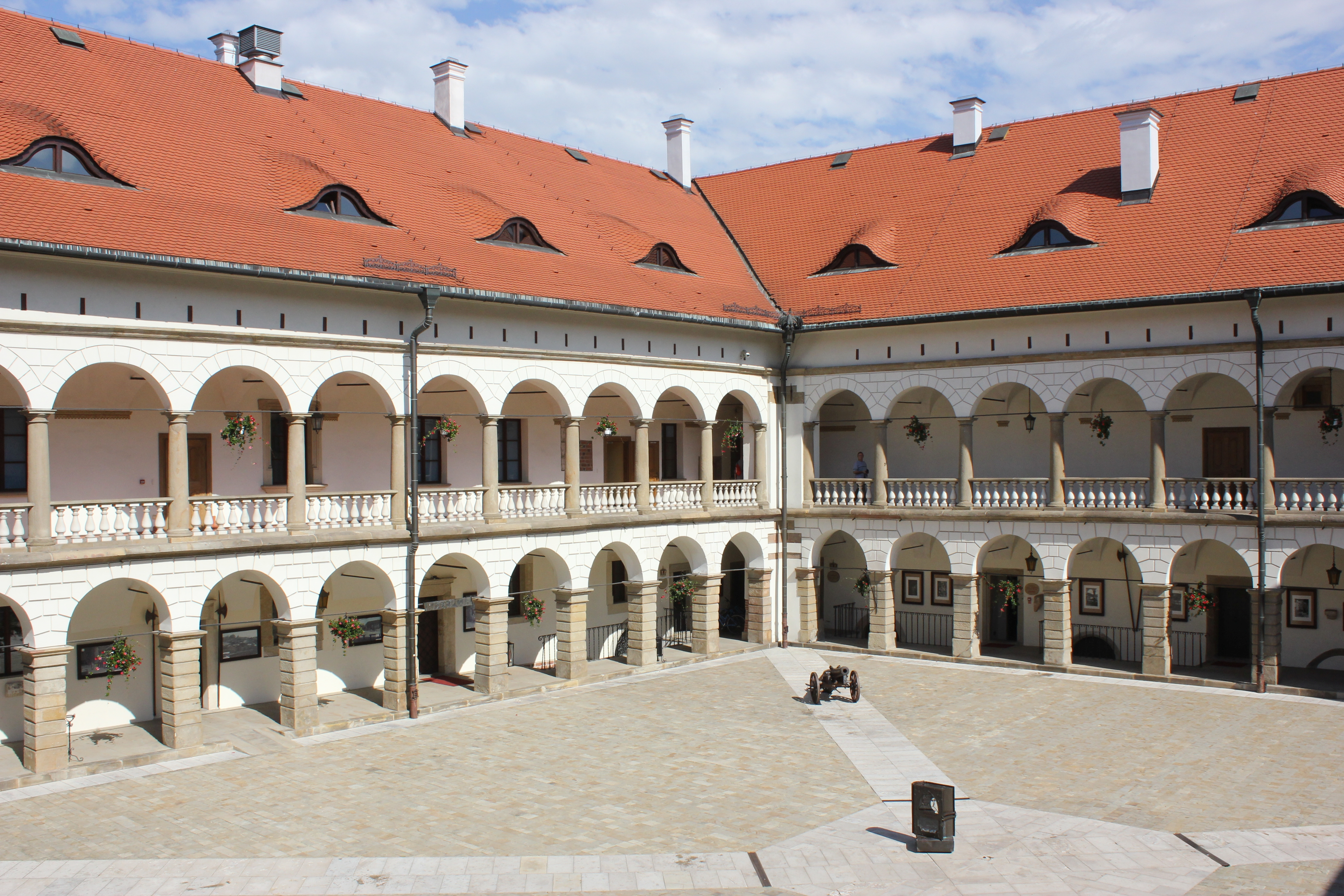
- Inner courtyard of the Niepołomice Castle built by Casimir III the Great

- Flag Coat of arms

- Location within Poland
- Coordinates: 50°2′2″N 20°13′2″E
- Country: Poland
- Voivodeship: Lesser Poland
- County: Wieliczka
- Gmina: Niepołomice

Government
  - Mayor: Michał Hebda

Area
  - Total: 27.1 km^{2} (10.5 sq mi)

Population (2022)
  - Total: 16,493
  - Density: 609/km^{2} (1,580/sq mi)
- Time zone: UTC+1 (CET)
  - Summer (DST): UTC+2 (CEST)
- Postal code: 32-005
- Car plates: KWI
- Website: http://www.niepolomice.eu/

Niepołomice (pronounced Niepowomitse [ɲɛpɔwɔˈmʲit͡sɛ]) is a town in southern Poland, seat of Gmina Niepołomice in the Wieliczka County in the Lesser Poland Voivodeship.

It is situated on the Vistula River, on the verge of the large virgin Niepołomice Forest.

There is a 14th-century hunting castle in town initially built by Casimir III, as well as a conservation center for European bison (Polish: Żubry) nearby.

The town is also home to professional football club Puszcza Niepołomice.

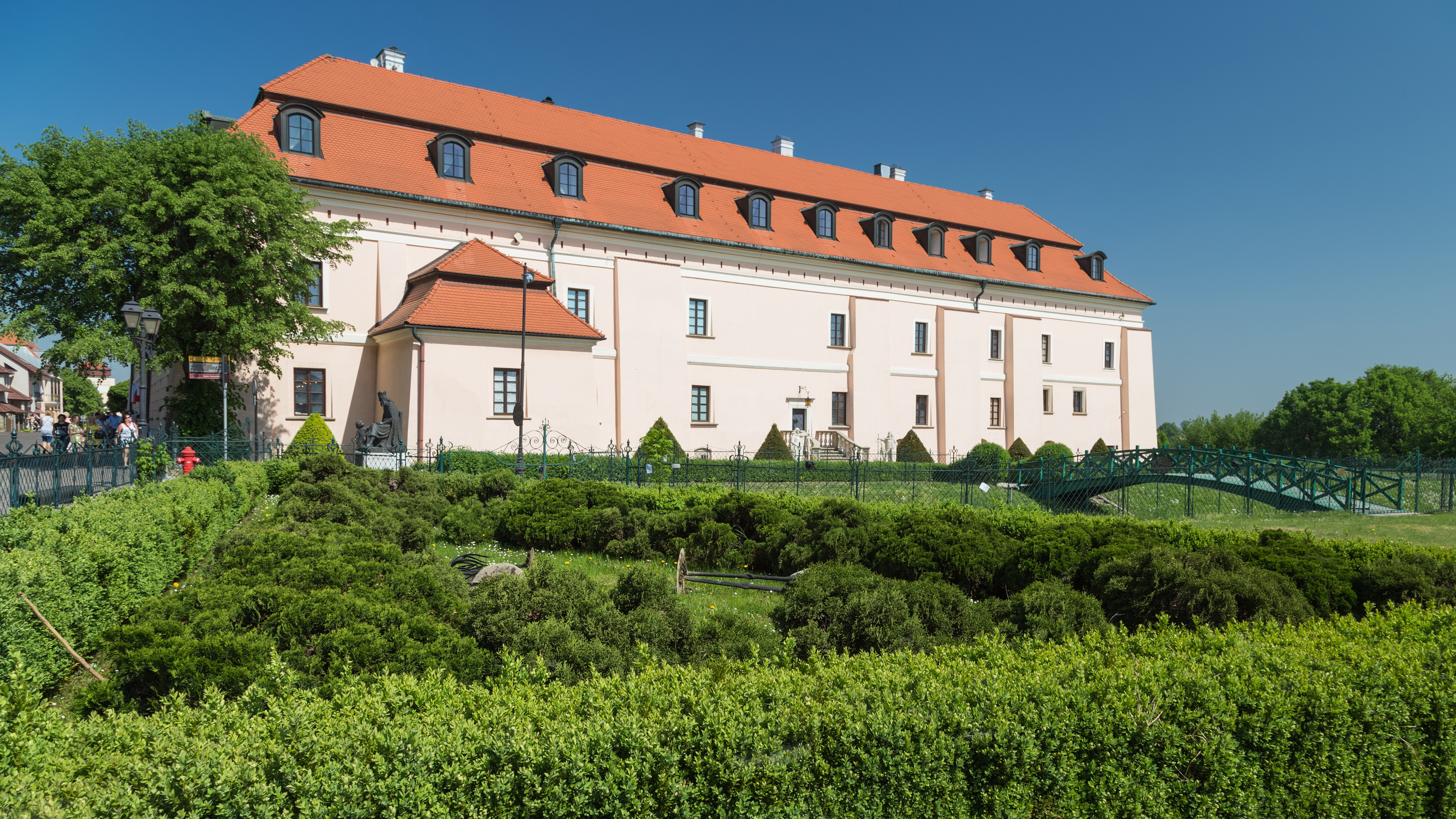
Hunting castle, exterior

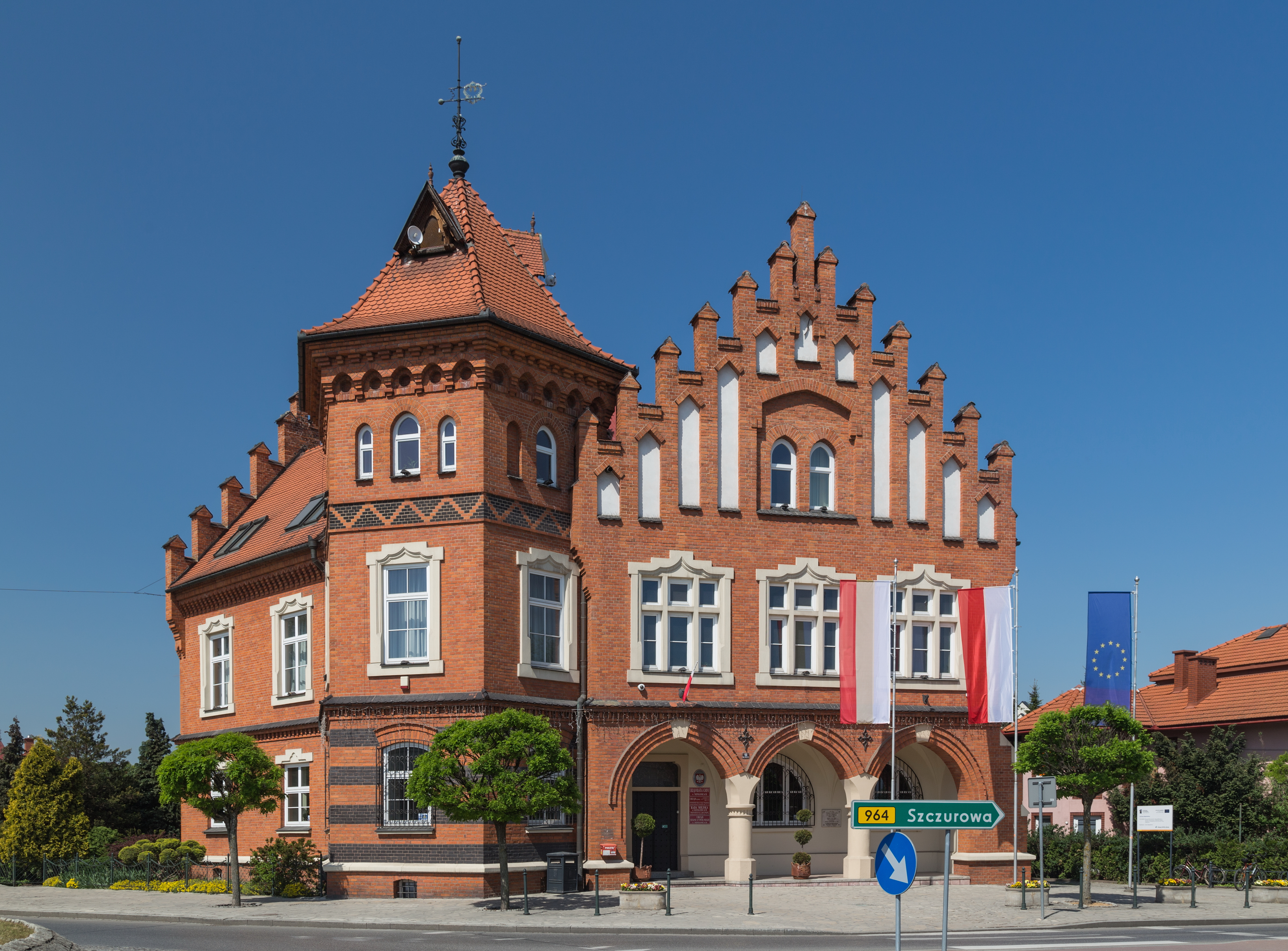
Town hall

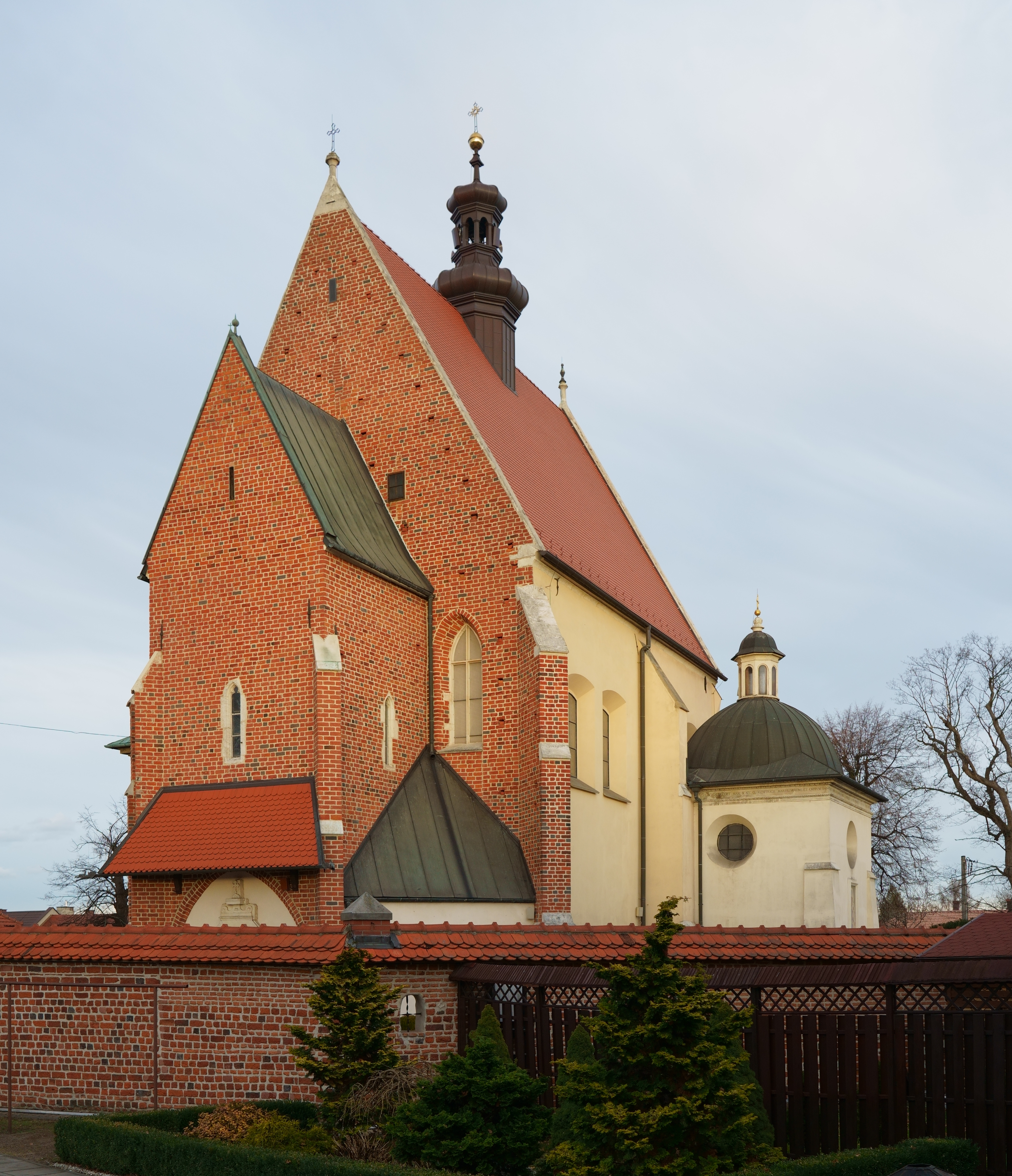
Church of 10,000 Martyrs
