= Smyków, Gmina Smyków =

Smyków
- Village
- Location within Poland
- Coordinates: 51°3′10″N 20°23′52″E
- Country: Poland
- Voivodeship: Świętokrzyskie
- County: Końskie
- Gmina: Smyków
- Population: 290

Smyków [ˈsmɨkuf] is a village in Końskie County, Świętokrzyskie Voivodeship, in south-central Poland. It is the seat of the gmina (administrative district) called Gmina Smyków. It lies approximately 17 km (11 mi) south of Końskie and 25 km (16 mi) north-west of the regional capital Kielce.
