= Wieniawa =

Wieniawa may refer to:

- Wieniawa, Masovian Voivodeship, east-central Poland
- Wieniawa Commune, Masovian Voivodeship, in east-central Poland
- Bolesław Wieniawa-Długoszowski (1881–1942), Polish General
- Henryk Wieniawski (1835–1880), Polish violinist and composer
- Julia Wieniawa (born 1998), Polish pop singer and actress

== See also ==
- Wieniawski (disambiguation)
