= Marysin =

Marysin may refer to the following places:

- Marysin, Lower Silesian Voivodeship (south-west Poland)
- Marysin, Kuyavian-Pomeranian Voivodeship (central Poland)
- Marysin, Gmina Rejowiec in Lublin Voivodeship (east Poland)
- Marysin, Gmina Mircze in Lublin Voivodeship (east Poland)
- Marysin, Gmina Uchanie in Lublin Voivodeship (east Poland)
- Marysin, Gmina Fajsławice in Lublin Voivodeship (east Poland)
- Marysin, Gmina Bychawa in Lublin Voivodeship (east Poland)
- Marysin, Gmina Jastków in Lublin Voivodeship (east Poland)
- Marysin, Świdnik County in Lublin Voivodeship (east Poland)
- Marysin, Gmina Telatyn in Lublin Voivodeship (east Poland)
- Marysin, Gmina Tyszowce in Lublin Voivodeship (east Poland)
- Marysin, Grójec County in Masovian Voivodeship (east-central Poland)
- Marysin, Mińsk County in Masovian Voivodeship (east-central Poland)
- Marysin, Piaseczno County in Masovian Voivodeship (east-central Poland)
- Marysin, Gmina Gielniów in Masovian Voivodeship (east-central Poland)
- Marysin, Gmina Potworów in Masovian Voivodeship (east-central Poland)
- Marysin, Siedlce County in Masovian Voivodeship (east-central Poland)
- Marysin, Sochaczew County in Masovian Voivodeship (east-central Poland)
- Marysin, Wołomin County in Masovian Voivodeship (east-central Poland)
- Marysin, Żuromin County in Masovian Voivodeship (north-central Poland)
- Marysin, Gniezno County in Greater Poland Voivodeship (west-central Poland)
- Marysin, Turek County in Greater Poland Voivodeship (central Poland)
- Marysin, Lubusz Voivodeship (west Poland)
- Marysin, Opole Voivodeship (south Poland)
- Marysin, West Pomeranian Voivodeship (north-west Poland)
