= Wymysłów =

Wymysłów may refer to the following places:

- Wymysłów, Kutno County in Łódź Voivodeship (central Poland)
- Wymysłów, Gmina Kobiele Wielkie in Łódź Voivodeship (central Poland)
- Wymysłów, Gmina Przedbórz in Łódź Voivodeship (central Poland)
- Wymysłów, Gmina Żytno in Łódź Voivodeship (central Poland)
- Wymysłów, Skierniewice County in Łódź Voivodeship (central Poland)
- Wymysłów, Zduńska Wola County in Łódź Voivodeship (central Poland)
- Wymysłów, Gmina Miechów in Lesser Poland Voivodeship (south Poland)
- Wymysłów, Gmina Słaboszów in Lesser Poland Voivodeship (south Poland)
- Wymysłów, Olkusz County in Lesser Poland Voivodeship (south Poland)
- Wymysłów, Kraśnik County in Lublin Voivodeship (east Poland)
- Wymysłów, Gmina Karczmiska in Opole County, Lublin Voivodeship (east Poland)
- Wymysłów, Kazimierza County in Świętokrzyskie Voivodeship (south-central Poland)
- Wymysłów, Ostrowiec County in Świętokrzyskie Voivodeship (south-central Poland)
- Wymysłów, Gmina Działoszyce in Świętokrzyskie Voivodeship (south-central Poland)
- Wymysłów, Gmina Kije in Świętokrzyskie Voivodeship (south-central Poland)
- Wymysłów, Gmina Złota in Świętokrzyskie Voivodeship (south-central Poland)
- Wymysłów, Gmina Połaniec in Świętokrzyskie Voivodeship (south-central Poland)
- Wymysłów, Gmina Szydłów in Świętokrzyskie Voivodeship (south-central Poland)
- Wymysłów, Włoszczowa County in Świętokrzyskie Voivodeship (south-central Poland)
- Wymysłów, Kozienice County in Masovian Voivodeship (east-central Poland)
- Wymysłów, Gmina Borkowice in Masovian Voivodeship (east-central Poland)
- Wymysłów, Gmina Potworów in Masovian Voivodeship (east-central Poland)
- Wymysłów, Gmina Skaryszew in Masovian Voivodeship (east-central Poland)
- Wymysłów, Gmina Wolanów in Masovian Voivodeship (east-central Poland)
- Wymysłów, Sochaczew County in Masovian Voivodeship (east-central Poland)
- Wymysłów, Żyrardów County in Masovian Voivodeship (east-central Poland)
- Wymysłów, Słupca County in Greater Poland Voivodeship (west-central Poland)
- Wymysłów, Turek County in Greater Poland Voivodeship (west-central Poland)
- Wymysłów, Silesian Voivodeship (south Poland)
