= Kozłowiec Transmitter =

- Interactive map of the Kozłowiec Transmitter area

General information
- Status: Completed
- Type: TV Mast
- Location: Kozłowiec/Przysucha, Poland
- Completed: 1998

Height
- Height: 213 m (698.82 ft)

Kozłowiec Transmitter
- Coordinates: 51°21′30″N 20°34′19″E
- Voivodeship: Masovian Voivodeship
- County: Przysucha County
- Gmina: Przysucha

Kozłowiec Transmitter (RTCN Kozłowiec) is a 213-metre-tall (699 ft) guyed mast for FM and TV situated at Kozłowiec, Masovian Voivodeship in Poland. This transmitter mast, which was built in 1998

== Transmitted Programmes ==
=== Digital television MPEG-4 ===
Multiplex Number	Programme in Multiplex	Frequency	Channel	Power ERP	Polarisation	Antenna Diagram	Modulation	FEC
Multiplex 1	TVP1; Stopklatka TV; TVP ABC; TV Trwam; Eska TV; TTV; Polo TV; ATM Rozrywka	586 MHz	30	50 kW	Horizontal	ND	64 QAM	5/6
Multiplex 2	Polsat; TVN; TV4; TV Puls; TVN 7; Puls 2; TV6; Super Polsat	602 MHz	37	50 kW	Horizontal	ND	64 QAM	5/6
Multiplex 3	TVP1 HD; TVP2 HD; TVP Kielce; TVP Kultura; TVP Historia; TVP Polonia; TVP Rozrywka; TVP Info	514 MHz	26	10 kW	Horizontal	ND	64 QAM	5/6

=== FM Radio ===
Program	Frequency	Power ERP	Polarisation	Antenna Diagram
Polskie Radio Program I	92,00 MHz	10 kW	Horizontal	ND
Radio ZET	102,90 MHz	12 kW	Horizontal	ND
Polskie Radio Program II	104,80 MHz	10 kW	Horizontal	ND

== See also ==
- List of masts
