= Kochanovce =

Kochanovce may refer to:

- Kochanovce, Humenné, in Humenné District, Slovakia
- Kochanovce, Bardejov, in Bardejov District, Slovakia
- Adamovské Kochanovce, a village and municipality in Trenčín District, Trenčín Region, Slovakia

== See also ==
- Kochanów (disambiguation)
