= Dluskis =

- Lithuanian surname
- m.: Dluskis
- f.: (unmarried): Dluskytė
- f.: (married): Dluskienė
- Related names: Polish: Dłuski

Dluskis is a Lithuanian surname. Notable people with the surname include:

- Boleslovas Dluskis (1829–1905), Lithuanian painter, doctor, and rebel against the Russian Empire
- Mykolas Dluskis (1760 – 1821), Lithuanian painter
