= Dłuski =

Dłuski (masculine), Dłuska (feminine) is a Polish surname.

- Bolesław Roman Dłuski
- Bronisława Dłuska
- Janina Dłuska, Polish artist
- Kazimierz Dłuski
- Michał Dłuski

== See also ==
- Dłuska Wola, Masovian Voivodeship, Poland
