= Konary, Przysucha County =

Konary
- Settlement
- Location within Poland
- Coordinates: 51°24′42″N 20°50′45″E
- Country: Poland
- Voivodeship: Masovian
- County: Przysucha
- Gmina: Wieniawa

Konary [kɔˈnarɨ] is a settlement in the administrative district of Gmina Wieniawa, within Przysucha County, Masovian Voivodeship, in east-central Poland.
