= Zawada, Masovian Voivodeship =

Zawada
- Village
- Location within Poland
- Coordinates: 51°22′55″N 20°35′40″E
- Country: Poland
- Voivodeship: Masovian
- County: Przysucha
- Gmina: Przysucha

Zawada [zaˈvada] is a village in the administrative district of Gmina Przysucha, within Przysucha County, Masovian Voivodeship, in east-central Poland.
