= Dębiny, Przysucha County =

Dębiny
- Village
- Location within Poland
- Coordinates: 51°25′17″N 20°43′46″E
- Country: Poland
- Voivodeship: Masovian
- County: Przysucha
- Gmina: Przysucha
- Population: 210

Dębiny [dɛmˈbinɨ] is a village in the administrative district of Gmina Przysucha, within Przysucha County, Masovian Voivodeship, in east-central Poland.

In 2005 the village had a population of 210.
