= Lipno, Przysucha County =

Lipno
- Village
- Location within Poland
- Coordinates: 51°22′0″N 20°35′42″E
- Country: Poland
- Voivodeship: Masovian
- County: Przysucha
- Gmina: Przysucha
- Population: 240

Lipno (Polish pronunciation: [ˈlipnɔ]) is a village in the administrative district of Gmina Przysucha in Przysucha County, Masovian Voivodeship, in east-central Poland.
