= Wir-Kolonia =

- Village
- Location within Poland
- Coordinates: 51°27′54″N 20°44′42″E
- Country: Poland
- Voivodeship: Masovian
- County: Przysucha
- Gmina: Potworów
- Population: 140

Wir-Kolonia [ˈvir kɔˈlɔɲa] is a village in the administrative district of Gmina Potworów, within Przysucha County, Masovian Voivodeship, in east-central Poland.
