= Mariówka =

- Village
- Location within Poland
- Coordinates: 51°23′34″N 20°36′12″E
- Country: Poland
- Voivodeship: Masovian
- County: Przysucha
- Gmina: Przysucha

Mariówka [maˈrjufka] is a village in the administrative district of Gmina Przysucha, within Przysucha County, Masovian Voivodeship, in east-central Poland.
