= Beźnik =

- Village
- Location within Poland
- Coordinates: 51°26′N 20°43′E
- Country: Poland
- Voivodeship: Masovian
- County: Przysucha
- Gmina: Przysucha

Beźnik [ˈbɛʑnik] is a village in the administrative district of Gmina Przysucha, within Przysucha County, Masovian Voivodeship, in east-central Poland.
