= Zdonków =

- Village
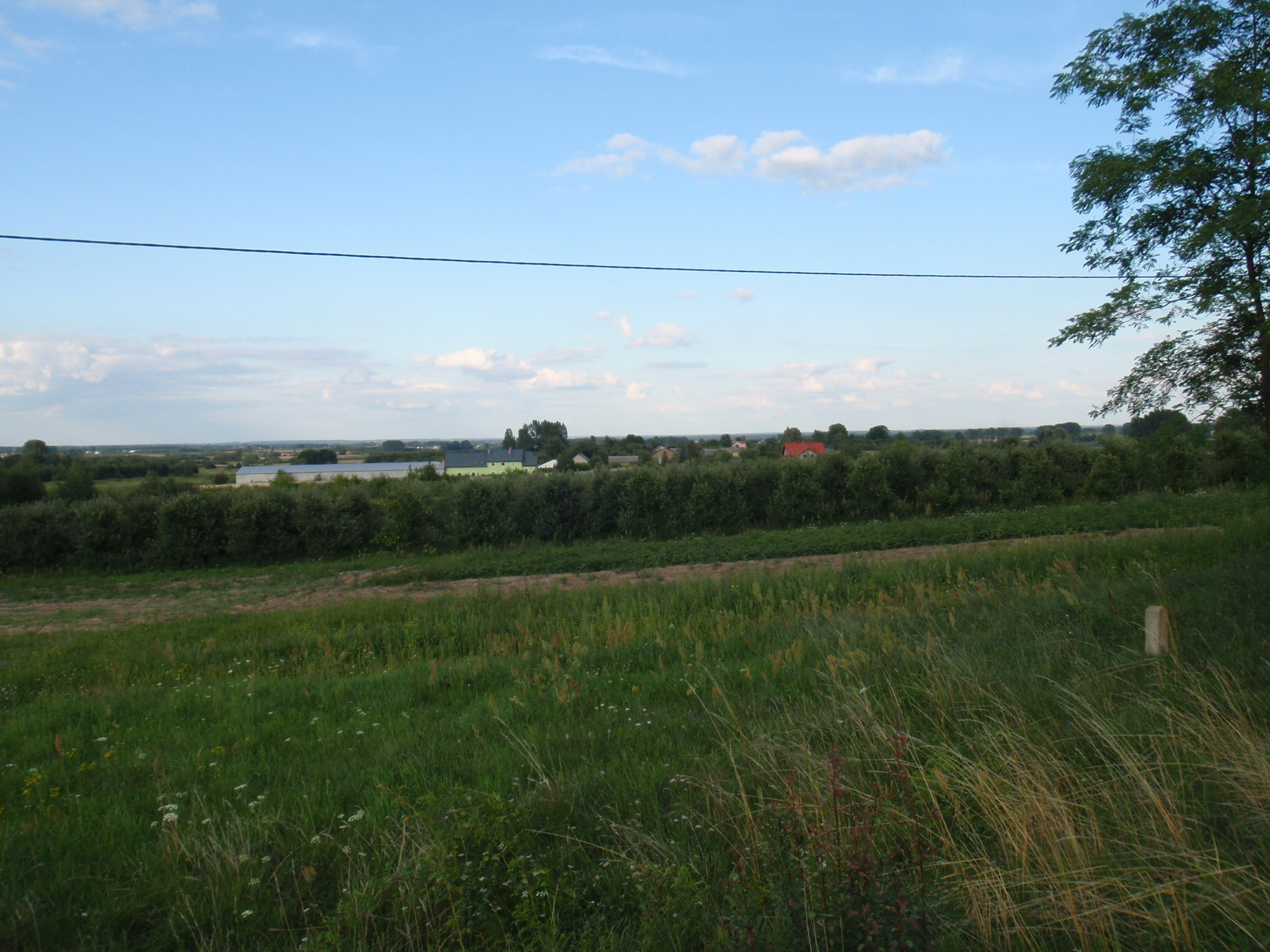
- Zdonków as seen from the Borkowice-Przysucha road

- Location within Poland
- Coordinates: 51°19′57″N 20°42′40″E
- Country: Poland
- Voivodeship: Masovian
- County: Przysucha
- Gmina: Borkowice

Zdonków [ˈzdɔŋkuf] is a village in the administrative district of Gmina Borkowice, within Przysucha County, Masovian Voivodeship, in east-central Poland.
