= Ruski Bród =

- Village
- Location within Poland
- Coordinates: 51°17′13″N 20°34′26″E
- Country: Poland
- Voivodeship: Masovian
- County: Przysucha
- Gmina: Przysucha

Ruski Bród [ˈruski ˈbrut] is a village in the administrative district of Gmina Przysucha, within Przysucha County, Masovian Voivodeship, in east-central Poland. Until the local government boundary changes of 1998/99 it was, for administrative purposes, included in the Radom Voivodeship.

== History ==
During World War II, many partisan groups operated in the vicinity of Ruski Bród . The soldiers of Major Hubal were active here, and later units of the Home Army, GL and NSZ . Between January 17 and 19, 1945, the biggest battle in the Kielce region was fought here (the so-called Kocioł pod Ruskim Brodem) . It is estimated that there were about 60,000 German soldiers in the Soviet cauldron and their allies. The fights in the village itself and on the edge of the forests lasted 2 days and 2 nights, during which Ruski Bród changed hands many times. The fight (often even with bayonets and shovels) was fought over individual yards and individual buildings.

The local 1000-year-old primary school is named after Hubalczyk and is a kind of monument to the branch, in the cemetery, the graves of those murdered on April 11, 1940, in retaliation for Hubal's actions, the inhabitants of the village. A monument dedicated to the soldiers of the Red Army and the Polish Army as well as partisans killed in 1939-45 was erected in the center of the village. Red Army soldiers were omitted in the new version of the plaque adopted on September 24, 2020, based on the recommendations of the Institute of National Remembrance.

The town is the seat of the Roman Catholic parish of St. Teresa. Parish Church of st. Teresa, from the Child Jesus comes from 1926.
