= Kamień Duży =

- Village
- Location within Poland
- Coordinates: 51°22′43″N 20°45′06″E
- Country: Poland
- Voivodeship: Masovian
- County: Przysucha
- Gmina: Wieniawa

Kamień Duży (Polish pronunciation: [ˈkamjɛj̃ ˈduʐɨ]) is a village in the administrative district of Gmina Wieniawa, within Przysucha County, Masovian Voivodeship, in east-central Poland.
