= Zielonka, Przysucha County =

Zielonka
- Village
- Location within Poland
- Coordinates: 51°23′31″N 20°31′42″E
- Country: Poland
- Voivodeship: Masovian
- County: Przysucha
- Gmina: Gielniów
- Population: 120

Zielonka [ʑɛˈlɔŋka] is a village in the administrative district of Gmina Gielniów, within Przysucha County, Masovian Voivodeship, in east-central Poland.
