= Podgóry =

Podgóry may refer to the following places:

- Podgóry, Masovian Voivodeship (east-central Poland)
- Podgóry, Puck County in Pomeranian Voivodeship (north Poland)
- Podgóry, Słupsk County in Pomeranian Voivodeship (north Poland)
