= Nieznamierowice =

- Village
- Location within Poland
- Coordinates: 51°28′N 20°34′E
- Country: Poland
- Voivodeship: Masovian
- County: Przysucha
- Gmina: Rusinów
- Population (approx.): 640
- Website: http://nieznamierowice.ovh.org/

Nieznamierowice [ɲɛznamjɛrɔˈvit͡sɛ] is a village in the administrative district of Gmina Rusinów, within Przysucha County, Masovian Voivodeship, in east-central Poland. The village used to be a town from the late 15th century to 1720.

The history of Nieznamierowice dates back to the early years of the Polish statehood, when on a small local hill stood a gord, protected by the Drzewiczka river. In 1028, Nieznamierowice became a royal village, upon order of King Mieszko II. Soon afterwards, it became the seat of the Znamierowski family, which named it Znamierowice. It is not known when Znamierowice was granted Magdeburg rights town charter, but it probably happened in the 15th century. Its name was changed to Nieznamierowice, and the newly established town became the seat of a St. Andrew Roman Catholic parish, which was transferred here in 1521 from Galki. A wooden church was built here, then another one (1760-1782), which burned in 1922. Current church was built from limestone in 1923–1933. Nieznamierowice lost its town charter in 1720 and has since been a village.
