= Drążno, Masovian Voivodeship =

Drążno
- Village
- Location within Poland
- Coordinates: 51°30′N 20°37′E
- Country: Poland
- Voivodeship: Masovian
- County: Przysucha
- Gmina: Klwów

Drążno [ˈdrɔ̃ʐnɔ] is a village in the administrative district of Gmina Klwów, within Przysucha County, Masovian Voivodeship, in east-central Poland.
