= Romualdów =

- Village
- Location within Poland
- Coordinates: 51°24′N 20°43′E
- Country: Poland
- Voivodeship: Masovian
- County: Przysucha
- Gmina: Wieniawa
- Time zone: UTC+1 (CET)
  - Summer (DST): UTC+2 (CEST)
- Vehicle registration: WPY
- Primary airport: Radom Airport

Romualdów [rɔmuˈalduf] is a village in the administrative district of Gmina Wieniawa, within Przysucha County, Masovian Voivodeship, in east-central Poland.

Romualdów was the location of a motte-and-bailey castle from the 13th-14th century, which is now an archaeological site.
