= Kotfin, Masovian Voivodeship =

Kotfin
- Village
- Location within Poland
- Coordinates: 51°21′18″N 20°26′14″E
- Country: Poland
- Voivodeship: Masovian
- County: Przysucha
- Gmina: Gielniów

Kotfin [ˈkɔtfin] is a village in the administrative district of Gmina Gielniów, within Przysucha County, Masovian Voivodeship, in east-central Poland.
