= Głogów (disambiguation) =

Głogów is a town in Lower Silesian Voivodeship, south-west Poland.

Głogów may also refer to:

- Głogów Małopolski, a town in Subcarpathian Voivodeship (south-east Poland)
- Głogów, Masovian Voivodeship (east-central Poland)
