= Kamień Mały, Masovian Voivodeship =

Kamień Mały
- Village
- Location within Poland
- Coordinates: 51°22′31″N 20°45′14″E
- Country: Poland
- Voivodeship: Masovian
- County: Przysucha
- Gmina: Wieniawa
- Population: 140

Kamień Mały (Polish pronunciation: [ˈkamjɛj̃ ˈmawɨ]) is a village in the administrative district of Gmina Wieniawa, within Przysucha County, Masovian Voivodeship, in east-central Poland.
