= Rdzuchów-Kolonia =

- Village
- Location within Poland
- Coordinates: 51°27′10″N 20°42′21″E
- Country: Poland
- Voivodeship: Masovian
- County: Przysucha
- Gmina: Potworów

Rdzuchów-Kolonia [ˈrd͡zuxuf kɔˈlɔɲa] is a village in the administrative district of Gmina Potworów, within Przysucha County, Masovian Voivodeship, in east-central Poland.
