= Grabowska Wola, Przysucha County =

Grabowska Wola
- Village
- Location within Poland
- Coordinates: 51°30′48″N 20°47′03″E
- Country: Poland
- Voivodeship: Masovian
- County: Przysucha
- Gmina: Potworów

Grabowska Wola [ɡraˈbɔfska ˈvɔla] is a village in the administrative district of Gmina Potworów, within Przysucha County, Masovian Voivodeship, in east-central Poland.
