= Bieliny, Przysucha County =

Bieliny
- Village
- Location within Poland
- Coordinates: 51°25′18″N 20°30′12″E
- Country: Poland
- Voivodeship: Masovian
- County: Przysucha
- Gmina: Gielniów

Bieliny [bjɛˈlinɨ] is a village in the administrative district of Gmina Gielniów, within Przysucha County, Masovian Voivodeship, in east-central Poland.
