= Ninków =

- Village
- Location within Poland
- Coordinates: 51°19′N 20°45′E
- Country: Poland
- Voivodeship: Masovian
- County: Przysucha
- Gmina: Borkowice

Ninków [ˈniŋkuf] is a village in the administrative district of Gmina Borkowice, within Przysucha County, Masovian Voivodeship, in east-central Poland.
