= Stoczki =

Stoczki may refer to the following places:

- Stoczki, Opoczno County in Łódź Voivodeship (central Poland)
- Stoczki, Pajęczno County in Łódź Voivodeship (central Poland)
- Stoczki, Podlaskie Voivodeship (north-east Poland)
- Stoczki, Sieradz County in Łódź Voivodeship (central Poland)
- Stoczki, Masovian Voivodeship (east-central Poland)
