= Brogowa =

- Village
- Location within Poland
- Coordinates: 51°26′N 20°40′E
- Country: Poland
- Voivodeship: Masovian
- County: Przysucha
- Gmina: Rusinów

Brogowa [brɔˈɡɔva] is a village in the administrative district of Gmina Rusinów, within Przysucha County, Masovian Voivodeship, in east-central Poland.
