= Drynia Stużańska =

- Village
- Location within Poland
- Coordinates: 51°22′12″N 20°26′8″E
- Country: Poland
- Voivodeship: Masovian
- County: Przysucha
- Gmina: Gielniów
- Population: 220

Drynia Stużańska [ˈdrɨɲa stuˈʐaɲska] is a village in the administrative district of Gmina Gielniów, within Przysucha County, Masovian Voivodeship, in east-central Poland.
