= Podczasza Wola =

- Village
- Location within Poland
- Coordinates: 51°32′N 20°40′E
- Country: Poland
- Voivodeship: Masovian
- County: Przysucha
- Gmina: Klwów

Podczasza Wola [pɔtˈt͡ʂaʂa ˈvɔla] is a village in the administrative district of Gmina Klwów, within Przysucha County, Masovian Voivodeship, in east-central Poland.
