= Kolonia Szczerbacka =

- Village
- Location within Poland
- Coordinates: 51°15′N 20°35′E
- Country: Poland
- Voivodeship: Masovian
- County: Przysucha
- Gmina: Przysucha

Kolonia Szczerbacka [kɔˈlɔɲa ʂt͡ʂɛrˈbat͡ska] is a village in the administrative district of Gmina Przysucha, within Przysucha County, Masovian Voivodeship, in east-central Poland.
