= Gałki, Gmina Rusinów =

Gałki
- Village
- Location within Poland
- Coordinates: 51°27′15″N 20°35′48″E
- Country: Poland
- Voivodeship: Masovian
- County: Przysucha
- Gmina: Rusinów

Gałki [ˈɡau̯ki] is a village in the administrative district of Gmina Rusinów, within Przysucha County, Masovian Voivodeship, in east-central Poland.
