= Brudnów, Masovian Voivodeship =

Brudnów
- Village
- Location within Poland
- Coordinates: 51°24′N 20°49′E
- Country: Poland
- Voivodeship: Masovian
- County: Przysucha
- Gmina: Wieniawa
- Population: 220

Brudnów [ˈbrudnuf] is a village in the administrative district of Gmina Wieniawa, within Przysucha County, Masovian Voivodeship, in east-central Poland.
