= Ulów, Masovian Voivodeship =

Ulów
- Village
- Location within Poland
- Coordinates: 51°34′6″N 20°40′54″E
- Country: Poland
- Voivodeship: Masovian
- County: Przysucha
- Gmina: Klwów
- Population: 380

Ulów [ˈuluf] is a village in the administrative district of Gmina Klwów, within Przysucha County, Masovian Voivodeship, in east-central Poland.
