= Grabowa, Gmina Rusinów =

Grabowa
- Village
- Location within Poland
- Coordinates: 51°25′52″N 20°33′39″E
- Country: Poland
- Voivodeship: Masovian
- County: Przysucha
- Gmina: Rusinów

Grabowa [ɡraˈbɔva] is a village in the administrative district of Gmina Rusinów, within Przysucha County, Masovian Voivodeship, in east-central Poland.
