= Rozwady, Masovian Voivodeship =

Rozwady
- Village
- Location within Poland
- Coordinates: 51°23′N 20°27′E
- Country: Poland
- Voivodeship: Masovian
- County: Przysucha
- Gmina: Gielniów

Rozwady [rɔzˈvadɨ] is a village in the administrative district of Gmina Gielniów, within Przysucha County, Masovian Voivodeship, in east-central Poland. Rozwady has a population of 165 residents
