= Karczówka, Przysucha County =

Karczówka
- Village
- Location within Poland
- Coordinates: 51°25′N 20°36′E
- Country: Poland
- Voivodeship: Masovian
- County: Przysucha
- Gmina: Rusinów

Karczówka [karˈt͡ʂufka] is a village in the administrative district of Gmina Rusinów, within Przysucha County, Masovian Voivodeship, in east-central Poland. The faithful of the Roman Catholic Church belong to the parish of the Visitation of the Blessed Virgin Mary in Smogorzow.
