= Zygmuntów, Przysucha County =

Zygmuntów
- Village
- Location within Poland
- Coordinates: 51°25′N 20°35′E
- Country: Poland
- Voivodeship: Masovian
- County: Przysucha
- Gmina: Gielniów
- Population: 150

Zygmuntów [zɨɡˈmuntuf] is a village in the administrative district of Gmina Gielniów, within Przysucha County, Masovian Voivodeship, in east-central Poland.
