= Przystałowice Duże-Kolonia =

- Village
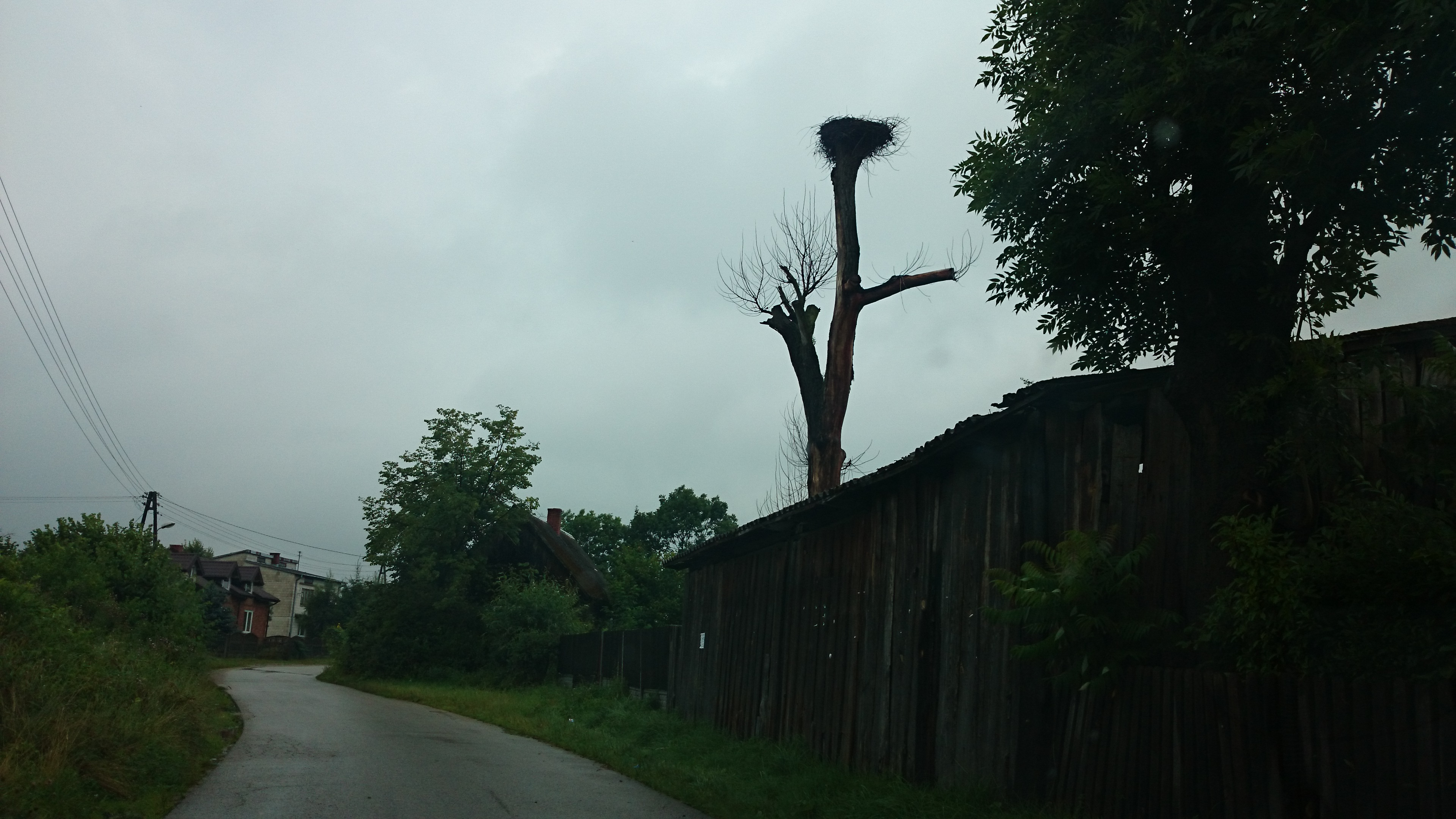
- Ciconia nest in Przystałowice Duże-Kolonia

- Location within Poland
- Coordinates: 51°28′38″N 20°40′25″E
- Country: Poland
- Voivodeship: Masovian
- County: Przysucha
- Gmina: Klwów

Przystałowice Duże-Kolonia [pʂɨstawɔˈvit͡sɛ ˈduʐɛ kɔˈlɔɲa] is a village in the administrative district of Gmina Klwów, within Przysucha County, Masovian Voivodeship, in east-central Poland.
