= Jabłonica, Masovian Voivodeship =

Jabłonica
- Village
- Location within Poland
- Coordinates: 51°21′22″N 20°48′5″E
- Country: Poland
- Voivodeship: Masovian
- County: Przysucha
- Gmina: Wieniawa

Jabłonica [jabwɔˈnit͡sa] is a village in the administrative district of Gmina Wieniawa, within Przysucha County, Masovian Voivodeship, in east-central Poland.
