= Gliniec, Masovian Voivodeship =

Gliniec
- Village
- Location within Poland
- Coordinates: 51°25′N 20°41′E
- Country: Poland
- Voivodeship: Masovian
- County: Przysucha
- Gmina: Przysucha

Gliniec [ˈɡliɲɛt͡s] is a village in the administrative district of Gmina Przysucha, within Przysucha County, Masovian Voivodeship, in east-central Poland.
