= Zawady, Przysucha County =

Zawady
- Village
- Location within Poland
- Coordinates: 51°20′59″N 20°49′42″E
- Country: Poland
- Voivodeship: Masovian
- County: Przysucha
- Gmina: Wieniawa

Zawady [zaˈvadɨ] is a village in the administrative district of Gmina Wieniawa, within Przysucha County, Masovian Voivodeship, in east-central Poland.
