= Zychorzyn =

- Village
- Location within Poland
- Coordinates: 51°27′N 20°32′E
- Country: Poland
- Voivodeship: Masovian
- County: Przysucha
- Gmina: Rusinów

Zychorzyn [zɨˈxɔʐɨn] is a village in the administrative district of Gmina Rusinów, within Przysucha County, Masovian Voivodeship, in east-central Poland.
