= Władysławów, Przysucha County =

Władysławów
- Village
- Location within Poland
- Coordinates: 51°25′N 20°34′E
- Country: Poland
- Voivodeship: Masovian
- County: Przysucha
- Gmina: Rusinów

Władysławów [vwadɨˈswavuf] is a village in the administrative district of Gmina Rusinów, within Przysucha County, Masovian Voivodeship, in east-central Poland.
