= Klonowa, Masovian Voivodeship =

Klonowa
- Village
- Location within Poland
- Coordinates: 51°25′N 20°38′E
- Country: Poland
- Voivodeship: Masovian
- County: Przysucha
- Gmina: Rusinów

Klonowa [klɔˈnɔva] is a village in the administrative district of Gmina Rusinów, within Przysucha County, Masovian Voivodeship, in east-central Poland.
