= Janów, Przysucha County =

Janów
- Village
- Location within Poland
- Coordinates: 51°18′54″N 20°36′46″E
- Country: Poland
- Voivodeship: Masovian
- County: Przysucha
- Gmina: Przysucha

Janów [ˈjanuf] is a village in the administrative district of Gmina Przysucha, within Przysucha County, Masovian Voivodeship, in east-central Poland.
