= Sokolniki Mokre =

- Village
- Location within Poland
- Coordinates: 51°22′N 20°46′E
- Country: Poland
- Voivodeship: Masovian
- County: Przysucha
- Gmina: Wieniawa

Sokolniki Mokre [sɔkɔlˈniki ˈmɔkrɛ] is a village in the administrative district of Gmina Wieniawa, within Przysucha County, Masovian Voivodeship, in east-central Poland.
