= Sady, Przysucha County =

Sady
- Village
- Location within Poland
- Coordinates: 51°27′N 20°41′E
- Country: Poland
- Voivodeship: Masovian
- County: Przysucha
- Gmina: Potworów

Sady [ˈsadɨ] is a village in the administrative district of Gmina Potworów, within Przysucha County, Masovian Voivodeship, in east-central Poland.
