= Zachatka =

- Settlement
- Location within Poland
- Coordinates: 51°32′01″N 20°43′48″E
- Country: Poland
- Voivodeship: Masovian
- County: Przysucha
- Gmina: Potworów

Zachatka [zaˈxatka] is a settlement in the administrative district of Gmina Potworów, within Przysucha County, Masovian Voivodeship, in east-central Poland.
