= Przystałowice Duże =

- Village
- Location within Poland
- Coordinates: 51°29′N 20°41′E
- Country: Poland
- Voivodeship: Masovian
- County: Przysucha
- Gmina: Klwów

Przystałowice Duże [pʂɨstawɔˈvit͡sɛ ˈduʐɛ] is a village in the administrative district of Gmina Klwów, within Przysucha County, Masovian Voivodeship, in east-central Poland.
