= Grabowa, Gmina Potworów =

Grabowa
- Village
- Location within Poland
- Coordinates: 51°25′58″N 20°33′39″E
- Country: Poland
- Voivodeship: Masovian
- County: Przysucha
- Gmina: Potworów

Grabowa [ɡraˈbɔva] is a village in the administrative district of Gmina Potworów, within Przysucha County, Masovian Voivodeship, in east-central Poland.
