= Skrzyńsko =

- Village
- Location within Poland
- Coordinates: 51°23′N 20°39′E
- Country: Poland
- Voivodeship: Masovian
- County: Przysucha
- Gmina: Przysucha
- Population: 1,200

Skrzyńsko [ˈskʂɨɲskɔ] is a village in the administrative district of Gmina Przysucha, within Przysucha County, Masovian Voivodeship, in east-central Poland.

The village is known for a legend about a giant spider that killed multiple priests before being defeated.
