= Kłudno, Gmina Klwów =

Kłudno
- Village
- Location within Poland
- Coordinates: 51°33′04″N 20°40′14″E
- Country: Poland
- Voivodeship: Masovian
- County: Przysucha
- Gmina: Klwów

Kłudno [ˈkwudnɔ] is a village in the administrative district of Gmina Klwów, within Przysucha County, Masovian Voivodeship, in east-central Poland.
