= Kozieniec, Masovian Voivodeship =

Kozieniec
- Village
- Location within Poland
- Coordinates: 51°32′N 20°42′E
- Country: Poland
- Voivodeship: Masovian
- County: Przysucha
- Gmina: Potworów

Kozieniec [kɔˈʑɛɲɛt͡s] is a village in the administrative district of Gmina Potworów, within Przysucha County, Masovian Voivodeship, in east-central Poland.
