= Ryków, Masovian Voivodeship =

Ryków
- Village
- Location within Poland
- Coordinates: 51°20′N 20°47′E
- Country: Poland
- Voivodeship: Masovian
- County: Przysucha
- Gmina: Wieniawa

Ryków [ˈrɨkuf] is a village in the administrative district of Gmina Wieniawa, within Przysucha County, Masovian Voivodeship, in east-central Poland.
