= Smogorzów, Masovian Voivodeship =

Smogorzów
- Village
- Location within Poland
- Coordinates: 51°23′22″N 20°36′32″E
- Country: Poland
- Voivodeship: Masovian
- County: Przysucha
- Gmina: Przysucha
- Population: 970

Smogorzów [smɔˈɡɔʐuf] is a village in the administrative district of Gmina Przysucha, within Przysucha County, Masovian Voivodeship, in east-central Poland.
