= Wola Kuraszowa =

- Village
- Location within Poland
- Coordinates: 51°18′N 20°43′E
- Country: Poland
- Voivodeship: Masovian
- County: Przysucha
- Gmina: Borkowice

Wola Kuraszowa [ˈvɔla kuraˈʂɔva] is a village in the administrative district of Gmina Borkowice, within Przysucha County, Masovian Voivodeship, in east-central Poland.
