= Jastrząb =

Jastrząb may refer to:

== Places ==
- Jastrząb, Przysucha County in Masovian Voivodeship (east-central Poland)
- Jastrząb, Szydłowiec County in Masovian Voivodeship (east-central Poland)
- Gmina Jastrząb, the administrative district centred on Jastrząb, Szydłowiec County
- Jastrząb, Silesian Voivodeship (south Poland)

== Other ==
- ORP Jastrząb, a World War II submarine of the Polish Navy
- Jastrząb, code name used for the Lockheed Martin F-16 fighter jet within the Polish Air Force.
