= Komorów, Przysucha County =

Komorów
- Village
- Location within Poland
- Coordinates: 51°22′50″N 20°44′9″E
- Country: Poland
- Voivodeship: Masovian
- County: Przysucha
- Gmina: Wieniawa

Komorów [kɔˈmɔruf] is a village in the administrative district of Gmina Wieniawa, within Przysucha County, Masovian Voivodeship, in east-central Poland.
