= Krajów, Masovian Voivodeship =

Krajów
- Village
- Location within Poland
- Coordinates: 51°24′N 20°43′E
- Country: Poland
- Voivodeship: Masovian
- County: Przysucha
- Gmina: Przysucha
- Population (approx.): 100

Krajów [ˈkrajuf] is a village in the administrative district of Gmina Przysucha, within Przysucha County, Masovian Voivodeship, in east-central Poland.
