= Janików, Przysucha County =

Janików
- Village
- Location within Poland
- Coordinates: 51°24′N 20°40′E
- Country: Poland
- Voivodeship: Masovian
- County: Przysucha
- Gmina: Przysucha

Janików [jaˈnikuf] is a village in the administrative district of Gmina Przysucha, within Przysucha County, Masovian Voivodeship, in east-central Poland.
