= Dąbrowa Goszczewicka =

Village in Gmina Potworów, Poland

- Village
- Location within Poland
- Coordinates: 51°26′43″N 20°46′05″E
- Country: Poland
- Voivodeship: Masovian
- County: Przysucha
- Gmina: Potworów

Dąbrowa Goszczewicka [dɔmˈbrɔva ɡɔʂt͡ʂɛˈvit͡ska] is a village in the administrative district of Gmina Potworów, within Przysucha County, Masovian Voivodeship, in east-central Poland.
