= Borowa Wola =

- Village
- Location within Poland
- Coordinates: 51°32′N 20°37′E
- Country: Poland
- Voivodeship: Masovian
- County: Przysucha
- Gmina: Klwów
- Population (approx.): 150

Borowa Wola [bɔˈrɔva ˈvɔla] is a village in the administrative district of Gmina Klwów, within Przysucha County, Masovian Voivodeship, in east-central Poland.
