= Wir Stary =

- Settlement
- Location within Poland
- Coordinates: 51°27′34″N 20°45′15″E
- Country: Poland
- Voivodeship: Masovian
- County: Przysucha
- Gmina: Potworów

Wir Stary [ˈvir ˈstarɨ] is a settlement in the administrative district of Gmina Potworów, within Przysucha County, Masovian Voivodeship, in east-central Poland.
