= Wrzos (disambiguation) =

Wrzos is a village in Radom County, Masovian Voivodeship, in east-central Poland.

Wrzos may also refer to:

- Wrzos (film), a 1938 Polish film
- Jerzy Wrzos (born 1936), Polish football manager
- Joseph Wrzos (1929-2023), American science fiction editor
