= Koryciska, Przysucha County =

Koryciska
- Village
- Location within Poland
- Coordinates: 51°21′N 20°50′E
- Country: Poland
- Voivodeship: Masovian
- County: Przysucha
- Gmina: Wieniawa
- Population (approx.): 300

Koryciska [kɔrɨˈt͡ɕiska] is a village in the administrative district of Gmina Wieniawa, within Przysucha County, Masovian Voivodeship, in east-central Poland.
