= Jamki, Masovian Voivodeship =

Jamki
- Village
- Location within Poland
- Coordinates: 51°26′23″N 20°44′12″E
- Country: Poland
- Voivodeship: Masovian
- County: Przysucha
- Gmina: Potworów
- Population: 40

Jamki [ˈjamki] is a village in the administrative district of Gmina Potworów, within Przysucha County, Masovian Voivodeship, in east-central Poland.

== Climate ==
Jamki, located in the Masovian Voivodeship of central Poland, experiences a humid continental climate with marked seasonal contrasts throughout the year. The climate is characterized by cold, snowy winters and warm, wetter summers, typical of central European inland regions. Average temperatures rise gradually from winter lows to summer highs: January records mean temperatures around −1 °C (29 °F), while July reaches mean temperatures of approximately 20 °C (68 °F). Precipitation occurs year‑round but peaks in summer, particularly in July when monthly rainfall is highest. Winters tend to be colder with temperatures often below freezing and moderate moisture, whereas summers are milder and wetter due to convective rainfall and occasional thunderstorms. Annual precipitation totals around 630 mm (24.9 inches).
