= Domaniów =

Domaniów may refer to the following places in Poland:

- Domaniów, Lower Silesian Voivodeship (south-west Poland)
- Domaniów, Masovian Voivodeship (east-central Poland)
