= Wola Gałecka =

- Village
- Location within Poland
- Coordinates: 51°28′N 20°35′E
- Country: Poland
- Voivodeship: Masovian
- County: Przysucha
- Gmina: Rusinów
- Elevation: 160 m (520 ft)
- Population: 310

Wola Gałecka [ˈvɔla ɡaˈwɛt͡ska] is a village in the administrative district of Gmina Rusinów, within Przysucha County, Masovian Voivodeship, in east-central Poland.
