= Mechlin, Masovian Voivodeship =

Mechlin
- Village
- Location within Poland
- Coordinates: 51°23′N 20°33′E
- Country: Poland
- Voivodeship: Masovian
- County: Przysucha
- Gmina: Gielniów

Mechlin [ˈmɛxlin] is a village in the administrative district of Gmina Gielniów, within Przysucha County, Masovian Voivodeship, in east-central Poland.
