= Pólka, Masovian Voivodeship =

Pólka
- Settlement
- Location within Poland
- Coordinates: 51°29′06″N 20°44′17″E
- Country: Poland
- Voivodeship: Masovian
- County: Przysucha
- Gmina: Potworów

Pólka [ˈpulka] is a settlement in the administrative district of Gmina Potworów, within Przysucha County, Masovian Voivodeship, in east-central Poland.
