= Żabia Wólka =

- Settlement
- Location within Poland
- Coordinates: 51°31′09″N 20°42′49″E
- Country: Poland
- Voivodeship: Masovian
- County: Przysucha
- Gmina: Potworów

Żabia Wólka [ˈʐabja ˈvulka] is a settlement in the administrative district of Gmina Potworów, within Przysucha County, Masovian Voivodeship, in east-central Poland.
