= Kacperków =

- Village
- Location within Poland
- Coordinates: 51°33′N 20°46′E
- Country: Poland
- Voivodeship: Masovian
- County: Przysucha
- Gmina: Potworów

Kacperków [kat͡sˈpɛrkuf] is a village in the administrative district of Gmina Potworów, within Przysucha County, Masovian Voivodeship, in east-central Poland.
