= Ulów-Kolonia =

- Village
- Location within Poland
- Coordinates: 51°34′35″N 20°39′44″E
- Country: Poland
- Voivodeship: Masovian
- County: Przysucha
- Gmina: Klwów
- Population: 160

Ulów-Kolonia [ˈuluf kɔˈlɔɲa] is a village in the administrative district of Gmina Klwów, within Przysucha County, Masovian Voivodeship, in east-central Poland.
