= Sołtysy, Masovian Voivodeship =

Sołtysy
- Village
- Location within Poland
- Coordinates: 51°20′36″N 20°26′55″E
- Country: Poland
- Voivodeship: Masovian
- County: Przysucha
- Gmina: Gielniów
- Population: 200

Sołtysy [sɔu̯ˈtɨsɨ] is a village in the administrative district of Gmina Gielniów, within Przysucha County, Masovian Voivodeship, in east-central Poland.
