= Sady-Kolonia =

- Village
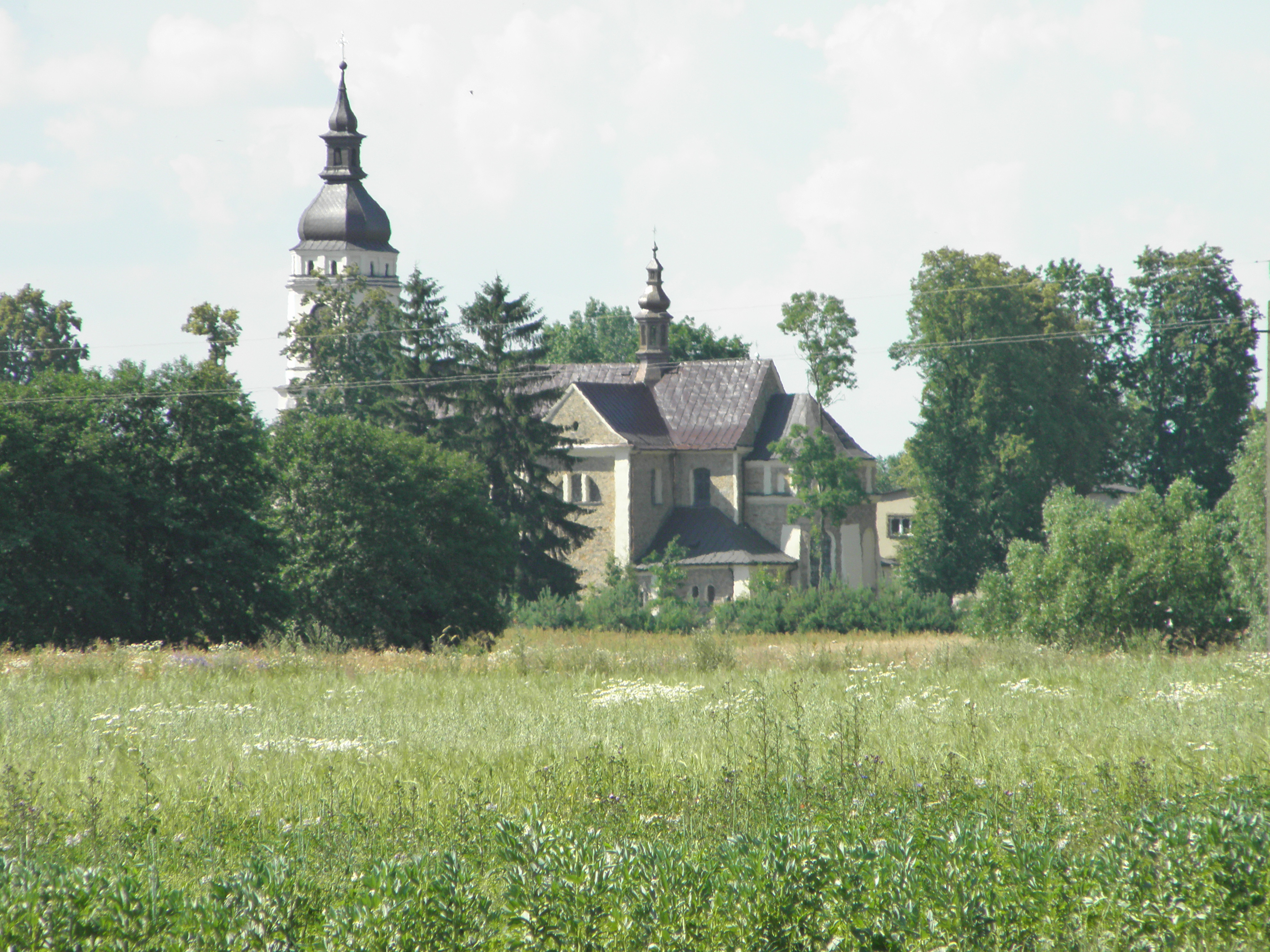
- Sacred Heart church in Sady-Kolonia

- Location within Poland
- Coordinates: 51°27′32″N 20°41′03″E
- Country: Poland
- Voivodeship: Masovian
- County: Przysucha
- Gmina: Klwów

Sady-Kolonia [ˈsadɨ kɔˈlɔɲa] is a village in the administrative district of Gmina Klwów, within Przysucha County, Masovian Voivodeship, in east-central Poland.
