= Żuków, Przysucha County =

Żuków
- Village
- Location within Poland
- Coordinates: 51°21′N 20°45′E
- Country: Poland
- Voivodeship: Masovian
- County: Przysucha
- Gmina: Wieniawa

Żuków [ˈʐukuf] is a village in the administrative district of Gmina Wieniawa, within Przysucha County, Masovian Voivodeship, in east-central Poland.
