= Huta, Przysucha County =

Huta
- Village
- Location within Poland
- Coordinates: 51°21′53″N 20°29′26″E
- Country: Poland
- Voivodeship: Masovian
- County: Przysucha
- Gmina: Gielniów
- Population: 120

Huta [ˈxuta] is a village in the administrative district of Gmina Gielniów, within Przysucha County, Masovian Voivodeship, in east-central Poland.
