= Kuźnica, Masovian Voivodeship =

Kuźnica
- Village
- Location within Poland
- Coordinates: 51°19′N 20°37′E
- Country: Poland
- Voivodeship: Masovian
- County: Przysucha
- Gmina: Przysucha

Kuźnica (Polish pronunciation: [kuʑˈɲit͡sa]) is a village in the administrative district of Gmina Przysucha, within Przysucha County, Masovian Voivodeship, in east-central Poland.
