= Wir, Masovian Voivodeship =

Wir
- Village
- Location within Poland
- Coordinates: 51°28′N 20°46′E
- Country: Poland
- Voivodeship: Masovian
- County: Przysucha
- Gmina: Potworów
- Population (approx.): 510

Wir [vir] is a village in the administrative district of Gmina Potworów, within Przysucha County, Masovian Voivodeship, in east-central Poland.
