= Mokrzec, Masovian Voivodeship =

Mokrzec
- Village
- Location within Poland
- Coordinates: 51°30′N 20°46′E
- Country: Poland
- Voivodeship: Masovian
- County: Przysucha
- Gmina: Potworów

Mokrzec [ˈmɔkʂɛt͡s] is a village in the administrative district of Gmina Potworów, within Przysucha County, Masovian Voivodeship, in east-central Poland.
