= Przystałowice Małe =

- Village
- Location within Poland
- Coordinates: 51°29′N 20°39′E
- Country: Poland
- Voivodeship: Masovian
- County: Przysucha
- Gmina: Rusinów
- Population: 310

Przystałowice Małe [pʂɨstawɔˈvit͡sɛ ˈmawɛ] is a village in the administrative district of Gmina Rusinów, within Przysucha County, Masovian Voivodeship, in east-central Poland.
