= Bryzgów =

- Village
- Location within Poland
- Coordinates: 51°17′N 20°40′E
- Country: Poland
- Voivodeship: Masovian
- County: Przysucha
- Gmina: Borkowice

Bryzgów [ˈbrɨzɡuf] is a village in the administrative district of Gmina Borkowice, within Przysucha County, Masovian Voivodeship, in east-central Poland.
