= Kłudno, Gmina Wieniawa =

Kłudno
- Village
- Location within Poland
- Coordinates: 51°22′12″N 20°49′08″E
- Country: Poland
- Voivodeship: Masovian
- County: Przysucha
- Gmina: Wieniawa

Kłudno [ˈkwudnɔ] is a village in the administrative district of Gmina Wieniawa, within Przysucha County, Masovian Voivodeship, in east-central Poland.
