= Niska Jabłonica =

Village in Gmina Borkowice, Poland

- Village
- Location within Poland
- Coordinates: 51°18′35″N 20°45′39″E
- Country: Poland
- Voivodeship: Masovian
- County: Przysucha
- Gmina: Borkowice

Niska Jabłonica [ˈniska jabwɔˈnit͡sa] is a village in the administrative district of Gmina Borkowice, within Przysucha County, Masovian Voivodeship, in east-central Poland.
