= Olszany, Przysucha County =

Olszany
- Settlement
- Location within Poland
- Coordinates: 51°30′51″N 20°44′17″E
- Country: Poland
- Voivodeship: Masovian
- County: Przysucha
- Gmina: Potworów

Olszany [ɔlˈʂanɨ] is a settlement in the administrative district of Gmina Potworów, within Przysucha County, Masovian Voivodeship, in east-central Poland.
