= Studzienice =

Studzienice may refer to the following places in Poland:

- Studzienice, Masovian Voivodeship (east-central Poland)
- Studzienice, Bytów County in Pomeranian Voivodeship (north Poland)
- Studzienice, Starogard County in Pomeranian Voivodeship (north Poland)
- Studzienice, Silesian Voivodeship (south Poland)
