= Łojków =

- Village
- Location within Poland
- Coordinates: 51°31′N 20°42′E
- Country: Poland
- Voivodeship: Masovian
- County: Przysucha
- Gmina: Potworów

Łojków [ˈwɔi̯kuf] is a village in the administrative district of Gmina Potworów, within Przysucha County, Masovian Voivodeship, in east-central Poland.
