= Krzesławice =

Krzesławice may refer to the following places in Poland:

- Krzesławice, Lesser Poland Voivodeship
- Krzesławice, Masovian Voivodeship
- Krzesławice, part of the Wzgórza Krzesławickie district of Kraków
