= Nowy Świat, Masovian Voivodeship =

Nowy Świat
- Village
- Location within Poland
- Coordinates: 51°31′N 20°36′E
- Country: Poland
- Voivodeship: Masovian
- County: Przysucha
- Gmina: Klwów

Nowy Świat (Polish pronunciation: [ˈnɔvɨ ˈɕfjat]) is a village in the administrative district of Gmina Klwów, within Przysucha County, Masovian Voivodeship, in east-central Poland.
