= Kolonia Zameczek =

- Settlement
- Location within Poland
- Coordinates: 51°28′45″N 20°56′09″E
- Country: Poland
- Voivodeship: Masovian
- County: Radom
- Gmina: Przytyk

Kolonia Zameczek [kɔˈlɔɲa zaˈmɛt͡ʂɛk] is a settlement in the administrative district of Gmina Przytyk, within Radom County, Masovian Voivodeship, in east-central Poland.
