= Jadwinów, Radom County =

Jadwinów
- Settlement
- Location within Poland
- Coordinates: 51°24′40″N 20°48′53″E
- Country: Poland
- Voivodeship: Masovian
- County: Radom
- Gmina: Przytyk

Jadwinów [jadˈvinuf] is a settlement in the administrative district of Gmina Przytyk, within Radom County, Masovian Voivodeship, in east-central Poland.
