= Głogów, Masovian Voivodeship =

Głogów
- Village
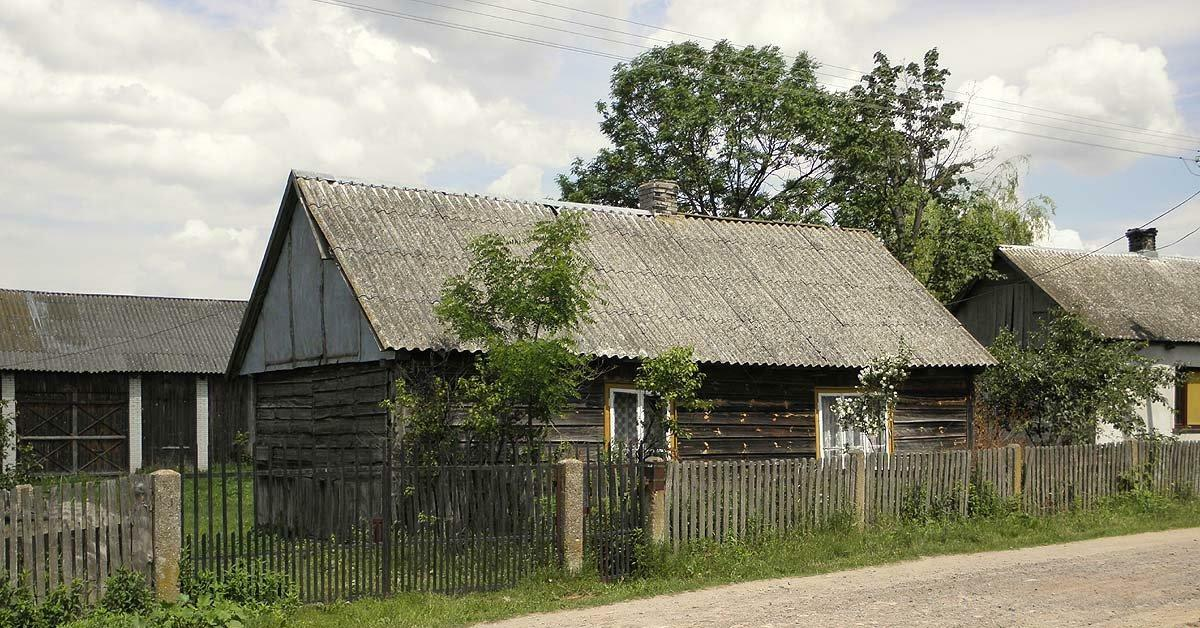

- Location within Poland
- Coordinates: 51°25′N 20°52′E
- Country: Poland
- Voivodeship: Masovian
- County: Przysucha
- Gmina: Wieniawa
- Time zone: UTC+1 (CET)
  - Summer (DST): UTC+2 (CEST)
- Vehicle registration: WPY

Głogów [ˈɡwɔɡuf] is a village in the administrative district of Gmina Wieniawa, within Przysucha County, Masovian Voivodeship, in east-central Poland.
