= Żmijków =

- Settlement
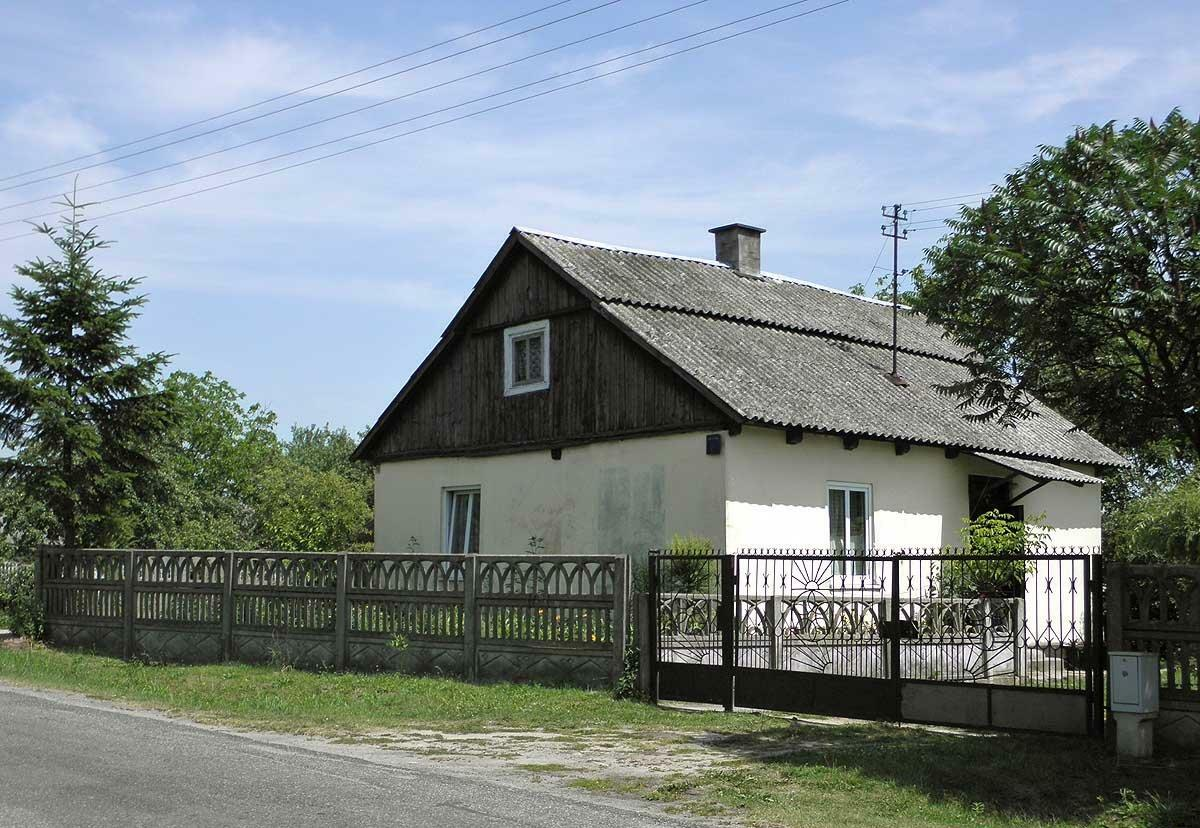

- Location within Poland
- Coordinates: 51°24′04″N 20°53′50″E
- Country: Poland
- Voivodeship: Masovian
- County: Radom
- Gmina: Przytyk

Żmijków [ˈʐmii̯kuf] is a settlement in the administrative district of Gmina Przytyk, within Radom County, Masovian Voivodeship, in east-central Poland.
