= Gmina Gielniów =

Gmina Gielniów Gielniów Commune
- Gmina
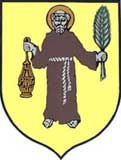
- Coat of arms
- Interactive map of Gmina Gielniów
- Coordinates (Gielniów): 51°23′N 20°29′E
- Country: Poland
- Voivodeship: Masovian
- County: Przysucha
- Seat: Gielniów

Area
  - Total: 79.17 km^{2} (30.57 sq mi)

Population (2006)
  - Total: 4,824
  - Density: 60.93/km^{2} (157.8/sq mi)
- Website: http://www.gielniow.radom.pl/

Gmina Gielniów is a rural gmina (administrative district) in Przysucha County, Masovian Voivodeship, in east-central Poland. Its seat is the village of Gielniów, which lies approximately 10 kilometres (6 mi) west of Przysucha and 100 km (62 mi) south of Warsaw.

The gmina covers an area of 79.17 square kilometres (30.6 sq mi), and as of 2006 its total population is 4,824.

== Villages ==
Gmina Gielniów contains the villages and settlements of Antoniów, Bieliny, Brzezinki, Drynia Stużańska, Gałki, Gielniów, Goździków, Huta, Jastrząb, Kotfin, Marysin, Mechlin, Rozwady, Snarki, Sołtysy, Stoczki, Wywóz, Zielonka and Zygmuntów.

== Neighbouring gminas ==
Gmina Gielniów is bordered by the gminas of Drzewica, Gowarczów, Opoczno, Przysucha and Rusinów.
