= Klwów =

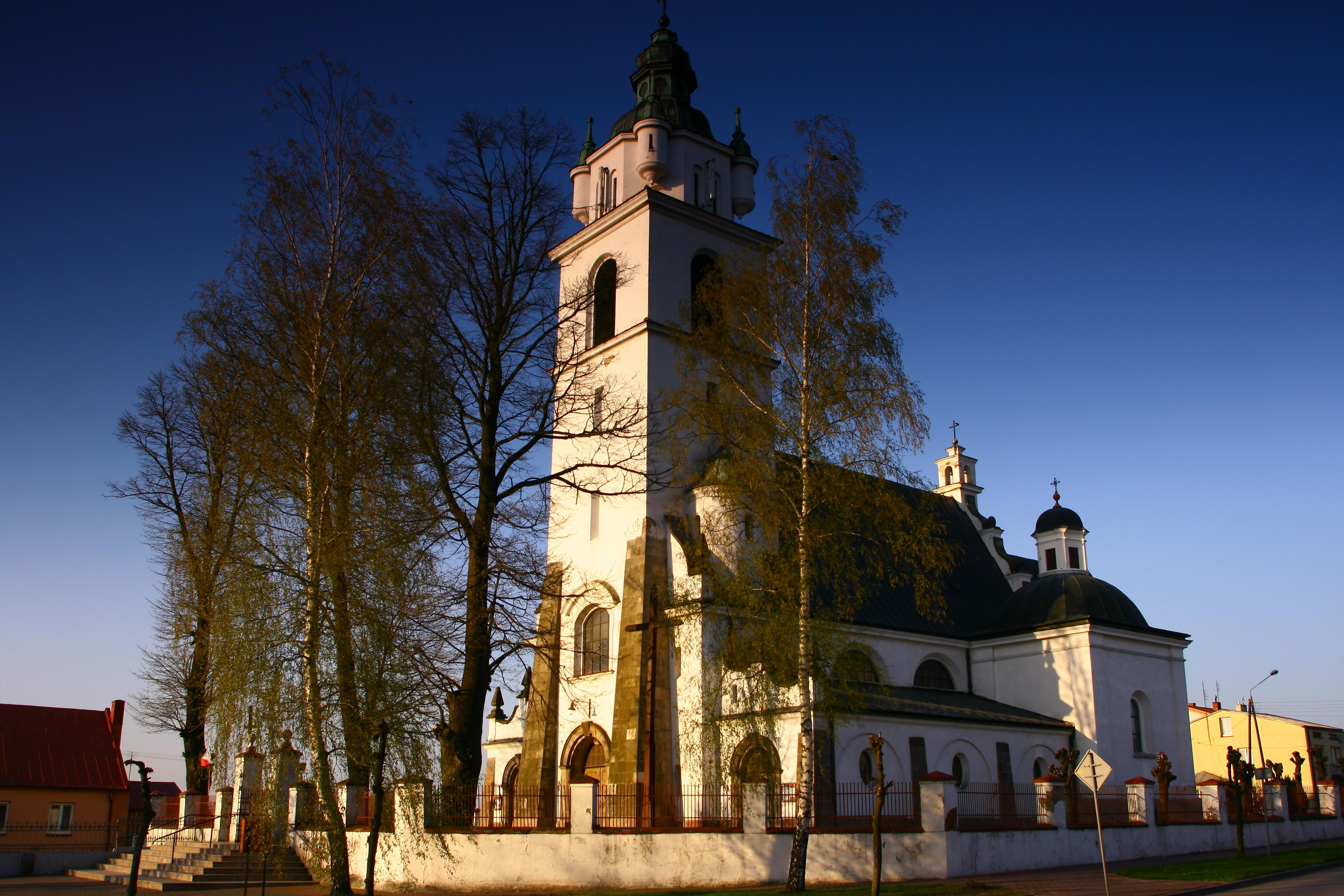
- Church of Saint Mathew in Klwów

- Coat of arms
- Motto(s): (It defies the storms); Semper invicta (Always invincible)
- Location within Poland
- Coordinates: 51°32′N 20°38′E
- Country: Poland
- Voivodeship: Masovian
- County: Przysucha
- Gmina: Klwów
- City Rights: 1413

Government
- Time zone: UTC+1 (CET)
  - Summer (DST): UTC+2 (CEST)
- Postal code: 26-415
- Area code: +48 48
- Car Plates: WPY

Klwów [klvuf] is a village in Przysucha County, Masovian Voivodeship, in east-central Poland. It is the seat of the gmina (administrative district) called Gmina Klwów.

Klwów is located in the southern part of the Masovian Plain, and its average altitude is 164 metres (540 ft) above sea level. It was granted town privileges in 1413 from King Jogaila, but lost that status after the January Uprising in 1863. According to a legend, its name probably comes from the city of Lwow, as Klwów was located on a merchant route towards this city ("ku Lwowu"). After receiving the town charter in 1413, King Jogaila allowed the residents of Klwów to organize weekly markets and two fairs a year. This privilege was confirmed by Kings Kazimierz Jagiellonczyk (1458), and Jan III Sobieski (1686).

In the Kingdom of Poland and the Polish–Lithuanian Commonwealth, Klwów belonged to Lesser Poland's Sandomierz Voivodeship. It remained a small town; in 1662 its population was approximately 370, living in 26 houses. After the Partitions of Poland it belonged to the Russian-controlled Congress Poland, and in 1827 had a population of 898. Klwów lost its town charter after the January Uprising (either in 1863 or 1867).

The village has ruins of a 13th-century castle, and a parish church built in 1491.
