= Rusinów, Gmina Rusinów =

Rusinów
- Village
- Location within Poland
- Coordinates: 51°26′N 20°34′E
- Country: Poland
- Voivodeship: Masovian
- County: Przysucha
- Gmina: Rusinów

Rusinów [ruˈɕinuf] is a village in Przysucha County, Masovian Voivodeship, in east-central Poland. It is the seat of the gmina (administrative district) called Gmina Rusinów.
