= Marysin, Gmina Gielniów =

Marysin
- Village
- Location within Poland
- Coordinates: 51°23′38″N 20°34′55″E
- Country: Poland
- Voivodeship: Masovian
- County: Przysucha
- Gmina: Gielniów

Marysin [maˈrɨɕin] is a village in the administrative district of Gmina Gielniów, within Przysucha County, Masovian Voivodeship, in east-central Poland.
