= Duży Las =

- Settlement
- Location within Poland
- Coordinates: 53°11′14″N 21°11′19″E
- Country: Poland
- Voivodeship: Masovian
- County: Radom
- Gmina: Przytyk

Duży Las [ˈduʐɨ ˈlas] is a settlement in the administrative district of Gmina Przytyk, within Radom County, Masovian Voivodeship, in southeastern Poland.
