= Kochanów, Przysucha County =

Kochanów
- Village
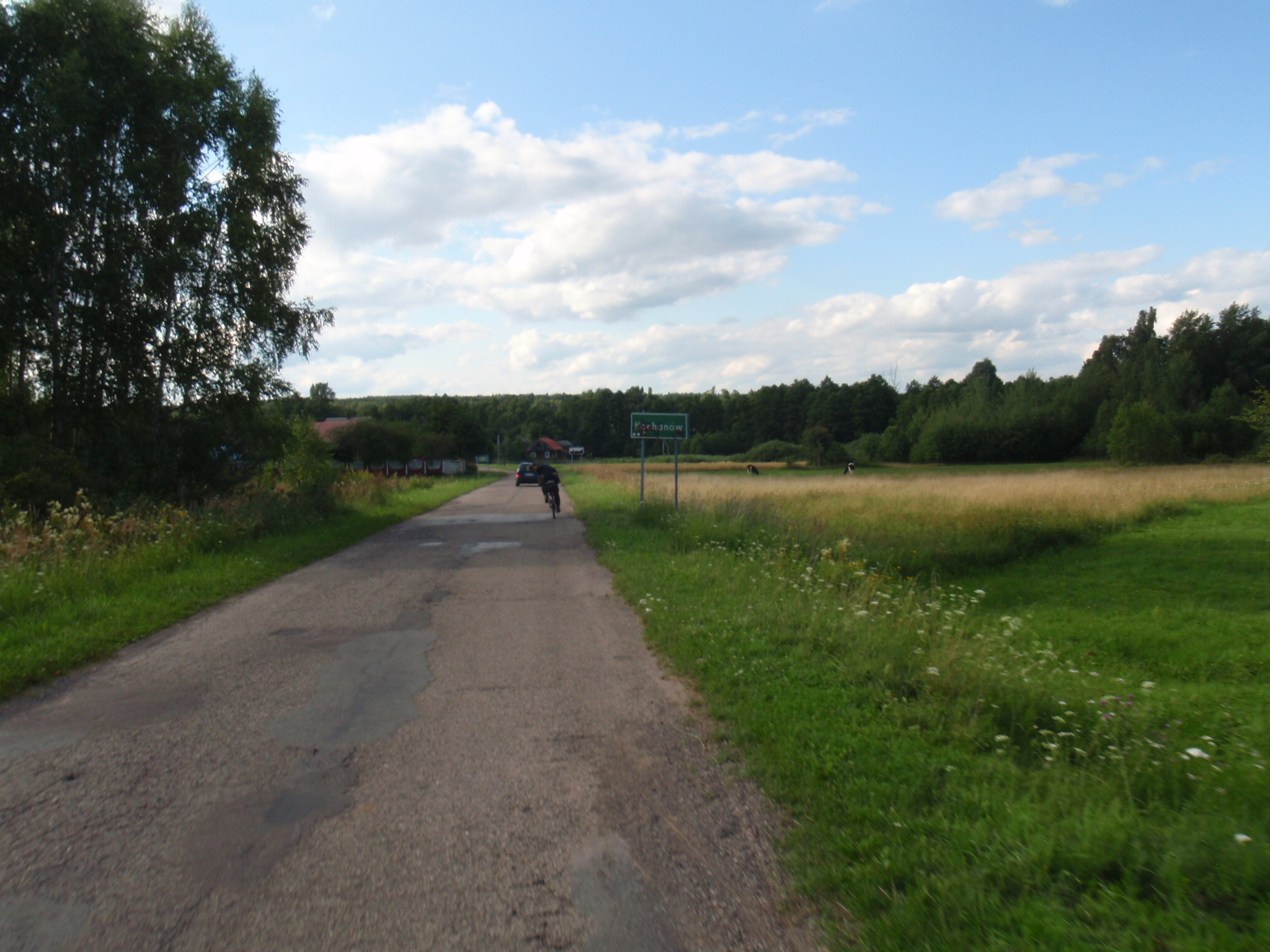
- Road sign in Kochanów

- Location within Poland
- Coordinates: 51°16′35″N 20°41′48″E
- Country: Poland
- Voivodeship: Masovian
- County: Przysucha
- Gmina: Borkowice

Kochanów [kɔˈxanuf] is a village in the administrative district of Gmina Borkowice, within Przysucha County, Masovian Voivodeship, in east-central Poland.
