= Oblas-Leśniczówka =

- Settlement
- Location within Poland
- Coordinates: 51°27′19″N 20°56′25″E
- Country: Poland
- Voivodeship: Masovian
- County: Radom
- Gmina: Przytyk

Oblas-Leśniczówka (Polish pronunciation: [ˈɔblas lɛɕɲiˈtʂufka]) is a settlement in the administrative district of Gmina Przytyk, within Radom County, Masovian Voivodeship, in east-central Poland.
