= Wieniawski =

Wieniawski is a surname. Notable people with the surname include:

- Henryk Wieniawski (1835–1880), Polish violinist and composer
- Régine Wieniawski (1879–1932), known as Poldowski, composer and pianist, daughter of Henryk
- Józef Wieniawski (1837–1912), Polish pianist, composer, conductor and teacher, brother of Henryk

== See also ==
- Kochanów Wieniawski, a village in Masovian Voivodeship, Poland
