= Kochanów =

Kochanów may refer to the following places in Poland:

- Kochanów, Lower Silesian Voivodeship (south-west Poland)
- Kochanów, Skierniewice County in Łódź Voivodeship (central Poland)
- Kochanów, Gmina Lubochnia, Tomaszów County in Łódź Voivodeship (central Poland)
- Kochanów, Lublin Voivodeship (east Poland)
- Kochanów, Lesser Poland Voivodeship (south Poland)
- Kochanów, Lipsko County in Masovian Voivodeship (east-central Poland)
- Kochanów, Przysucha County in Masovian Voivodeship (east-central Poland)
