= Stoczki, Masovian Voivodeship =

Stoczki
- Village
- Location within Poland
- Coordinates: 51°24′N 20°33′E
- Country: Poland
- Voivodeship: Masovian
- County: Przysucha
- Gmina: Gielniów

Stoczki [ˈstɔt͡ʂki] is a village in the administrative district of Gmina Gielniów, within Przysucha County, Masovian Voivodeship, in east-central Poland.
