= Marysin, Gmina Potworów =

Marysin
- Village
- Location within Poland
- Coordinates: 51°27′53″N 20°46′32″E
- Country: Poland
- Voivodeship: Masovian
- County: Przysucha
- Gmina: Potworów

Marysin [maˈrɨɕin] is a village in the administrative district of Gmina Potworów, within Przysucha County, Masovian Voivodeship, in east-central Poland.
