= Ostrołęka, Radom County =

Ostrołęka
- Village
- Location within Poland
- Coordinates: 51°26′30″N 20°47′15″E
- Country: Poland
- Voivodeship: Masovian
- County: Radom
- Gmina: Przytyk
- Population: 203

Ostrołęka [ɔstrɔˈwɛŋka] is a village in the administrative district of Gmina Przytyk, within Radom County, Masovian Voivodeship, in east-central Poland.
