= Stefanów, Radom County =

Stefanów
- Village
- Location within Poland
- Coordinates: 51°28′N 20°58′E
- Country: Poland
- Voivodeship: Masovian
- County: Radom
- Gmina: Przytyk
- Time zone: UTC+1 (CET)
  - Summer (DST): UTC+2 (CEST)

Stefanów [stɛˈfanuf] is a village in the administrative district of Gmina Przytyk, within Radom County, Masovian Voivodeship, in east-central Poland.

Six Polish citizens were murdered by Nazi Germany in the village during World War II.
