= Krzyszkowice, Masovian Voivodeship =

Krzyszkowice
- Village
- Location within Poland
- Coordinates: 51°24′50″N 20°54′05″E
- Country: Poland
- Voivodeship: Masovian
- County: Radom
- Gmina: Przytyk

Krzyszkowice [kʂɨʂkɔˈvit͡sɛ] is a village in the administrative district of Gmina Przytyk, within Radom County, Masovian Voivodeship, in east-central Poland.
