= Potworów, Masovian Voivodeship =

Potworów
- Village
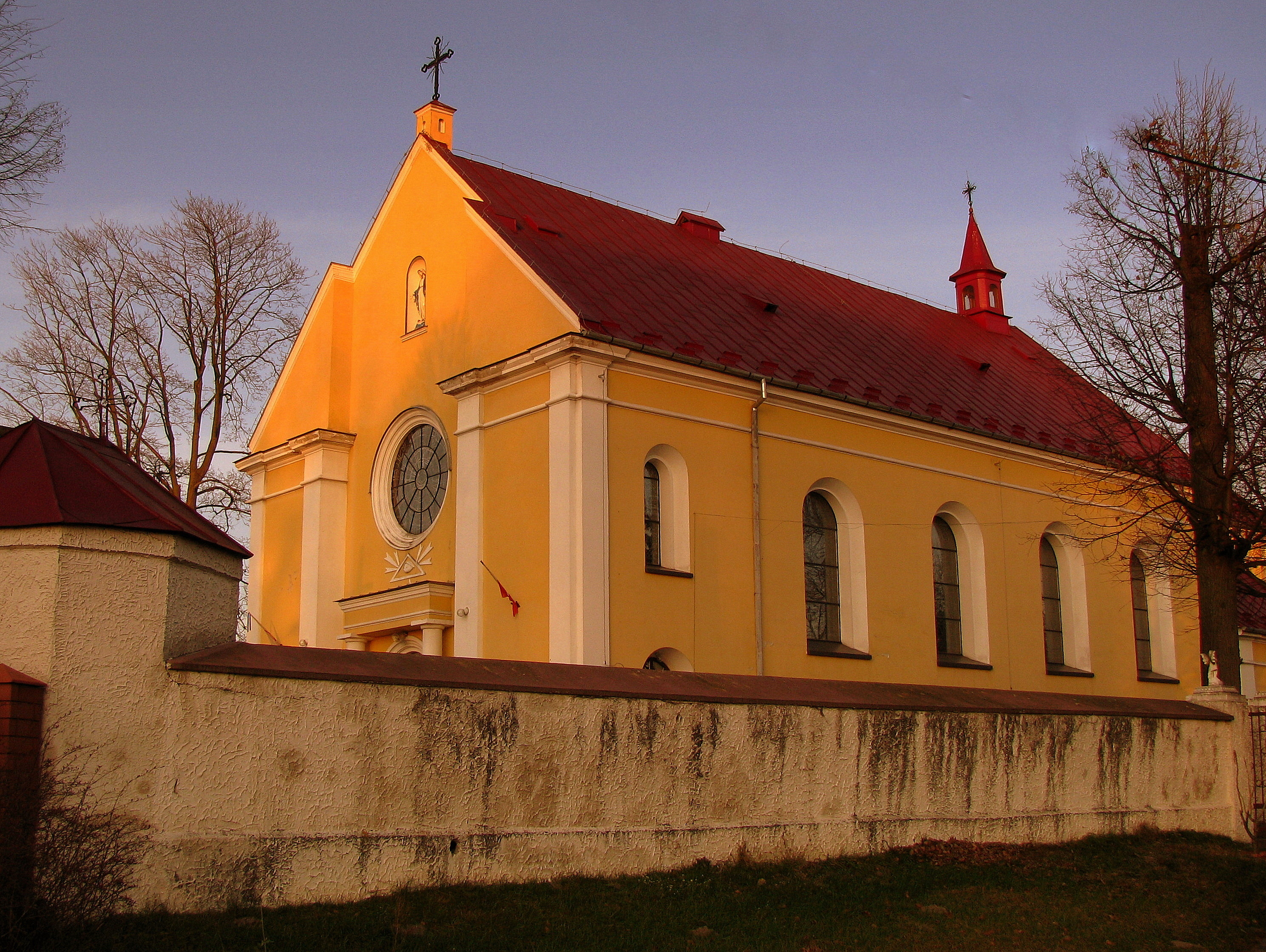
- Saint Dorothy church in Potworów

- Coat of arms

- Location within Poland
- Coordinates: 51°31′N 20°43′E
- Country: Poland
- Voivodeship: Masovian
- County: Przysucha
- Gmina: Potworów

Population
  - Total: 990
- Time zone: UTC+1 (CET)
  - Summer (DST): UTC+2 (CEST)
- Vehicle registration: WPY
- Website: http://www.potworow.pl

Potworów [pɔtˈfɔruf] is a village in Przysucha County, Masovian Voivodeship, in east-central Poland. It is the seat of the gmina (administrative district) called Gmina Potworów.

== History ==
The local Catholic church and parish were founded before the 15th century. Potworów was a private village of the Potkański family, administratively located in the Sandomierz Voivodeship in the Lesser Poland Province of the Kingdom of Poland. As of 1827, it had a population of 341.

Following the German-Soviet invasion of Poland, which started World War II in September 1939, the village was occupied by Germany until 1945. Three local Polish policemen, including the police chief, were murdered by the Russians in the Katyn massacre in 1940.

== Transport ==
Potworów lies on the intersection of national road 48 with voivodeship roads 740 and 729.

The nearest railway station is in Przysucha.
