= Witoldów, Radom County =

Witoldów
- Village
- Location within Poland
- Coordinates: 51°30′49″N 20°50′46″E
- Country: Poland
- Voivodeship: Masovian
- County: Radom
- Gmina: Przytyk

Witoldów (Polish pronunciation: [viˈtɔlduf]) is a village in the administrative district of Gmina Przytyk, within Radom County, Masovian Voivodeship, in east-central Poland.
