= Młódnice =

- Village
- Location within Poland
- Coordinates: 51°25′N 20°51′E
- Country: Poland
- Voivodeship: Masovian
- County: Radom
- Gmina: Przytyk
- Population: 136
- Website: mlodnice.pl

Młódnice [mwudˈnit͡sɛ] is a village in the administrative district of Gmina Przytyk, within Radom County, Masovian Voivodeship, in east-central Poland.
