= Gmina Borkowice =

Gmina Borkowice Borkowice Commune
- Gmina
- Coat of arms
- Interactive map of Gmina Borkowice
- Coordinates (Borkowice): 51°19′16″N 20°40′53″E
- Country: Poland
- Voivodeship: Masovian
- County: Przysucha
- Seat: Borkowice

Area
  - Total: 86.06 km^{2} (33.23 sq mi)

Population (2006)
  - Total: 4,634
  - Density: 53.85/km^{2} (139.5/sq mi)
- Website: http://www.borkowice.ug.net.pl/

Gmina Borkowice is a rural gmina (administrative district) in Przysucha County, Masovian Voivodeship, in east-central Poland. Its seat is the village of Borkowice, which lies approximately 7 kilometres (4 mi) south-east of Przysucha and 102 km (63 mi) south of Warsaw.

The gmina covers an area of 86.06 square kilometres (33.2 sq mi), and as of 2006 its total population is 4,634.

== Villages ==
Gmina Borkowice contains the villages and settlements of Bolęcin, Borkowice, Bryzgów, Kochanów, Ninków, Niska Jabłonica, Politów, Radestów, Rudno, Ruszkowice, Rzuców, Smagów, Wola Kuraszowa, Wymysłów and Zdonków.

== Neighbouring gminas ==
Gmina Borkowice is bordered by the gminas of Chlewiska, Przysucha and Wieniawa.
