= Wrzeszczów =

- Village
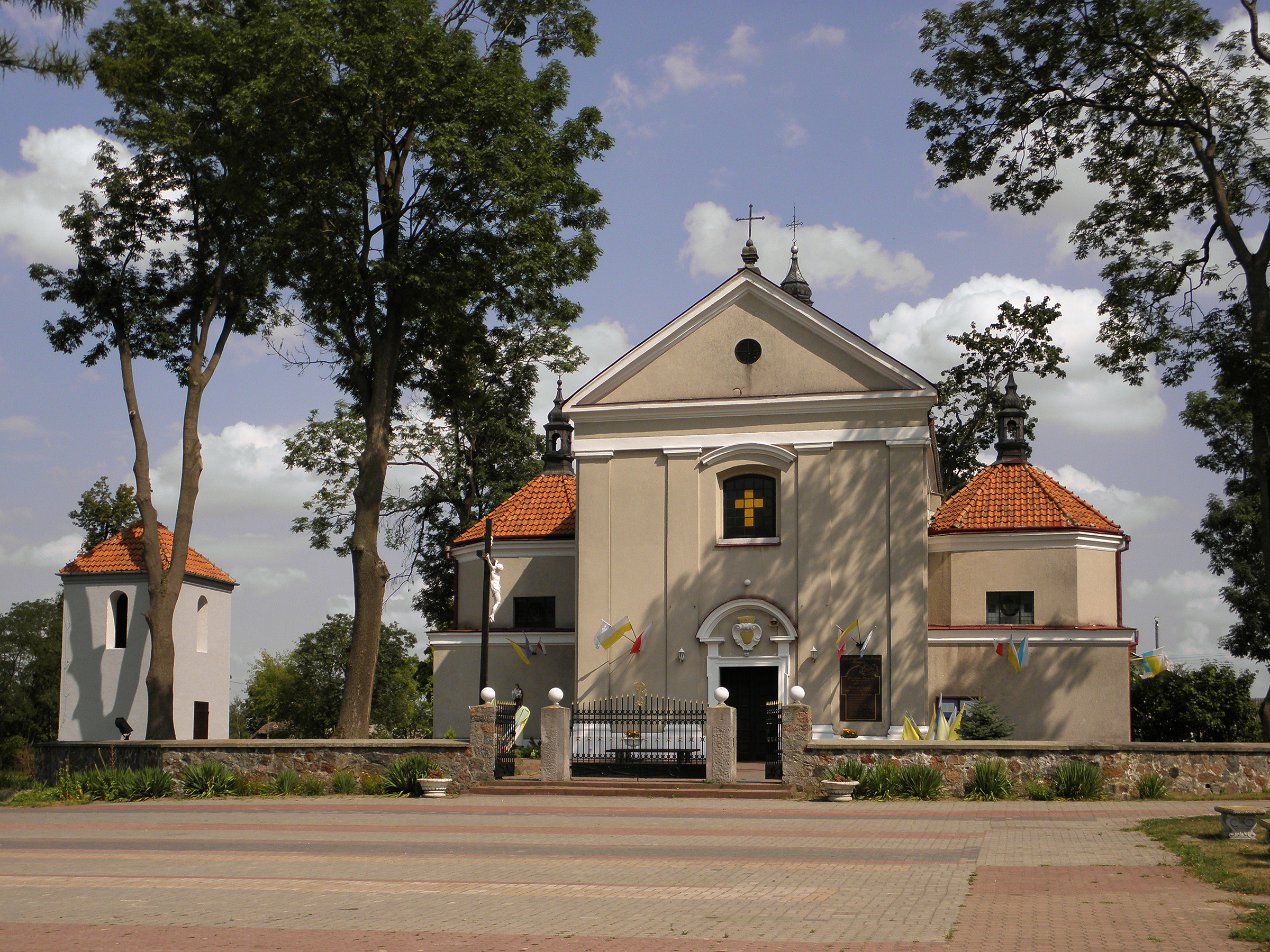
- Church of Saint Mary Magdalene

- Location within Poland
- Coordinates: 51°30′N 20°50′E
- Country: Poland
- Voivodeship: Masovian
- County: Radom
- Gmina: Przytyk

Wrzeszczów [ˈvʐɛʂt͡ʂuf] is a village in the administrative district of Gmina Przytyk, within Radom County, Masovian Voivodeship, in east-central Poland.
