= Jastrząb, Przysucha County =

Jastrząb
- Village
- Location within Poland
- Coordinates: 51°25′N 20°31′E
- Country: Poland
- Voivodeship: Masovian
- County: Przysucha
- Gmina: Gielniów
- Time zone: UTC+1 (CET)
  - Summer (DST): UTC+2 (CEST)

Jastrząb [ˈjastʂɔmp] is a village in the administrative district of Gmina Gielniów, within Przysucha County, Masovian Voivodeship, in east-central Poland.

Nine Polish citizens were murdered by Nazi Germany in the village during World War II.
