= Stary Młyn, Masovian Voivodeship =

Stary Młyn
- Settlement
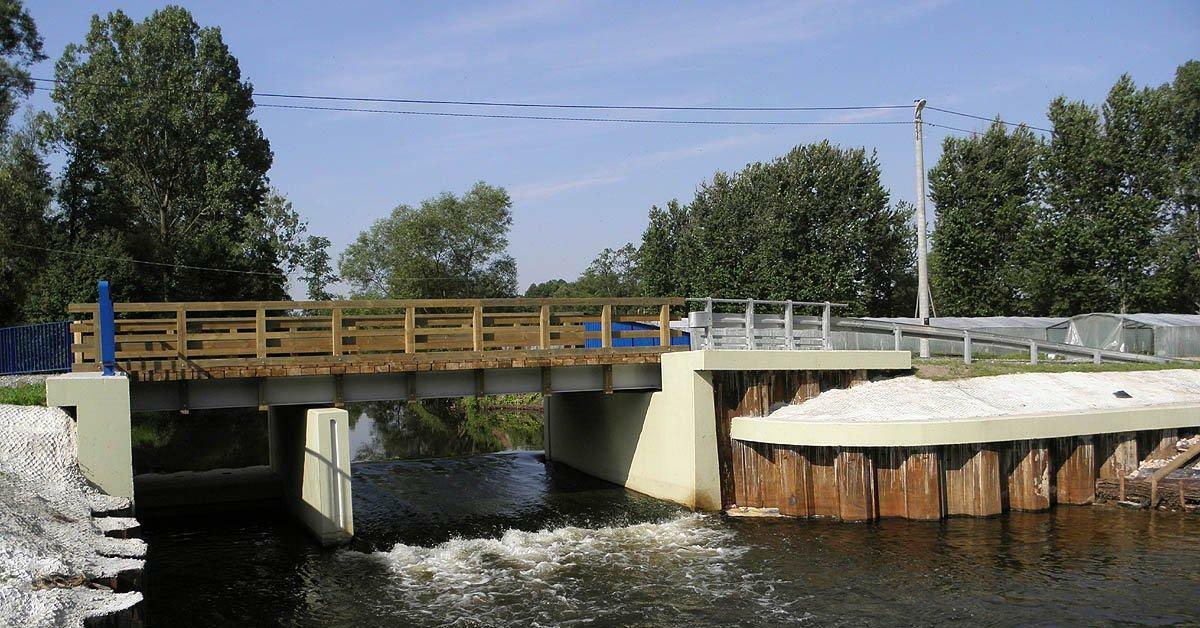

- Location within Poland
- Coordinates: 51°26′17″N 20°52′40″E
- Country: Poland
- Voivodeship: Masovian
- County: Radom
- Gmina: Przytyk

Stary Młyn [ˈstarɨ ˈmwɨn] is a settlement in the administrative district of Gmina Przytyk, within Radom County, Masovian Voivodeship, in east-central Poland.
