= Gmina Klwów =

Gmina Klwów Klwów Commune
- Gmina
- Coat of arms
- Interactive map of Gmina Klwów
- Coordinates (Klwów): 51°32′N 20°38′E
- Country: Poland
- Voivodeship: Masovian
- County: Przysucha
- Seat: Klwów

Area
  - Total: 90.46 km^{2} (34.93 sq mi)

Population (2006)
  - Total: 3,470
  - Density: 38.4/km^{2} (99.4/sq mi)

Gmina Klwów is a rural gmina (administrative district) in Przysucha County, Masovian Voivodeship, in east-central Poland. Its seat is the village of Klwów, which lies approximately 19 kilometres (12 mi) north of Przysucha and 80 km (50 mi) south of Warsaw.

The gmina covers an area of 90.46 square kilometres (34.9 sq mi), and as of 2006 its total population is 3,470.

== Villages ==
Gmina Klwów contains the villages and settlements of Borowa Wola, Brzeski, Drążno, Głuszyna, Kadź, Kłudno, Klwów, Ligęzów, Nowy Świat, Podczasza Wola, Przystałowice Duże, Przystałowice Duże-Kolonia, Sady-Kolonia, Sulgostów, Ulów and Ulów-Kolonia.

== Neighbouring gminas ==
Gmina Klwów is bordered by the gminas of Nowe Miasto nad Pilicą, Odrzywół, Potworów, Rusinów and Wyśmierzyce.
