= Wymysłów, Gmina Potworów =

Wymysłów
- Settlement
- Location within Poland
- Coordinates: 51°30′22″N 20°45′02″E
- Country: Poland
- Voivodeship: Masovian
- County: Przysucha
- Gmina: Potworów

Wymysłów [vɨˈmɨswuf] is a settlement in the administrative district of Gmina Potworów, within Przysucha County, Masovian Voivodeship, in east-central Poland.
