= Gmina Przytyk =

Gmina Przytyk Przytyk Commune
- Gmina
- Flag Coat of arms
- Interactive map of Gmina Przytyk
- Coordinates (Przytyk): 51°28′N 20°54′E
- Country: Poland
- Voivodeship: Masovian
- County: Radom County
- Seat: Przytyk

Area
  - Total: 134.12 km^{2} (51.78 sq mi)

Population (2006)
  - Total: 7,067
  - Density: 52.69/km^{2} (136.5/sq mi)
- Website: http://www.przytyk.pl/

Gmina Przytyk is a rural gmina (administrative district) in Radom County, Masovian Voivodeship, in east-central Poland. Its seat is the village of Przytyk, which lies approximately 20 kilometres (12 mi) west of Radom and 84 km (52 mi) south of Warsaw.

The gmina covers an area of 134.12 square kilometres (51.8 sq mi), and as of 2006 its total population is 7,067.

== Villages ==
Gmina Przytyk contains the villages and settlements of Dęba, Domaniów, Duży Las, Gaczkowice, Glinice, Goszczewice, Jabłonna, Jadwinów, Jagodno, Kaszewska Wola, Kolonia Zameczek, Krzyszkowice, Maksymilianów, Młódnice, Mścichów, Oblas, Oblas-Leśniczówka, Ostrołęka, Podgajek, Posada, Potkanna, Przytyk, Sewerynów, Słowików, Stary Młyn, Stefanów, Studzienice, Suków, Sukowska Wola, Witoldów, Wola Wrzeszczowska, Wólka Domaniowska, Wrzeszczów, Wrzos, Wygnanów, Zameczek, Żerdź and Żmijków.

== Neighbouring gminas ==
Gmina Przytyk is bordered by the gminas of Potworów, Przysucha, Radzanów, Stara Błotnica, Wieniawa, Wolanów and Zakrzew.
