= Słowików, Masovian Voivodeship =

Village in Gmina Przytyk, Poland

Słowików
- Village
- Location within Poland
- Coordinates: 51°27′22″N 20°52′51″E
- Country: Poland
- Voivodeship: Masovian
- County: Radom
- Gmina: Przytyk

Słowików [swɔˈvikuf] is a village in the administrative district of Gmina Przytyk, within Radom County, Masovian Voivodeship, in east-central Poland.
