= Zameczek, Masovian Voivodeship =

Zameczek
- Village
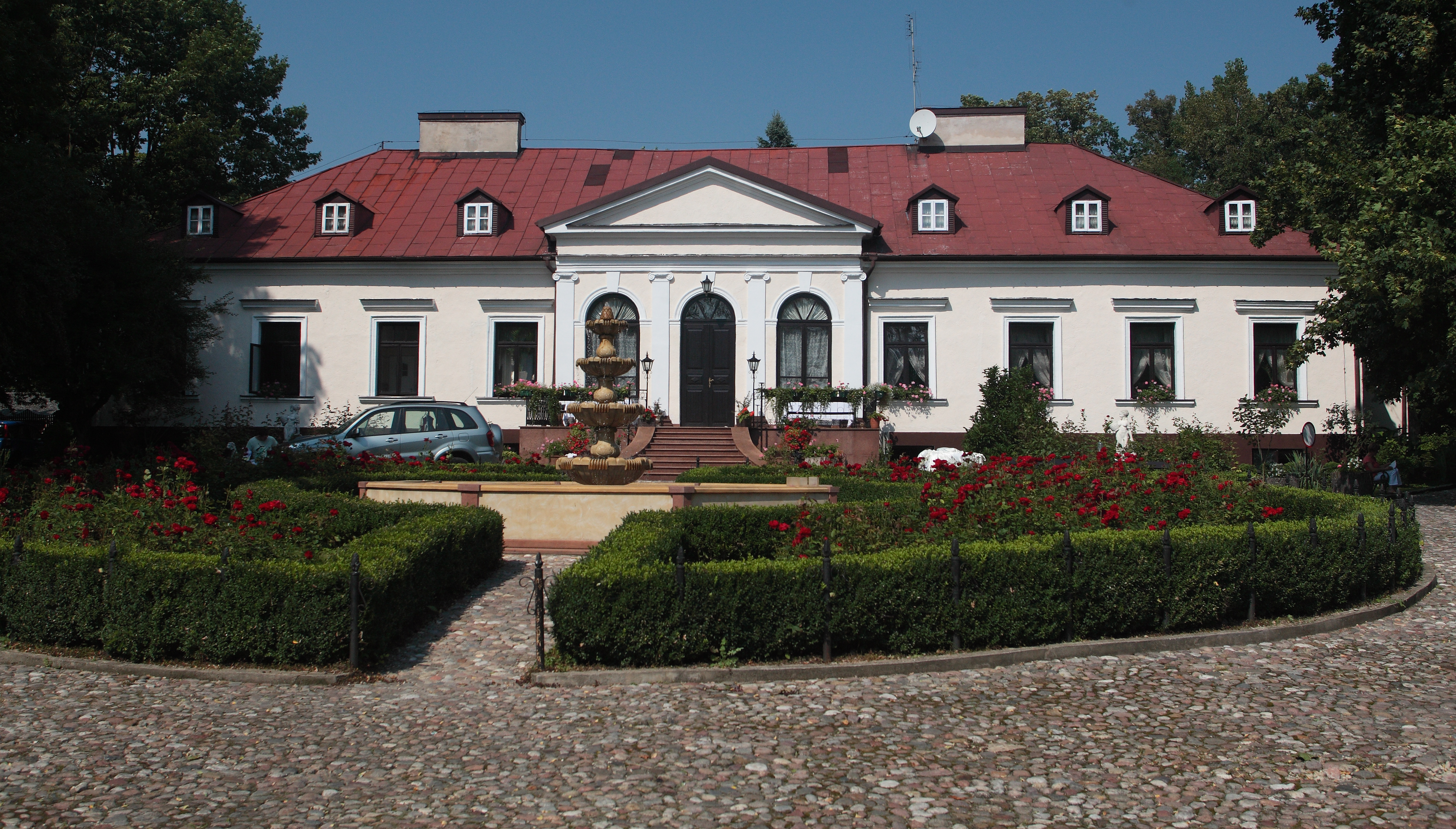
- Manor in Zameczek

- Location within Poland
- Coordinates: 51°28′40″N 20°55′29″E
- Country: Poland
- Voivodeship: Masovian
- County: Radom
- Gmina: Przytyk

Zameczek [zaˈmɛt͡ʂɛk] is a village in the administrative district of Gmina Przytyk, within Radom County, Masovian Voivodeship, in east-central Poland.
