= Gmina Rusinów =

Gmina Rusinów Rusinów Commune
- Gmina
- Coat of arms
- Interactive map of Gmina Rusinów
- Coordinates (Rusinów): 51°26′N 20°34′E
- Country: Poland
- Voivodeship: Masovian
- County: Przysucha
- Seat: Rusinów

Area
  - Total: 82.93 km^{2} (32.02 sq mi)

Population (2006)
  - Total: 4,462
  - Density: 53.80/km^{2} (139.4/sq mi)
- Website: http://www.rusinow.pl

Gmina Rusinów is a rural gmina (administrative district) in Przysucha County, Masovian Voivodeship, in east-central Poland. Its seat is the village of Rusinów, which lies approximately 9 kilometres (6 mi) north-west of Przysucha and 92 km (57 mi) south of Warsaw.

The gmina covers an area of 82.93 square kilometres (32.0 sq mi), and as of 2006 its total population is 4,462.

== Villages ==
Gmina Rusinów contains the villages and settlements of Bąków, Bąków-Kolonia, Brogowa, Gałki, Grabowa, Karczówka, Klonowa, Krzesławice, Nieznamierowice, Przystałowice Małe, Rusinów, Władysławów, Wola Gałecka and Zychorzyn.

== Neighbouring gminas ==
Gmina Rusinów is bordered by the gminas of Drzewica, Gielniów, Klwów, Odrzywół, Potworów and Przysucha.
