= Maksymilianów, Radom County =

Maksymilianów
- Village
- Location within Poland
- Coordinates: 51°31′N 20°54′E
- Country: Poland
- Voivodeship: Masovian
- County: Radom
- Gmina: Przytyk

Maksymilianów [maksɨmiˈljanuf] is a village in the administrative district of Gmina Przytyk, within Radom County, Masovian Voivodeship, in east-central Poland.
