= Borkowice, Masovian Voivodeship =

Borkowice
- Village
- Location within Poland
- Coordinates: 51°19′N 20°40′E
- Country: Poland
- Voivodeship: Masovian
- County: Przysucha
- Gmina: Borkowice
- Population: 658
- Website: http://www.borkowice.ug.net.pl

Borkowice [bɔrkɔˈvit͡sɛ] is a village in Przysucha County, Masovian Voivodeship, in east-central Poland. It is the seat of the gmina (administrative district) called Gmina Borkowice.
