= Kochanów Wieniawski =

Village in Gmina Wieniawa, Poland

- Village
- Location within Poland
- Coordinates: 51°22′01″N 20°46′57″E
- Country: Poland
- Voivodeship: Masovian
- County: Przysucha
- Gmina: Wieniawa

Kochanów Wieniawski [kɔˈxanuf vjɛˈɲafski] is a village in the administrative district of Gmina Wieniawa, within Przysucha County, Masovian Voivodeship, in east-central Poland.
