= Dęba, Masovian Voivodeship =

Dęba
- Village
- Location within Poland
- Coordinates: 51°29′N 20°52′E
- Country: Poland
- Voivodeship: Masovian
- County: Radom
- Gmina: Przytyk

Dęba [ˈdɛmba] is a village in the administrative district of Gmina Przytyk, within Radom County, Masovian Voivodeship, in east-central Poland.
