= Gmina Przysucha =

Gmina Przysucha Przysucha Commune
- Gmina
- Coat of arms
- Interactive map of Gmina Przysucha
- Coordinates (Przysucha): 51°22′N 20°37′E
- Country: Poland
- Voivodeship: Masovian
- County: Przysucha
- Seat: Przysucha

Area
  - Total: 181.31 km^{2} (70.00 sq mi)

Population (2006)
  - Total: 12,436
  - Density: 68.590/km^{2} (177.65/sq mi)
  - Urban: 6,245
  - Rural: 6,191
- Website: https://web.archive.org/web/20071221174439/http://www.przysucha.umig.gov.pl/

Gmina Przysucha is an urban-rural gmina (administrative district) in Przysucha County, Masovian Voivodeship, in east-central Poland. Its seat is the town of Przysucha, which lies approximately 98 kilometres (61 mi) south of Warsaw.

The gmina covers an area of 181.31 square kilometres (70.0 sq mi), and as of 2006 its total population is 12,436 (out of which the population of Przysucha amounts to 6,245, and the population of the rural part of the gmina is 6,191).

== Villages ==
Apart from the town of Przysucha, Gmina Przysucha contains the villages and settlements of Beźnik, Dębiny, Długa Brzezina, Gaj, Głęboka Droga, Gliniec, Hucisko, Jakubów, Janików, Janów, Kolonia Szczerbacka, Kozłowiec, Krajów, Kuźnica, Lipno, Mariówka, Pomyków, Ruski Bród, Skrzyńsko, Smogorzów, Wistka, Wola Więcierzowa, Zawada and Zbożenna.

== Neighbouring gminas ==
Gmina Przysucha is bordered by the gminas of Borkowice, Chlewiska, Gielniów, Gowarczów, Końskie, Potworów, Przytyk, Rusinów, Stąporków and Wieniawa.
