= Gmina Potworów =

Gmina Potworów Potworów Commune
- Gmina
- Coat of arms
- Interactive map of Gmina Potworów
- Coordinates (Potworów): 51°31′N 20°43′E
- Country: Poland
- Voivodeship: Masovian
- County: Przysucha
- Seat: Potworów

Area
  - Total: 81.89 km^{2} (31.62 sq mi)

Population (2006)
  - Total: 4,288
  - Density: 52.36/km^{2} (135.6/sq mi)
- Website: http://www.potworow.pl

Gmina Potworów is a rural gmina (administrative district) in Przysucha County, Masovian Voivodeship, in east-central Poland. Its seat is the village of Potworów, which lies approximately 18 kilometres (11 mi) north-east of Przysucha and 82 km (51 mi) south-west of Warsaw.

The gmina covers an area of 81.89 square kilometres (31.6 sq mi), and as of 2006 its total population is 4,288.

== Villages ==
Gmina Potworów contains the villages and settlements of Dąbrowa Goszczewicka, Długie, Dłuska Wola, Gackowice, Grabowa, Grabowska Wola, Jamki, Kacperków, Kozieniec, Łojków, Marysin, Mokrzec, Olszany, Podgóry, Pólka, Potworów, Potworów PGR, Rdzów, Rdzuchów, Rdzuchów-Kolonia, Sady, Wir, Wir Stary, Wir-Kolonia, Wirówek, Wymysłów, Żabia Wólka and Zachatka.

== Neighbouring gminas ==
Gmina Potworów is bordered by the gminas of Klwów, Przysucha, Przytyk, Radzanów, Rusinów and Wyśmierzyce.
