= Wymysłów, Gmina Borkowice =

Wymysłów
- Village
- Location within Poland
- Coordinates: 51°19′6″N 20°37′40″E
- Country: Poland
- Voivodeship: Masovian
- County: Przysucha
- Gmina: Borkowice

Wymysłów [vɨˈmɨswuf] is a village in the administrative district of Gmina Borkowice, within Przysucha County, Masovian Voivodeship, in east-central Poland.
