= Jagodno, Masovian Voivodeship =

Jagodno
- Settlement
- Location within Poland
- Coordinates: 51°27′02″N 20°50′10″E
- Country: Poland
- Voivodeship: Masovian
- County: Radom
- Gmina: Przytyk

Jagodno [jaˈɡɔdnɔ] is a settlement in the administrative district of Gmina Przytyk, within Radom County, Masovian Voivodeship, in east-central Poland.
