= Krzesławice, Masovian Voivodeship =

Krzesławice
- Village
- Location within Poland
- Coordinates: 51°25′N 20°37′E
- Country: Poland
- Voivodeship: Masovian
- County: Przysucha
- Gmina: Rusinów

Krzesławice [kʂɛswaˈvit͡sɛ] is a village in the administrative district of Gmina Rusinów, within Przysucha County, Masovian Voivodeship, in east-central Poland.

== Demographics ==
In the 2021 census, the village had a population of 346 people, equally divided among men and women. The village included 114 households, 24 of which had more than 5 members.

62.7% of inhabitants were of working age, 17.1% were below working age, and the remaining 20.2% were beyond working age.

As the census noted, the village had lost 8% of its population since 1988.
