= Wygnanów, Masovian Voivodeship =

Wygnanów
- Village
- Location within Poland
- Coordinates: 51°28′48″N 20°48′44″E
- Country: Poland
- Voivodeship: Masovian
- County: Radom
- Gmina: Przytyk

Wygnanów [vɨɡˈnanuf] is a village in the administrative district of Gmina Przytyk, within Radom County, Masovian Voivodeship, in east-central Poland.
