= Goszczewice =

- Village
- Location within Poland
- Coordinates: 51°27′33″N 20°47′50″E
- Country: Poland
- Voivodeship: Masovian
- County: Radom
- Gmina: Przytyk

Goszczewice [ɡɔʂt͡ʂɛˈvit͡sɛ] is a village in the administrative district of Gmina Przytyk, within Radom County, Masovian Voivodeship, in east-central Poland.
