= Gmina Wieniawa =

Gmina Wieniawa Wieniawa Commune
- Gmina
- Interactive map of Gmina Wieniawa
- Coordinates (Wieniawa): 51°22′N 20°48′E
- Country: Poland
- Voivodeship: Masovian
- County: Przysucha
- Seat: Wieniawa

Area
  - Total: 104.03 km^{2} (40.17 sq mi)

Population (2006)
  - Total: 5,523
  - Density: 53.09/km^{2} (137.5/sq mi)

Gmina Wieniawa is a rural gmina (administrative district) in Przysucha County, Masovian Voivodeship, in east-central Poland. Its seat is the village of Wieniawa, which lies approximately 13 kilometres (8 mi) east of Przysucha and 96 km (60 mi) south of Warsaw.

The gmina covers an area of 104.03 square kilometres (40.2 sq mi), and as of 2006 its total population is 5,523.

== Villages ==
Gmina Wieniawa contains the villages and settlements of Brudnów, Głogów, Jabłonica, Kaleń, Kamień Duży, Kamień Mały, Kłudno, Kochanów Wieniawski, Komorów, Konary, Koryciska, Plec, Pogroszyn, Romualdów, Ryków, Skrzynno, Sokolniki Mokre, Sokolniki Suche, Wieniawa, Wola Brudnowska, Wydrzyn, Zadąbrów, Zagórze, Zawady and Żuków.

== Neighbouring gminas ==
Gmina Wieniawa is bordered by the gminas of Borkowice, Chlewiska, Orońsko, Przysucha, Przytyk, Szydłowiec and Wolanów.
