= Wieniawa, Masovian Voivodeship =

Wieniawa
- Village
- St Catherine's Church

- Location within Poland
- Coordinates: 51°22′N 20°48′E
- Country: Poland
- Voivodeship: Masovian
- County: Przysucha
- Gmina: Wieniawa

Wieniawa [vjɛˈɲava] is a village in Przysucha County, Masovian Voivodeship, in east-central Poland (historic Lesser Poland). It is the seat of the gmina (administrative district) called Gmina Wieniawa.

The history of the village dates back to the late Middle Ages, and its original name was Klodno. The Roman Catholic parish at Klodno was founded in 1365, but the history of the first church here dates back to 1264. In the second half of the 15th century, the village was purchased by the Wieniawita noble family, which changed its name to Wieniawa.

The village is famous for its parish church, which was founded in the year 1511 by father Stanislaw Mlodecki, in the location of the 13th-century wooden church. The oldest part of the church is a late Gothic presbytery, together with St. Stanislaus chapel. The nave with two side altars were built in 1703, and the whole complex was renovated in 1909–12.

The most interesting element in the church is its main altar, known as the Wieniawa Polyptych, which comes from the year 1544, and is in Renaissance style. The names of creators of the main altar are not known, and the Wieniawa Polyptych is regarded as one of the finest examples of Renaissance art in the Radom Land. It consists of three parts, illustrating the life and death of Saint Stanislaus of Szczepanow, Bishop and Martyr.

== See also ==
- Wieniawa coat of arms
