= Studzienice, Masovian Voivodeship =

Studzienice
- Village
- Location within Poland
- Coordinates: 51°29′23″N 20°53′41″E
- Country: Poland
- Voivodeship: Masovian
- County: Radom
- Gmina: Przytyk
- Population: 200

Studzienice [stud͡ʑɛˈnit͡sɛ] is a village in the administrative district of Gmina Przytyk, within Radom County, Masovian Voivodeship, in east-central Poland.
