= Domaniów, Masovian Voivodeship =

Domaniów
- Village
- Location within Poland
- Coordinates: 51°26′06″N 20°50′40″E
- Country: Poland
- Voivodeship: Masovian
- County: Radom
- Gmina: Przytyk

Domaniów [dɔˈmaɲuf] is a village in the administrative district of Gmina Przytyk, within Radom County, Masovian Voivodeship, in east-central Poland.
