= Wymysłów, Silesian Voivodeship =

Village in Silesia

Wymysłów
- Village
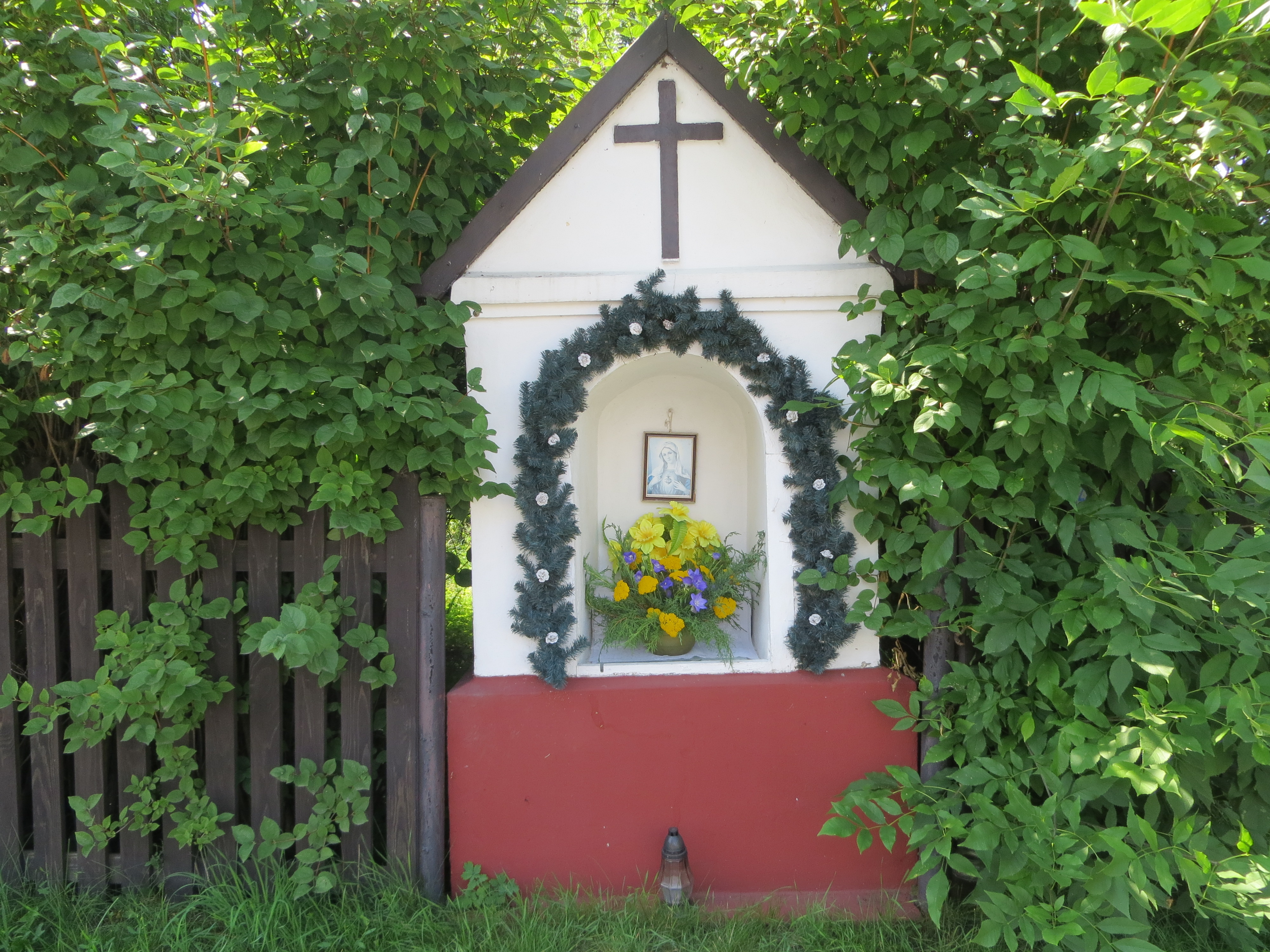
- A wayside shrine in the village

- Location within Poland
- Coordinates: 50°24′N 18°59′E
- Country: Poland
- Voivodeship: Silesian
- County: Będzin
- Gmina: Bobrowniki
- Population: 572
- Website: http://www.wymyslow.pl

Wymysłów [vɨˈmɨswuf] (former German name Wimslau) is a village in the administrative district of Gmina Bobrowniki, within Będzin County, Silesian Voivodeship, in southern Poland.

The village has a population of 572.
