= Kochanovce, Bardejov District =

Kochanovce
- Municipality
- Flag

- Location of Kochanovce in the Prešov Region Location of Kochanovce in Slovakia
- Coordinates: 49.19°N 21.39°E
- Country: Slovakia
- Region: Prešov Region
- District: Bardejov District
- First mentioned: 1384

Area
  - Total: 5.52 km^{2} (2.13 sq mi)
- Elevation: 241 m (791 ft)

Population (2025)
  - Total: 256
- Time zone: UTC+1 (CET)
  - Summer (DST): UTC+2 (CEST)
- Postal code: 864 6
- Area code: +421 54
- Vehicle registration plate (until 2022): BJ
- Website: www.obeckochanovce.sk

Kochanovce (Hungarian: Kiskohány) is a village and municipality in Bardejov District in the Prešov Region of north-east Slovakia.

== History ==
The village was first mentioned in historical records in 1384. Prior to the Treaty of Trianon, it was part of Sáros county.

== Geography ==
The municipality lies at an altitude of 241 metres (791 ft) and covers an area of 5.52 km^{2} (2.13 sq mi) (2025).

== Population ==
Population statistic (10 years)
Year	1995	2005	2015	2025
Count	235	255	253	256
Difference		+8.51%	−0.78%	+1.18%

Population statistic
Year	2024	2025
Count	261	256
Difference		−1.91%

It has a population of 256 people (31 December 2025).

=== Ethnicity ===
Census 2021 (1+ %)
Ethnicity	Number	Fraction
Slovak	272	100%
Total	272	

In year 2021 was 272 people by ethnicity 272 as Slovak.

Note on population: The difference values of population numbers in the table "Population statistic" and in the sections "Ethnicity" & "Religion" is caused by the use of various statistical methods.

=== Religion ===
Census 2021 (1+ %)
Religion	Number	Fraction
Evangelical Church	133	48.9%
Roman Catholic Church	125	45.96%
Church of the Brethren	5	1.84%
Greek Catholic Church	4	1.47%
None	4	1.47%
Total	272	

In year 2021 was 272 people by religion 133 from Evangelical Church, 125 from Roman Catholic Church, 5 from Church of the Brethren, 4 from Greek Catholic Church, 4 from None and 1 from Christian Congregations in Slovakia.

== Genealogical resources ==
The records for genealogical research are available at the state archive "Statny Archiv in Presov, Slovakia"

- Greek Catholic church records (births/marriages/deaths): 1854-1901 (parish B)

== See also ==
- List of municipalities and towns in Slovakia
