= Marysin, Gmina Mircze =

Marysin
- Village
- Location within Poland
- Coordinates: 50°37′38″N 23°53′30″E
- Country: Poland
- Voivodeship: Lublin
- County: Hrubieszów
- Gmina: Mircze

Marysin [maˈrɨɕin] is a village in the administrative district of Gmina Mircze, within Hrubieszów County, Lublin Voivodeship, in eastern Poland, close to the border with Ukraine.
