= Mykolas Dluskis =

Lithuanian painter

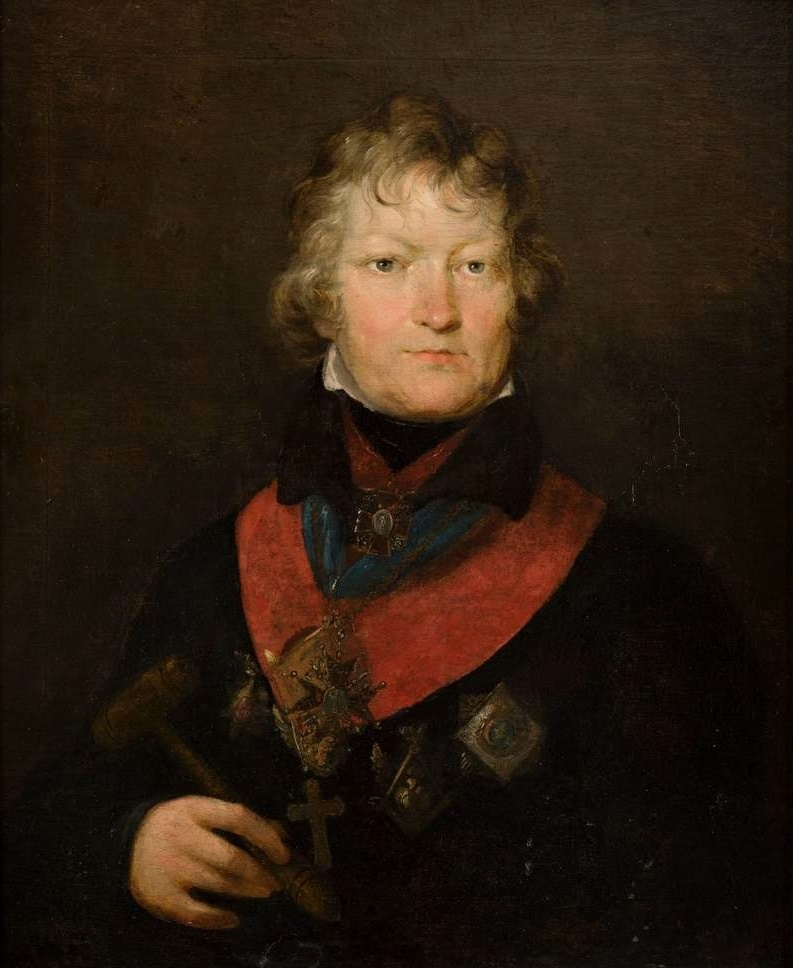
Portrait of Canon Michał Dłuski (Portrait of a freemason) by Jan Rustem

Michał Dłuski (Lithuanian: Mykolas Dluskis, September 1760 – 10 April 1821) was a Polish–Lithuanian priest, patriotic activist, member and master of Masonic lodges.

From 1777 to 1784, he studied in Warsaw and Vilnius in theology and was ordained as a priest in 1783. From 1788 onward he was a priest at Vilnius Cathedral. From 1789 to 1792, he visited Germany and Italy. From 1797 onward he was an Educational Commission member. He co-founded the Vilnius Charity Society.

In 1817, he anonymously published in Vilnius in Polish A Letter from the Rabbi of Lisbon to the Rabbi of Brest, translated from the rabbinical-Talmudic dialect. In this work, he argued that Freemasonry originated from secret organizations founded in Palestine by Jews, and that Jesus Christ had been a member of one of them.

== See also ==
- List of Lithuanian painters
