= Przysucha County =

Przysucha County Powiat przysuski
- County
- Flag Coat of arms

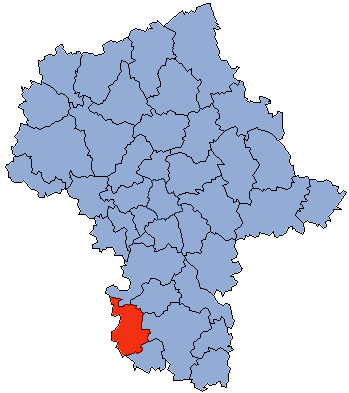
- Location within the voivodeship

- Division into gminas
- Coordinates (Przysucha): 51°22′N 20°37′E
- Country: Poland
- Voivodeship: Masovian
- Seat: Przysucha
- Gminas: Total 8: Gmina Borkowice; Gmina Gielniów; Gmina Klwów; Gmina Odrzywół; Gmina Potworów; Gmina Przysucha; Gmina Rusinów; Gmina Wieniawa

Area
  - Total: 800.68 km^{2} (309.14 sq mi)

Population (2019)
  - Total: 41,721
  - Density: 52.107/km^{2} (134.96/sq mi)
  - Urban: 5,818
  - Rural: 35,903
- Car plates: WPY
- Website: www.przysucha.pl

Przysucha County (Polish: powiat przysuski) is a unit of territorial administration and local government (powiat) in Masovian Voivodeship, east-central Poland. It came into being on January 1, 1999, as a result of the Polish local government reforms passed in 1998. Its administrative seat and only town is Przysucha, which lies 98 kilometres (61 mi) south of Warsaw.

The county covers an area of 800.68 square kilometres (309.1 sq mi). As of 2019 its total population is 41,721, out of which the population of Przysucha is 5,818, and the rural population is 35,903.

== Neighbouring counties ==
Przysucha County is bordered by Grójec County to the north, Białobrzegi County to the north-east, Radom County to the east, Szydłowiec County to the south-east, Końskie County to the south-west, and Opoczno County and Tomaszów County to the west.

== Administrative divisions ==
The county is subdivided into eight gminas (one urban-rural and seven rural). These are listed in the following table, in descending order of population.

Gmina	Type	Area (km^{2})	Population (2019)	Seat
Gmina Przysucha	urban-rural	181.3	11,847	Przysucha
Gmina Wieniawa	rural	104.0	5,287	Wieniawa
Gmina Gielniów	rural	79.2	4,581	Gielniów
Gmina Borkowice	rural	86.1	4,302	Borkowice
Gmina Rusinów	rural	82.9	4,274	Rusinów
Gmina Potworów	rural	81.9	4,218	Potworów
Gmina Odrzywół	rural	94.8	3,808	Odrzywół
Gmina Klwów	rural	90.5	3,404	Klwów
