= Hubal pacifications =

Repressive action carried out by the German occupiers in Poland

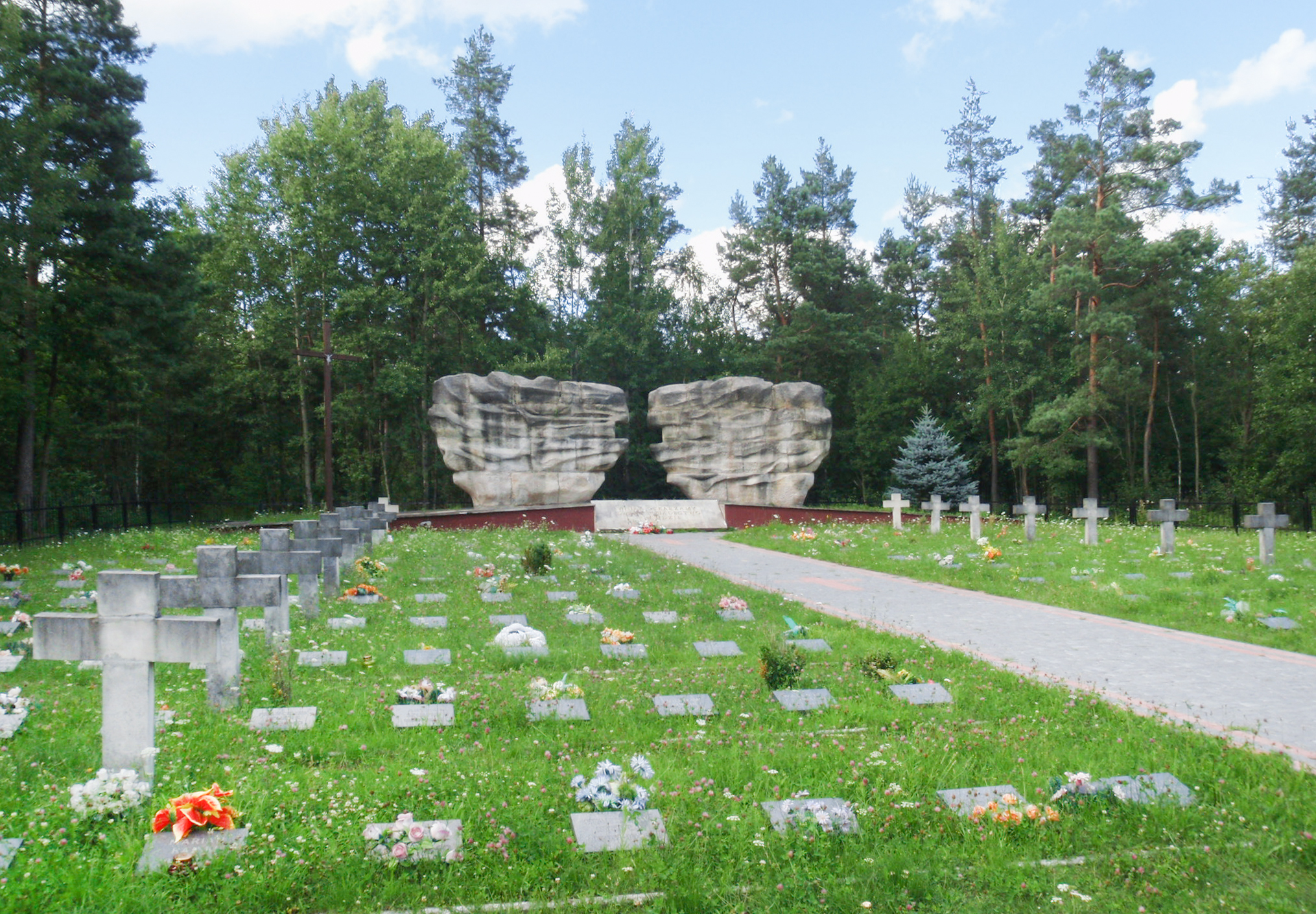
Cemetery of the victims of the Skłoby pacification

The Hubal pacifications is a term used to describe a repressive action carried out by the German occupiers in Poland from March 30 to April 11, 1940. It targeted villages located near areas where the unit of Major Henryk Dobrzański, codenamed Hubal, was operating.

The pacification operation involved Schutzstaffel units, Ordnungspolizei, Selbstschutz, and the National Socialist Motor Corps. A total of 31 villages in the counties of Końskie, Kielce, and Opoczno were subjected to various forms of repression. Four villages were completely burned down, while most of the buildings in a fifth village were destroyed. In total, 712 Polish civilians were murdered, including two women and six children.

The Hubal pacifications were the first repressive action of this kind carried out by the Germans in occupied Poland and Europe.

== Origins ==
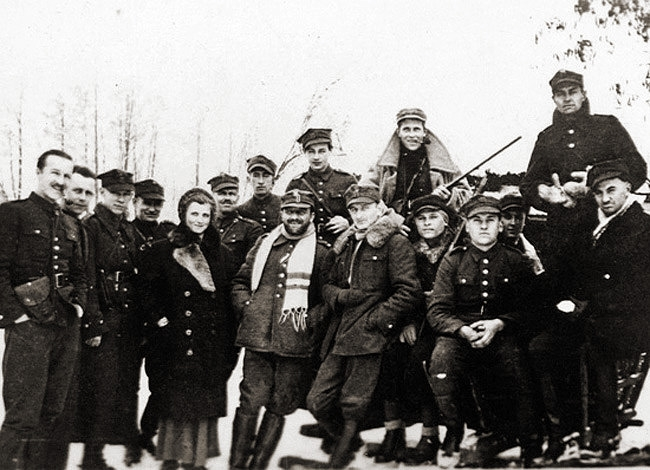
Major Henryk Dobrzański, codenamed Hubal, with his soldiers. Winter 1939/1940

In the last days of the September Campaign, Major Henryk Dobrzański of the 110th Reserve Uhlan Regiment gathered around him a group of officers and soldiers determined to continue fighting the Germans. Initially, Dobrzański planned to come to the aid of besieged Warsaw, and when he received news of its capitulation, he decided to break through to Hungary and from there reach the rebuilding Polish Army in France. Several dozen of his subordinates had similar intentions. In the first days of October 1939, the unit made its way to the Świętokrzyskie Mountains, where an enthusiastic reception from the local population convinced the major that the September defeat had not broken the will of the Polish society to resist. The idea of marching to Hungary was then abandoned in favor of continuing armed resistance in the occupied country. Shortly thereafter, Major Dobrzański adopted the codename Hubal. Beginning in February 1940, his unit was known as the Detached Unit of the Polish Army.

The area of operation for Hubal’s unit became the Kielce Land. The major aimed to await the anticipated Franco-British offensive in the spring of 1940 and then support the actions of the Allies with intense military actions behind German lines. To this end, he attempted to create a clandestine military organization (the so-called Kielce Combat District) that would serve as support for his unit and help organize society in preparation for future armed uprising. In the first decade of March 1940, the unit already had 320 soldiers. Major Hubal gained great popularity and authority among the local population, and his activities contributed to breaking the prevailing apathy and discouragement in Polish society.

Meanwhile, in mid-March 1940, the leadership of the Union of Armed Struggle, whose concepts of fighting the occupier were drastically different from Hubal’s plans, attempted to disband the unit. On the order of the commander of the Łódź District of the Home Army, Colonel Leopold Okulicki, codenamed Miller, a significant number of officers and soldiers left the ranks (on March 13). 70 soldiers remained with Hubal, who was determined to continue open combat. The reduced unit left its previous quarters in the village of Gałki and moved to the village of Hucisko, where it stayed for over two weeks. Due to an influx of volunteers, its number soon increased to over 100 soldiers.

Hubal tried to avoid serious clashes with the Germans. Nevertheless, the very existence of a Polish unit was a cause for concern for the occupiers, especially in light of the expected outbreak of fighting on the Western Front. In March 1940, the Germans began preparations to deal with Hubal, but jurisdictional disputes between the Wehrmacht and the police authorities of the General Government temporarily delayed the start of the hunt.

== First pacifications ==
On 30 March 1940, German SS and Ordnungspolizei units, concentrated in the vicinity of Skarżysko-Kamienna, Szydłowiec, Chlewiska, and Przysucha, launched a hunt for the Polish unit. The attack on the headquarters of Hubal's soldiers in Hucisko resulted in a severe defeat for the Germans. The Polish soldiers not only repelled the enemy's attack but also forced them to retreat, inflicting heavy losses of around 100 killed and wounded. The Polish losses were limited to 13 killed and missing, 10 wounded, and one deserter.

On the same day that the battle at Hucisko took place, the advancing second wave of the Ordnungspolizei unit detained all the men present in the village of Stefanków, totaling 77 individuals. The detainees were first taken to the forestry office in Chlewiska and then to the Szydłowiec Town Hall. During transportation and their stay at staging points, the prisoners were beaten and tormented. Ultimately, all the men from Stefanków were taken to the prison in Radom, where they were subjected to intense interrogations and brutal treatment. Since some of the detainees were miners from the Skalna Górka mine, director Absolon from Kielce intervened on their behalf. As a result, after a few days, eleven prisoners were released from prison, but ultimately only seven returned to their homes. Four others were reportedly re-arrested shortly after leaving the prison walls.

On March 30, the German police also conducted searches and arrests in several other villages. In Gałki – where the Germans knew there had previously been Hubal's headquarters, and which was the second target of the assault after Hucisko – 40 men aged 15 to 60 were detained. Another 23 men were arrested in nearby Mechlin. The detainees from both villages were marched on foot to Gielniów, from where they were transported by trucks to the estate in Korytków, where the Germans arrested two more individuals (the local landowner and his son). Ultimately, all the detainees were imprisoned in Radom. That day, a total of 157 people arrested during the hunt for Hubal's unit found themselves in the cells of the Radom prison.

Meanwhile, Hubal's soldiers managed to break away from the enemy and, after a 25-kilometer march, reached the village of Szałas. On March 31, the unguarded Hucisko was occupied by SS and Selbstschutz units. The Germans arrested 33 men, (Note: After the battle at Hucisko, the villagers asked Hubal for advice on what to do next. He replied, "The men and women could leave" (Kacperski & Wroniszewski (2005, pp. 25, 106)). Ultimately, only some of the villagers heeded this suggestion (Kosztyła (1987, p. 181); Fajkowski (1972, p. 70)).) beat them, and then locked them in an empty house on the outskirts of the village. It is likely that they initially intended to burn the prisoners alive; however, they ultimately escorted them to Boków, where another five men were arrested. Then, all 38 detainees were marched on foot to Wołów. During the march, a resident of Hucisko who could not keep up with the column was shot. In Wołów, the Germans released three underage boys from Hucisko, while the remaining 34 detainees were taken to the prison in Radom.

On April 1, the Germans made another attempt to dismantle Hubal's unit. During the fighting in the area of Szałas, the Polish soldiers managed to repel the attack and break away from the enemy. On the same day, in one of the settlements of Szałas, called Komorniki, the Germans arrested all encountered men, totaling 28 individuals (on April 1). The raiding parties also executed two men in Suchedniów.

Meanwhile, Hubal directed his unit east, intending to break through to the Świętokrzyskie Mountains. However, the attempt to cross the road from Skarżysko-Kamienna to Kielce ended in failure. In this situation, the major turned back west, simultaneously dividing his unit into two parts. On the night of April 1/2, a cavalry subunit led by Hubal broke through the positions of the 8th SS-Totenkopfverbände Regiment deployed along the road between Odrowąż and Samsonów. The cavalrymen then hid all day in a dense thicket and, after nightfall, set off toward Podchyby, where they stealthily crossed the outer ring of the German blockade. However, the infantry subunit was unable to breach the German cordon. Its commander, Second Lieutenant Marek Szymański, codenamed Sęp, was forced to allow the soldiers to leave the encirclement on their own. Hubal waited in vain for the infantry for two days in the village of Kamienna Wola before resuming his retreat to the southwest. Shortly thereafter, reduced to 23 soldiers, the unit took quarters in the village of Mały Węgrzyn. The Germans, having lost combat contact with Hubal's soldiers, announced on April 2 the end of the operation and the dismantling of the Polish unit.

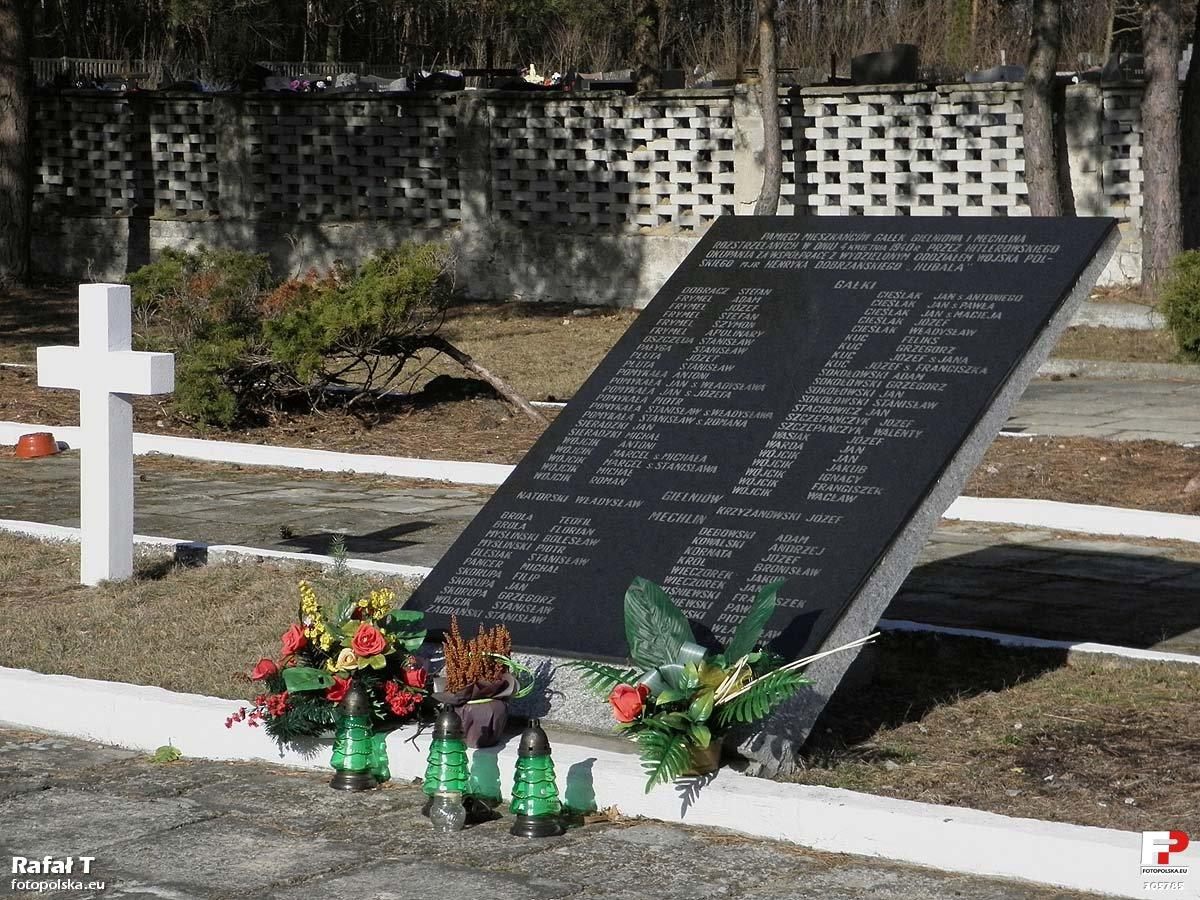
Plaque at the cemetery in Firlej commemorating the victims of the executions of 4 April 1940

The fate of those arrested in the first days of the hunt was tragically severe in most cases. On 4 April 1940, at the execution site in Firlej near Radom, the Germans shot 145 men, including 70 residents of Stefanków, (Note: Some sources state that on 4 April 1940, 72 men arrested in Stefanków were executed at Firlej (Porczek (2008, p. 276); Fajkowski (1972, p. 67)). However, it is likely that two individuals were mistakenly added to the list of victims, as they were murdered by the Germans in September 1944, during the second pacification of the village (Fajkowski & Religa (1981, pp. 300–301)).) 40 residents of Gałki, 23 residents of Mechlin, and two residents of Korytków. Around the same time, 24 residents of Szałas-Komorniki were executed in Kielce. The remaining four prisoners from this village were transferred to detention in Skarżysko-Kamienna. They were likely executed on 29 June 1940 during a large execution in the Brzask forest.

A different fate befell the detainees from Hucisko and Boków. Two men were released from the prison in Radom after some time, although one of them died shortly afterward. Meanwhile, 32 men were taken to the Sachsenhausen concentration camp on 17 July 1940. Of this group, only eight survived their time in the camp (seven from Hucisko, one from Boków).

== German crimes from April 4–8 ==
The unsuccessful attempts to dismantle Hubal's unit damaged the prestige of the German police authorities. This was likely the key reason why the SS and Police Leader in the General Government (HSSPF Ost), SS-Obergruppenführer Friedrich-Wilhelm Krüger, decided to conduct a large-scale pacification operation against the villages near which the Polish unit operated. Retaliation against the civilian population was meant to obscure the impression of failure caused by the previous defeats in combating Hubal.

Command and communication were entirely inadequate [...] The behavior of the police formations regarding reconnaissance, security, and combat posture did not meet even the most basic requirements [...] They shot at everything in sight – at women and crows alike [...] On April 5, it was reported that SS-Obergruppenführer Krüger was in the field, personally directing the retaliatory action. The plan is to execute all men residing in the villages affected by the fighting.

On April 5, an emergency meeting was held in Końskie, attended by Polish mayors and village heads from the Końskie County. The head of the internal affairs department in the office of the governor of the Radom District, who was present, announced that the Polish armed uprising would be suppressed with absolute force, and "wherever the population cooperated with the bandits, villages will be burned, and the inhabitants shot". Dr. Albrecht, the German district head of Końskie, warned that he would not be able to prevent reprisals unless the population demonstrated "diligent cooperation". That same day, Albrecht issued a proclamation falsely reporting the destruction of Hubal's unit and threatening:

It has been noted that inciters and agitators have been active for months in various localities in the district, receiving weapons, uniforms, horses, food supplies, and volunteers from the civilian population, about which I have not been informed by the village heads and mayors in every case. By remaining silent about such actions and arms caches, the silent become accomplices in the rebellion, and their fate will be that of the rebels [...] Only if the population unequivocally distances itself from the agitators and reports to me about suspects, as well as arms caches, documents, and uniforms, will I be able to prevent the impending action. However, if such things continue to be concealed, I will not be able to defend the population, as I will have no facts to prove their peacefulness.

Meanwhile, in a communiqué issued to the population of the Końskie region on 4 April 1940, Hubal refuted German reports of the destruction of his unit, while stating:

The Germans are trying another way to force us to disarm. Namely, they are threatening reprisals against the civilian population. This is such a dishonorable and vile act that only German brutality could conceive of it. The population is all the more innocent because, when faced with an armed unit, they must meet its demands. We communicate: for every person who suffers because of us, we will take merciless revenge, using German methods. Let every German soldier think carefully before raising a hand against a defenseless Pole.

== Manhunt in the Mniów–Sielpia Wielka–Stąporków triangle ==
From April 4 to 6, SS and police units encircled the area within the Mniów–Sielpia Wielka–Stąporków triangle. The Germans failed to corner Hubal's unit, as it had left the area days earlier. However, numerous crimes were committed against civilians during the blockade. In Krasna, SS men from the 11th SS-Totenkopf Regiment burned one house and killed two men (April 4–5). In Koprusa, policemen from the 111th Ordnungspolizei Battalion murdered the family of Marian Gut – both his parents and two siblings aged 3 and 12 – and burned their farm (April 4). Two days later, the Germans murdered one man in Matyniów.

On April 6, two strong SS columns set out from Końskie to block crossings on the Czarna river. The first unit, heading toward Małachów and the Kamienny Krzyż forester's lodge, killed 11 men in Małachów, including eight villagers, two forest workers, and a passerby. That same day, the second column passed through the villages of Stadnicka Wola, Jelenia Góra, Niebo, and Piekło, executing 24 Polish men along the way. On April 7, SS men from the same unit killed five more people, including two children. Among the victims were three residents of Sielpia Mała. In this village, one farmstead was also burned.

On April 7, the Germans made several raids deeper into the blockaded area. In the Krasna region, they burned the Adamek forester's lodge and murdered forester Konstanty Dutkiewicz. In Chyby and Baran, they killed two men and burned a farm and a barn. Additionally, about 100 men were arrested in these villages and taken to prison in Kielce. (Note: Fajkowski & Religa (1981, p. 109) state that these events took place in Krasna.) However, the worst crimes occurred in Adamów and Królewiec. In Adamów, the Germans burned several farms, shot two men, and arrested most of the remaining inhabitants. The detainees were marched to Smyków, where five men were killed along the way, and two more were wounded. Meanwhile, in Królewiec, the Germans set up firing positions from which they shelled nearby villages and hamlets. At one point, SS-Hauptsturmführer Stanfer, commander of the 7th Company of the 8th SS-Totenkopf Regiment, was killed by a stray bullet. His comrades believed he was shot by a Polish sniper, prompting the German command to order a retaliatory pacification. All conscription-aged men in Królewiec were arrested and marched to Smyków. At the same time, SS men burned Królewiec and set fires in several nearby hamlets (Zastawie, Podzastawie, Piaski Królewieckie). Later that day, nearly all of the detainees from neighboring villages were executed in a field and forest near Smyków. The pacifications of Adamów and Królewiec claimed 83 lives: 61 residents of Królewiec, 18 from Adamów, and one each from Chyby, Muszczarz, Piaseczno, and Znajoma. The Germans also burned 55 farms, including most of Królewiec's buildings. The crimes were committed by soldiers of the 7th and 8th Companies of the 8th SS-Totenkopf Regiment, commanded by SS-Oberführer Leo von Jena.

On April 8, two strong columns of SS men, policemen, and members of the Selbstschutz entered the blockaded area. The manhunt affected villages already pacified in previous days (Królewiec, Adamów, Chyby), but bypassed Miedzierza, Komorów, and German-occupied villages along the perimeter of the triangle. In the forest near Błotnica, the Germans shot three men returning from church, including a 14-year-old boy. From 15 villages and an indeterminate number of hamlets, they rounded up all the men (from 1,500 to 2,000 people), gathering them at assembly points in Pieradła, Serbinów, Smyków, and Zaborowice. During the operation, the detainees were beaten and terrorized – some had mock executions staged, were photographed holding weapons, and were threatened with the harshest penalties for aiding "bandits". At the assembly points, the Germans checked the detainees' identities, trying to identify Jews, (Note: During the raid conducted on April 8, the Germans reportedly killed one Jew in Przyłogi (Terror hitlerowski (1988, p. 66)).) village heads, teachers, members of the Military Training Corps, small traders, and those registered for less than three months. Most of the detainees were eventually released. However, about 100 men, including all those captured in Królewiec (over 20), were taken to Skarżysko-Kamienna and imprisoned in a school-turned-jail in Bzin. After the manhunt ended, the blockade was lifted.

The fates of those arrested on April 7–8 varied. After two weeks, the detainees from Chyby and Baran were released from Kielce prison, but many had been interrogated and tortured. The men taken to the jail in Skarżysko-Kamienna were also subjected to brutal treatment. At least 20 of them, including 19 residents of Królewiec, were executed on June 29 in the Brzask forest. The remaining prisoners were eventually released, though one died shortly afterward from injuries sustained during torture.

=== Pacification of Szałas Stary ===
A few days after the battles with Hubal's unit near Szałas (fought on April 1), the Germans returned to the village. They gathered all the men in the local school building and ordered them to report on the movements of the Polish unit. At the same time, they threatened death for failure to comply with the order.

On April 8, a German punitive expedition pacified Szałas Stary. The pacifiers first ordered all men to gather at the school under the pretext of a meeting. They then began driving the population out of their homes, killing several sick or elderly men in the process. Women and children were instructed to take their most necessary belongings and head towards Komorniki. After some time, the men were led out of the school and executed in small groups in barns or by the walls of houses. The village buildings were completely burned down.

On that day, 64 men were murdered in Szałas Stary. 50 homesteads were destroyed. The crimes were committed by soldiers of the 1st SS Cavalry Regiment (1st SS-Totenkopf-Reiterstandarte) and members of the paramilitary Selbstschutz.

It was only after three days that the Germans ordered the residents of the neighboring village of Zaupuście to collect the bodies of the murdered and bury them in a nearby field.

== Last stage of the repressive operation ==
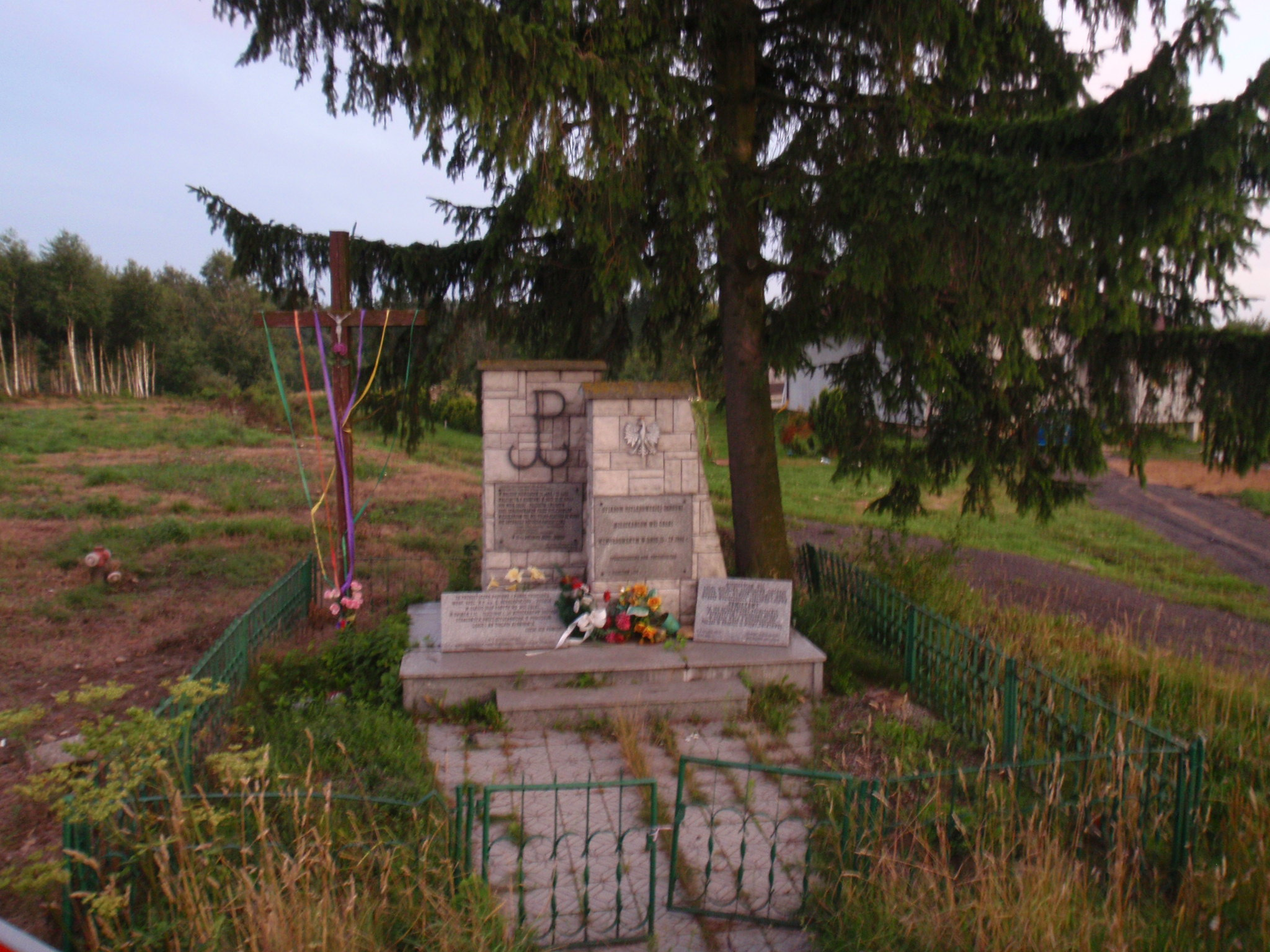
Memorial to the victims of the pacification of Gałki

On April 11, the final act of the repressive operation took place. On this day, the Germans pacified three villages: Gałki, Hucisko, and Skłoby. Zygmunt Kosztyła suspected that these crimes – like the earlier pacification of Szałas Stary – were ordered by SS-Obergruppenführer Krüger to cover up the failure of SS and police units during the manhunt in the Mniów–Sielpia Wielka–Stąporków triangle. The civilians murdered by Krüger were later included in his reports as fallen partisans, thus artificially inflating the losses inflicted on Hubal's unit.

On the night of April 10/11, Skłoby was surrounded by a punitive expedition. The Germans detained almost all adult men and boys, who were taken to Stefanków and then transported to the school in Chlewiska. At the school, the prisoners’ identities were checked, leading to the release of some individuals under 15 or over 60 years old. Meanwhile, the Germans completely burned the village. Shortly thereafter, groups of 10 men were led out of the school building, transported by truck to the Rzuców forest, and executed over previously dug graves. The wounded were finished off with bayonets. Only four prisoners survived the massacre by escaping from the site of the execution. Over 20 men also survived by either evading capture by the Germans or being released shortly after their detention. The Main Commission for the Investigation of Nazi Crimes in Poland estimated the number of those murdered at 265 people (other sources suggest that 215, 216, or 228 men were executed). The village, which before the war had about 400 homesteads, was almost entirely burned down. Only the school and from 2 to 5 other buildings survived. This was the bloodiest of all the Hubal pacifications. The crime was committed by members of the 51st Ordnungspolizei Battalion. According to Polish sources, members of the SS and Selbstschutz also participated in the pacification.

A few days after the first pacification in Hucisko, a provocateur appeared, posing as a Polish officer. He questioned the locals about the names of men who had avoided arrest on March 31. On April 11, SS units, Ordnungspolizei, and Selbstschutz returned to the former headquarters of Hubal's unit. The village, which had over 100 households, was completely burned down. Women and children were given just 15 minutes to gather livestock and essential personal belongings before being driven to the village of Długa Brzezina. 22 men who hadn't managed to escape were executed with machine-gun fire at the road leading to Boków. The wounded were finished off with bayonets. After the execution, the Germans supposedly threw grenades into the mass grave. Moreover, during a search of the women and children as they were being led to Długa Brzezina, the Germans found a man hiding among them, whom they beat to death with rifle butts. (Note: Other sources state that 25 men were murdered that day in Hucisko (Fajkowski & Religa (1981, p. 295)).)

In Gałki, which had been pacified for the first time on March 30, Ordnungspolizei officers murdered 11 men and a child. According to one witness, the victims were tied with rope, led out of the village, and shot. The bodies were buried at the execution site. The village, which had about 50 households, was completely burned down. The Germans gave the women and children an hour to empty the houses and take out the livestock, though they later destroyed the belongings and equipment that had been removed. A few months later, the occupying authorities allowed the survivors to return to their home village but forbade its reconstruction.

News of the pacifications shocked Hubal. Despite the German reprisals and clear orders from the High Command, the major was determined to continue open warfare in Polish uniform. He fought until 30 April 1940 when he was killed in a battle with a German manhunt near Anielin. Deprived of their leader, the unit continued its combat activities until 25 June 1940 when it disbanded.

During a conference on "extraordinary measures necessary to ensure peace and order in the General Government", held in Kraków on 16 May 1940, General Governor Hans Frank cited the actions of Major Hubal's unit as one of the examples demonstrating the alleged threat of a Polish uprising, which was used to justify the need for the extermination of Polish intelligentsia as part of the so-called AB-Aktion.

== Summary ==
The Hubal pacifications were the first such repressive actions carried out by the Germans in occupied Poland and Europe. In less than two weeks, various forms of repression affected 31 villages in the pre-war counties of Końskie, Kielce, and Opoczno: (Note: Three pacified villages were located in the Kielce District, two in the Opoczno District, and the remaining ones belonged to the Końskie District (Terror hitlerowski (1988, p. 45)).)

- The Germans committed arson in 12 locations, destroying approximately 620 farmsteads. Four villages – Gałki, Hucisko, Skłoby, and Szałas Stary – were completely or nearly completely burned down, while much of the built-up area in Królewiec was also destroyed.
- In 8 villages – Gałki, Hucisko, Królewcu, Mechlin, Skłoby, Stefanków, Szałas Stary, Szałas-Komorniki – the Germans attempted to exterminate the entire male population. This intention was only unsuccessful in Hucisko.
- Five villages – Adamów, Gałki, Hucisko, Królewiec, and Szałas – were repressed twice.

The Main Commission for the Investigation of Hitlerite Crimes in Poland established that during the Hubal pacifications, 712 civilians were murdered, including two women and six children. Of these, 503 were killed directly during the pacifications, 183 were imprisoned and subsequently executed, 24 died in concentration camps, and two died as a result of torture. Eight individuals were imprisoned for five years in concentration camps. Between 190 and 200 detainees spent several weeks in prisons, where they were subjected to torture and brutal treatment. Additionally, nearly 2,000 Polish civilians were detained at collection points and terrorized.

In other Polish sources, the number of victims of the Hubal pacifications has been estimated at 711 or 713. German investigators and historians initially tended to underestimate the number of victims. In a report from the chief of the Ordnungspolizei dated 15 May 1940, it was recorded that a total of 257 Poles were shot during the "action near Końskie". This number was also adopted by the Munich National Prosecutor's Office, which conducted an investigation into the Hubal pacifications after the war. Wolfgang Jacobmeyer estimated the number of victims in a 1972 article to be at least 344. However, Robert Seidel, in his 2006 book on German occupation policy in the Radom District, relied on Polish sources, following them in concluding that 713 Poles died as a result of the pacification actions.

The greatest human losses were as follows: Skłoby (265 victims), Szałas (92 victims), Królewiec (80 victims), Stefanków (70 victims), Gałki (52 victims), Hucisko (43 victims), Stadnicka Wola, Jelenia Góra, Niebo, Piekło, and Sielpia Mała (29 victims), Mechlin (23 victims), Adamów (18 victims), Małachów Fabryczny (11 victims), Boków (4 victims), Koprusa (4 victims), Błotnica (3 victims). In other villages, the number of murdered did not exceed 1 or 2 persons.

The inhabitants of the pacified villages did not take direct part in the fight against the Germans, and in many cases, they had no connections with the Polish Armed Forces' Detached Unit. Andrzej Jankowski points out that only the pacification of Szałas-Komorniki was directly accompanied by the fight fought by the Germans against the soldiers of Hubal. In the remaining cases, repression against the civilian population was applied even before the start of actions against the Polish unit (e.g., the first pacification of Gałki) or only after their conclusion, sometimes even after several days (e.g., the pacifications of Szałas Stary and Hucisko, the second pacification of Gałki). Furthermore, victims of German repression included villages where the Hubal unit never stationed (Stefanków, Skłoby), and even those through which it never passed (Królewiec).

Robert Seidel considered the Hubal pacifications to mark the beginning of a new phase in German occupation policy in the Radom District, as they represented an expansion of mass terror to groups beyond just the intelligentsia.

== Assessments by contemporary figures and historians ==
The events that unfolded in the Kielce region in the spring of 1940 reinforced the Polish leadership's conviction about the necessity of avoiding armed confrontation with the occupier. In a report dated 15 April 1940, Colonel Stefan Rowecki informed General Kazimierz Sosnkowski:

In Końskie, there was an insane outburst by Hubal (Major Do), who twice disobeyed the order to disband the partisans and initiated an armed uprising, albeit a brief one, costing the lives of many peasants who were shot in nearby villages. I am pursuing Hubal; I want to send him abroad and will bring him to trial in the future.

In a report dated November 21 of the same year, Rowecki noted:

The organization faced significant difficulties regarding the matter of Hubal. This brave but unruly officer began a partisan struggle against the Germans on his own, contrary to the orders of the Command General. As a result, he was defeated and later died during his escape [...] The consequences of this: bloody terror, the complete destruction of several villages, and the execution of 700 peasants, contributed to deterring people from the organization.

Colonel Jan Rzepecki also placed shared responsibility for the pacifications and the deaths of over 700 people on Hubal in his memoirs published in the 1950s. Wolfgang Jacobmeyer indicated that the mere existence of his unit indirectly posed a threat to the civilian population, as the German occupying authorities needed only the slightest suspicion to impose ruthless reprisals.

Later, defenders of Hubal countered similar accusations, arguing that the German occupation was genocidal from the outset, and the Germans never needed a pretext to carry out mass murders of the civilian population. Therefore, the pacifications should be viewed as part of a deliberate policy of exterminating the Polish nation. They also emphasized that one of the key reasons Hubal intended to avoid serious confrontations with the enemy until the start of the Allied offensive was to prevent reprisals against the civilian population. (Note: In a document titled Outline of the Combat District Kielce dated 2 November 1939, Major Hubal wrote: "Until combat operations take the form of open warfare, one must seriously consider the possibility of enemy reprisals, which could harm the civilian population. Every effort must be made to avoid such consequences at all costs" (Kosztyła (1987, p. 261)).) The actions of his unit in the second half of April 1940 were also conducted with the intention of protecting civilians from German retaliation. According to Jacek Lombarski, blaming Hubal for German crimes is a "misunderstanding". In this context, he also critically evaluates the use of the term "Hubal pacifications".

Szymon Datner emphasized that in every European country, the struggle against German occupiers resulted in reprisals against the civilian population. However, he assessed that ceasing this struggle – and consequently allowing Nazism to triumph – would result in immeasurably more casualties. He added:

And in the case of Hubal, it must be remembered that his fight revealed and fully unleashed the potential inherent in the Germanic Nordics. He still had the right to assume that the non-combatants were protected by the Hague Convention and good military customs.

== Perpetrators ==
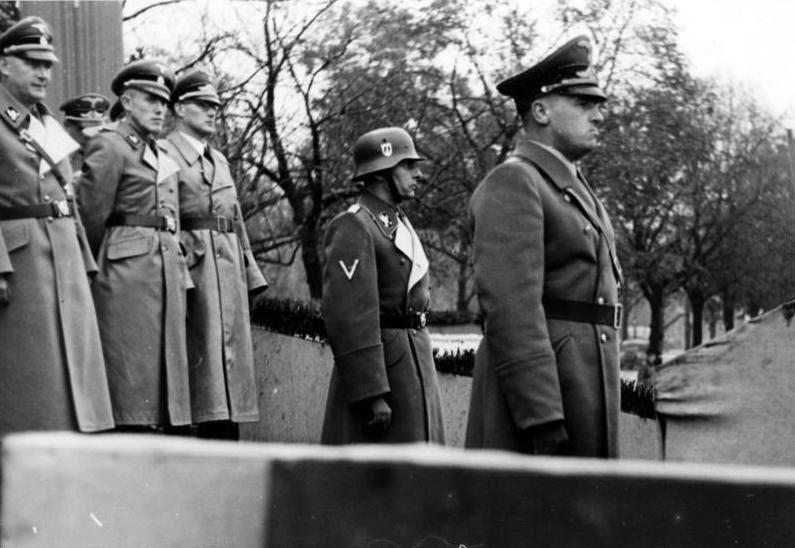
SS-Obergruppenführer Friedrich Wilhelm Krüger (second from the right, in a helmet) during a police parade in Kraków, 1939

According to the findings of the Main Commission for the Investigation of Nazi Crimes in Poland, the manhunt for Hubal’s unit and the reprisals against the civilian population were led by the SS and Police Leader in the General Government (HSSPF Ost), SS-Obergruppenführer Friedrich-Wilhelm Krüger, and the SS and Police Leader in the Radom District (SSPF Radom), SS-Oberführer Fritz Katzmann. Krüger personally commanded the failed attack on Hucisko and the pacification of Stefanków and ordered the massacre of the residents of Królewiec and other villages. Katzmann also took part in the operation against Hubal’s forces and, as SSPF Radom, bore responsibility for all crimes committed by SS and police units in the area under his jurisdiction. Krüger even credited Katzmann with the primary role in suppressing the "Polish armed uprising".

The Main Commission for the Investigation of Nazi Crimes' findings also indicate that the following participated directly or indirectly in the Hubal pacifications:

- The personal staffs of Krüger and Katzmann;
- The 8th and 11th SS-Totenkopfverbände regiments, as well as elements of the 1st SS Cavalry Regiment (1st SS-Totenkopf-Reiterstandarte). The participation of the 10th SS-Totenkopf regiment is also possible;
- The Radom Police Regiment, as well as the 51st, 104th, and 111th battalions of the Ordnungspolizei;
- Paramilitary Selbstschutz units – a company from the non-commissioned officer school in Kozienice, and four other companies composed of Volksdeutsche from the Kielce and Końskie areas;
- The police telephone operator company under HSSPF Ost and a liaison company from the National Socialist Motor Corps.

After 1960, materials concerning the Hubal pacifications were transferred by the Main Commission for the Investigation of Nazi Crimes to the Central Office of the State Justice Administrations for the Investigation of National Socialist Crimes in Ludwigsburg. In the 1970s, the Munich prosecutor's office identified the names of 285 living participants in the operation against Hubal’s unit, but no trial was ultimately initiated in the case. Based on an analysis of available documents, Andrzej Jankowski speculated that German investigators might have considered the actions of German units as at least partially consistent with the law of nations and deemed the participants in the repressive operation either incapable of standing trial or not subject to prosecution (for example, due to the fact they were following orders). (Note: The justification for the decision to discontinue the investigation conducted by the Munich I Public Prosecutor's Office stated that 257 Poles lost their lives during the operation against Hubal’s unit. This effectively dismissed the findings of the Main Commission for the Investigation of Nazi Crimes, which indicated that over 700 people were victims of the Hubal pacifications. The justification also suggested that at least some of the victims had directly participated in the fighting (Jankowski (2009, p. 194)).)

In May 2018, photographs from the album of a non-commissioned officer of the 51st Ordnungspolizei battalion appeared on an online auction site. The photos depicted, among other things, the pacification of Skłoby. Several images, including three taken in Skłoby, were purchased by Tomasz Kaleta and handed over to the Institute of National Remembrance.

=== German terminology ===
In the archives of the SD and Security Police Commander's Office for the Radom District, a folder containing 11 documents (reports, orders, interrogation protocols) related to the actions taken by the Germans against Hubal’s unit was found after the war. The title on the cover read: 203 Aktion gegen Hubal (203 Action against Hubal). None of the documents directly referred to the pacification actions.

In some Polish sources, the Hubal pacifications are sometimes referred to as Aktion Hubal.

== Commemoration ==
After the war, the remains of the victims of the Skłoby pacification were exhumed and reinterred at a newly established war cemetery. A monument – a pedestal with a five-meter wingspan – was also erected at the cemetery. The victims of the Hucisko pacification were buried in Ruski Bród, while those from the Adamów and Królewiec pacifications were laid to rest in Miedzierza.

Crosses, memorial plaques, and small monuments in honor of the victims of the Hubal pacifications have been erected in Gałki, Hucisko, Królewiec, Stefanków, and Szałas. There is also a plaque commemorating the victims of the Hucisko pacification at the entrance to the parish church in Ruski Bród. Additionally, at the cemetery in Radom's Firlej, there is a plaque honoring the victims of the execution on 4 April 1940.

== In culture ==
References to the crimes committed by the Germans in retaliation for the activities of Major Dobrzański's unit are included in the report Hubalczycy by Melchior Wańkowicz (part of the collection Wrzesień żagwiący).

Scenes depicting the pacification of a Polish village were featured in the 1973 film Hubal, directed by Bohdan Poręba.

== See also ==
- Pacification actions in German-occupied Poland

== Bibliography ==
- Czubryt-Borkowski, Czesław, ed. (1988). Przewodnik po upamiętnionych miejscach walk i męczeństwa. Lata wojny 1939–1945 [Guide to Memorialized Places of Battles and Martyrdom. The War Years 1939–1945] (in Polish). Warsaw: Sport i Turystyka. ISBN 83-217-2709-3.
- Datner, Szymon (13 May 1964). "203 Aktion gegen Hubal (niepublikowane materiały niemieckiej Policji Bezpieczeństwa w sprawie majora Hubala-Dobrzańskiego)" [203 Aktion Against Hubal (Unpublished Materials of the German Security Police Regarding Major Hubal-Dobrzański)]. Współczesność (in Polish). 162.
- Fajkowski, Józef (1972). Wieś w ogniu. Eksterminacja wsi polskiej w okresie okupacji hitlerowskiej [Village in Flames: The Extermination of Polish Villages During the Nazi Occupation] (in Polish). Warsaw: Ludowa Spółdzielnia Wydawnicza.
- Fajkowski, Józef; Religa, Jan (1981). Zbrodnie hitlerowskie na wsi polskiej 1939–1945 [Nazi Crimes in Polish Villages 1939–1945] (in Polish). Warsaw: Książka i Wiedza.
- Jacobmeyer, Wolfgang (1972). "Henryk Dobrzanski ("Hubal"). Ein biographischer Beitrag zu den Anfängen der polnischen Resistance im Zweiten Weltkrieg" [Henryk Dobrzanski ("Hubal"): A Biographical Contribution to the Beginnings of the Polish Resistance in World War II]. Vierteljahrshefte für Zeitgeschichte (in German). 20.
- Jankowski, Andrzej (2009). "Wieś polska na ziemiach okupowanych przez Niemcy w czasie II wojny światowej w postępowaniach karnych organów wymiaru sprawiedliwości RFN" [Polish Villages in Territories Occupied by Germany During World War II in Criminal Proceedings of the Justice Authorities of the Federal Republic of Germany]. Glaukopis (in Polish). 13–14. ISSN 1730-3419.
- Kacperski, Bogumił; Wroniszewski, Jan Zbigniew, eds. (2005). Końskie i powiat konecki 1939–1945. Cz. 2: "Mała wojna" majora Hubala [Końskie and Końskie County 1939–1945. Part 2: "The Little War" of Major Hubal] (in Polish). Końskie: Arslibris. ISBN 83-921135-2-7.
- Kosztyła, Zygmunt (1987). Oddział Wydzielony Wojska Polskiego Majora "Hubala" [Detached Unit of the Polish Army of Major "Hubal"] (in Polish). Warsaw: Wydawnictwo MON. ISBN 83-11-07345-7.
- Lombarski, Jacek (2011). Major Hubal. Legendy i mity [Major Hubal: Legends and Myths] (in Polish). Końskie.org.pl Krzysztof Woźniak. ISBN 978-83-929876-1-1.
- Porczek, Wiesław (2008). "216 mogił w Skłobach" [216 Graves in Skłoby]. In Durlej, Stanisław; Gmitruk, Janusz (eds.). Zbrodnie hitlerowskie na wsi polskiej w latach 1939–1945. Wspomnienia, pamiętniki i relacje [Nazi Crimes in Polish Villages from 1939 to 1945: Memories, Diaries, and Accounts] (in Polish). Kielce; Warsaw: Muzeum Historii Polskiego Ruchu Ludowego. ISBN 978-83-85953-43-2.
- Sawicki, Jacek (2015). "Hubal" i jego oddział wydzielony Wojska Polskiego 1939–1940 ["Hubal" and His Detached Unit of the Polish Army 1939–1940] (in Polish). Końskie: Edipresse-Kolekcje. ISBN 978-83-7989-369-0.
- Seidel, Robert (2006). Deutsche Besatzungspolitik in Polen. Der Distrikt Radom 1939–1945 [German Occupation Policy in Poland: The Radom District 1939–1945] (in German). Paderborn: Verlag Ferdinand Schöningh. ISBN 978-3-506-75628-2.
- Szymański, Marek (1999). Oddział majora "Hubala" [Major "Hubal's" Unit] (in Polish). Warsaw: Uwipal. ISBN 83-912237-0-1.
- Zaborowski, Jan (2011). Major Hubal i jego żołnierze [Major "Hubal" and His Soldiers] (in Polish). Tomaszów Mazowiecki: PAJ-PRESS. ISBN 978-83-931292-7-0.
- Zdziech, Henryk (1985). Pacyfikacja Stefankowa, Hucisk i Skłobów przez hitlerowców po bitwie z oddziałem WP mjra "Hubala", wiosna 1940 roku [Pacification of Stefanków, Hucisk, and Skłoby by the Nazis After the Battle with Major "Hubal's" Unit in Spring 1940] (PDF) (in Polish). Radom: ZBoWiD. Archived from the original (PDF) on 2019-08-22.
- Armia Krajowa w dokumentach [Home Army in Documents] (in Polish). Vol. I. Wrocław-Warsaw-Kraków-Gdańsk-Łódź: Ossolineum. 1990. ISBN 83-04-03629-0.
- "Terror hitlerowski na wsi kieleckiej. Wybór dokumentów źródłowych" [Nazi Terror in the Kielce Countryside: A Selection of Source Documents]. Rocznik Świętokrzyski (in Polish). XV. 1988. ISSN 0485-3261.
