= Execution in the Brzask Forest =

Mass execution of Polish citizens by the German occupiers

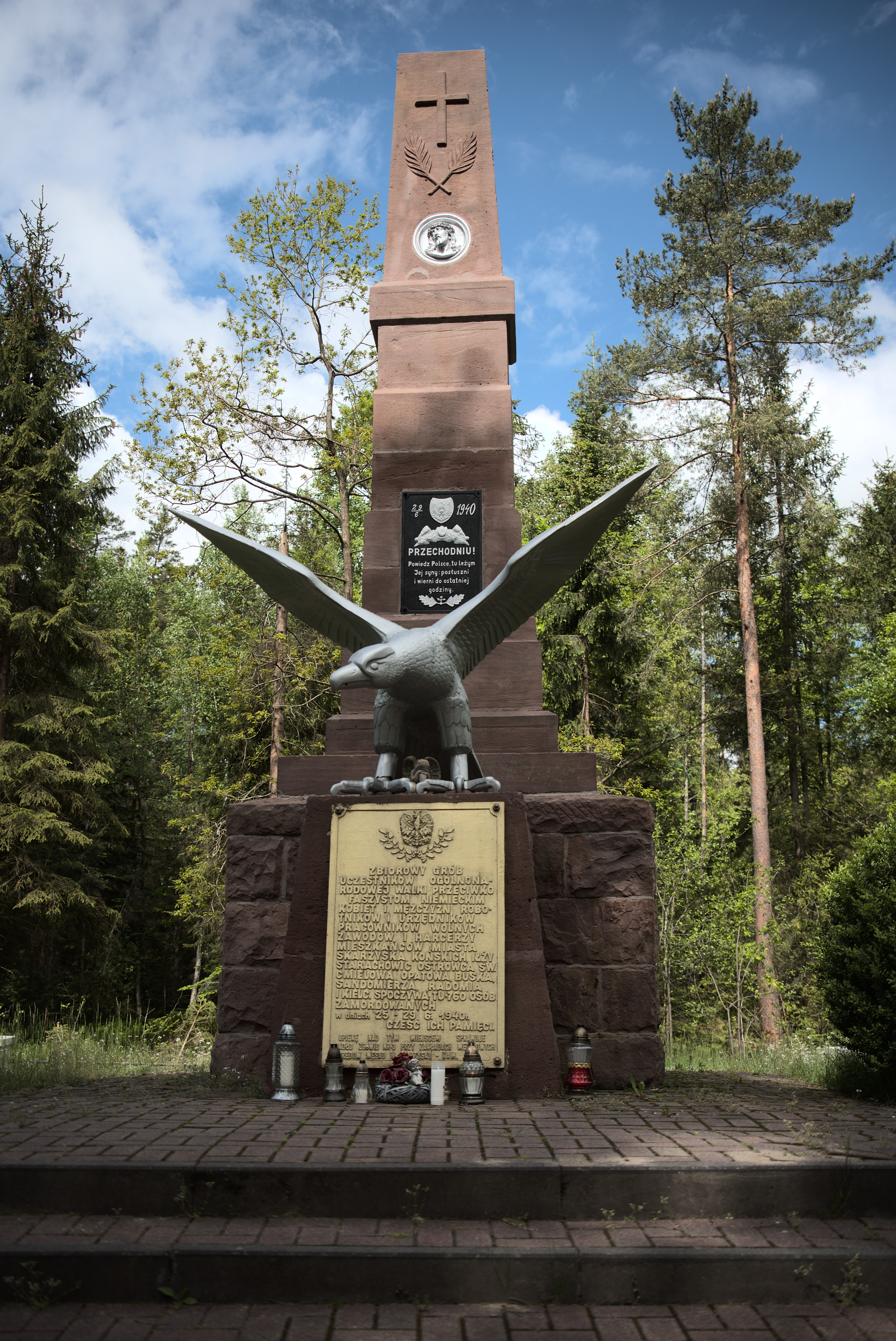
- View of the monument in the central part of the collective tomb at Brzask
- Location: 51°06′59″N 20°52′01″E; Brzask Forest, near Skarżysko-Kamienna, Poland
- Date: June 29, 1940
- Attack type: mass shooting
- Deaths: about 760 people
- Perpetrators: Schutzstaffel, Ordnungspolizei

Execution in the Brzask Forest was a mass execution of Polish citizens carried out by the German occupiers on 29 June 1940 in the Brzask Forest near Skarżysko-Kamienna.

During the all-day massacre, German SS officers and Ordnungspolizei executed approximately 760 people. Among the murdered were members of Polish underground organizations and representatives of the social and intellectual elite from the area of the pre-war Kielce Voivodeship, arrested as part of the so-called AB-Aktion. The crime at Brzask was the largest execution carried out in the Kielce Land during the German occupation.

== Skarżysko-Kamienna under German occupation ==
From the first days of the occupation, the German terror was primarily aimed at members of the Polish social and intellectual elites. According to the racist stereotype of Poles prevalent in the Third Reich, Nazi leaders believed that only the Polish intelligentsia possessed national consciousness, while the common people were concerned only with their daily existence and indifferent to the fate of the state. For this reason, it was assumed that the extermination of the so-called leadership class would destroy Polish national identity and transform Polish society into a passive, amorphous mass, which would serve, at best, as unskilled labor for the Third Reich. As part of the so-called Intelligenzaktion, carried out in the occupied Polish territories between September 1939 and the spring of 1940, the Germans murdered at least 100,000 Polish citizens. The extermination action was most deadly in the territories annexed to the Reich (Pomerania, Greater Poland, Upper Silesia).

In the first months of the occupation, mass reprisals against the Polish intelligentsia also took place in the territory of the so-called General Government. Among other actions, between 9 and 11 November 1939, "preventive" arrests were carried out in many cities of the Radom District, during which several hundred members of the local elite were detained. In Skarżysko-Kamienna, however, the largest repression action took place in the early months of 1940. Between January 29 and 10 February 1940, the Germans arrested around 420 people in the city, representing various social and political circles. After intense interrogations, nearly 360 of the arrested were executed in the suburban Bór Forest (from 12 to 14 February 1940). The pretext for the extermination action was the dismantling of local structures of the Organization of the White Eagle, but the real goal was likely the liquidation of the Polish social and intellectual elite in Skarżysko-Kamienna.

== Beginning of the AB-Aktion in the Radom District ==
In the spring of 1940, the Germans realized that despite the intensive extermination efforts carried out in all the districts of the General Government, Polish society had recovered from the shock of the September defeat, and the resistance movement was intensifying its activities. The start of the German offensive in the West diverted global public attention from events in Poland, so the authorities of the General Government decided to use this circumstance to conduct a large-scale terror operation – once again aimed at the Polish intelligentsia and social elites. On 16 May 1940, a conference was held in Kraków regarding "extraordinary measures necessary to ensure peace and order in the General Government", during which General Governor Hans Frank instructed SS-Brigadeführer Bruno Streckenbach, commander of the SD and Sicherheitspolizei in the General Government, to carry out an "extraordinary pacification action" (German: Außerordentliche Befriedungsaktion – AB). During another conference on 30 May 1940, Frank clarified that the goal of the AB-Aktion would be the "accelerated liquidation of the majority of rebellious politicians, resistance supporters, and other politically suspicious individuals in our hands, as well as simultaneously putting an end to traditional Polish crime". It was decided that those arrested would not be sent to concentration camps, but "liquidated on the spot in the simplest way". Streckenbach anticipated that at least 3,500 people, considered the "flower of the Polish intelligentsia and the resistance movement", would be murdered in the course of the AB-Aktion, along with several thousand criminals.

Starting from June 1940, raids and mass arrests were carried out in all cities of the Radom District. After brief stays in local prisons and detention centers, most of the arrested Poles were deported to concentration camps. In the first phase of the operation alone, nearly 1,000 people were transported to Sachsenhausen concentration camp. In August 1940, transports left local prisons for Buchenwald and Ravensbrück concentration camps. Many prisoners were also executed on the spot, usually based on sentences from a police summary court, chaired by the SD and Sicherheitspolizei commander in Radom, SS-Hauptsturmführer Fritz Liphardt.

Meanwhile, at the beginning of June, a special SS unit arrived in Skarżysko-Kamienna and set up headquarters in the building of the Primary School No. 1 on Stanisław Konarski Street. The school rooms were converted into quarters and prison cells. Mass arrests soon began in the city, with an estimated 200 people arrested. Additionally, Poles detained in other towns in the Radom District – such as Kielce, Starachowice, Sandomierz, Busko-Zdrój, Iłża, Opatów, Ostrowiec Świętokrzyski, and smaller towns from the counties of Iłża, Kielce, and Opatów – were brought to the school on Konarski Street. After some time, prisoners were also placed in rooms of the Bzina school, which the Germans had been using as a makeshift detention center since April 1940. The arrested Poles were subjected to harsh interrogations. Both schools were equipped with interrogation rooms where prisoners were tortured. Food was provided to the prisoners by an ad hoc civilian committee operating under the Polish Red Cross.

Historians have managed to identify only a small number of the arrested. It has been established that the prisoners at the school on Konarski Street came from various social backgrounds and towns. It is likely that peasants and workers predominated among them, though many intellectuals (especially teachers) and numerous forestry workers, as well as minors, were also among the arrested. The prisoners from Skarżysko-Kamienna were in the minority compared to those arrested from other towns in the Radom District.

== Course of the execution ==
On 28 June 1940, the Germans halted the interrogations of prisoners being conducted in Primary School No. 1. The detainees were individually escorted to one of the school rooms where a commission of about 10 SS men was stationed. There, each prisoner had to state their name and was then taken back to their cell without further questioning.

The following day, the arrested Poles were transported to the execution site in Brzask Forest, located about half a kilometer northeast of the village of Zagórze. Throughout the day, German trucks shuttled between Brzask and the school on Konarski Street. Groups of 20–30 prisoners were taken to the forest and shot over previously dug pits. Based on post-war exhumation results, historians estimate that approximately 760 Poles were executed in Brzask Forest on that day. Witness testimony indicated that the number of prisoners taken to their deaths from the school on Konarski Street on June 29 was smaller than the number of victims of the February massacre in Bór Forest. However, exhumation findings suggested that the number of Poles murdered in Brzask might have been as much as double the number of victims from the February execution. According to Andrzej Jankowski, this could mean that most of the victims of the June execution were brought to Brzask from the school in Bzina or other prisons in the Radom District. Unlike the February execution in Bór, the Germans made no pretense of legality, executing all detainees without court verdicts. The mass murder in Brzask was the largest execution carried out in the Kielce Land during the German occupation.

Andrzej Jankowski estimated that only about 40 prisoners from the school on Konarski Street avoided being executed in Brzask Forest. (Note: Some sources report that 31 condemned individuals were already on their way to the execution site when the truck transporting them was turned back (Mańkowski (1992, p. 69)).) These individuals were transported to the prison in Radom. On 4 July 1940, at Firlej in Radom, at least 23 people were executed, including numerous prisoners from Skarżysko-Kamienna and neighboring towns. However, most of the victims of this execution were residents of Skarżysko arrested in the winter of 1939–1940. (Note: Among the residents of Skarżysko-Kamienna murdered that day were Mayor Franciszek Tatkowski and Deputy Mayor Marian Maciejewski (Sikora & Gajewski (2009, pp. 19–24)).) By the end of August 1940, the remaining detainees from Skarżysko who were still held in the Radom prison were deported to Sachsenhausen and Buchenwald. (Note: Historians have managed to identify the names of six residents of Skarżysko who were deported to concentration camps and are known to have been arrested in June 1940 (Sikora & Gajewski (2009, pp. 19–24)).)

=== Victims ===
The Brzask Forest was not exclusively the site of executions under AB-Aktion. Among the murdered were individuals arrested earlier, suspected of involvement in resistance activities or of violating various orders issued by the occupiers. This latter group included 19 peasants from the village of Królewiec, imprisoned in April 1940 during a roundup targeting Major Hubal's unit. For this reason, Andrzej Jankowski suggested that the Germans intended to eliminate as many potential opponents as possible during this execution, including those detained in various jails and prisons across the Radom District.

The list of identified victims executed in the Brzask Forest includes 127 names. Among the murdered were, among others:

- Social and political activists – Marian Artomski (architect, member of the People's Party, member of the Organization of the White Eagle), Stanisław Krawczyński (gynecologist, director of the Holy Spirit Hospital Foundation in Sandomierz, member of the Sejm of the Republic of Poland from 1930 to 1939 representing the Nonpartisan Bloc for Cooperation with the Government and the Camp of National Unity), Wiktor Kwiatkowski (craftsman, Riflemen's Association commander in Starachowice), Kazimierz Wrona (scoutmaster from Opatów);
- Teachers – Henryk Biernacki (teacher from Starachowice), Stanisław Koziarski (gymnasium teacher in Opatów), Józef Nowak (teacher from Starachowice, sports instructor), Michał Pawlik (principal of an elementary school in Starachowice), Franciszek Szarzyński (gymnasium teacher in Opatów), Antoni Szwed (teacher from near Ostrowiec Świętokrzyski);
- Clerks – Bogusław Corn (Social Insurance Office clerk in Radom, member of the Organization of the White Eagle), Eugeniusz Henz (clerk from Skarżysko-Kamienna, Polish Scouting and Guiding Association activist), Karol Mąciwoda (clerk from Iłża), Kazimierz Sionek (clerk from Iłża), Henryk Zieliński (clerk from Warsaw, reserve second lieutenant, arrested in Sandomierz);
- Lawyers – Stanisław Cabaj (secretary in a notary's office in Skarżysko-Kamienna), Antoni Dec (court secretary in Opatów), Feliks Renner (notary from Iłża);
- Officers and soldiers of the Polish Armed Forces – Tadeusz Cichocki (military pilot, member of the Union of Armed Struggle), Jerzy Choma (lieutenant in the Polish Armed Forces, military training instructor, member of the Organization of the White Eagle), Zdzisław Lipiński (lieutenant in the Polish Armed Forces, engineer), Kazimierz Starewicz (captain in the Polish Armed Forces, military training commander for the Iłża district, member of the Organization of the White Eagle);
- Employees of the National Ammunition Factory in Skarżysko-Kamienna – Roman Bilski (technician at the National Ammunition Factory, reserve lieutenant), Wojciech Michnowski (pyrotechnician, foreman at the National Ammunition Factory);
- Entrepreneurs, craftsmen, professionals – Henryk Krzakowski (pharmacist from Opatów), Leon Rzepecki (painter from Opatów), Adam Szymański (merchant from Iłża), Marian Zaczyński (tanner, Polish State Railways worker, Polish Scouting and Guiding Association activist in Skarżysko-Kamienna).

== Aftermath ==
After the massacre, the SS unit left the school on Konarski Street. The janitors were ordered to tidy up the rooms and erase any traces that might indicate the building had been used to detain and torture Polish prisoners.

As early as July 1940, four local scouts from Skarżysko (Józef Cichosz, Jan Orzechowski, Władysław Wasilewski, Franciszek Cichosz) marked the boundaries of the mass grave in Brzask Forest and then cared for it almost until the end of the occupation. This made it possible, after the war, to locate the grave and honor the victims of German terror buried there.

After the war, a monument in the shape of an obelisk with an eagle sculpture was erected at the site of the mass grave in Brzask Forest. The monument has two plaques. The inscription on the first reads: "The mass grave of participants in the nationwide struggle against German fascists: women and men, workers and officials, professionals and scouts, residents of Skarżysko, Końskie, Iłża, Starachowice, Ostrowiec Świętokrzyski, Ćmielów, Opatów, Busko, Sandomierz, Radom, and Kielce. Here lie 760 people murdered between 25 and 29 June 1940. Honor their memory". The second plaque bears the inscription: "Traveler! Tell Poland, here lie her sons: obedient and loyal until the last hour".

== Responsibility of the perpetrators ==
The responsibility for actions carried out in the spring and summer of 1940 by the German security apparatus in the Radom District – including the execution in Brzask Forest – rests primarily with the then-Governor of the district, Karl Lasch, and the then-Commander of the SS and Ordnungspolizei in the Radom District, SS-Oberführer Fritz Katzmann. Lasch died under unclear circumstances in June 1942. Katzmann hid under a false name in Darmstadt, West Germany, until his death in 1957.

However, a particularly significant role in the extermination operation was played by SS-Hauptsturmführer Fritz Liphardt, who, as the head of the SD and Sicherheitspolizei in Radom, was personally responsible for implementing the AB-Aktion in the Radom District and also chaired the police court (Standgericht) that issued death sentences on Polish political prisoners. Liphardt committed suicide in 1947, shortly after his extradition to Poland.

== Bibliography ==
- Mańkowski, Zygmunt, ed. (1992). Ausserordentliche Befriedungsaktion 1940 – akcja AB na ziemiach polskich: materiały z sesji naukowej (6-7 listopada 1986 r.) [Extraordinary Pacification Action 1940 – AB Action in the Polish Territories: Materials from the Scientific Session (6-7 November 1986)] (in Polish). Warsaw: Zakład Historii Najnowszej Uniwersytetu Marii Skłodowskiej-Curie.
- Sikora, Tadeusz; Gajewski, Albert, eds. (2009). Kronika Orła Białego [Chronicle of the White Eagle] (in Polish). Skarżysko-Kamienna: Muzeum im. Orła Białego. ISBN 978-83-928714-0-8.
- Wardzyńska, Maria (2009). Był rok 1939. Operacja niemieckiej policji bezpieczeństwa w Polsce. Intelligenzaktion [It Was the Year 1939. The German Security Police Operation in Poland. Intelligenzaktion] (in Polish). Warsaw: Instytut Pamięci Narodowej. ISBN 978-83-7629-063-8.
