= Detached Unit of the Polish Army =

Branch of the Polish Army in World War II

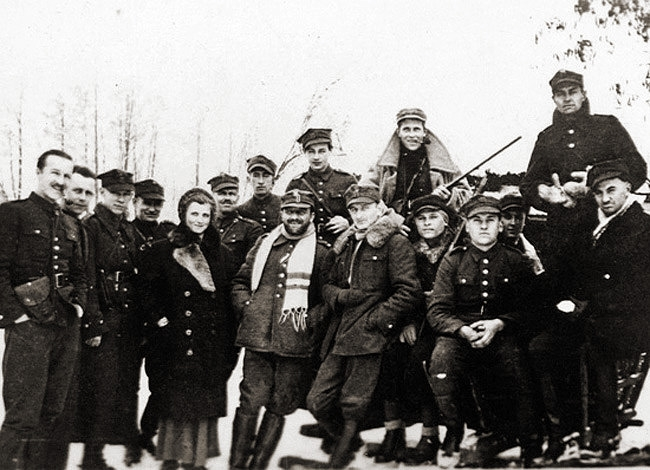
Hubal with his soldiers, winter of 1939/1940

The Detached Unit of the Polish Army or Separated Unit of the Polish Army (Polish: Oddział Wydzielony Wojska Polskiego) was one of the first Polish partisan units of World War II (and thus one of the first partisan units of the conflict). It operated in Poland's Kielce region and Holy Cross Mountains and was commanded by Major Henryk Dobrzański (also known by his nom-de-guerre, "Hubal"), and due to the prominence of its commander has also been commonly known as Hubal's Unit or the Hubal Partisans (Hubalczycy).

Paul Latawski writes that the unit's exploits had "some large successes against the German security forces" but led to "brutal reprisals" against local civilians. The Germans eventually destroyed the unit in the spring of 1940, "killing Dobrzański but creating a partisan legend".

== Operations ==
The unit was formed at the end of the German invasion of Poland at the end of September 1939 from elements of 110th Reserve Cavalry Regiment. It was commanded by Major Henryk Dobrzański, the 110th Regiment's vice commander. Dobrzański was also known under his nom-de-guerre, "Hubal", and so his unit became eventually known as the Hubal's Unit or The Hubal Partisans. Dobrzański, however, referred to his unit as a Detached Unit of the Polish Army (Oddział Wydzielony Wojska Polskiego), a term first recorded on September 24 when the unit was near the Woźnawieś village in the Podlasie region.

Hubal's initial intention was the aid in the defense of Warsaw, but the city capitulated in September 28 before his unit could reach it. Approximately 50 men out of 180 he had under his command that time volunteered to continue the fight. Then he decided to evacuate his troops via Hungary or Romania to France. On 1 October 1939 they crossed the Vistula near Łomża and started their march towards the Holy Cross Mountains. The next day his unit, previously avoiding engaging the German units, launched its first attack, when it successfully ambushed a bogged German convoy. After that he decided to stay in the Holy Cross Mountains area with his unit and wait until the Allied relief came. Hubal hoped to preserve and even increase a cadre of experienced soldiers which he hoped to expand into a larger force for the promised French and British counteroffensive which he was expecting to happen at any time. Around late October, his unit size had however decreased to a few dozen soldiers, as few as eleven according to one account, as some were dispatched on detached duty and many left, not willing to continue to fight.

Nonetheless, Hubal forces became the major element of the early Polish resistance in the Kielce region, growing from a few dozen men to 250 by December 1939 (although another account states that in 1939 the unit never exceeded a few dozen soldiers). The partisans were generally welcomed and supported by the local populace, and in fact Hubal had to decline a number of volunteers whom he concluded he could not train or feed. The unit operated in Kielce and Radom regions (including the Holy Cross Mountains and local forests) and had "some successes against the German security forces". In March 1940 the unit was reported to have over 320 soldiers. The existence of the unit became increasingly known to the German authorities, which in early 1940 started prioritizing its elimination. In late March, Friedrich-Wilhelm Krüger, then Higher SS and Police Leader for occupied Polish territories, gathered about 5,000 SS and police units in the Kielce region, in an attempt to destroy the Polish partisans. Due to internal politics, he did not inform the local Wehrmacht commanders of his plans. Having located the Hubal partisans, Polizei-Bataillon 51 was tasked with eliminating them, attacking their positions in the village of Hucisko on the night of 29 to 30 March (the battle of Hucisko), but this assault was repulsed and the partisans were able to retreat. The partisans, at that time numbering about 100, had 11 killed and 10 wounded, while the German forces, numbering several hundred, had about 100 casualties and lost six vehicles. Hubal decided that his forces had to disengage, and they were able to successfully do so over the next few days, despite several smaller skirmishes. German anti-partisan suppression operations in the region, known in the Polish historiography as the Hubal pacifications, resulted in the deaths of over 1,200 villagers and were the first example of Axis anti-partisan operations in World War II.

Hubal partisans were ambushed by the Germans near the village of Anielin near Opoczno on 30 April 1940. This was not a large skirmish, however, it resulted in two casualties, crucially including Hubal himself. Following Hubal's death in that incident, the unit became less active and disbanded on June 24–25 that year.

=== Relations with the Polish High Command ===
Hubal in forming his unit, or retaining command of some of his unit, refused an earlier order by the Polish High Command given after the Soviet invasion of Poland on September 17 to disband active military units and leave the country or capitulate. Subsequently, his unit operated at the time the Polish underground resistance was just forming. At first, it received tacit approval from the fledging leadership of the Service for Poland's Victory (later the Union of Armed Struggle), the first umbrella organization for Polish resistance. Later, however, the High Command asked him to disband or at least limit his operations, to avoid provoking the Germans into excessive violence against the local civilians (an order which Hubal did not acknowledge, an act that Stefan Rowecki, commander of Polish resistance at that time, considered court-martial worthy). Requests from the High Command did however result in a number of Hubal's partisans leaving the unit, with his permission, in early 1940. Polish resistance revised this policy and endorsed wide-scale partisan operations only around 1942, as the German occupation policies grew harsher over time.

== Legacy and significance ==
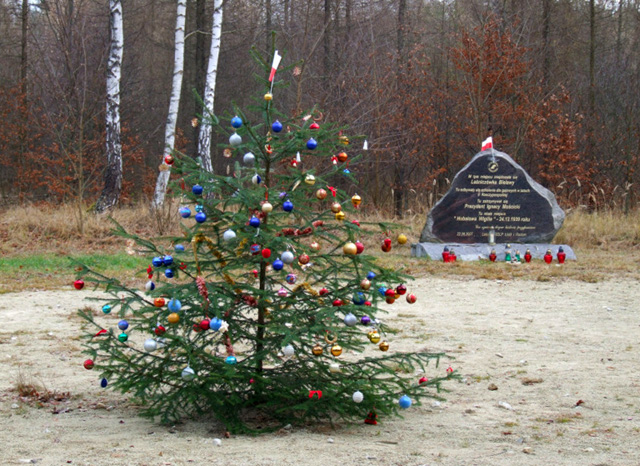
Christmas tree and monument in a location where Hubal Unit celebrated their Christmas Eve in 1939

Exploits of Dobrzański and his unit became a legend, and "Hubal" became the best known Polish partisan leader of the early war period. (Several similar units operated in the eastern regions of Poland invaded and occupied by the Soviets and fought against the Red Army, but their history is not as well known). The unit is also credited with being one of the first Polish partisan units of World War II (and hence one of the first partisans units of the conflict). The unit has also been described as the longest surviving and active unit of the Polish Army operating in Poland after the hostilities started.

Hubal and his unit have been a subject of a number of literary works, including Melchior Wańkowicz's Hubalczycy as early as 1946. The events were also portrayed in the film Hubal from 1973. Hubal has been described as Poland's last "Romantic Hero" and compared to figures such as Robin Hood, William Tell, Till Eulenspiegel and Davy Crockett.

== See also ==
- Holy Cross Mountains Brigade - another partisan unit operating in the same regions few years later
- Independent Operational Group Polesie - the regular unit of Polish Army recognized as participating in the last battle of the German invasion of Poland in early October 1939
