= Filipski =

Filipski is a surname. Notable people with the surname include:

- Gene Filipski (1931–1994), American football player
- Ryszard Filipski (1934–2021), Polish actor and director
