= Zamach stanu =

1980 film directed by Ryszard Filipski

- Directed by: Ryszard Filipski
- Written by: Ryszard Gontarz
- Cinematography: Jacek Stachlewski
- Edited by: Jerzy Pękalski
- Music by: Piotr Marczewski
- Release date: 1980
- Country: Poland
- Language: Polish

Zamach stanu is a 1980 historical film directed by Ryszard Filipski, written by Ryszard Gontarz.

== Production ==
The film was shot in Warsaw and Raducz.

== Plot summary ==
The film depicts the May Coup d'État carried out by Marshal Józef Piłsudski and his allies between 12 and 15 May 1926, as well as the aftermath of the coup—including political trials against Piłsudski's opponents.

== Cast ==
- Ryszard Filipski as marhsal Józef Piłsudski
- Ignacy Gogolewski as judge Klemens Hermanowski
- Andrzej Hrydzewicz as president Stanisław Wojciechowski
- Jerzy Sagan as prime minister Wincenty Witos
- Lech Bijałd as MP Herman Lieberman
- Tadeusz Janczar as MP Wojciech Korfanty
- Jerzy Moes as general Stanisław Haller
- Ryszard Dembiński as MP Stanisław Ballin
- Józef Nowak as priest Józef Panaś

Source.

== Awards ==
The film received Silver Lions award at the Polish Film Festival in Gdańsk in 1980.

== Television series ==
In 1985 a television series, also titled Zamach stanu, was produced; it was released in 1987.
