= Henryk Dobrzański =

Polish army commander (1897–1940)

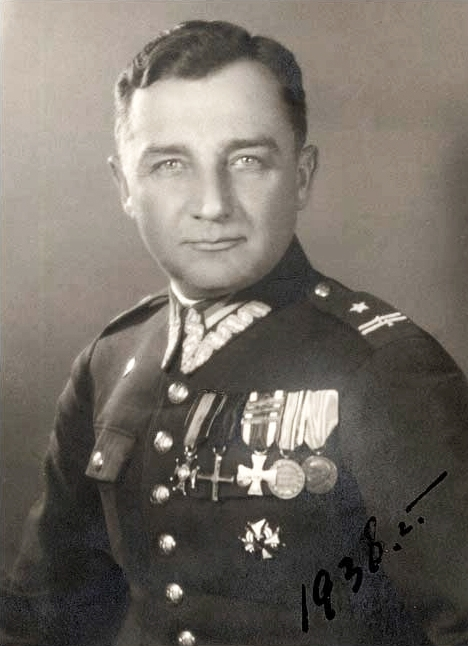
- Nickname: Hubal
- Born: 22 June 1897; Jasło, Austria-Hungary
- Died: 30 April 1940 (aged 42) Near Opoczno, Poland
- Allegiance: Second Polish Republic (1918–1939)
- Branch: Polish Army
- Service years: 1912–1940
- Rank: Major
- Conflicts: World War I Polish–Ukrainian; Polish–Bolshevik War; World War II
- Awards: Virtuti Militari (2); Krzyż Walecznych (4)

Major Henryk Dobrzański (22 June 1897 – 30 April 1940), also known by his nom-de-guerre "Hubal," was a Polish soldier, sportsman and partisan. He fought in the Polish Legions in World War I, Polish–Ukrainian War of 1918, the Polish–Bolshevik War of 1919–1921 and the Polish September Campaign of 1939. He is however best known as the leader of the partisan unit known as the Detached Unit of the Polish Army which operated in 1939 and early 1940 near Kielce.

Exploits of Dobrzański and his unit, considered the first partisans in Poland and arguably, of World War II, became a legend in Poland already during the war. Known as Hubal, he has been described as Poland's last "Romantic Hero" and compared to figures such as Robin Hood, William Tell, Till Eulenspiegel and Davy Crockett.

== Early life and career ==
Henryk Dobrzański was born on 22 June 1897 in Jasło, Austria-Hungary to a Polish noble family (Coat of arms of Leliwa), of Henryk Dobrzański de Hubal and Maria Dobrzańska née Lubieniecka. In 1912, he joined the pro-independence Polish Rifle Squads. When World War I broke out, he volunteered to join Józef Piłsudski's Polish Legions. He served with distinction in the 2nd Regiment of Uhlans and participated in many battles such as Stawczany and Battle of Rarańcza. In 1918 after Poland regained its independence, he joined the Polish Army.

Dobrzański took part in the Polish–Ukrainian War of 1918 and fought with his cavalry platoon during the Siege of Lwów. He participated in Polish–Bolshevik War of 1919–1921. For his bravery, he was awarded the Virtuti Militari, the highest Polish military award, and four times the Krzyż Walecznych, in addition to many other military awards.

After the Peace of Riga, he remained in the Polish Army. He became a member of the Polish equestrian team, winning many international competitions. He also took part in the 1928 Summer Olympics in Amsterdam and came fourth at the prestigious Aldershot competition. In his sports career, he gained 22 gold, three silver and four bronze medals altogether.

== World War II ==
Shortly before the 1939 Invasion of Poland he was assigned to the 110th Reserve Cavalry Regiment [pl] as a deputy commander. His unit was to enter combat as a second-line formation, but fast advances of the Wehrmacht made the completion of training impossible. On 11 September it was moved to Wołkowysk, from where it marched towards Grodno and Augustów Forest. It fought several skirmishes against the German army and after the Soviet invasion of Poland took part in the defense of the city against the Red Army.

After two days of heavy fighting against the numerically superior Soviets, on 20 September Grodno was lost and three days later gen. bryg. Wacław Przeździecki, the commander of the defense of the Grodno area, ordered all his troops to escape to neutral Lithuania. According to another account that order was given shortly after the Soviet invasion begun, around 17 or 18 September. In either, case, the 110th Regiment did not obey this order. The unit joined with the remnants of several routed regiments and fought its way towards the capital Warsaw. It got surrounded by the Red Army in the Biebrza river area and suffered serious casualties, but managed to break through the enemy defenses. After that, Lieutenant Colonel Jerzy Dąbrowski, the commander of the regiment, decided his unit should disband. A group of approximately 180 men wanted to continue, and Dobrzański took command of them and led them towards Warsaw, which was under siege. He named his force the "Detached Unit of the Polish Army" (Oddział Wydzielony Wojska Polskiego), a term first recorded on 24 September, when the unit was near the Woźnawieś village in the Podlasie region.

Warsaw capitulated on 27 September, before Dobrzański and his men were able to reach it. That left him faced with three choices: disband, evacuate (via Hungary or Romania) to France, or continue the fight. Approximately 50 men volunteered to continue the fight. He led his unit southwards to try to break out and reach France. On 1 October 1939 they crossed the Vistula near Dęblin and started their march towards the Holy Cross Mountains. The next day his unit, previously avoiding engaging the German units, launched its first attack, when it successfully ambushed a bogged German convoy. After that he decided to stay in the Kielce area with his unit and wait until the Allied relief came, which he expected in the spring of 1940. He also swore that he would not take off his uniform until after the war. On 6 October the Battle of Kock ended the resistance of the last major unit of the Polish Army. With the support of the local civilian population, Hubal and his men managed to evade the Germans for several months.

In March 1940 his unit inflicted heavy casualties on a number of German units in ambushes. The German authorities responded with reprisals against the civil population, burning several villages and killing an estimated 1200 civilians in what is known in the Polish historiography as the Hubal pacifications. Due to these reprisals local sentiment turned against Hubal's unit, and the newly formed ZWZ became concerned that this would inhibit their ability to recruit. The ZWZ and the Government Delegate's Office at Home ordered Hubal to disband his unit. He refused to do so.

== Death and legacy ==
On 30 April 1940 his staff quarters, in a ravine near the village of Anielin (near Opoczno), were ambushed. During the battle Dobrzański and one of his men were killed. The Germans desecrated his body and put it on public view in the local villages. They then transported it to Tomaszów Mazowiecki and either burnt it or buried it in an unknown location. The remnants of the "Detached Unit of the Polish Army" continued the struggle until 25 June 1940, when it was disbanded. The exact place of Hubal's burial remains uncertain, despite efforts to locate it.

Hubal and his unit have been a subject of a number of literary works, including Melchior Wańkowicz's Hubalczycy as early as 1946. Hubal has been described as Poland's last "Romantic Hero" and compared to figures such as Robin Hood, William Tell, Till Eulenspiegel and Davy Crockett.

In 1949 Dobrzański's son, Ludwik, emigrated to England and became a property developer. He died on 15 December 1990 in Bedford.

In 1966 Henryk Dobrzański was posthumously awarded the Golden Cross of the Virtuti Militari and promoted to colonel. Currently almost 200 organisations and institutions bear his name, including 82 Scouting groups, 31 schools and several military units. There are streets named after him in almost every Polish city.

In 1973 the film Hubal, based on his resistance campaign, was released.

The pseudonym "Hubal" comes from his family coat of arms.

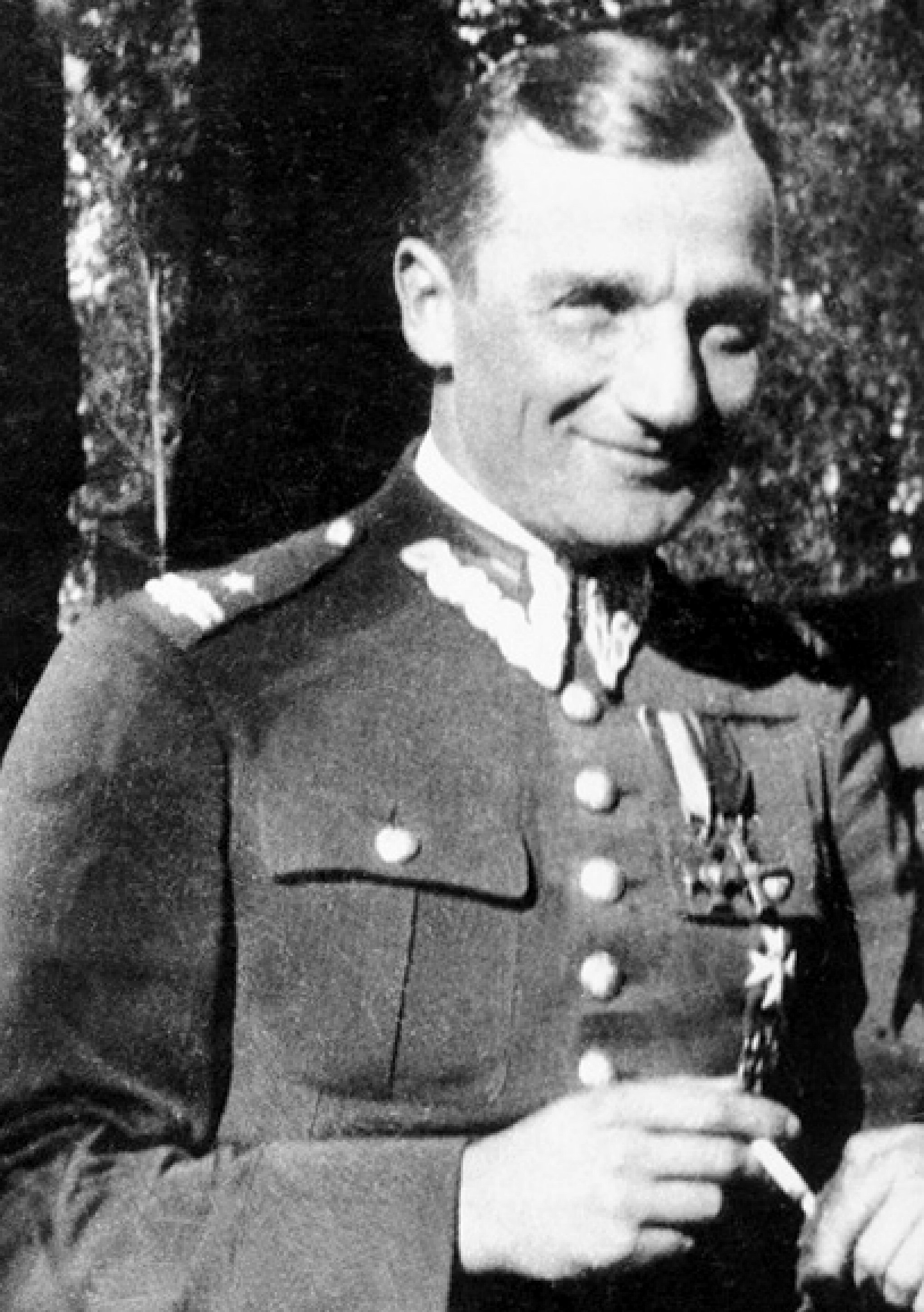
Hubal

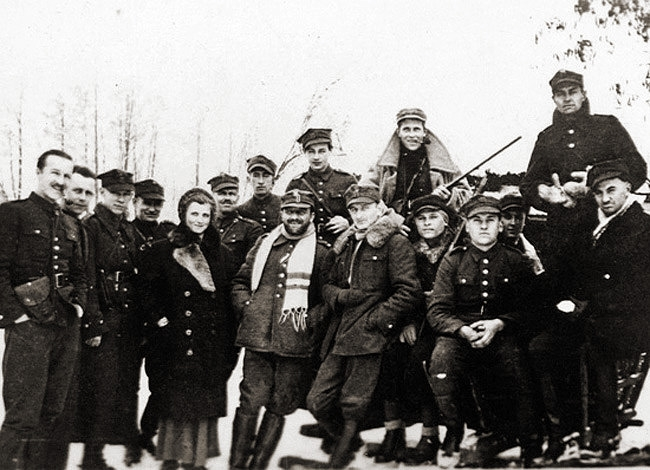
Hubal and his partisan unit, winter 1939

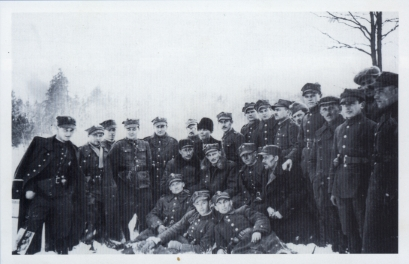
Hubal and his partisan unit, winter 1939

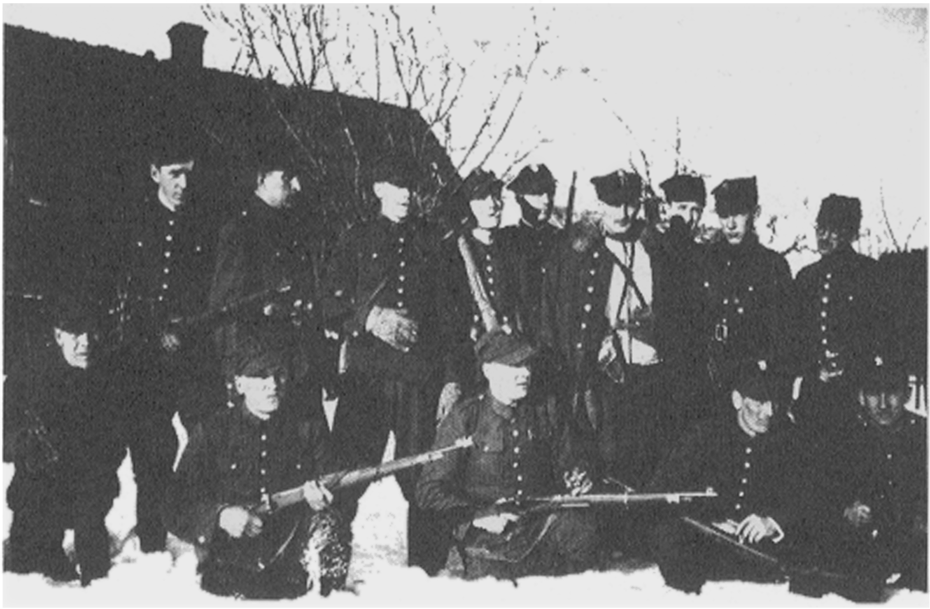
Hubal and his partisan unit, winter 1940

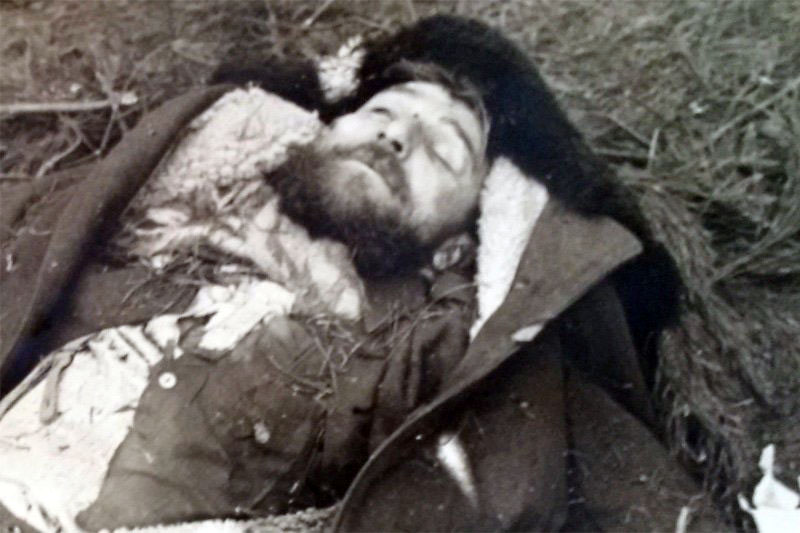
Hubal's body

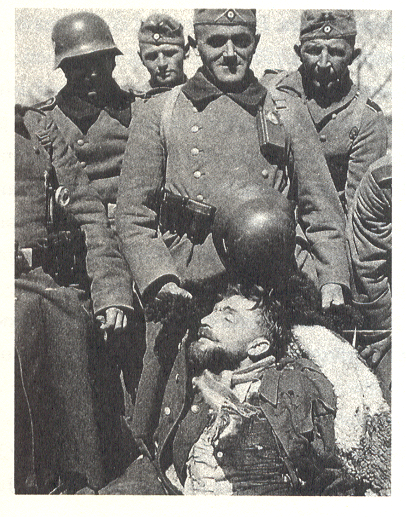
German soldiers with Hubal's body, 30 April 1940

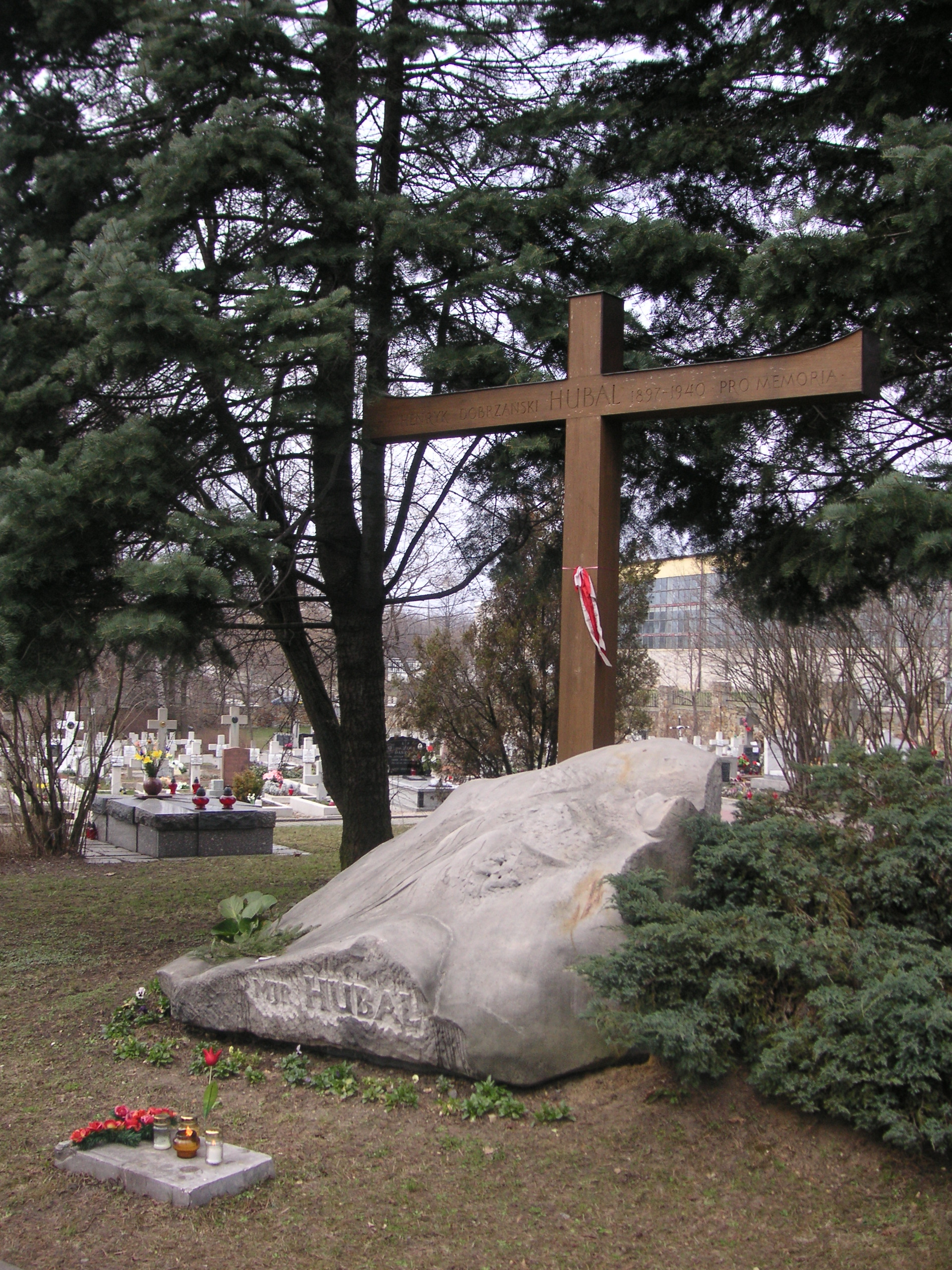
Memorial to Henryk Dobrzański in Kielce's old cemetery

Leliwa coat of arms

== Decorations ==
Military decorations awarded to Henyrk Dobrzański include:

- Order of Polonia Restituta Grand Cross (posthumously in 2010)
- Order Virtuti Militari Golden Cross (posthumously in 1966)
- Order Virtuti Militari Silver Cross
- Cross of Independence
- Cross of Valour 4 times
- Commemorative Medal for War of 1918–1921
- Medal of the 10th Anniversary of Independence

== See also ==
- Polish contribution to World War II
- Polish Secret State
- List of guerrillas
