= Paul Latawski =

British historian

Paul Chester Latawski (1954–present) is a British historian and writer associated with the Royal Military Academy Sandhurst, whose areas of expertise include military history and history of Poland.

He has been an author of several books and articles, and an editor of works such as The Reconstruction of Poland, 1914–23 (1992), Contemporary Nationalism in East Central Europe (1995) or Exile Armies (2005), together with Matthew Bennett, among others.

== Works ==
- Great Britain and the rebirth of Poland 1914–1918 (1986)
- The Security route to Europe: the Visegrad Four (1994)
- The Transformation of the Polish Armed Forces: Preparing for NATO (1999)
- The Kosovo Crisis and the Evolution of Post-Cold War European Security (2003), together with Martin A. Smith
- Falaise Pocket: defeating the German Army in Normandy (2004)
- The Inherent Tensions in Military Doctrine (2011)
