= Ryszard Filipski =

Polish actor and theatre and film director (1934–2021)

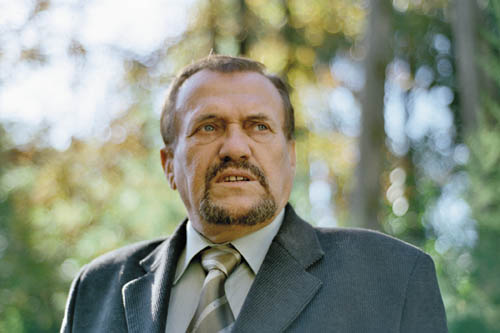
- Born: 17 July 1934; Lwów, Poland
- Died: 22 October 2021 (aged 87)
- Occupations: Actor, theatre and film director

Ryszard Filipski (17 July 1934 – 22 October 2021) was a Polish actor and theatre and film director.

He established the monodrama theatre Eref-66 in Kraków (1966–1981). Ryszard Filipski is known for Hubal (1973), Zamach stanu (1981) and other films. In 2003 he starred in the film An Ancient Tale: When the Sun Was a God under Jerzy Hoffman.

== Awards and honours ==
Filipski has received many awards, including:

- Knight's Cross of the Order of Polonia Restituta (1978)
- Gold Cross of Merit (1974)
- Bronze Badge of Janek Krasicki (1970)
- Gold Badge of Janek Krasicki (1976)
- Badge of Merit in Culture (1974)
- Gold Badge "for his contribution to Kraków" (1975)
