= Hubal (film) =

Polish film directed by Bohdan Poręba (1973)

- Directed by: Bohdan Poręba
- Written by: Jan Józef Szczepański
- Starring: Ryszard Filipski
- Cinematography: Tadeusz Wieżan
- Music by: Wojciech Kilar
- Production company: Wytwórnia Filmów Fabularnych (Łódź)
- Release date: 3 September 1973
- Running time: 126 minutes
- Country: Poland
- Language: Polish

Hubal is a Polish epic war film directed by Bohdan Poręba. It was released in 1973.

== History ==
According to the director's recollections, at the beginning of the 1970s, he was summoned to the Ministry of Culture, where he was presented with a ready-made script by Jan Józef Szczepański, at the same time offering to make a film. Bohdan Poręba accepted the offer, but he forced the removal of a few scenes (the commander's romance with a peasant woman and the execution of German prisoners of war). The finished film did not avoid censorship problems – the intention was to cut out a scene from the morning mass on Christmas, during which the hymn Boże, coś Polskę is chanted. The director avoided it thanks to the opinion of the Minister of National Defense, General Wojciech Jaruzelski, who succinctly praised the film after an improvised screening. The film has no scriptwriter in the lead, because Jan Józef Szczepański withdrew after the changes introduced by the director.

== Plot ==
Legendary Hubal – major Henryk Dobrzański, in spite of Nazi occupation in 1939 does not surrender and still fights with the enemy with a group of his faithful soldiers.

== Cast ==
- Ryszard Filipski as major Henryk Dobrzański "Hubal"
- Małgorzata Potocka as Marianna Cel "Tereska"
- Tadeusz Janczar as captain Maciej Kalenkiewicz "Kotwicz"
- Emil Karewicz as rittmeister Stanisław Sołtykiewicz
- Andrzej Kozak as Maruszewski
- Zygmunt Malanowicz as priest Ludwik Mucha
- Stanisław Niwiński
- Józef Nowak as colonel Leopold Okulicki "Miller"
- Tadeusz Schmidt
- Kazimierz Wichniarz as priest Edward Ptaszyński
- Jerzy Aleksander Braszka
- Henryk Giżycki
- Bolesław Idziak
- Jerzy Korsztyn

== Bibliography ==
- Maron, Marcin (2015). "„Hubal" Bohdana Poręby i „Pasja" Stanisława Różewicza – spór o romantyzm w kinie polskim lat 70". Kwartalnik Filmowy. 92: 123–140. Archived from the original on 31 July 2026.
