= Stefanków, Szydłowiec County =

Stefanków
- Village
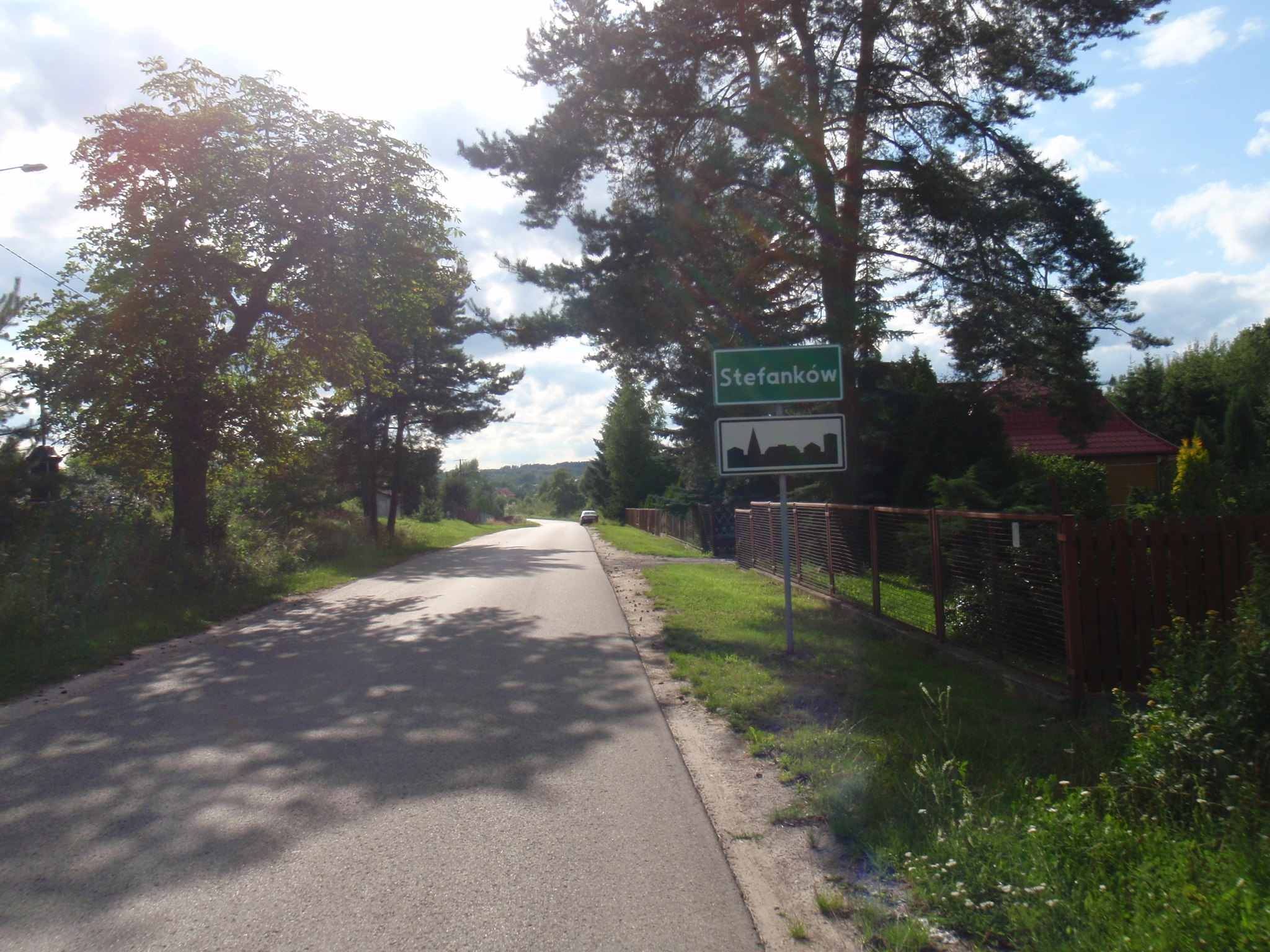
- Entrance to the village

- Location within Poland
- Coordinates: 51°15′20″N 20°42′46″E
- Country: Poland
- Voivodeship: Masovian
- County: Szydłowiec
- Gmina: Chlewiska
- Population: 184
- Time zone: UTC+1 (CET)
  - Summer (DST): UTC+2 (CEST)
- Vehicle registration: WSZ
- Primary airport: Radom Airport

Stefanków [stɛˈfaŋkuf] is a village in the administrative district of Gmina Chlewiska, within Szydłowiec County, Masovian Voivodeship, in east-central Poland.

== History ==
Within the Polish Kingdom, the village was administratively located in the Sandomierz Voivodeship in the Lesser Poland Province of the Polish Crown.

In 1827, it had a population of 101.

During the German occupation of Poland (World War II), on March 29, 1940, the Germans murdered 69 Poles from Stefanków in a massacre committed in the Firlej district in the city of Radom (see Nazi crimes against the Polish nation).
