= Szałas, Kielce County =

Szałas
- Village
- Location within Poland
- Coordinates: 51°3′13″N 20°38′35″E
- Country: Poland
- Voivodeship: Świętokrzyskie
- County: Kielce
- Gmina: Zagnańsk
- Population: 550

Szałas [ˈʂawas] is a village in the administrative district of Gmina Zagnańsk, within Kielce County, Świętokrzyskie Voivodeship, in south-central Poland. It lies approximately 9 km (6 mi) north of Zagnańsk and 19 km (12 mi) north of the regional capital Kielce.
