= Kamienna Wola, Gmina Stąporków =

Kamienna Wola
- Village
- Location within Poland
- Coordinates: 51°4′51″N 20°29′37″E
- Country: Poland
- Voivodeship: Świętokrzyskie
- County: Końskie
- Gmina: Stąporków
- Population: 220

Kamienna Wola [kaˈmjɛnna ˈvɔla] is a village in the administrative district of Gmina Stąporków, within Końskie County, Świętokrzyskie Voivodeship, in south-central Poland. It lies approximately 9 km (6 mi) south-west of Stąporków, 15 km (9 mi) south of Końskie, and 24 km (15 mi) north of the regional capital Kielce.
