= Hucisko, Przysucha County =

Hucisko
- Village
- Location within Poland
- Coordinates: 51°15′08″N 20°36′25″E
- Country: Poland
- Voivodeship: Masovian
- County: Przysucha
- Gmina: Przysucha

Hucisko [xuˈt͡ɕiskɔ] is a village in the administrative district of Gmina Przysucha, within Przysucha County, Masovian Voivodeship, in east-central Poland.

In 1940 it was the site of the battle between the Polish partisans of the Detached Unit of the Polish Army and German forces, which ended in Polish victory. Many civilians from the region were subject to the German repressions subsequently.
