= Podchyby =

- Village
- Location within Poland
- Coordinates: 51°2′38″N 20°31′22″E
- Country: Poland
- Voivodeship: Świętokrzyskie
- County: Kielce
- Gmina: Mniów
- Population: 89

Podchyby [pɔtˈxɨbɨ] is a village in the administrative district of Gmina Mniów, within Kielce County, Świętokrzyskie Voivodeship, in south-central Poland. It lies approximately 5 km (3 mi) north-east of Mniów and 19 km (12 mi) north of the regional capital Kielce.
