= Gałki, Gmina Gielniów =

Gałki
- Village
- Location within Poland
- Coordinates: 51°22′15″N 20°30′22″E
- Country: Poland
- Voivodeship: Masovian
- County: Przysucha
- Gmina: Gielniów

Gałki [ˈɡau̯ki] is a village in the administrative district of Gmina Gielniów, within Przysucha County, Masovian Voivodeship, in east-central Poland.
