= Anielin, Opoczno County =

Anielin
- Village
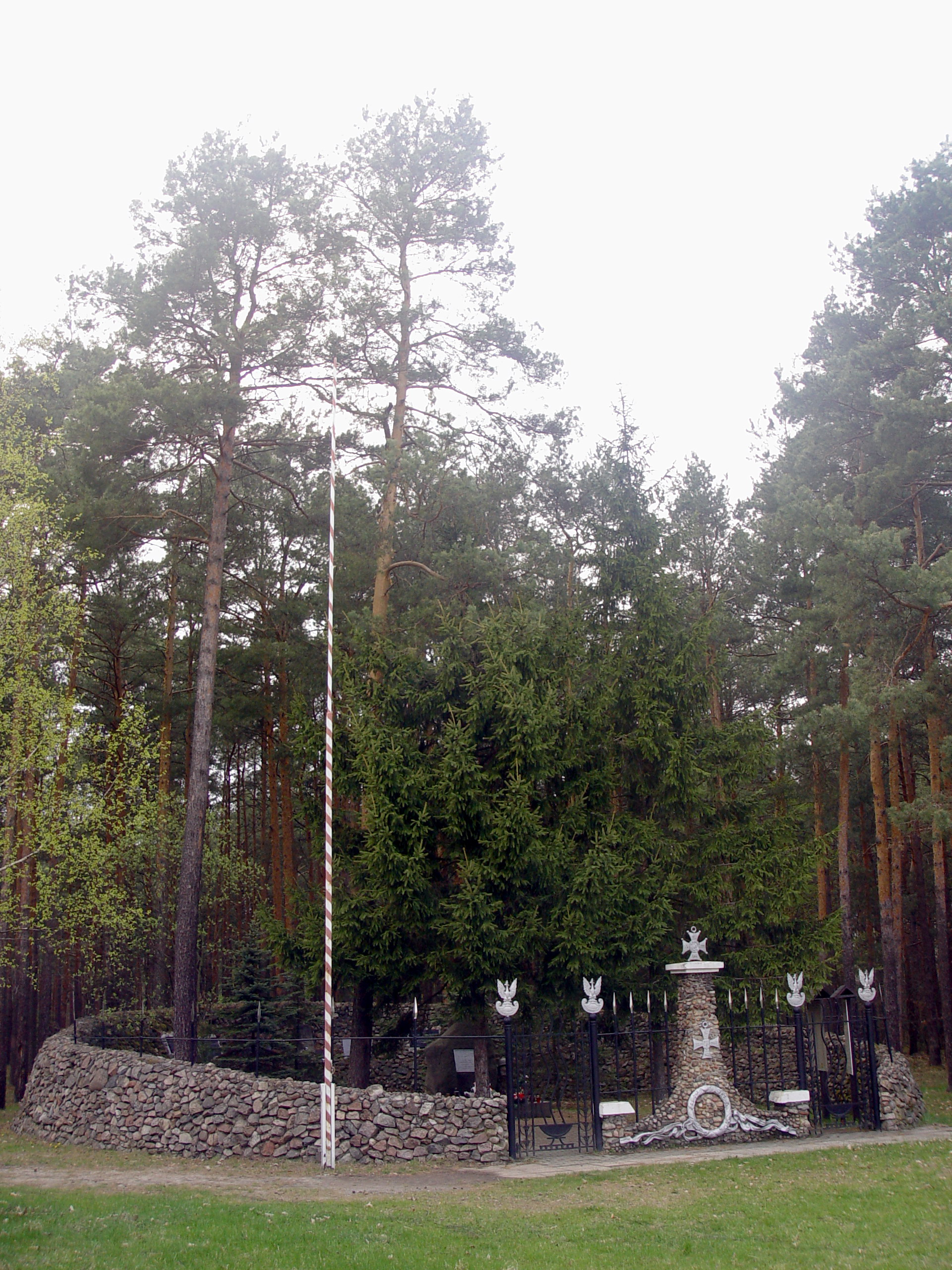

- Location within Poland
- Coordinates: 51°32′N 20°19′E
- Country: Poland
- Voivodeship: Łódź
- County: Opoczno
- Gmina: Poświętne

Anielin [aˈɲɛlin] is a village in the administrative district of Gmina Poświętne, within Opoczno County, Łódź Voivodeship, in central Poland.
