= Firlej, Radom =

District of the city of Radom, Poland

Firlej
- District of Radom
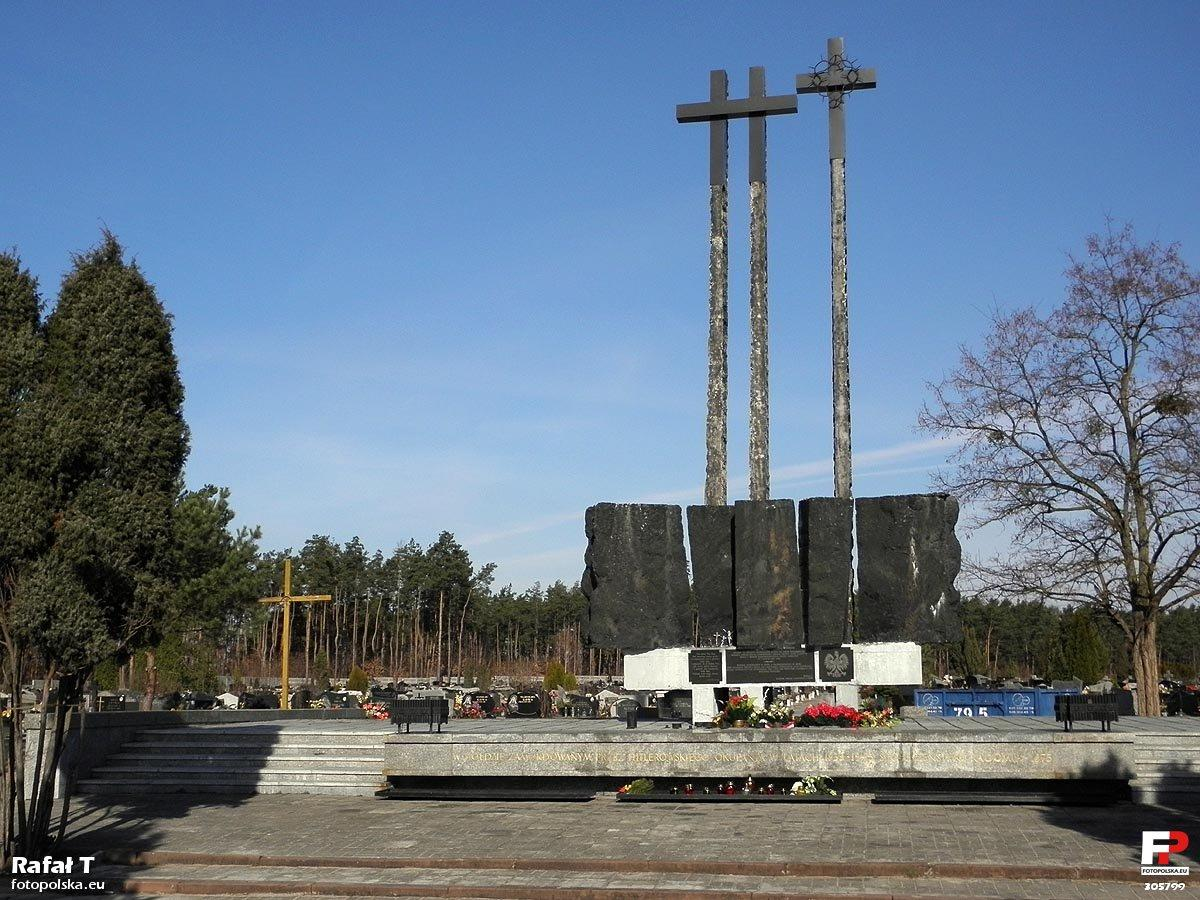
- Monument and cemetery in Firlej where the Germans murdered around 15,000 Poles and Jews during World War II

- Location within Poland
- Coordinates: 51°27′14″N 21°9′48″E
- Country: Poland
- Voivodeship: Masovian
- County/City: Radom
- Time zone: UTC+1 (CET)
  - Summer (DST): UTC+2 (CEST)
- Vehicle registration: WR

Firlej [ˈfirlɛi̯] is a district of Radom, Poland, located in the northern part of the city.

It is bordered by the districts of Wincentów in the north, Wólka Klwatecka in the west, Młynek Janiszewski, Jóżefów, Mleczna and Huta Józefowska in the south and Krzewień in the east.

== History ==
During the German occupation of Poland (World War II), Firlej was the site of German massacres of some 15,000 Poles and Jews. The first victims were Poles from Radom and other nearby villages, including teenagers, murdered in the spring of 1940. The last execution was carried out on 14 January 1945. The victims were the last remaining Poles from the local Nazi prison. Firlej was also the burial site for Poles murdered in public executions in Radom.

In 1974, the largest cemetery of Radom was founded in Firlej.
