= Fritz Katzmann =

German SS and Police Leader (1906–1957)

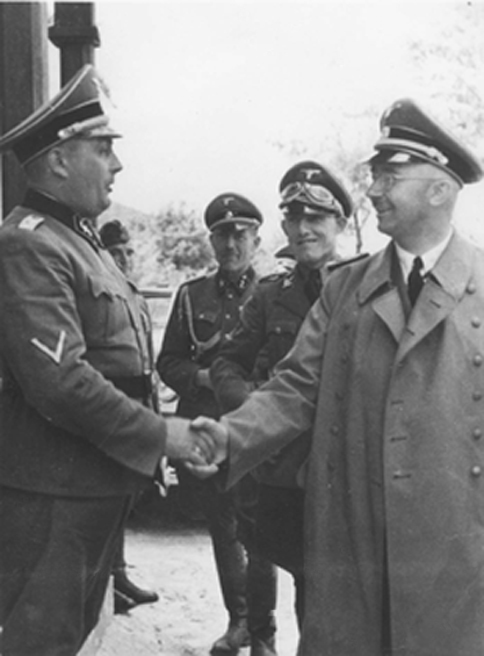
- Janowska concentration camp official visit. Right: Heinrich Himmler. Next to him: Fritz Katzmann. Left: camp commandant Friedrich Warzok
- Born: 6 May 1906; Langendreer, Bochum, Province of Westphalia, Kingdom of Prussia, German Empire
- Died: 19 September 1957 (aged 51); Darmstadt, West Germany
- Military career
- Allegiance: Nazi Germany
- Branch: Schutzstaffel
- Service years: 1930–1945
- Rank: SS-Gruppenführer and Generalleutnant of the Waffen-SS and Police
- Commands: SS and Police Leader, Radom District; District of Galicia; Higher SS and Police Leader, "Weichsel"
- Awards: War Merit Cross, 1st and 2nd class with Swords

Fritz Katzmann, also known as Friedrich Katzmann, (6 May 1906 – 19 September 1957) was a German SS and Police Leader during the Nazi era. He perpetrated genocide in the cities of Kattowitz (today, Katowice), Radom, Lemberg (today, Lviv), Danzig (today, Gdańsk), and across the Nazi occupied District of Galicia in the General Government during the Holocaust in Poland, making him a major figure during the Holocaust there.

Katzmann was responsible for many of the atrocities that were perpetrated by the SS during Operation Barbarossa. He personally directed the slaughter of between 55,000 and 65,000 Jews of Lemberg between 1941 and 1942, followed by mass deportations to death camps including Janowska (pictured). In 1943, Katzmann wrote a top-secret report summarizing Operation Reinhard in Galicia. The Katzmann Report is now considered a significant piece of evidence of the extermination process. He managed to escape prosecution after the war, living under a false identity.

== Early life and career ==
Born in Langendreer, the sixth son of a coal miner, Katzmann worked as a carpenter before he lost his job and joined the SA, the Nazi paramilitary organization, in December 1927. He joined the Nazi Party in September 1928 (membership number 98,528) and transferred from the SA to the SS on 1 July 1930 (membership number 3,065). His early entry into the Party would later result in him being awarded the Golden Party Badge.

Katzmann's career rapidly advanced: on 20 August 1931 he was commissioned as an SS-Untersturmführer and, on 1 December 1932, promoted to SS-Hauptsturmführer. Assigned first to the SS formation in Duisburg until August 1931, he led units of the 25th SS-Standarte "Ruhr," based in Essen until January 1934. He became an SS-Sturmbannführer on 20 April 1933, and was promoted to SS-Obersturmbannführer on 30 January 1934. Between February and April 1934, he held a staff position in SS-Oberabschnitt (Upper District) "West" in Düsseldorf. He married and became the commander of the 75th SS-Standarte “Widukind,” headquartered in Berlin, on 4 April 1934. Katzmann participated in the murders of the Night of the Long Knives and was promoted to SS-Standartenführer on 17 August 1934. On 21 March 1938, he was named commander of SS-Abschnitt (District) VI in Breslau (today, Wrocław) overseeing three SS-Standarten. He would be promoted to SS-Oberführer on 9 November 1938 and hold this command until 1 January 1942.

== Second World War and Holocaust ==
=== Poland ===
Following the invasion of Poland, Katzmann led Selbstschutz executioners during murder operations in Breslau, and in Kattowitz. On 30 November 1939 he became the first SS and Police Leader (SSPF) of occupied Radom. In the spring of 1940 he set up the Radom Ghetto for 32,000 Jews followed by wanton violence and plunder for personal gain. He was promoted to SS-Brigadeführer on 21 June 1941, and remained in command in Radom until 8 August 1941 when he was succeeded by SS-Brigadeführer Carl Oberg.

=== Soviet Union ===
After the conquest of western Ukraine in Operation Barbarossa, Katzmann was transferred to the post of SS and Police Leader for the District of Galicia on 8 August 1941 with headquarters in Lemberg, and on 26 September was promoted to Generalmajor of Police. In October 1941, he ordered Jews to work on building Durchgangsstrasse IV, a major military road from Lemberg to Stalino (today, Donetsk). Katzmann ordered the slaughter of 55,000–65,000 Jewish men, women and children in the same year. On his orders the Lviv Ghetto was formed in November 1941 resulting in relocation of some 80,000 Jews. He set up a kindergarten for ghetto children with cocoa and milk and secretly murdered them all in one outing. He organized transports to Belzec extermination camp as soon as the gassing operations started. By the end of 1942, the ghetto population was reduced from 120,000–140,000 inmates to 40,000. On 5–7 January 1943, 15,000 more Jews were murdered along with members of the Judenrat. Katzmann was promoted to SS-Gruppenführer and Generalleutnant of Police on 30 January 1943 and by midyear had produced a death toll of 143,000 more people in his district. On 30 June 1943, Katzmann delivered his leatherbound Katzmann Report to SS-Obergruppenführer Friedrich-Wilhelm Krüger, the Higher SS and Police Leader (HSSPF) Ost in occupied Kraków. The report documented the murder of 434,329 Jews, and Katzmann declared in it: “Galicia is Judenfrei!”

=== West Prussia ===
Katzmann remained in Lemberg until 20 April 1943, when he was transferred to Danzig to become the HSSPF "Weichsel" comprising Danzig-West Prussia, holding this command until the end of the war. There he oversaw the installation of gas chambers and crematoria at the Stutthof concentration camp. Katzmann brought Central and Eastern European collaborators auxiliaries with him.

On 1 July 1944, Katzmann was made a Generalleutnant of the Waffen-SS and tasked with the final liquidation of the Stutthof camp with all of its sub-camps, ahead of the Red Army advance. Gassing with Zyklon B had begun already in June. Until that point, Stutthof prisoners were considered important for German armaments production with Focke-Wulf workshop churning out airplane parts right at the main camp. Stutthof had 105 sub-camps located as far as Thorn (today, Toruń) and Elbing (today, Elbląg).

== Post-war disappearance ==
When Germany surrendered on 8 May 1945, Katzmann vanished. He lived in Darmstadt under the alias "Bruno Albrecht." His wife and five children never heard from him. He revealed his identity to a hospital priest chaplain shortly before his death on 19 September 1957.

== Decorations ==
- Golden Party Badge, number 98,582
- War Merit Cross, 1st and 2nd Class with Swords
- Honor Chevron of the Old Guard
- Sudetenland Medal

== See also ==
- German camps in occupied Poland during World War II
- List SS-Gruppenführer
- The Holocaust in occupied Poland
