= Skała Wyszków =

Interwar Jewish football club in Poland

RKS Skała Wyszków
- Full name: Robotniczy Klub Sportowy Skała Wyszków
- Short name: Skała
- Founded: 1928
- Folded: 1930s
- Region: Warsaw Voivodeship
- Based in: Wyszków
- Affiliation: CBŻ
- Members: 200

Robotniczy Klub Sportowy „Skała" (transl. Workers Sport Club "Rock", abbreviated RKS) was a Jewish Communist sports organization in Wyszków, Poland, active during the interbellum years. Founded in 1928, RKS was one of two Jewish sports organizations in the city (the other being Makabi Wyszków). The club had a football team.

RKS had initially appealed to Jewish workers across party lines, with the slogan that "...if you are a worker, you belong in this club". However, the political unity was short-lived, as the communists seized control of the club. Just a few weeks after its foundation, the Poale Zion followers split away and established a third Jewish sports organization in the city, named Gwiazda Wyszków.

RKS had more than 200 members (100 men, 70 women and 40 children). Its members were largely from the Jewish Section of the Communist Party. However, there were also some unaffiliated workers who remained as members of the club.
