= History of the Jews in Szydłowiec =

History of Jews in Szydłowiec refers to the history of the Jewish religious community in Szydłowiec from the earliest mention of Jews in the town in the 16th century to 1946.

The Jews of Szydłowiec formed a close-knit community within their own religious and ethnic group, carefully isolating themselves from the town's Catholic and Protestant residents until the end of the 18th century. They began arriving in large numbers in the second half of the 17th century. In the 19th and early 20th centuries, they established a thriving civic community that had a significant influence on local government decisions and the political landscape of the Radom Land. Before World War II, Jewish residents made up 76% of the town's population. They mainly lived in the northern part of the town – Praga, Skałka, and Główne Miasto. The once harmonious coexistence of Poles and Jews in Szydłowiec was ultimately disrupted by the war and the wave of postwar antisemitism.

At the same time, Jews from Szydłowiec left a lasting impact on the local folk culture. This influence is reflected, among other things, in the pejorative ethnonym for the town's inhabitants: "Cebularze" (regional dialect: Cybulo(a)rze).

== Polish–Lithuanian Commonwealth (16th–18th century) ==
=== Settlement ===
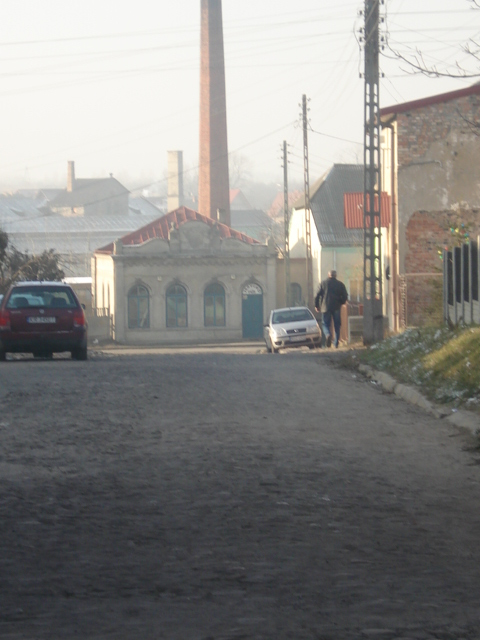
Garbarska Synagogue

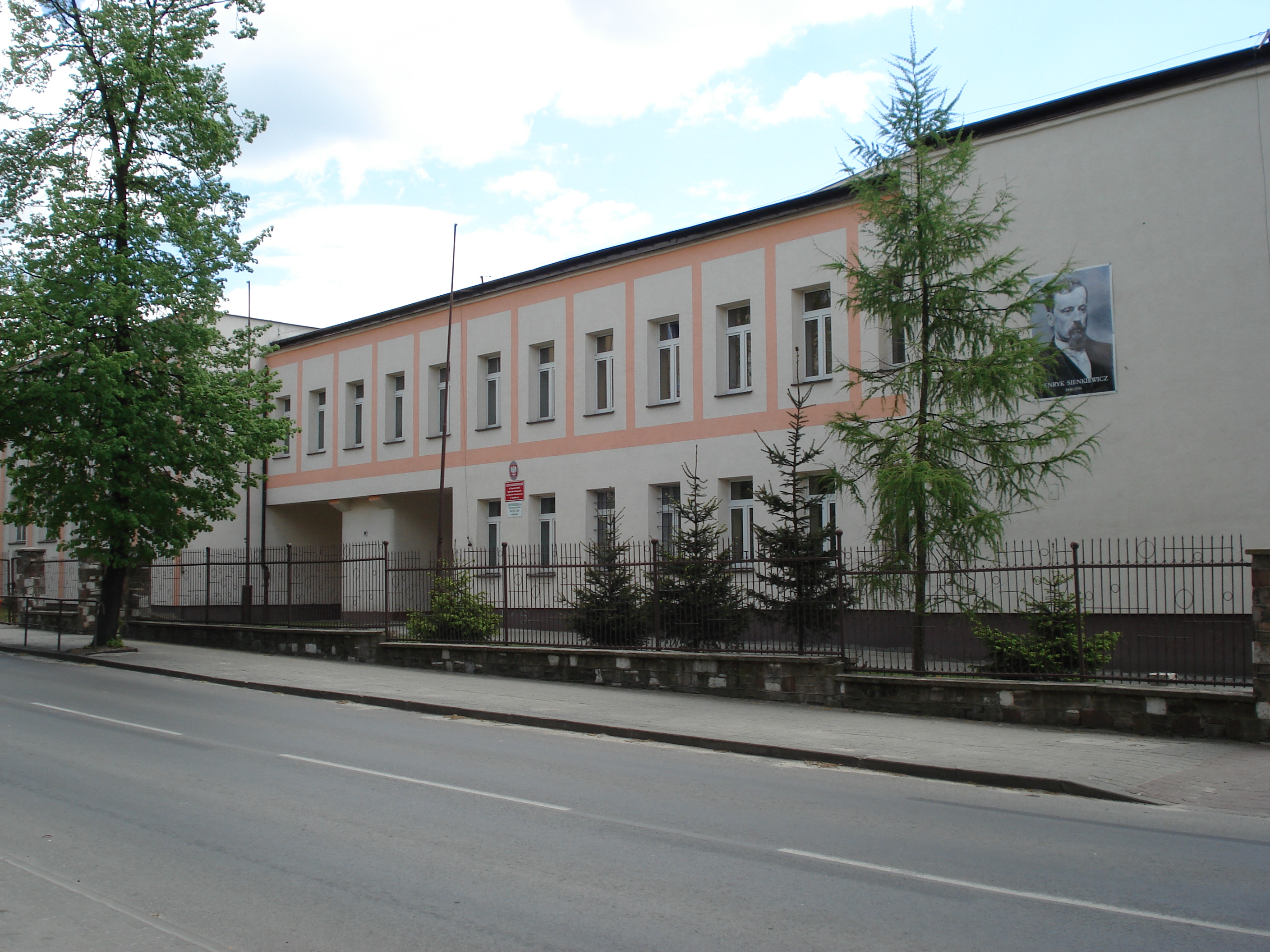
H. Sienkiewicz Secondary School. The Main Synagogue with a cemetery stood here

Jews appeared in Szydłowiec in the 1580s. Sparse mentions, despite the survival of municipal archives, suggest that the Jewish community had little significance in the town until the mid-17th century. The first purchases of town property by Jews were recorded in 1589. The first documented Jewish residents of Szydłowiec were Przasnisz and Abram Sowa.

Two hypotheses exist regarding the mass influx of Jews into Szydłowiec. The first suggests that they came from Red Ruthenia and Volhynia, fleeing the Khmelnytsky Uprising. This remains speculative, as the author of this theory provides no supporting evidence. The second hypothesis posits that the Jewish population of Szydłowiec was affected by the privileges granted by King John II Casimir Vasa in 1663 and John III Sobieski in 1676. This is also incorrect, as these privileges pertain to Szydłów, not Szydłowiec. The records of the head tax from between 1672 and 1676 do not mention Jews in Szydłowiec. However, the mass influx of Jews into Szydłowiec should be linked to the 1696 decree issued by Dominik Mikołaj Radziwiłł, prompted by the depopulation of the town. The owner of the Szydłowiec estates assured that there were plenty of vacant houses and plots for building in the town, encouraging settlement and guaranteeing the safety of newly acquired property. This decree also confirmed old municipal rights and privileges and encouraged merchants to visit Szydłowiec's fairs and settle in the town.

By the early 18th century, the Jewish population in Szydłowiec must have been significant, as the town's owner, rather than the Jewish elders, sought permission from the Bishop of Kraków, Kazimierz Łubieński, to build a synagogue in 1711. This was eventually constructed in the same year, enabling the formation of a religious community. The number of Jews in the town grew so rapidly that the northern part of Szydłowiec was soon referred to as the "Jewish town". By 1716, there were 20 Jewish householders and 25 tenants in the town. According to Jacek Wijaczka, by this year there were 270 Jews living in Szydłowiec.

=== Relations between Jews and Christians ===
From the mid-18th century, Jews in Szydłowiec began to play an increasingly significant role. One of the Jews, Gershon Salmonowicz, obtained the lease for municipal revenues between 1726 and 1727. The next co-leaseholder was Mosiek Dawidowicz.

With the growing Jewish population, conflicts began to arise between Catholics and the increasingly numerous Jewish inhabitants. These were primarily economic conflicts. The Jewish Community, feeling aggrieved, submitted a complaint to the town's owner, listing their grievances. After reading it, Prince Leon Michał Radziwiłł concluded that the Szydłowiec synagogue, as well as the town itself, might come to ruin. Therefore, on 5 September 1741, he issued a decree regulating the disputed issues. Among other things, he stated that since the Jews did not go to the forest to gather wood but instead bought it in the town, they should not be subjected to forest-related fees. He further declared, "Only by my old universal decree, I pull them to this duty; thus, even though I annul oats and chickens, I order that the Catholic town should annually pay 100 Polish złoty without any delays".

The prince also sought to prevent anti-Jewish acts. These incidents usually occurred during the Maundy Thursday procession when participants engaged in acts of violence against Jewish property and the Jews themselves. As a result, the town owner ordered the council to deploy a guard during the procession to prevent any disturbances. The governor of the county was also obligated to deploy a castle garrison to capture the perpetrators of such crimes. Both Christians and Jews were bound by the decree. Violation of it was punishable by a fine of 200 grzywna, and failure to comply with this penalty could result in two weeks of imprisonment and an additional fine of 400 grzywna.

== Congress Poland (1815–1914) ==
Jewish Population of Szydłowiec between 1819 and 1913
Year	Number	% of total population
1819	1,477	62.2%
1825	1,816	63.6%
1827	2,049	64.8%
1857	2,780	73.2%
1860	2,969	74.4%
1862	2,961	73.6%
1897	5,298	71.3%
1906	6,244	75.6%
1913	8,563	78.2%

=== Area of residence ===
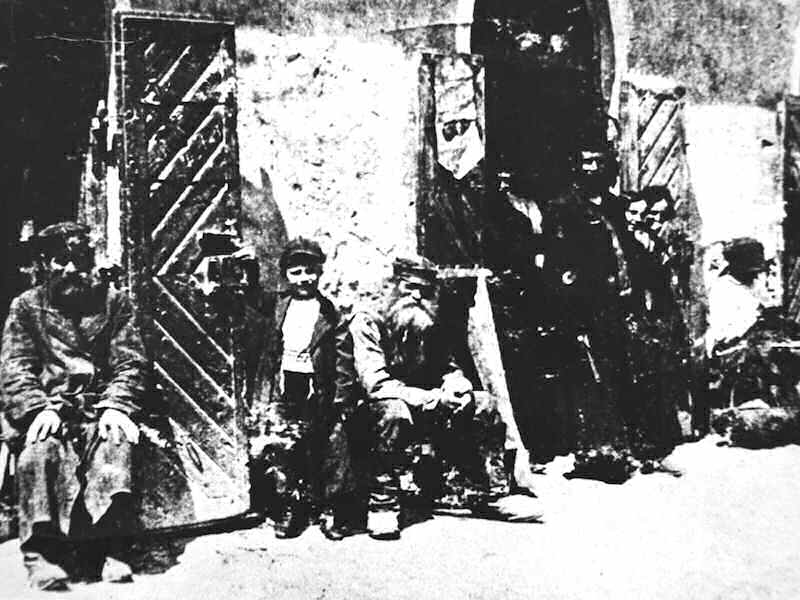
Residents of the Jewish Market

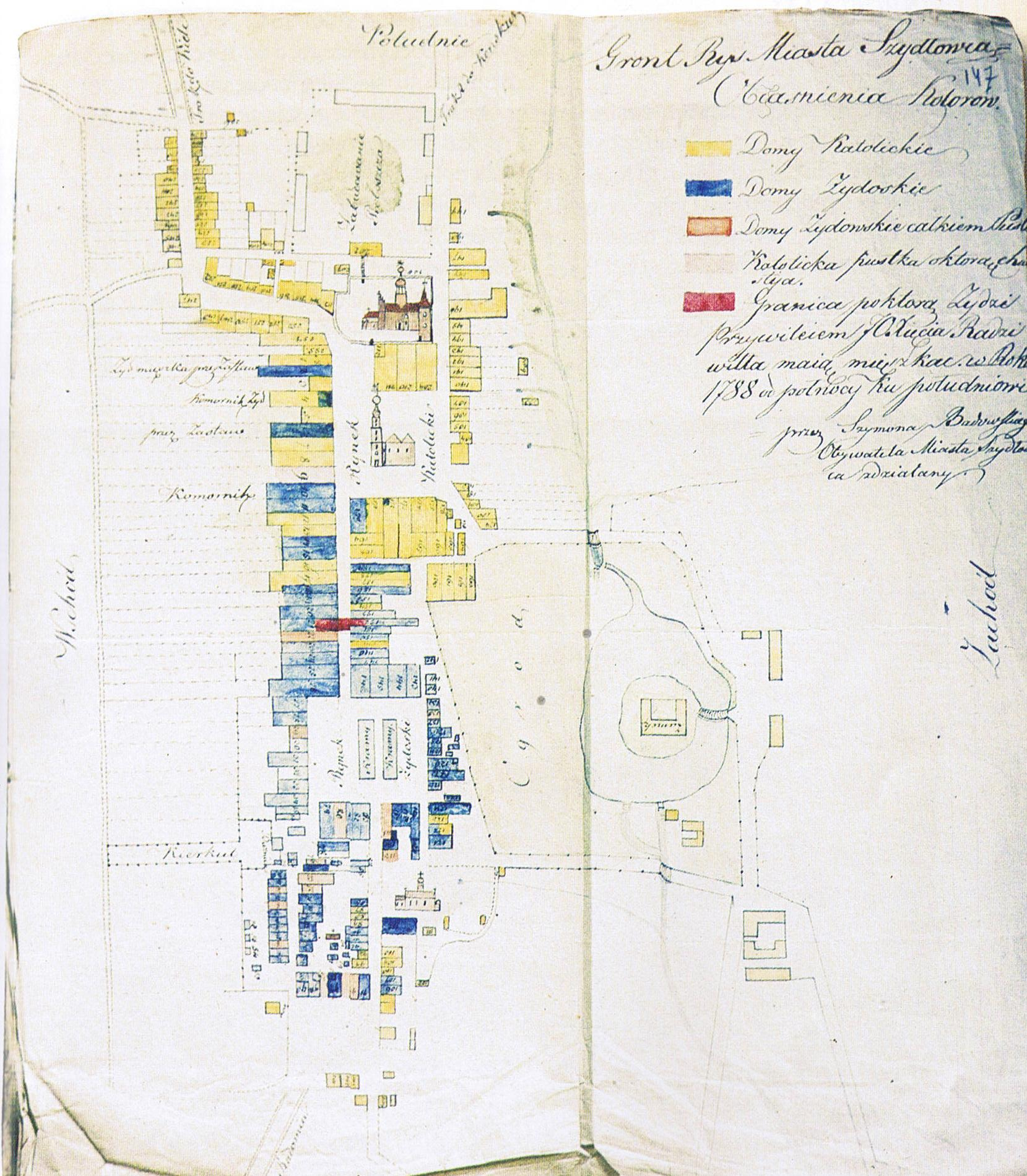
Map of Szydłowiec from 1820; the blue color marks the houses inhabited by Jews, while the red line indicates the boundary between the Jewish and Catholic districts

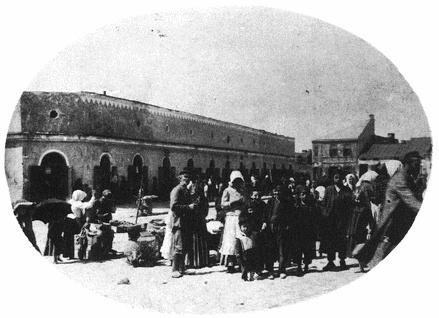
Stalls at the Jewish Market (1914)

Since the 16th century, Szydłowiec was divided into two districts: the Catholic Town and the Jewish Town. The latter included areas around Skałeczny Square. This division remained in place until 1862, with its legal origins dating back to 28 July 1788, when Prince Mikołaj Radziwiłł issued a privilege for Szydłowiec. It stated that Jews should not settle or live in the area designated for Catholics under any circumstances.

At the beginning of the 19th century, this law was violated. Jews settled in several houses near the Great Market. This caused protests from the Catholic residents, who demanded the return to the previous state. The judge of the Peace Court, Filip Piegłowski, appointed by the city owner, referred to the 1788 privilege and ordered the removal of Jews from the Market. This took place on 19 July 1820. It was at this time that, at the initiative of Catholic townspeople, Szymon Badowski created a city plan, marking public utility buildings (including those belonging to the Jewish community) and also the boundary established by Mikołaj Radziwiłł's privilege.

In 1860, a population census was conducted in the town, revealing that Jews had already settled on a new street, Zgnila Street. At this time, only one Jew lived in the Catholic Market. This situation remained until 1862 when the privilege granted by the Radziwiłłs ceased to apply, as the tsar abolished the restrictions on Jewish mobility. This indicates that the residents of Szydłowiec, especially Catholics, adhered to this prohibition, which was not such a common occurrence in the Congress Poland at that time.

=== Religious community and life ===
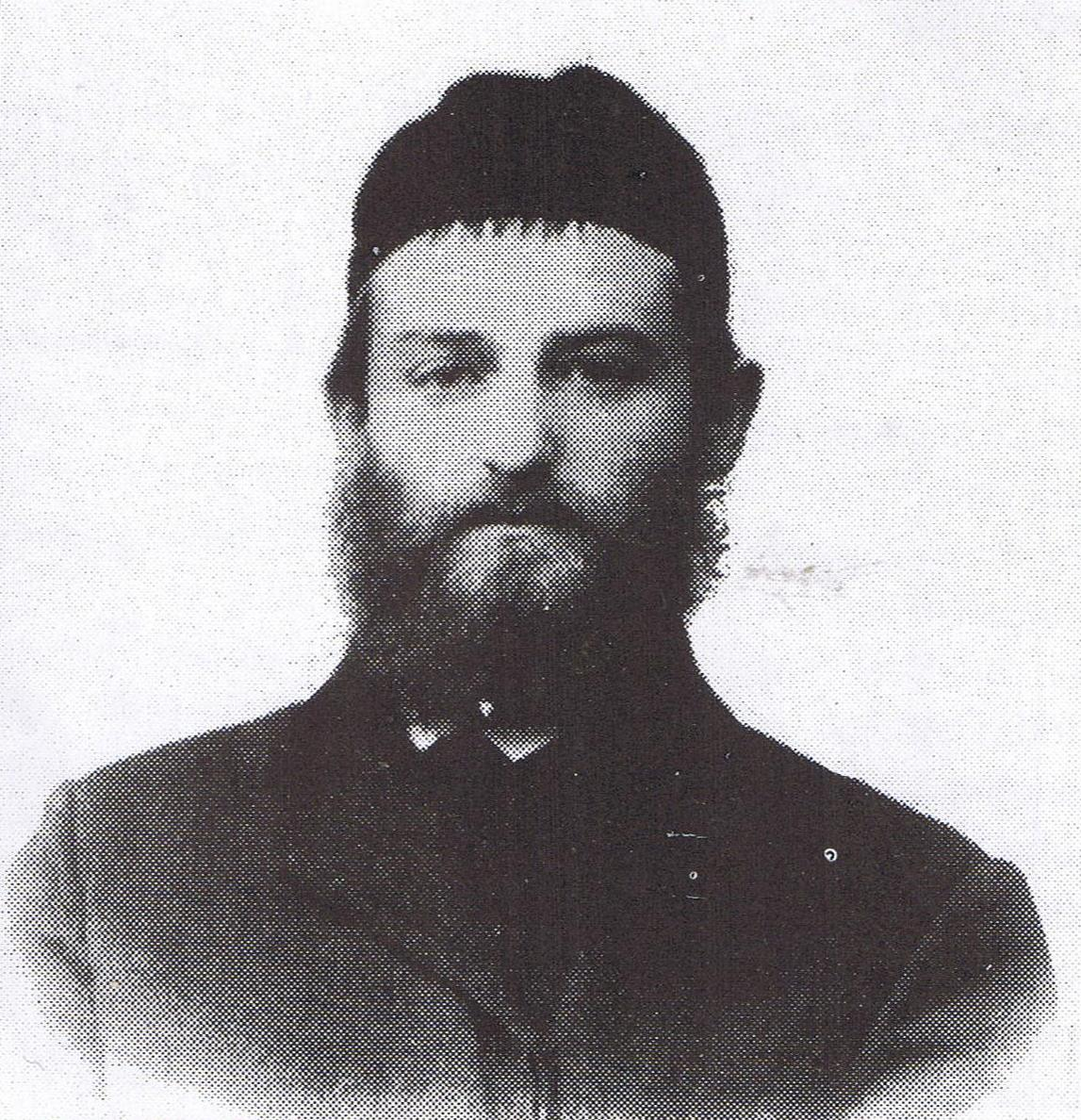
Rubin Rabinowicz – Rabbi of Szydłowiec

During this period, the Szydłowiec Jewish community was one of the largest in the Radom Governorate. This was partly due to territorial mobility restrictions. Until 1861, the Szydłowiec community included the following towns: Bliżyn, Bodzentyn, Broniew, Chlewiska, Chustki, Długosz, Dąbrowa, Kamienna, Psary, Suchedniów, Śniadków, Tarczek, Wąchock, Wola Korzeniowska, Wygoda, Wymysłów, and Wzdół. In 1862, the area of the religious community was reduced due to the establishment of new communities in Bodzentyn, Kamienna, and Wąchock. Apart from the synagogue, the community also had a cheder, mikveh, school, and two cemeteries. This situation remained unchanged until the outbreak of World War I, indicating its independence.

During this period, the community employed a rabbi, assistant rabbi, cheder teacher, treasurer, synagogue caretaker, and bookkeeper. The latter three positions were likely filled by Poles, as was common in other communities in the governorate. This was due to the need for knowledge of the law, as well as the ability to speak Polish and Russian.

At this time, the only source of income for the community was the annual mandatory contributions. These funds were used not only to maintain the community's property and pay its employees but also for charitable activities. This included assistance for the poorest members of the community. The allowances during this period were never lower than 250 rubles per family.

In 1878, the community renovated the Bathhouse. In 1887, architect Ruszkowicz made plans to build a new cheder and a brick synagogue. The project envisioned buildings worth nearly 7,138 silver rubles. However, the plans for the new buildings were not realized, and a more modest synagogue was constructed instead. In 1904, the synagogue building burned down, and a new one was built on its site according to Ruszkowicz's plans. The last investment of the community before the outbreak of war (in 1911) was the installation of sanitary facilities near the synagogue.

In the 19th century, there were isolated instances of individuals leaving the community. Based on the inscriptions on tombstones, researchers infer the community's strong attachment to tradition. In Szydłowiec, there were three attempts to convert from Judaism to Catholicism. Two of these cases ended with the individuals abandoning their plans to be baptized. The third case was so complicated and difficult for the provincial authorities that it was classified as secret.

=== Beginnings of social activity among Jews ===
The social activity of Jews in Szydłowiec, beyond religious matters, was largely confined to political and party activities. The Russian Revolution of 1905 in Congress Poland mobilized many social groups, both Poles and Jews, and Szydłowiec was no exception. Given the scale and nature of these events, they were significant in the city. According to the investigation files of the Radom Provincial Gendarmerie, there were cells of the Polish Socialist Party and the Bund, the latter consisting exclusively of Jews. The Bund faction maintained close ties with other socialist party cells in the region, particularly those in Radom.

The Bund supporters in Szydłowiec conducted agitation campaigns among the local population. Between 1905 and 1906, they organized a boycott of goods sold by local Jewish merchants, sometimes under the threat of force. As a result, the Szydłowiec Bund raised funds for its activities. The then-rabbi, Rubin Rabinowicz, intervened in an attempt to calm the tensions, especially among the Jewish community, but his appeals were unsuccessful. At that time, there were between 60 and 90 active members of the Bund in Szydłowiec, and it can be assumed that most of them participated in these actions. Between 1909 and 1910, a court trial was held in this matter, involving 24 individuals aged 16 to 25. The trial identified brothers Mordka and Szlame Tanenbaum as the main organizers of the entire venture. Some of the accused were sentenced to prison or exile to Siberia. The youngest were either released into parental custody or declared innocent.

== Interwar period (1918–1939) ==
=== Economy, employment, and economic situation ===
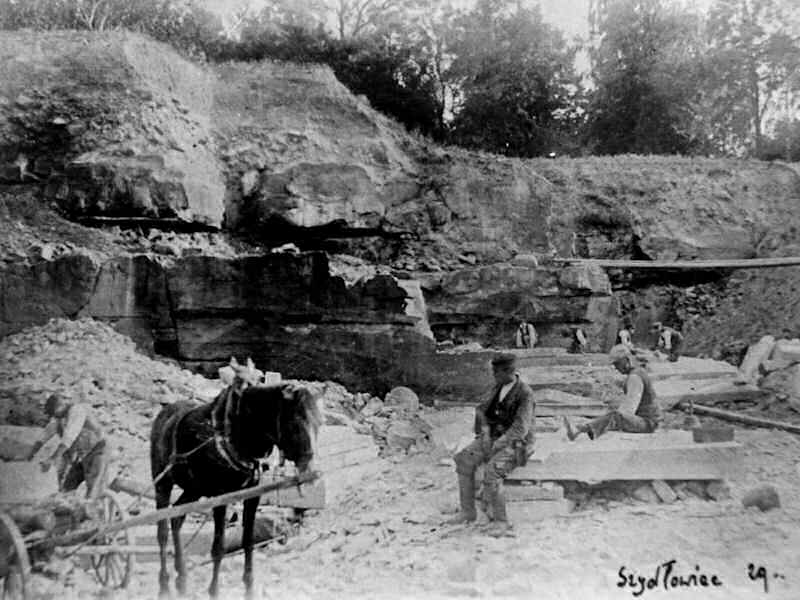
Katza Quarry

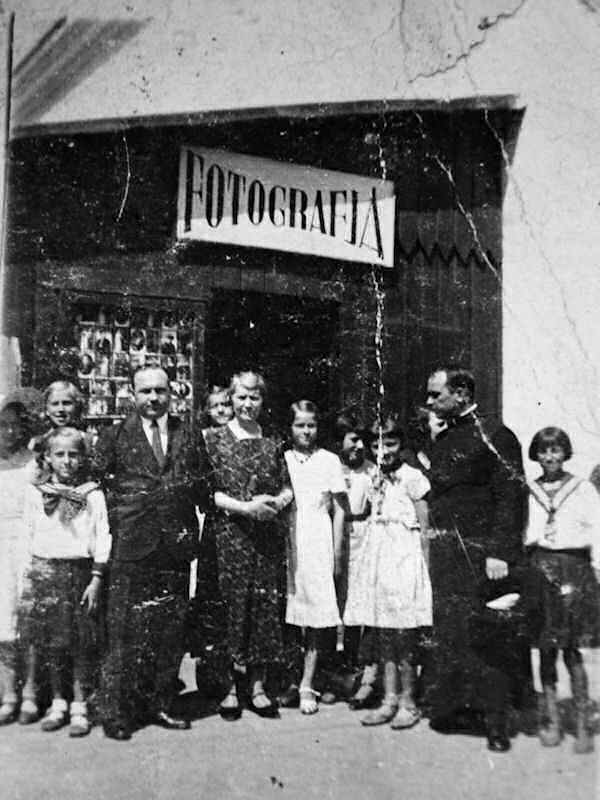
Photographic studio on Ogrodowa Street

Jewish craftsmen either set up their own small family workshops or worked for other Jews. This was due to the fact that the vast majority of uneducated Jews in Szydłowiec spoke only Yiddish fluently, a language understood by all Jews without major issues. Jewish craftsmen were particularly prominent in the leather, textile, and personal services industries. They mainly worked in hat-making, boot-making, tailoring, baking, butchering, and shoemaking. Over 60% of the craftsmen in the Koneckie County were tailors and shoemakers.

This one-sided craft structure was largely influenced by religious rules that favored some trades while restricting others. For example, the prohibition against Jews wearing certain types of clothing promoted the development of tailoring, while the ban on eating pork limited the scope of the sausage-making industry. Products made by Szydłowiec craftsmen (who were almost entirely Jewish) served to satisfy the basic needs of the local population. Consequently, the production was focused on consumer goods, with almost no factories producing luxury items, such as jewelry or photography. The town had two watchmaking shops and one photographic studio. Most of the goods were of high quality, and Jewish craftsmen in Szydłowiec were renowned for their work. The demand for their products did not decrease even during the deep economic crisis.

Despite this, the financial situation of many craftsmen (especially tailors and shoemakers) was difficult. This was due to the intense competition in these trades. These craftsmen often had to limit themselves to repairs and alterations, frequently and actively seeking customers. One witness describes this phenomenon as follows: "In the store, one bought goods, but on market days, tailors would hover around the stores, making sure people would come to them to sew [...]. Poor Jewish tailors would travel from village to village in search of orders, which they would carry out on-site, in the client's house".

There are no data on the number of Jewish-owned commercial establishments in Szydłowiec. According to a 1933 study conducted by the Economic and Statistical Bureau of Cekabe, over 80% of retail establishments in small towns in the Kielce Voivodeship were owned by Jews. Trade was dominated by general merchandise stores, small, family-run businesses where the owner and his family worked. These stores typically sold basic necessities, such as lard, soap, and jam. Specialized stores were relatively few. In Szydłowiec, there were the following specialized shops:

- Delicatessen: Chęciński, Goldfarb, Griczman, Chorowicz
- Grocery stores: Birencwajg, Cukierman, Finkielsztajn, Kondelczuk, Lieberman, Nisenbaum, Rozenberg, Sztajerman
- Clothing: Blimbaum, Brojfman, Cukier, Erlich, Gerszsonowicz, Kapfman, Rozenbaum, Rozencwajg, Sztrowajc, Zylberman
- Hardware: Blajchman, Branbmesser, Rozenbaum
- Bookstores: Kuperman, Rozenberg, Zylbersztejn
- Restaurants: Cukier, Erlich, Judman, Sztajman
- Tea houses: Dymant, Erlich, Kufman, Rabinowicz

Not only shopkeepers were involved in trade. They particularly struggled with peddlers and street vendors. This phenomenon was always present, but it became more pronounced during the Great Depression. These vendors offered cheaper goods, though not always of inferior quality. Their goods were intended for the poorest clientele, so they were most commonly found on market days. This form of trade reflected the poverty of a wide group of sellers. One researcher of the Jewish economy in the interwar period stated that "the pauperization of the merchant class had reached absurd proportions". In this situation, many merchants did not have the funds to purchase an industrial certificate to legally practice their trade and had to rely on social assistance. Jewish organizations (especially interest-free loan funds) provided aid for this purpose, which affected a large portion of the merchant class.

=== Family life ===
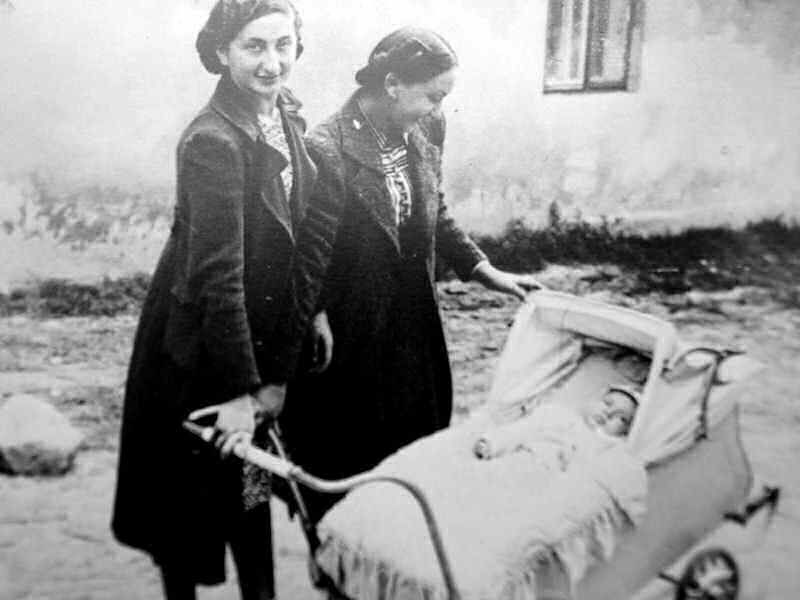
Jewish women with a child on a street in Szydłowiec

Religious law had a significant influence on Jewish family life. From birth to death, every moment of life was sanctified by rituals. Tradition dictated that children be raised with respect for their parents, elders, and scholars. The Jewish morning prayer for children (Modeh Ani) emphasized this principle: "I will do what my father commands and what my mother commands and what all good and pious people tell me to do". Through this, parents and educators gradually introduced children into a social life based on religious principles. Newborn boys were initiated into the community through the ritual of circumcision, performed by a mohel on the eighth day after birth.

=== Jewish community and its organization ===
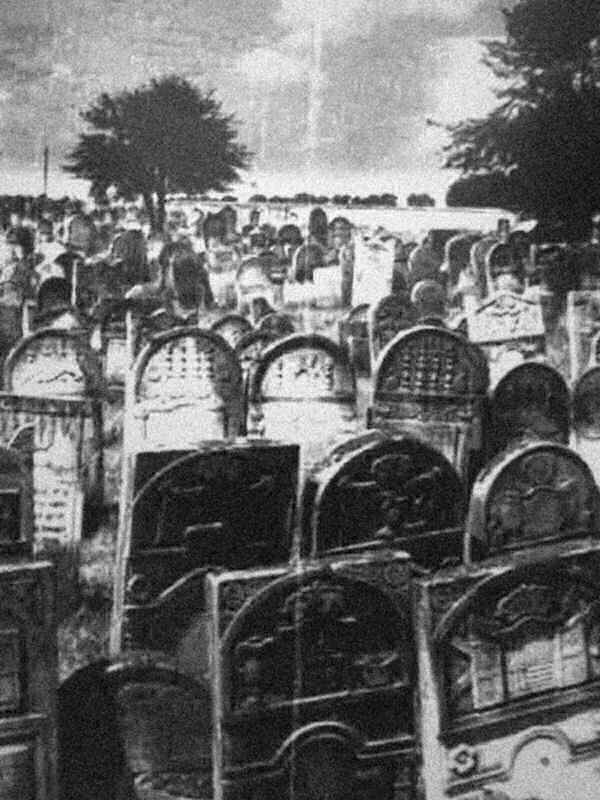
Jewish cemetery

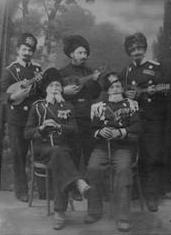
Purim holiday masqueraders (1937)

Jewish communities in the Second Polish Republic were divided into so-called large communities (with more than 5,000 members) and smaller ones. The local community belonged to the large category. Throughout the interwar period, Rabbi Chaim Rabinowicz led the community. Additionally, it was governed by a board and a council. The Jewish Community Council served as a legislative and supervisory body, while the board acted as the executive branch, functioning similarly to the structures of associations. The terms of both the board and the council lasted between two and three years.

In the 1920s, the board included President Abram Mosze Cytryn, Vice President Rachmil Chaim Bliżyński, and members Hersz Nachman Blatman, Aron Liberbaum, Wigdor Anilewicz, and P. M. Herszfeld. In the 1931 elections for the community authorities, the joint list of Zionists and Mizrachi received the most votes, securing five out of twelve seats on the council. The Orthodox faction won four seats, while three were allocated to candidates endorsed by the rabbi. In the next elections, held in 1934, the Agudat Yisrael party emerged victorious. The last elections for the council and board took place in 1936, when the Zionists won 60% of the seats in both governing bodies, defeating the Orthodox by a margin of 20 percentage points. Between 1938 and 1939, the board was presided over by the Zionist Abram Redlich, while the council was chaired by Mejlich Wólfowicz from Aguda. Any further records from the 1930s regarding the composition of the council and board have been lost.

=== Political activity ===
==== Jewish political parties in Szydłowiec ====
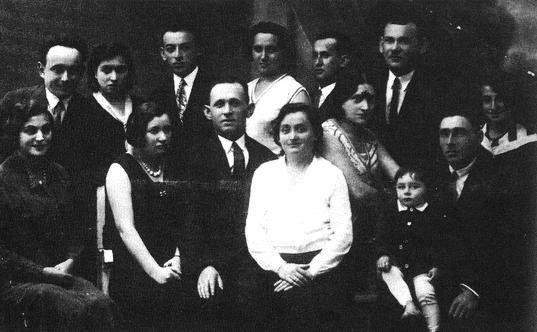
Members of Poale Zion

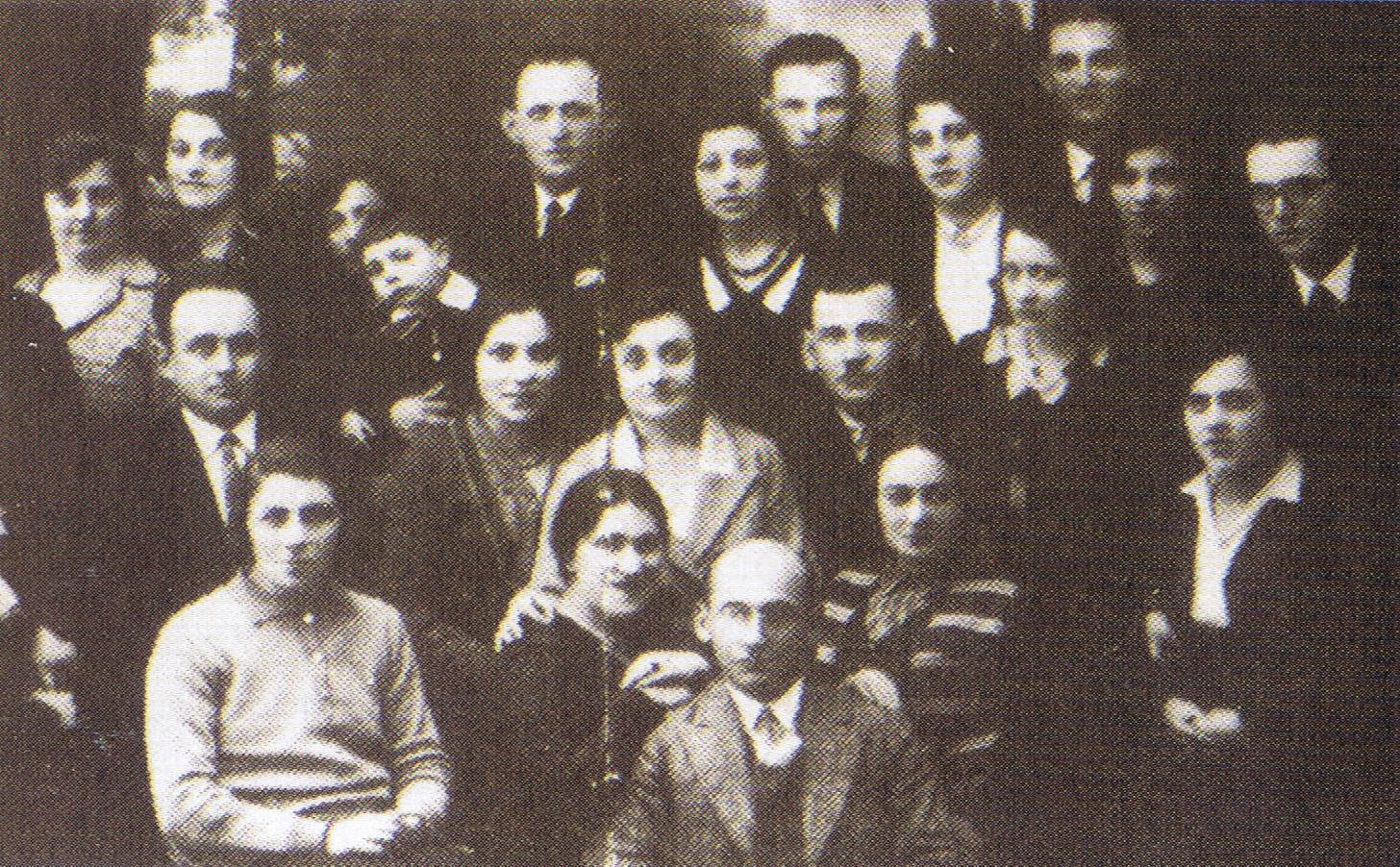
Szydłowiec members of Poale Zion-Left

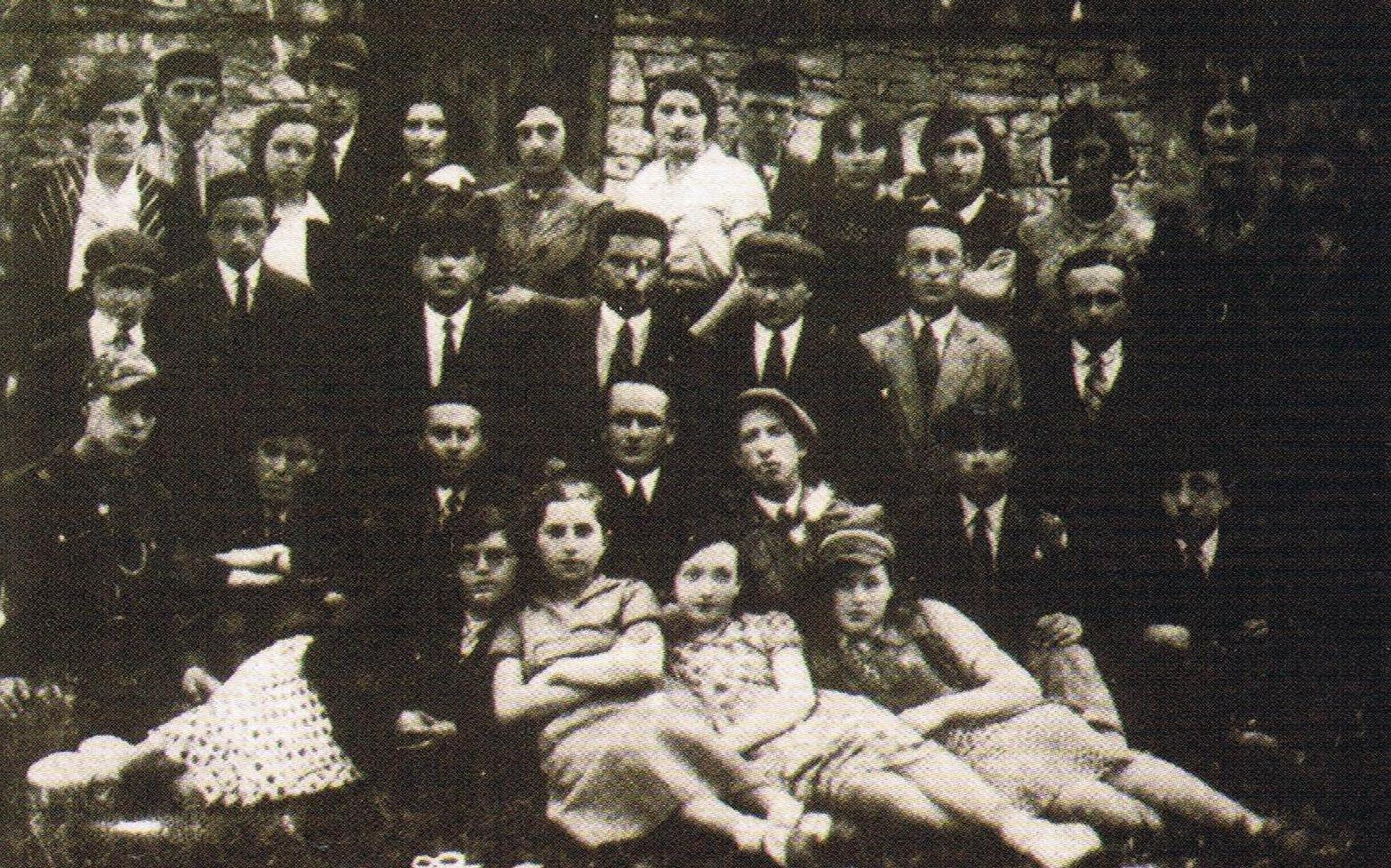
Members of Mizrachi

The Orthodox movement in the city was represented by Agudat Yisrael, which enjoyed significant public support. However, the party's activities were largely limited to election campaigns. In 1929, the Szydłowiec branch of the party had 500 members, primarily Jews from the middle class and bourgeoisie. The party leadership at the time consisted of Hejnoch Kuperman, Szlama Nauberg, and Jankiel Wigdorowicz. This was the largest Agudat Yisrael branch in the district. The party also had affiliated groups, including Bnos Agudat Yisrael (for women), Poale Agudat Yisrael (for workers), and the youth organization Tzeirei Agudat Yisrael. It dominated Jewish religious education in Szydłowiec and influenced two out of the three banks in the city: the Cooperative Share Bank and the Credit Bank. This strong presence was reflected in the City Council. In the 1927 elections, out of 13 elected Jewish representatives, five were from Agudat Yisrael, which was repeated in 1928. In 1934, all eight Jewish council members belonged to Agudat Yisrael. However, the outcome of the latter election did not accurately reflect actual party support, as it was boycotted by other factions.

Zionist activities in Szydłowiec date back to World War I. However, until around 1925, they did not play a major role despite the popularity of Zionism. By the 1930s, branches of all major Zionist movements operated in the city. The most significant was the Zionist Organization in Poland, which had 200 members. Its leadership included Motek Ajzenberg, Lejbuś Dyment, and Lejbuś Zylberman. The party took control of the local branch of the Tarbut Jewish Cultural and Educational Association and the Society for Evening Courses.

Bund (General Jewish Labour Bund) was one of the Jewish socialist parties. There is no official record of when the party's structures were established in Szydłowiec, but it likely emerged as early as 1918. By 1929, the local Bund cell had 50 members. The party's leadership in Szydłowiec included Szapsia Laks, Abram Laks, Abram Blicher, and Szyja Opatowski. Bund had influence over the United Jewish Schools Association, the Jutrznia Sports Association, and the Leather Industry Workers' Union. It also had some sway over the Society for Evening Courses and the Shoe Industry Workers' Union. The party established its own youth organization in the city – the Youth Union Future (Tsukunft). The Szydłowiec branch collaborated closely with the nearby branch in Końskie, both of which were part of the Bund district in Radom.

Bund engaged in extensive propaganda activities in Szydłowiec, publishing numerous pamphlets, leaflets, appeals, and several workers' newspapers. The party organized many strikes and demonstrations, particularly in the 1930s. While most had economic motivations, Bund was also active in protesting against the persecution of Jews in Germany. In October 1937, in response to the discrimination of Jewish students in higher education (the "ghetto benches"), Bund organized a work-to-rule strike in Jewish shops and workshops in Szydłowiec. Alongside the Polish Socialist Party, Bund also participated in International Workers' Day celebrations. In the 1920s, these took the form of annual parades, but when authorities denied permission for such events in the 1930s, the celebrations were limited to speeches and gatherings.

== World War II (1939–1945) ==
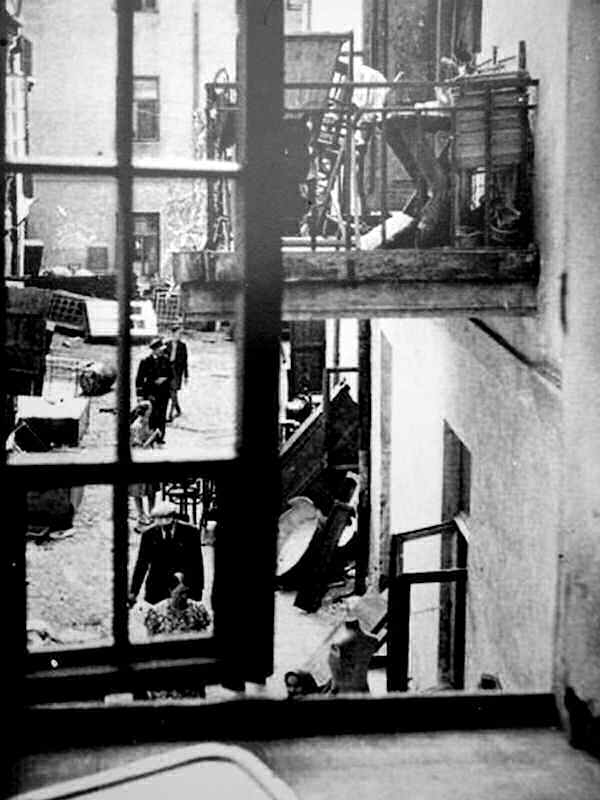
Mass flight of Jews from occupied Szydłowiec

On 1 September 1939, the Jewish population of Szydłowiec was estimated at 7,200 people. However, between 200 and 300 Jews left the town during the September Campaign. This was due to various factors, including military conscription and fear of the Nazi invasion. Many Jews were drafted into the army, though the exact number remains unknown. It is only documented that some were later imprisoned in a prisoner-of-war camp in Moosburg an der Isar.

Szydłowiec was occupied by German forces on 8 September 1939. Immediately upon their arrival, Wehrmacht soldiers began persecuting the Jewish population. One of the first humiliating measures imposed on Jews was forcing them to sweep the city streets while wearing religious garments.

=== Daily life under occupation ===
Since Jews, according to the fundamental principles of Nazi ideology, were deprived of all rights, the occupiers exploited them without mercy. This situation had far-reaching consequences for daily life. In the first months of the occupation (until the fall of France), there was optimism and hope for the swift end of the war in Szydłowiec. Initially, Jews did not pay much attention to the anti-Semitism from the occupiers, and all signs of it were turned into jokes. A popular proverb was Men ot zejn in dred, men wet zej zo wi zo iberleben (which translates to: We have them in the ground, so we'll survive them). Over time, however, this optimism faded. The growing persecution led to an increase in religious activity among Jews and a widespread belief that living in strong faith was the only way to survive. Even among members and supporters of the Bund and other socialist organizations, this view found followers. This trend reached its peak after the arrival of Orthodox Hasidim from the Eastern Borderlands. The ideas they propagated gained many supporters in Szydłowiec.

One of the wartime phenomena was an increase in marriages, especially among the old faith community. Most of these marriages were symbolic, aimed at protecting young men from forced labor in the Reich, as they would become the sole breadwinners of their families. In Szydłowiec, the Germans also imposed a ban on the reproduction of Jews, which led to a lack of births. However, no official sources documenting this phenomenon have survived. It is likely that there was clandestine teaching among the Jewish population, especially religious teachings, but it had to be limited to narrow, secret circles of people.

=== Ghetto ===
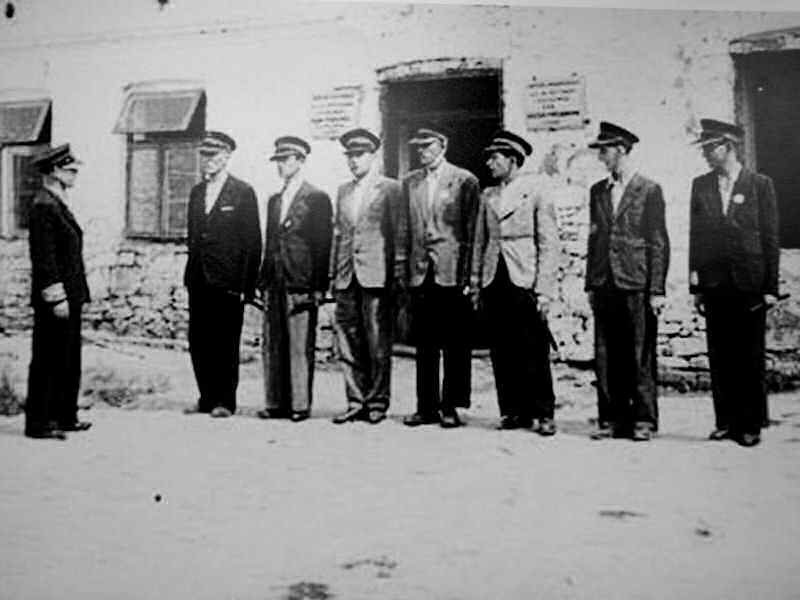
Assembly of the Jewish Ghetto Police

Deportations and expulsions did not rid the Radom District of its Jewish population. Constant roundups contributed to escapes from the city and the settlement of Jews in rural areas, as well as hiding in the surrounding forests (including the creation of a Jewish-socialist partisan movement). Previously, Szydłowiec had served as a relatively peaceful and privileged city considering wartime and occupation circumstances. However, when news of the mass liquidation of ghettos across the General Government reached Szydłowiec in the second half of 1942, the city faced the prospect of a Jewish ghetto. The ghetto was established in August 1942. Since Jews had inhabited all districts of Szydłowiec and constituted the majority in the city, the ghetto was set up throughout the entire city. However, as the Gestapo established a post in nearby Skarżysko-Kamienna, the Judenrat decided to introduce changes. The optimistic mood and widespread hope for the swift end of the war and the liberation of Poland from occupation, which prevailed in Szydłowiec until the end of 1942, led members of this organization to believe in the propaganda assurances of Nazi officials. Therefore, with little resistance, they agreed to designate a smaller area for the ghetto in the Skałka and Praga districts.

This optimism quickly diminished with the wave of ghetto liquidations, which resulted in many Jews from the former Kielce Voivodeship being brought to Szydłowiec. To speed up further extermination, smaller groups of Jews were relocated to larger ones near the station and railway tracks. Jews from Wolanów, Wierzbica, and Skaryszew were brought to Szydłowiec. As a result, the population of the ghetto increased to 16,300, far surpassing the prewar population of the city. The ghetto was not fenced, but units of the Gestapo were stationed at the city's gates. The liquidation took place on 23 September 1942. A solid cordon of military and SS units gathered the Jews at Freedom Square and then herded them through the streets: Radomska, Rynek, Kielecka, and Kolejowa, to the railway station in Sadek, 6 kilometers away from the concentration point. Those who could not walk quickly enough were murdered along the way (including patients from the ghetto hospital). After these events, Kolejowa Street in Szydłowiec became known as the "bloody road". It is estimated that around 200 Jews were killed during the expulsion, but these estimates are incomplete.

== Bibliography ==
- Wijaczka, Jacek, ed. (1997). Żydzi Szydłowieccy. Materiały sesji popularnonaukowej 22 II 1997 r. [Jews of Szydłowiec. Materials from the Popular Science Session, 22 February 1997] (in Polish). Szydłowiec: MLIM.
- Renz, Regina (1994). Życie codzienne w miasteczkach województwa kieleckiego 1918–1939 [Everyday Life in the Towns of the Kielce Voivodeship 1918–1939] (in Polish). Kielce: Kieleckie Towarzystwo Naukowe.
