= Pacification of Skłoby =

Mass crime committed by German occupiers

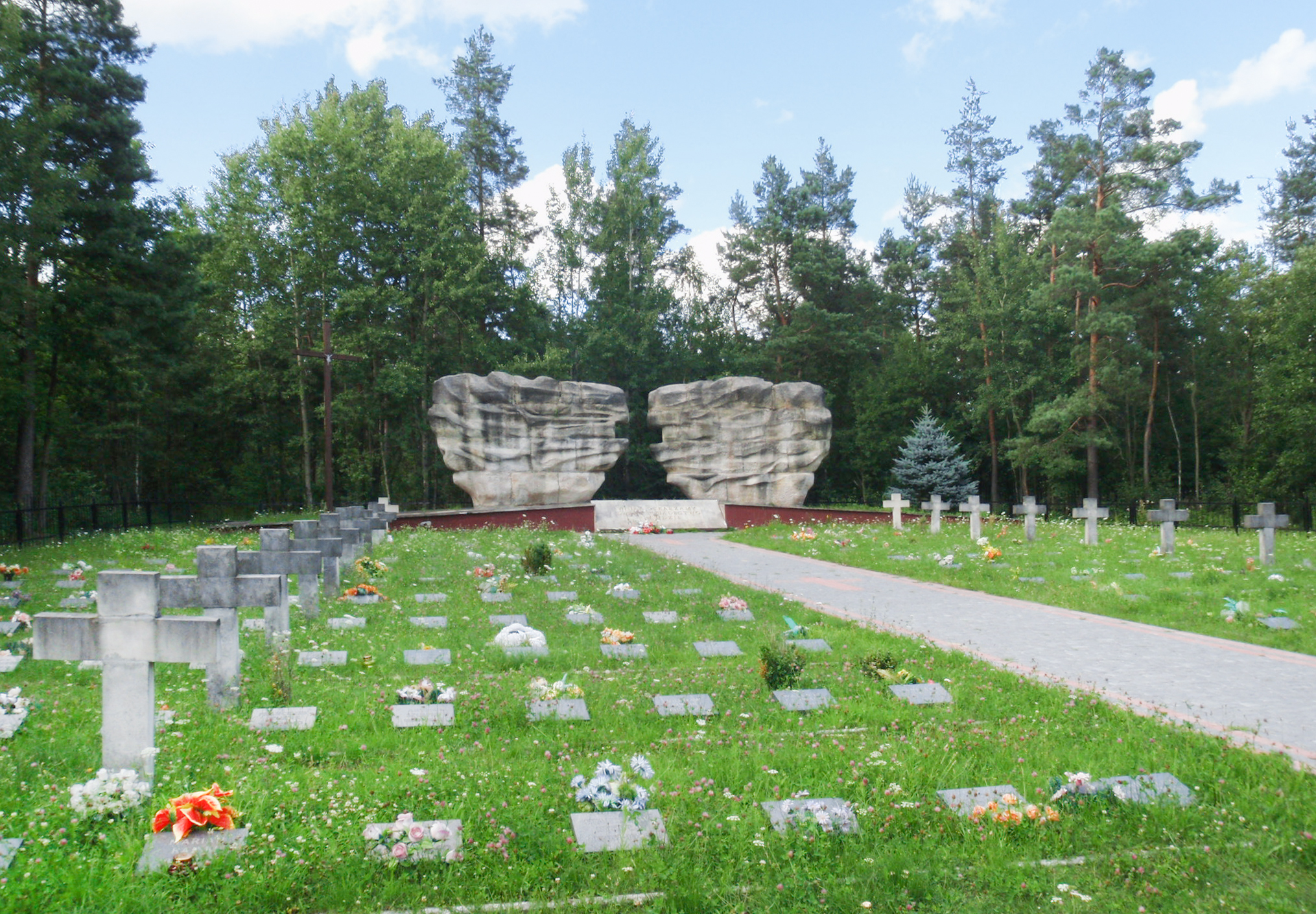
- Cemetery of the victims of the Skłoby pacification
- Location: Skłoby
- Date: April 11, 1940
- Attack type: mass shooting
- Deaths: 265 people
- Perpetrator: Nazi Germany

Pacification of Skłoby was a mass crime committed by German occupiers on 11 April 1940.

Skłoby was pacified in retaliation for the activities of Major Henryk Dobrzański's, codenamed Hubal, Detached Unit of the Polish Army. A punitive expedition, consisting of Ordnungspolizei officers supported by members of the SS and Selbstschutz, completely burned down the village and arrested nearly all men aged 15 to 60. That same day, 265 detained Poles were executed in the Rzuców forest. This was the bloodiest of all Hubal pacifications.

== Background ==
Skłoby lies on the edge of the Kielce-Końskie forest complex. It is a sprawling village surrounded by woods. Before the war, it comprised about 400 homesteads and roughly 1,000 inhabitants. Due to poor soil quality and small farm sizes, the village was impoverished, with a significant portion of its population employed outside agriculture.

On 14 March 1940, the Detached Unit of the Polish Army, led by Major Henryk Dobrzański, codenamed Hubal, set up quarters in Hucisko, less than five kilometers away. While stationed in the Chlewiska and Nieklan forests, the "Hubal men" never quartered in Skłoby, but they received extensive support from its residents. The village collected food for the soldiers and fodder for their horses, and several men volunteered to join the unit. Soon, increased activity by German informants and patrols was noted in the area.

On 30 March 1940, SS and German police units launched a large-scale manhunt for Hubal's unit. However, the attack on Hucisko resulted in a severe defeat for the occupiers. After this victorious clash, the "Hubal men" withdrew to Szałas, 25 kilometers away, where they repelled another German assault on 1 April. Shortly thereafter, Hubal managed to extract his soldiers from the encircled area, albeit at the cost of partially dispersing the unit.

The failed attempts to destroy the Polish unit damaged the prestige of German police authorities. This was likely a key reason why the Higher SS and Police Leader in the General Government, SS-Obergruppenführer Friedrich-Wilhelm Krüger, ordered a large-scale pacification campaign targeting villages near the "Hubal men's" operations. The reprisals against civilians aimed to erase the impression of failure caused by earlier setbacks against Hubal. Over the next two weeks, 31 localities in the pre-war Końskie County, Kielce County, and Opoczno County were subjected to various forms of repression. Four villages were completely burned down, and a fifth had most of its buildings destroyed. The Germans murdered 712 civilians, including two women and six children.

== Course of the pacification ==
After the fighting at Hucisko, the Skłoby village head, Ignacy Czerwonka, was summoned to the gendarmerie post in Chlewiska, where he was ordered to compile a list of residents collaborating with Hubal's unit. After consulting local teachers, he refused, arguing that the entire population had aided the Polish soldiers. Soon, rumors reached the villagers that "the Germans will burn Skłoby", but these did not provoke significant alarm.

In the night of 10–11 April, a German punitive expedition arrived by car from Szydłowiec. It comprised police officers, supported by SS and Selbstschutz members. Before dawn, the Germans surrounded Skłoby with a tight cordon. They then began arresting men aged 15 to 60, basing detentions on physical appearance without checking documents. Only 11 men from Upper Skłoby escaped capture by slipping out before the encirclement was complete.

The detainees were driven to neighboring Stefanków. During the march, they were beaten with rifle butts. Upon arrival, they were loaded onto trucks and taken to the school in Chlewiska. In the classrooms, the prisoners were lined up facing the wall and severely beaten for the slightest movement. Through an interpreter, they were told they would be punished for aiding Hubal's unit. Additional men from Skłoby, discovered during house searches, were soon brought to the school.

After a time, small groups of detainees were taken to a separate room where a commission of police officers and an interpreter verified identities, confiscated documents, and conducted brief interrogations. The selection process released boys under 15 and men over 60. (Note: One of the witnesses claimed that the boys were released in Stefanków (Terror hitlerowski (1988, p. 70)).) The Germans also freed a few men of conscription age: forester Jan Osóbka, gamekeepers Adam Korczak and Marian Stopa, and miner Czarnota. Witnesses claimed a German quietly advised young boys and older men to give ages qualifying for release. The forester and gamekeepers were reportedly saved by the intervention of Jan Wiener, the estate manager in Chlewiska. However, some 14-year-olds or younger, who overstated their age during questioning to stay with fathers or brothers, remained among the "selected".

Meanwhile, after removing the men, the Germans systematically set fire to Skłoby's buildings, destroying nearly 400 homesteads. Only the school and two to five other structures survived. Women and children (Note: Among the surviving residents of Skłoby, a rumor later spread that the women and children were spared from execution due to the intervention of a German general's wife (Porczek (2008, pp. 267, 290)).) salvaged some belongings and livestock from the burning farms. Some displaced residents found refuge with relatives or acquaintances in nearby villages, while others were forced to camp in Skłoby's ruins.

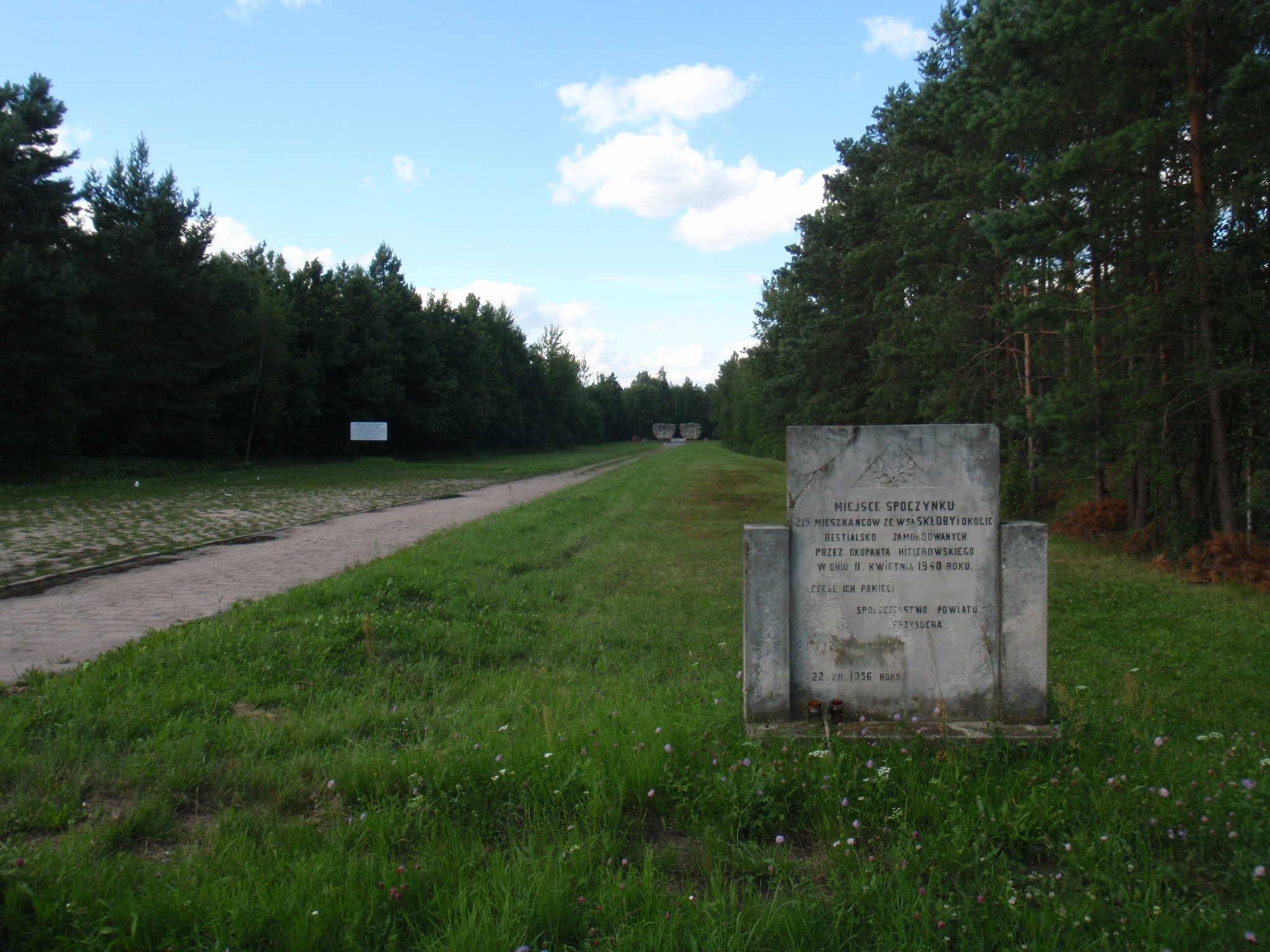
Entrance to the cemetery of pacification victims

Having completed interrogations, the Germans began exterminating the "selected" men. The execution site was the Rzuców forest, where Jews from Szydłowiec had dug mass graves the previous evening. Executions occurred at two locations: near the Rzuców ponds (closer to Stefanków) and about 300 meters from the Szydłowiec–Przysucha road fork (now the site of a cemetery and monument). (Note: In the area of the Rzuców ponds, one large grave and two smaller ones were later discovered, while near the highway, one large grave and three smaller ones were found (Terror hitlerowski (1988, p. 73)).) Victims were taken from the school in groups of ten, loaded onto trucks, driven to the forest, and shot. Four men from the first group – Michał Duda, Jan Głuch, Antoni Piec, and Jan Pietras – escaped by exploiting the Germans' inattention. Following this, the executioners took extra precautions, binding the victims' hands and blindfolding them (sometimes with their own caps or scarves). The wounded were finished off with bayonets and, according to some accounts, grenades thrown into the pits. The executions continued until dusk. Afterward, the Germans forced Jews from nearby villages to fill the mass graves. Some severely wounded Poles were likely buried alive.

A list of victims, compiled by the Main Commission for the Investigation of Nazi Crimes in Poland, names 265 individuals. Other sources estimate 215, 216, or 228 deaths. No more than 30 Skłoby men survived the massacre. It was the deadliest of all "Hubal pacifications".

That same day, the Germans also burned down Gałki and Hucisko, killing 12 and 22 Poles, respectively. This marked the final act of the "Hubal pacifications".

== Aftermath ==
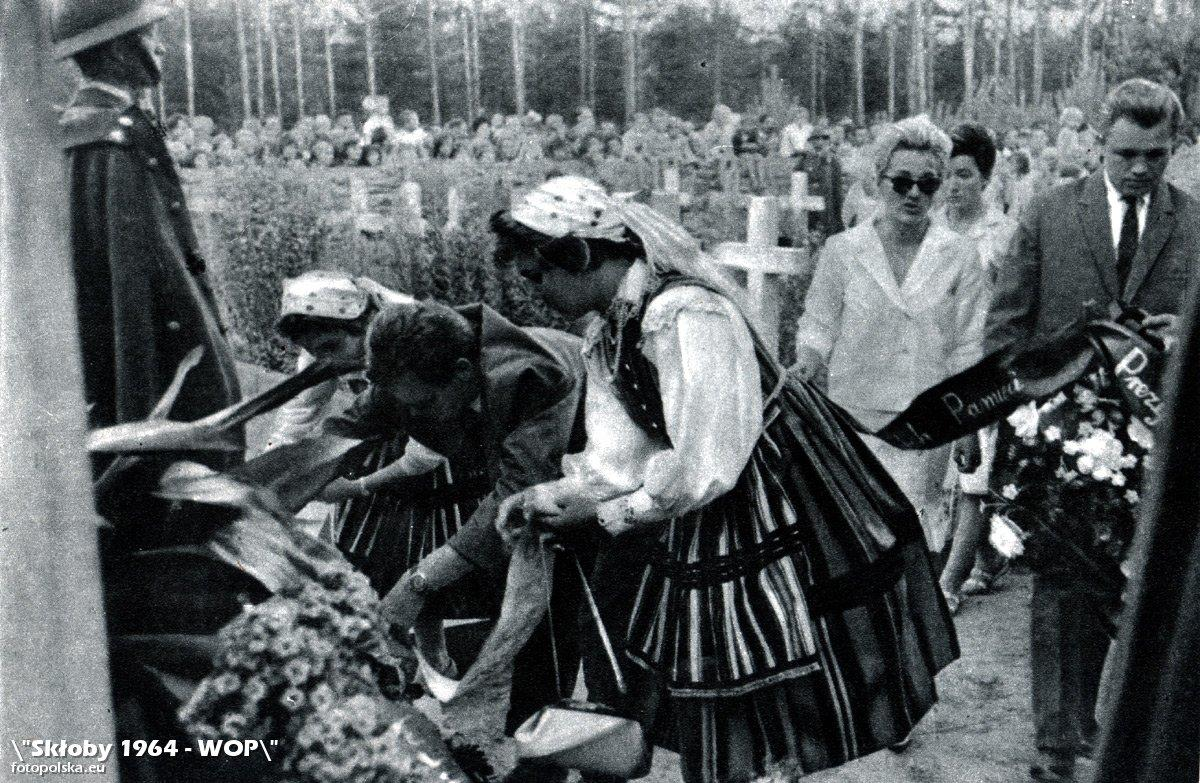
Ceremonies at the Skłoby cemetery, 1960s

Women from Skłoby, who heard gunfire from the Rzuców forest, searched for their loved ones the next day, discovering mass graves and execution traces. Three days later, victims' families obtained permission from Chlewiska municipal authorities to exhume the bodies. Franciszek Świercz's remains were buried by his family in Nadolna cemetery, and Jan Szlufik's in Chlewiska. The rest were interred in individual graves near the execution site. Weeks later, the Germans ordered the graves leveled and young trees planted over them, but families defied the occupiers' ban by marking the graves.

Post-occupation, a war cemetery was established at the execution site along the Szydłowiec–Przysucha road, incorporating remains from the Rzuców ponds area. A monument with a five-meter wingspan was erected there. In the 1960s, to honor the victims, a "Millennium School" was built in Skłoby, funded by donations from Border Protection Forces soldiers.

In 1977, Skłoby was awarded the Order of the Cross of Grunwald, 3rd Class.

== Perpetrators ==
The pacification was carried out by the Police Battalion 51 (Polizei-Battalion 51). German sources indicate its 3rd Company secured the village cordon, the 2nd Company set fire to the buildings, and the 1st Company conducted the executions.

Polish sources also note participation by SS and Selbstschutz members.

In May 2018, photographs from a 51st Battalion NCO's album, including images of Skłoby's pacification, appeared on an online auction site. Three photos from Skłoby were purchased by Tomasz Kaleta and donated to the Institute of National Remembrance.

== Bibliography ==
- Kosztyła, Zygmunt (1987). Oddział Wydzielony Wojska Polskiego Majora „Hubala” [Detached Unit of the Polish Army of Major "Hubal"] (in Polish). Warsaw: MON. ISBN 83-11-07345-7.
- Porczek, Wiesław (2008). "216 mogił w Skłobach" [216 Graves in Skłoby]. In Durlej, Stanisław; Gmitruk, Janusz (eds.). Zbrodnie hitlerowskie na wsi polskiej w latach 1939–1945. Wspomnienia, pamiętniki i relacje [Nazi Crimes Against the Polish Countryside 1939–1945: Memoirs, Diaries, and Accounts] (in Polish). Kielce; Warsaw: Muzeum Historii Polskiego Ruchu Ludowego. ISBN 978-83-85953-43-2.
- "Terror hitlerowski na wsi kieleckiej. Wybór dokumentów źródłowych" [Nazi Terror in the Kielce Countryside: Selection of Source Documents]. Rocznik Świętokrzyski (in Polish). XV. 1988. ISSN 0485-3261.
