= Klain Bund =

Youth organization of the Jewish Labour Bund

Klain Bund (Yiddish for 'Little Bund') was a youth organization in the Russian Empire, connected to the General Jewish Labour Bund in Lithuania, Poland and Russia. Klain Bund was founded in 1903.

Klain Bund recruited secondary school pupils, students, apprentices and young workers. The average age of Klain Bund-members was around fourteen. Sometimes members joined at ages of 10–12. Often Klain Bund members were children of Bund members. Klain Bund provided socialist education for its members. Members also helped the mother party in its activities, such as collecting funds for striking workers or maintaining communications with Bundist self-defense groups.

Klain Bund was later superseded by a new Bundist youth organization, Tsukunft ('Future').
