= Young Communist League of Poland =

Political youth organisation

Young Communist League of Poland Związek Młodzieży Komunistycznej w Polsce
- Founded: February 22, 1922
- Dissolved: 1938
- Membership: 7,000 (1931)
- Ideology: Communism; Marxism–Leninism
- Mother party: Communist Party of Poland
- International affiliation: Young Communist International
- Newspaper: Towarzysz (1922–1936), Towarzysz Młodzieży (1937–1938)

The Young Communist League of Poland (Polish: Związek Młodzieży Komunistycznej w Polsce, abbreviated ZMKwP), in February 1930 renamed as the Communist League of Youth in Poland Polish: Komunistyczny Związek Młodzieży Polski, abbreviated KZMP), was the youth wing of the interbellum Communist Party of Poland between 1922 and 1938. ZMKwP/KZMP was a section of the Young Communist International.

== Founding ==
The founding congress of ZMKwP was held on March 22, 1922. Alfred Lampe was elected Secretary of the Central Committee of ZMKwP at the time of its first congress. The other members of the Central Committee of ZMKwP were Bronisław Berman, Leon Holcer, Władysław Kniewski, Tadeusz Oppman, Stanisław Teszner, Antoni Werner and Włodzimierz Zawadzki.

== Growth ==
In 1923 the left opposition of the Polish League of Socialist Youth (ZPMS) joined ZMKwP. Komtsukunft, the youth wing of the Jewish Communist Labour Bund in Poland, merged into ZMKwP in March–April 1923. ZMKwP also absorbed dissidents from the Poale Zion Left and Fareynikte factions.

In 1925 ZMKwP organized a pioneer movement for children, Pionier. Later followed the setting up of organization amongst secondary school students.

ZMKwP had some 3,700 members as of June 1926. As of July 1931, membership had increased to around 7,000. KZMP had a larger percentage of Jewish membership than the mother party. As of 1930, 51% of KZMP members were Jews, 19% Poles, 18% Ukrainians and 12% Bielorussians. The Jewish dominance in the membership hindered expansion between in rural areas, as Jewish-dominated branches in small towns were largely disconnected from the peasantry in the surrounding countrysides. However, by 1933 the ethnic proportions had changed with 33% of KZMP members being Poles, 31% Jews, 19% Bielorussians and 17% Ukrainians. The decline in the percentage of Jewish members corresponded to an increase of recruitment amongst the peasantry. By 1932 50% of KZMP members hailed from the peasantry.

== Publication ==
The publication Towarzysz ('Comrade') was the organ of the Central Committee of ZMKwP/KZMP, published from Warsaw. In 1937, it changed name to Towarzysz Młodzieży ('Young Comrade').

== Dissolution ==
In 1938 KZMP was dissolved, along with the mother party, by a decision of the Executive Committee of the Communist International.
