= Skłoby =

- Village
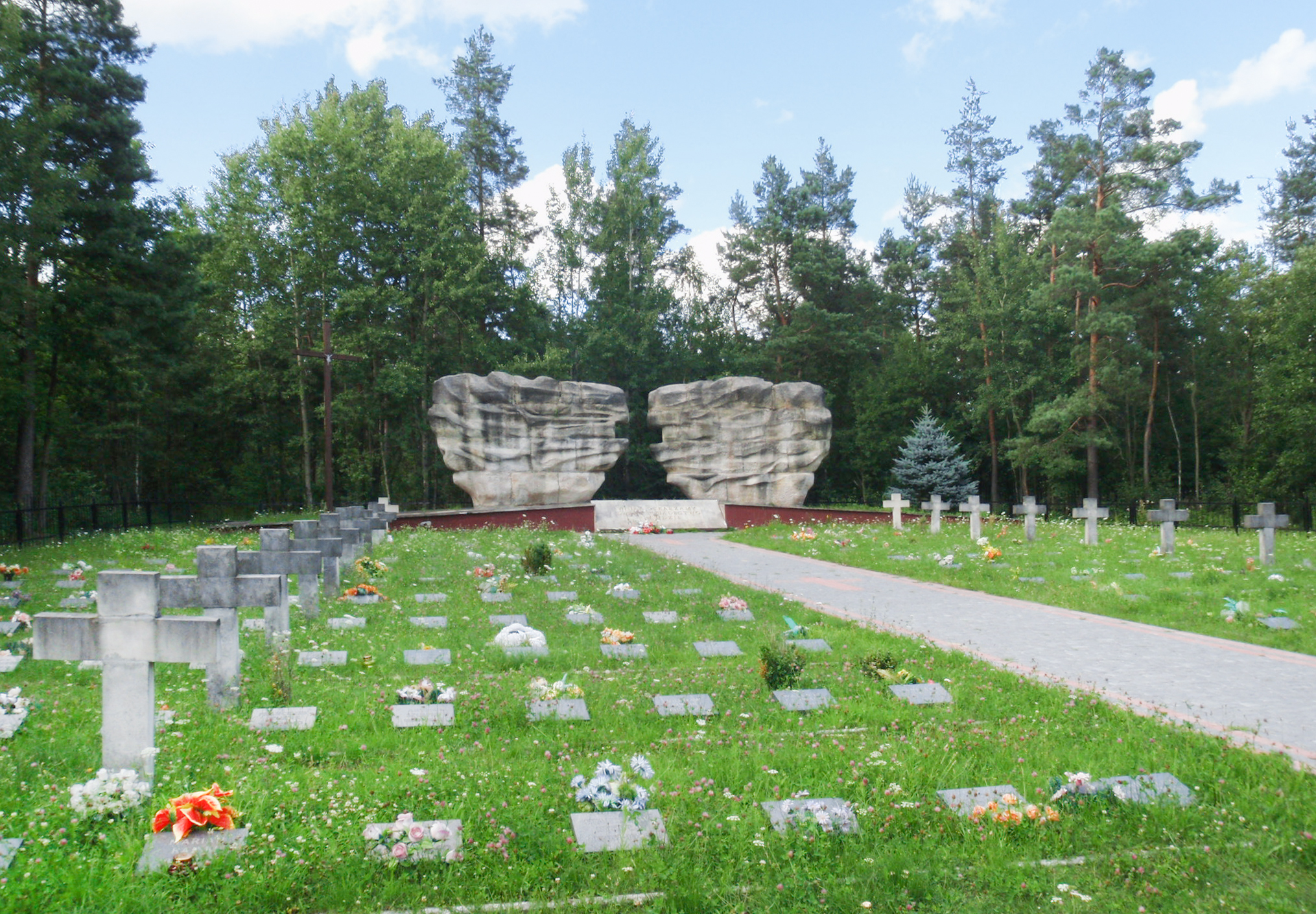
- Cemetery of the victims of the German massacre of Poles from 1940 in Skłoby

- Location within Poland
- Coordinates: 51°15′N 20°42′E
- Country: Poland
- Voivodeship: Masovian
- County: Szydłowiec
- Gmina: Chlewiska
- Population: 555
- Time zone: UTC+1 (CET)
  - Summer (DST): UTC+2 (CEST)
- Vehicle registration: WSZ

Skłoby [ˈskwɔbɨ] is a village in the administrative district of Gmina Chlewiska, within Szydłowiec County, Masovian Voivodeship, in east-central Poland. It is about 5 km (3 mi) west of Chlewiska, 11 km (7 mi) west of Szydłowiec, and 110 km (68 mi) south of Warsaw.

== History ==
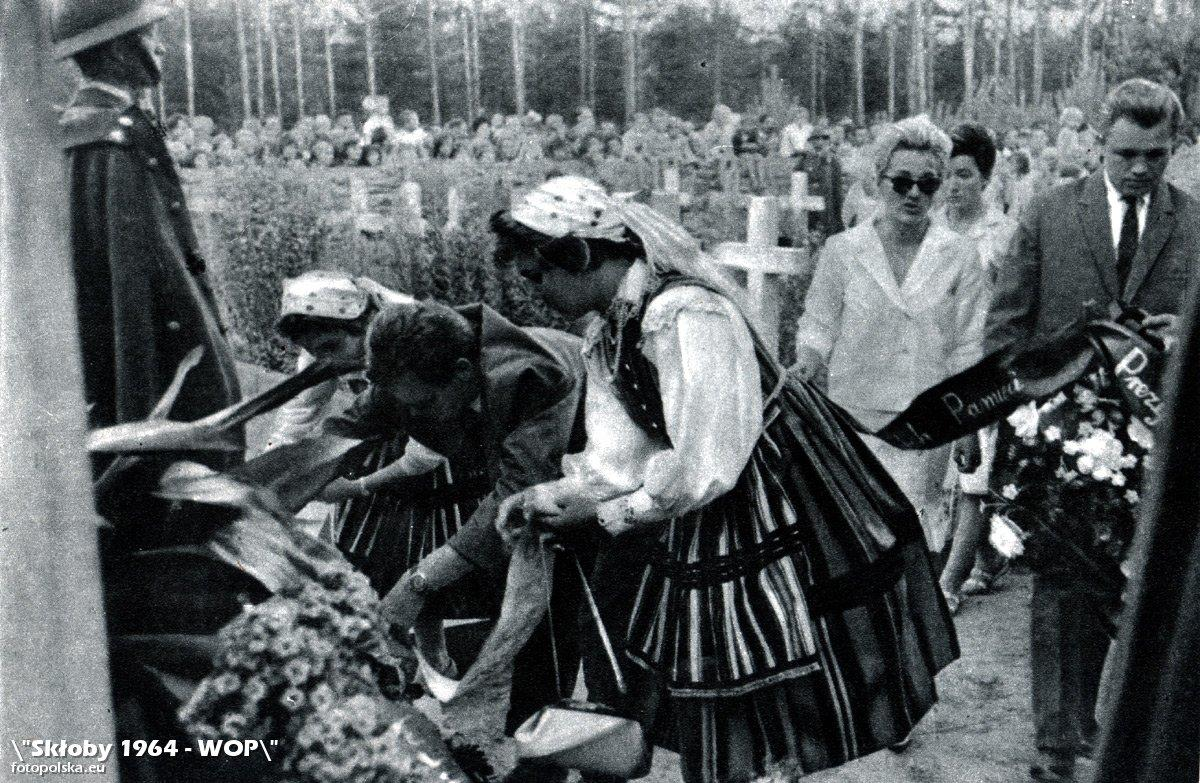
Ceremony at the graves of murdered Poles in 1964

Skłoby was a private village, administratively in the Radom County in the Sandomierz Voivodeship in the Lesser Poland Province of the Kingdom of Poland. In the mid-15th century it was owned by the Chlewicki family.

In 1827 its population was 253. In the late 19th century it had increased to 594.

After the joint German and Soviet invasion of Poland, which started World War II in September 1939, the town was occupied by Germany until 1945. The Polish resistance movement was active in the area. On April 11, 1940, a clash between the Germans and the Polish resistance took place at Skłoby. After the clash, German gendarmerie and Selbstschutz pacified the village. Men aged 15–60 were taken to the nearby forest and executed, and houses with old people, children and women were doused with gasoline and burned down.
