= Komtsukunft =

- Founded: in the early 1920s
- Location: Poland

Komtsukunft (Yiddish: קאָמצוקונפֿט, Polish: Komunistyczna Organizacja Młodzieży Cukunft) was a Jewish communist youth organization in Poland in the early 1920s. It was the youth wing of the Jewish Communist Labour Bund in Poland.

The organization was a splinter group of the Bundist Tsukunft movement. The split occurred in late 1921, as Tskunft had withdrawn its application for membership of the Communist Youth International. Komtsukunft was founded on February 2, 1922, and had about 3,000 members. By March 1922 Komtsukunft was estimated to have 3,500 members, organized in nine district organizations and 65 local units.

The organization had its largest branch in Warsaw, with some 700 members. The Warsaw Committee of Komtsukunft was made up by Kh. Kaplan, Mendl Skrobek, Itsik Kovner, Benyomin ("Yanek") Goldflam, Gitele Rapoport, Aleksander Zatorski, Hershl Goldfinger, Yankele Bibleyzer, Adek Likhtenboym, Efrayim Pinkert and Haline Fefer. Other significant Komtsukunft organizations were those of Warsaw suburbs, Łódź, Siedlce, Radom, Kraków, Lublin, Łomża and Białystok.

Komtsukunft affiliated itself with the Communist Youth International, becoming recognized as a section of the international youth movement. In March–April 1923 Komtsukunft merged into the Young Communist League of Poland.
