= Szydłowiec Town Hall =

Town hall in Szydłowiec

Coordinates: 51°13′26″N 20°51′24″E

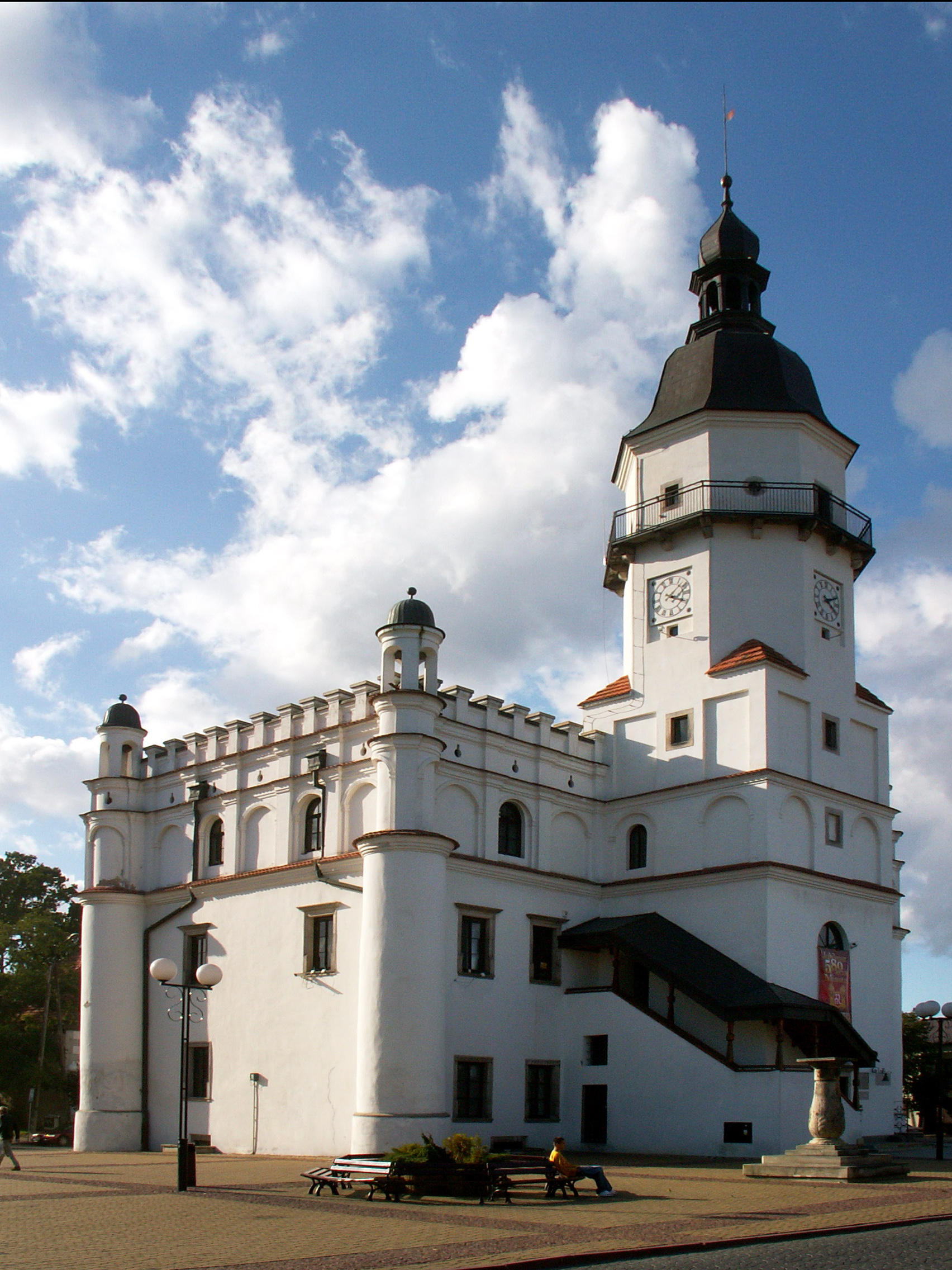
Szydłowiec Town Hall (2007)

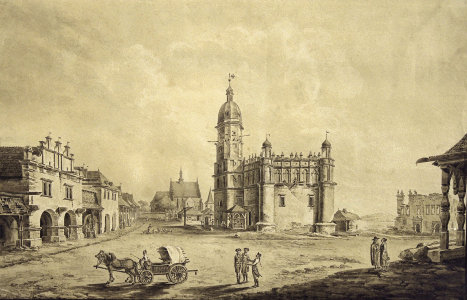
Drawing of the market square by Vogel (1795)

Szydłowiec Town Hall is a late Renaissance building that is the seat of the mayor and local government administration of Szydłowiec.

== Function ==
The town hall is the seat of the Mayor and The Town Council administration.

== History ==
In the centre of typical medieval town square of Szydłowiec there is a late Renaissance town hall built in 1602–1629. It is counted among the most impressive and precious monuments of Burgher architecture in Poland. Its silhouette resembles to some degree the town hall of Sandomierz. Its noble figure makes the town hall the most characteristic landmark of the town.

In front of the town hall's façade there is the town's historical pillory. It goes back to the first half of the 17th century. Szydłowiec's pillory is a unique monument of the kind in Poland.

== Sources ==
- Łoziński, J. Z. and Wolff, B., eds. (1961). Katalog Zabytków Sztuki w Polsce. Vol. 3. Warsaw: E. Krygier, J. Z. Łoziński.
- Słomińska-Paprocka, D. (2009). Powiat szydłowiecki w województwie mazowieckim. Szydłowiec.
- "Ratusz (Town hall)". (2015). Szydlowiec.pl. Retrieved 30 March 2022.
- "Ratusz (Town hall)". (2020). Zabytek.pl. Retrieved 30 March 2022.
- "Ratusz w Szydłowcu". (2013). Infoturystyka.pl. Retrieved 30 March 2022.
