= Battle of Szydłowiec =

1863 battle in Poland

- Part of the January Uprising
Date	22–23 January 1863
Location	Szydłowiec 51°13′26″N 20°51′26″E
Result	Russian victory

Belligerents
(Poland) Polish insurgents	Russian Empire

Commanders and leaders
Captain August Jasiński; Colonel Marian Langiewicz	Major Rudigier

Casualties and losses
5 dead, several wounded, 3 POWs	24 dead, wounded and POWs
- Location within Poland

The Battle of Szydłowiec took place in the night of 22–23 January 1863, during the January Uprising. It began when Polish insurgents under Captain August Jasiński and Colonel Marian Langiewicz attacked the town of Szydłowiec (Congress Poland), where a garrison of the Imperial Russian Army stayed.

Szydlowiec was defended by an infantry regiment under Major Rudigier. Polish insurgents attacked the town three times, but after initial successes, they were forced to retreat, losing five men. The town eventually remained in Russian hands. After retreating, Langiewicz's unit went to Wąchock.

Five insurgents were killed, several wounded, and three wounded Poles were taken prisoner by the Russians. Among the Polish casualties were high school students. Russian losses totaled 24 killed, wounded or taken prisoner.
