= St Sigismund's Church, Szydlowiec =

Roman Catholic parish church in Szydlowiec, Poland

Coordinates: 51°13′23″N 20°51′27″E

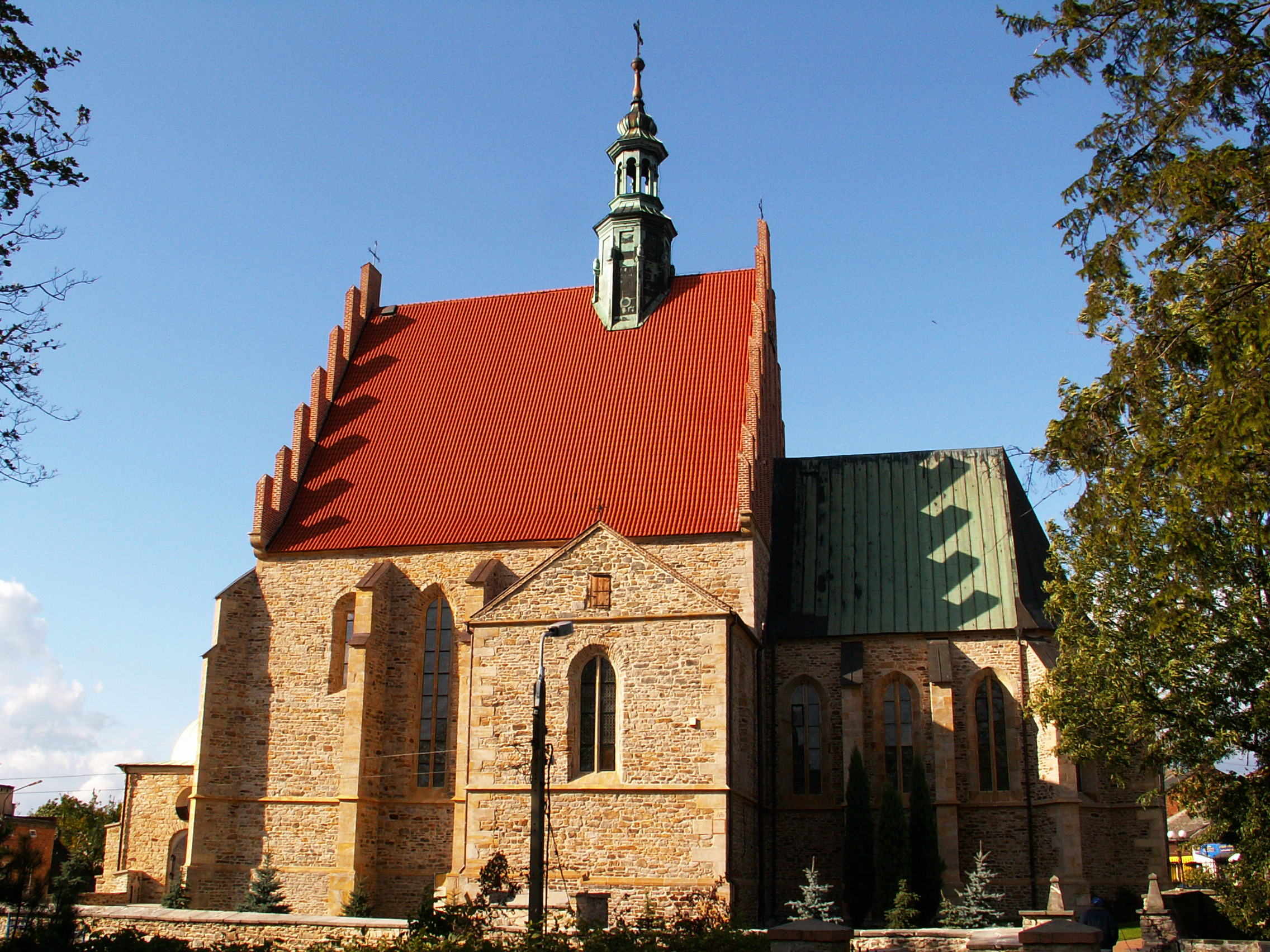
Exterior of St Sigismund's Church, Szydlowiec

Saint Sigismund's Church is a Roman Catholic parish church in Szydłowiec, Poland. It was built towards the close of the Gothic period (the church constitutive act is dated 1 January 1401) and is an example of the late-Gothic hall church.

== History ==
By the Bishop's decree, which was issued on 1st January 1401 on the motion of Jakub Odrowąż and Sławko Odrowąż (later known under the nickname "Szydłowiecki"), the building of Saint Sigismund's Church started. The first church on the site was wooden. In 1493 Jakub Szydłowiecki commenced work to rebuild the church in stone. The building works lasted until 1525 and were completed by Jakub's brother Mikołaj Szydłowiecki. In the 17th century a church bell and tower were added.

== Architecture and features ==
The exterior is of local sandstone. The church faces east and is composed of a three-bay chancel (presbytery) and a rectangular nave. On the northern side of the nave is the St. Stanislaus Chapel and the church vestibule; to the south is a Marian chapel. The chancel adjoins the treasury and vestry to the north.

The church's late-Gothic facade contrasts with its colorful Renaissance interior. The chancel ceiling is lierne or stellar vaulted. The construction plan for the ribbed vaulting was sketched into plaster on the northern wall; this well-preserved building plan was rediscovered during preservation works in the 1970s. The nave's ceiling is not vaulted, but made of larch wood.

In the chancel is located the main altar, from the late Renaissance. On the altar is a sculpture of the Holy Mary being crowned as queen of heaven. There are also paintings of various saints: Saint Augustine, Saint Nicholas, Saint Martin of Tours, John the Baptist, Saint Stanislaus of Szczepanów, Saint Christopher and Saint Florian. Also here is a late-Gothic polyptych showing the Assumption of Mary and Gospel scenes; it was made in 1509 in the workshop of Marcin and Mikołaj Czarny in Kraków.

The top of the nave is ornamented with the Szydłowiecki family coat of arms. Standing in its centre is a figure of Saint Sigismund.

The church's 19th-century organ is used for both sacred and secular purposes..

Around the church is a cemetery, where can be found gravestones and memorial walls of local prominent figures. The memorial wall of Dorota Strzemboszowna is located in the surrounding wall. Another gravestone sculpture is that of a local priest, Kazimierz Owsiany Orłowski, an example of a late Baroque sculpture; it is also ornamented with a sepulchral epitaph. The church's outer southern walls are inscribed with family names and dates of death, which originate from the 16th and 17th centuries; these commemorate people who were buried in the church cemetery.

The burial ground has historic grave monuments by Bartolommeo Berrecci, namely of Mikołaj Szydłowiecki (1480–1532), and of Mikołaj Radziwiłł (1746–1795). The sculpture of a sleeping figure on the memorial of Mikołaj and his wife Maria Radziwiłł (née Gawdzicka) by Giacomo Monaldi was inspired by the Sleeping Ariadne sculpture of antiquity.
