= Lodzsher veker =

Polish Bundist newspaper

- Type: Weekly newspaper (from 1926)
- Political alignment: Left wing
- Language: Yiddish
- Headquarters: Łódź
- Country: Poland

Lodzsher veker (Yiddish: לאדזשער וועקער) was a newspaper of the General Jewish Labour Bund in Łódź, Poland. In 1922, it was taken over by the Jewish Communist Labour Bund. The General Jewish Labour Bund restarted the newspaper in October 1926, as a weekly.
