= Jewish Communist Labour Bund in Poland =

Political party in Poland

- Founded: 1922
- Split from: General Jewish Labour Bund in Poland
- Merged into: KPP
- Ideology: Communism
- Political position: Far-left

The Jewish Communist Labour Bund in Poland (Yiddish: ײדישער קאָמוניסטישנ אַרבעטער בּונד אין פוילין), generally referred to as the Kombund, was a Jewish political party in Poland. It was formed in 1922, after a split from the General Jewish Labour Bund in 1921 (which had seen the emergence of the Kombund fraktsie, 'Communist Bund fraction' inside the Bund). The split was provoked by disagreements over whether the Polish Bund should join the Communist International. At the first Polish Bund conference in 1920 a majority resolution passed, calling for the party to join the Communist International. The decision was never executed however, leading to the split and the formation of Kombund. The Kombund was founded in late January 1922, by Communist Bundist groups. The new party affiliated itself to the Communist International, adopting the twenty-one conditions. Around 25% of the Bund membership in Poland joined the Kombund.

According to one account, around 50% of the Bundist membership in Łódź had joined Kombund. The local Bundist newspaper, Lodzer veker, was taken over by Kombund.

Immediately after the split, the Bund and Kombund began fighting over control of trade unions. Important leaders of the textile, leather and paper workers' unions had sided with the Kombund in the split. The leather workers' union was seized by Kombund, soon to be followed by the clothing workers' union.

Kombund published Unser Gedenk ('Our Thought') from Łódź.

Soon after the foundation of the Kombund, negotiations began with the Communist Party of Poland regarding a merger between the two parties. In September the final decision was taken on the Kombund's merger into the Polish Communist Party. Just before the merger, the Kombund has suffered setbacks in trade union elections in Łódź and Kraków.

Shortly after the merger, the Polish Communist Party established its Central Jewish Bureau.

== See also ==
- Komtsukunft
