= Central Jewish Bureau, Communist Party of Poland =

Central Jewish Bureau, Communist Party of Poland Centralne Biuro Żydowskie
- Ideology: Communism
- Political position: Far-left

The Central Jewish Bureau (Polish: Centralne Biuro Żydowskie, CBŻ) was a Jewish autonomous section inside the Communist Party of Poland. The CBŻ was founded shortly after the Kombund had merged into the Communist Party in 1923. The role of the CBŻ was to mobilize support for the Communist Party amongst the Jewish community. However, not all Jewish party members were part of the CBŻ; assimilated Jewish communists were active in the main Polish party organization.

== See also ==
- Robotniczy Klub Sportowy „Skała"
- Yevsektsia
