= Tsukunft =

Jewish youth organization

Tsukunft or Cukunft or Zukunft (צוקונפֿט, Yiddish for future) was the youth organization of the General Jewish Labor Union (or Bund). It was founded in 1910, and in 1916 it was officially called Yugnt-Bund Tsukunft. Their newspaper was the Yugnt veker. In 1921 Tsukunft suffered a split, in which a pro-Communist group broke away and formed Komtsukunft. Tsukunft had applied for membership in the Communist Youth International two weeks after the Bund had applied for membership in the Communist International, but the second congress of the Communist Youth International had adopted criteria that were not acceptable for Tsukunft.

In 1922 the organization changed its name to Yugnt-bund "Tsukunft" in poyln ('Youth Bund "Tsukunft" in Poland'). By 1924 only seventy active local groups remained in Tsukunft. However, by 1928 it had grown to 171 local groups. At the time of the sixth Tsukunft conference in 1936 (the last before the outbreak of the Second World War), the organization counted with 184 local groups.

On the eve of the Second World War, the organization had 15,000 members. The Tsukunft took part in the Warsaw Ghetto Uprising as part of the Jewish Fighting Organization.

Tsukunft was revived in Poland after the war. At the time it was technically a part of the Polish socialist youth organization Youth Organization of the Workers' University Society (OM TUR).
