= Szydłowiec =

Town in Masovian Voivodeship, Poland

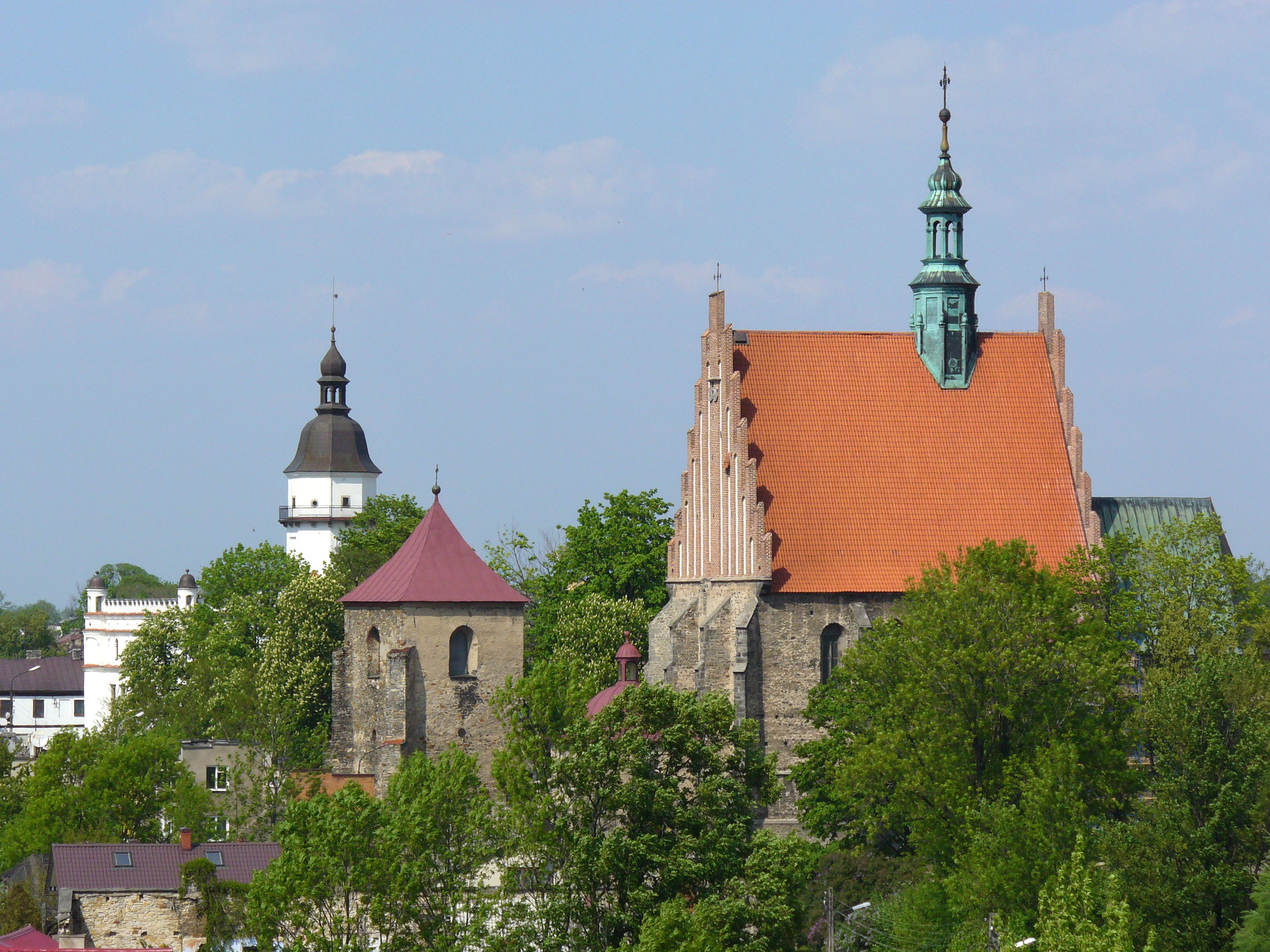
- Panorama of Szydłowiec with the iconic Town Hall on the left and the Saint Sigismund Church on the right

- Coat of arms
- Motto: Dla Boga, Ojczyzny i społeczności For God, Country and community
- Location within Poland
- Coordinates: 51°14′N 20°51′E
- Country: Poland
- Voivodeship: Masovian
- County: Szydłowiec
- Gmina: Szydłowiec
- Established: 12th century
- Town rights: 1427

Government
  - Mayor: Artur Ludew

Area
  - Total: 21.93 km^{2} (8.47 sq mi)
- Elevation: 260 m (850 ft)

Population (2006)
  - Total: 2,030
  - Density: 92.6/km^{2} (240/sq mi)
- Time zone: UTC+1 (CET)
  - Summer (DST): UTC+2 (CEST)
- Postal code: 26–500
- Area code: +48 48
- Car plates: WSZ
- Website: http://www.szydlowiec.pl

Szydłowiec (Polish: [ʂɨˈdwɔvjɛt͡s]; Yiddish: שידלאָווצע, romanized: Shidlovtse) is a town in Szydłowiec County, Mazovian Voivodeship, south-central Poland, with 11,837 inhabitants (31 December 2017). It is the seat of Gmina Szydłowiec (commune). Szydłowiec is part of the historic region of Lesser Poland.

== History ==
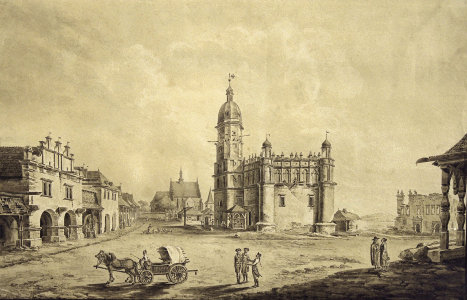
Szydłowiec in the 18th century; by Zygmunt Vogel.

From the 12th century the environs of Szydłowiec belonged to the powerful knightly family of Odrowąż, who were descended from Moravian-Bohemian Baworowic family.

In the 13th century the site of the present castle was occupied by a stronghold on an artificial island with wood and earth defences and by a village called Szydłowiec. The present town came into being in the early 15th century. It was a private town, administratively located in the Radom County in the Sandomierz Voivodeship in the Lesser Poland Province of the Kingdom of Poland, and together with the neighbouring estate was the property of the Szydłowiecki and Radziwiłł families until the 19th century.

The town flourished in the 16th and the first half of 17th centuries. It was then an important centre of trade and crafts, mainly stone-masonry based on the exploitation of the local sandstone which was easy to work. This stone was used to carve architectural sculptural elements and to make tools for agriculture. It was also a building material for the local Saint Sigismund Church, Castle and the Town Hall; moreover, it was sent to Kielce, Kraków and Warsaw. Among the goods traded in were agricultural products.

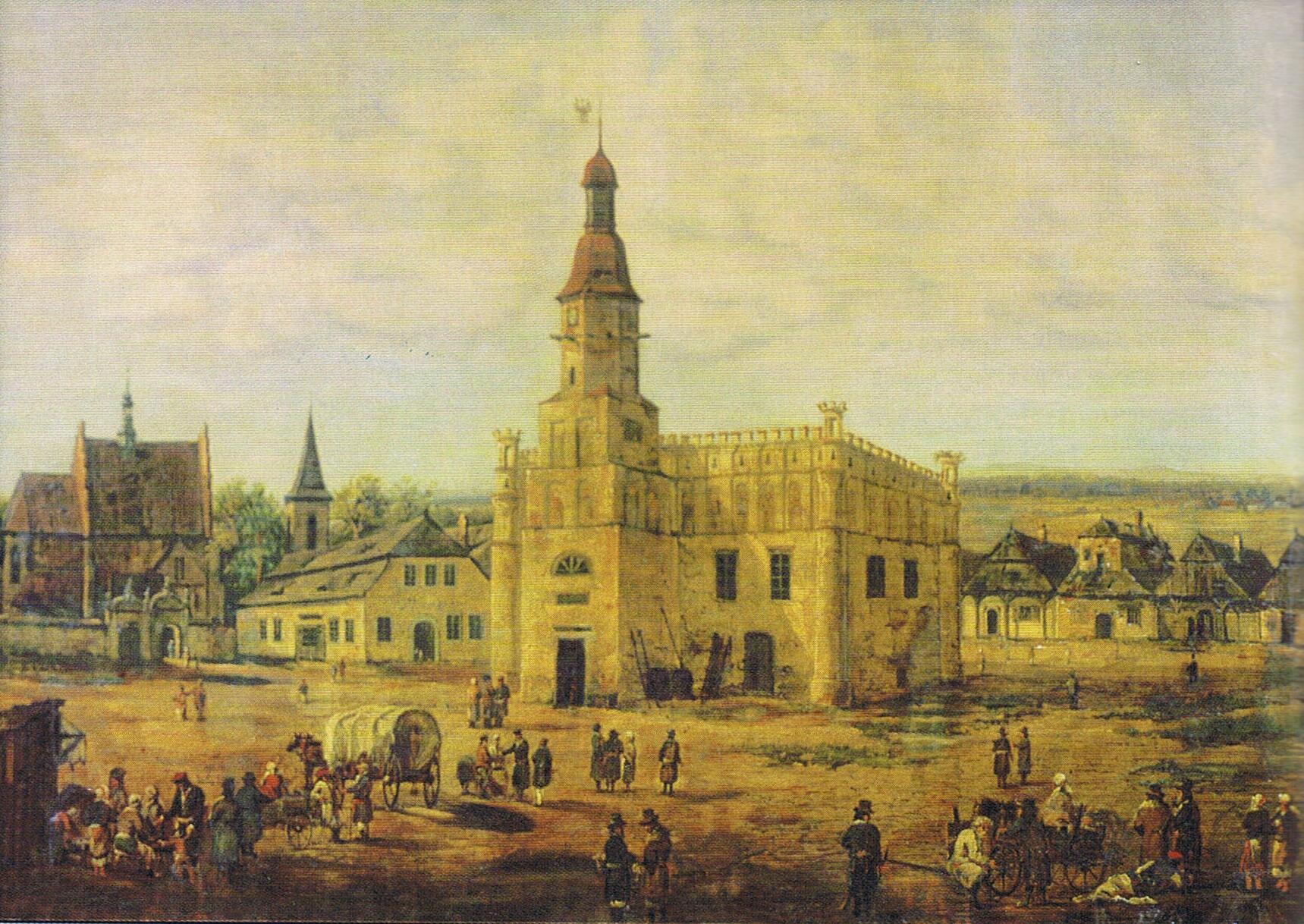
Szydłowiec in the 19th century, by Józef Szermentowski

The period of wars 1648–1717 and numerous epidemics and fires brought about a decline of Szydłowiec, which persisted for centuries, its state being yet aggravated after the partitions of Poland. The town owes this present character to transformations in urban design and architecture which took place in the second half of the 19th century and in the 20th century.

The town was annexed by Austria in the Third Partition of Poland in 1795. It was regained by Poles following the Austro–Polish War of 1809, and included within the short-lived Duchy of Warsaw. After the duchy's dissolution, in 1815, it fell to the Russian Partition of Poland. On 22–23 January 1863 it was the site of the Battle of Szydłowiec between Polish insurgents and Russian troops during the January Uprising. After World War I, in 1918, Poland regained independence and control of the town.

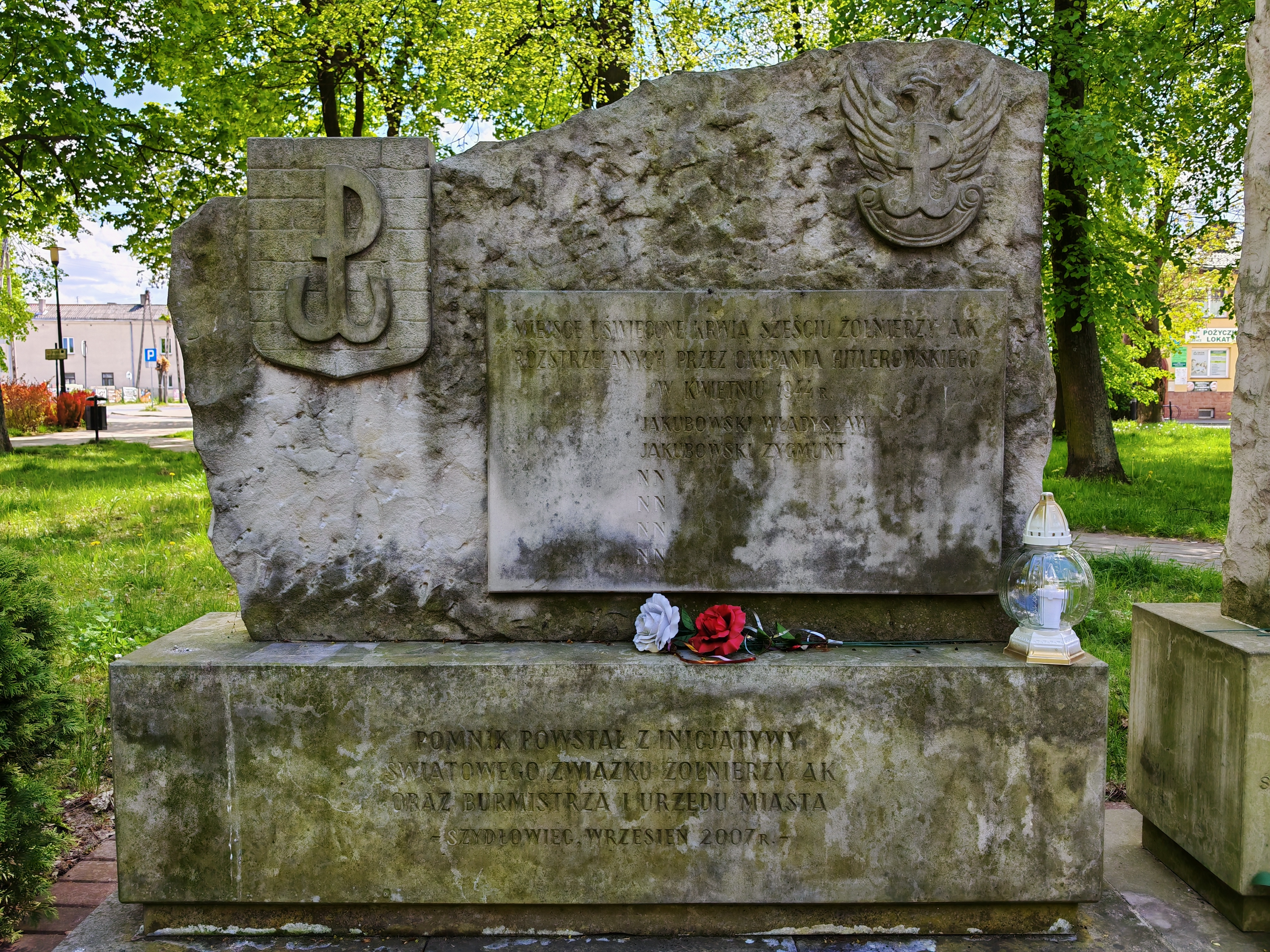
Memorial at the site of a German execution of six Polish partisans in 1944

Following the invasion of Poland, which started World War II in September 1939, the town was occupied by Germany until 1945. The occupiers carried out deportations of Jews to forced labour, and eventually the local Jewish community was destroyed by the Germans in the Holocaust. Polish villagers took advantage of the disorder to plunder the belongings of the Jews in Szydłowiec. There are known cases of local Poles who were arrested and sent to concentration camps by the Germans for producing and giving false identity cards to Jews to save them from the Holocaust. Also Jews escaping from Kozienice were directed to Szydłowiec in order to get help from local Poles.

At one point it had a population that was of a Jewish majority. It was home to Grand Rabbi Natan David Rabinowitz (d. 1865), the grandson of Grand Rabbi Yaakov Yitzchak Rabinowicz of Peshischa, and the father of the Biala Hasidic dynasty.

After German occupation ended, the town was restored to Poland, although with a Soviet-installed communist regime, which stayed in power until the Fall of Communism in the 1980s. The Polish anti-communist resistance was active in Szydłowiec, and on 1 June 1946, the Home Army Resistance Movement and Freedom and Independence Association took control of the town.

It was administratively located in the Radom Voivodeship from 1975 to 1998.

== Sports ==
The local football team is Szydłowianka Szydłowiec. It competes in the lower leagues.

== Gallery ==
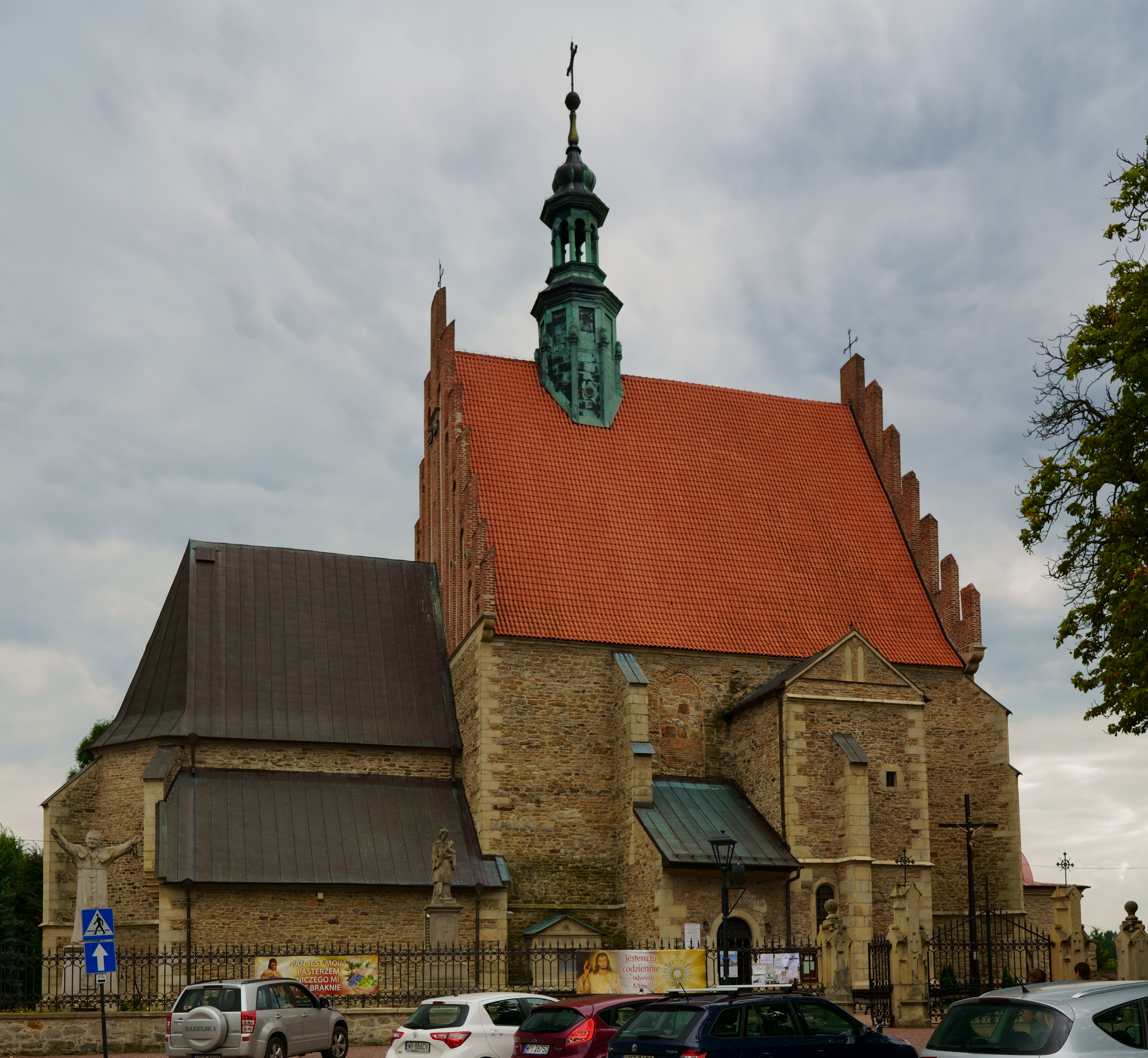
Saint Sigismund Church

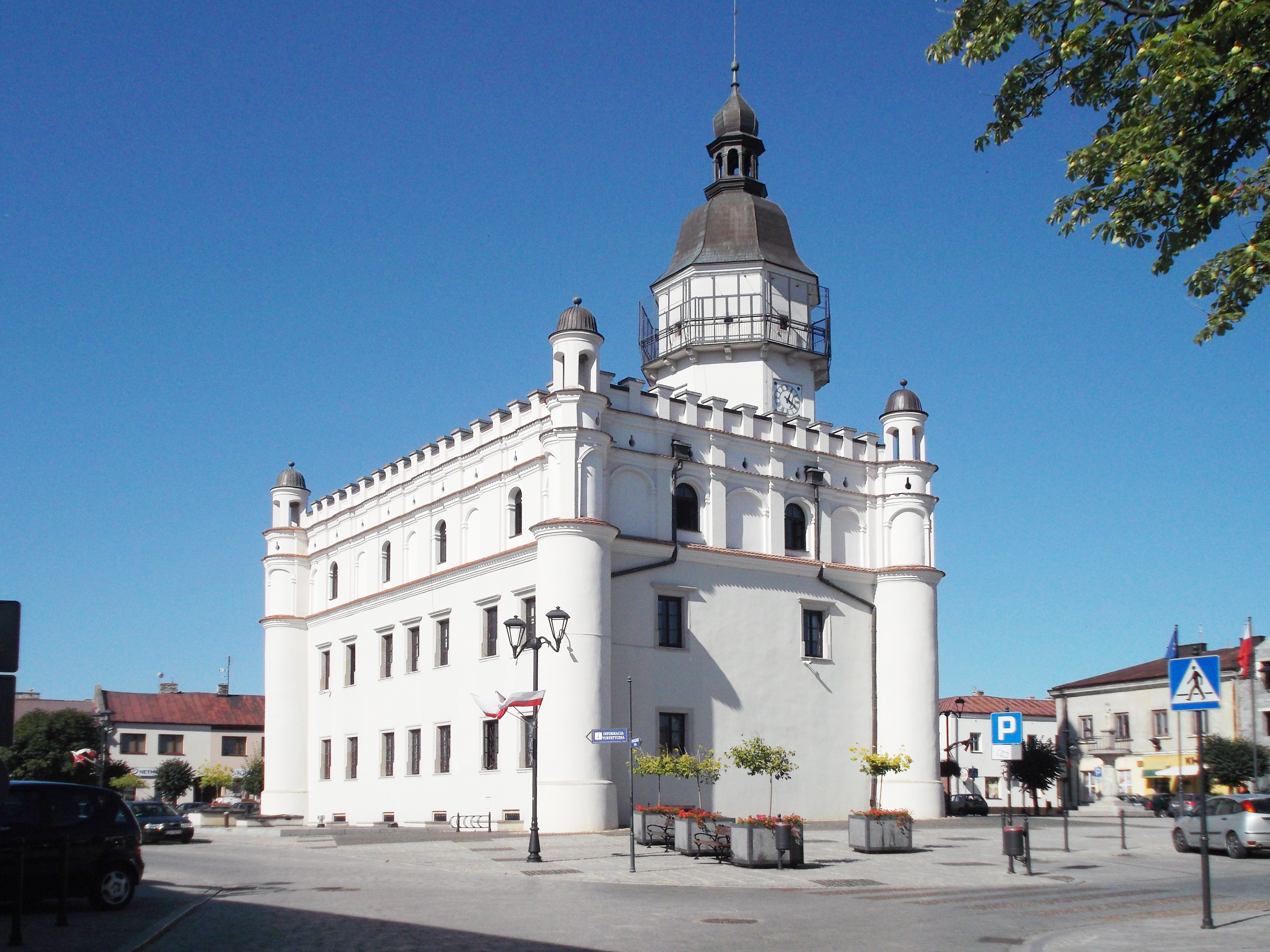
Szydłowiec Town Hall

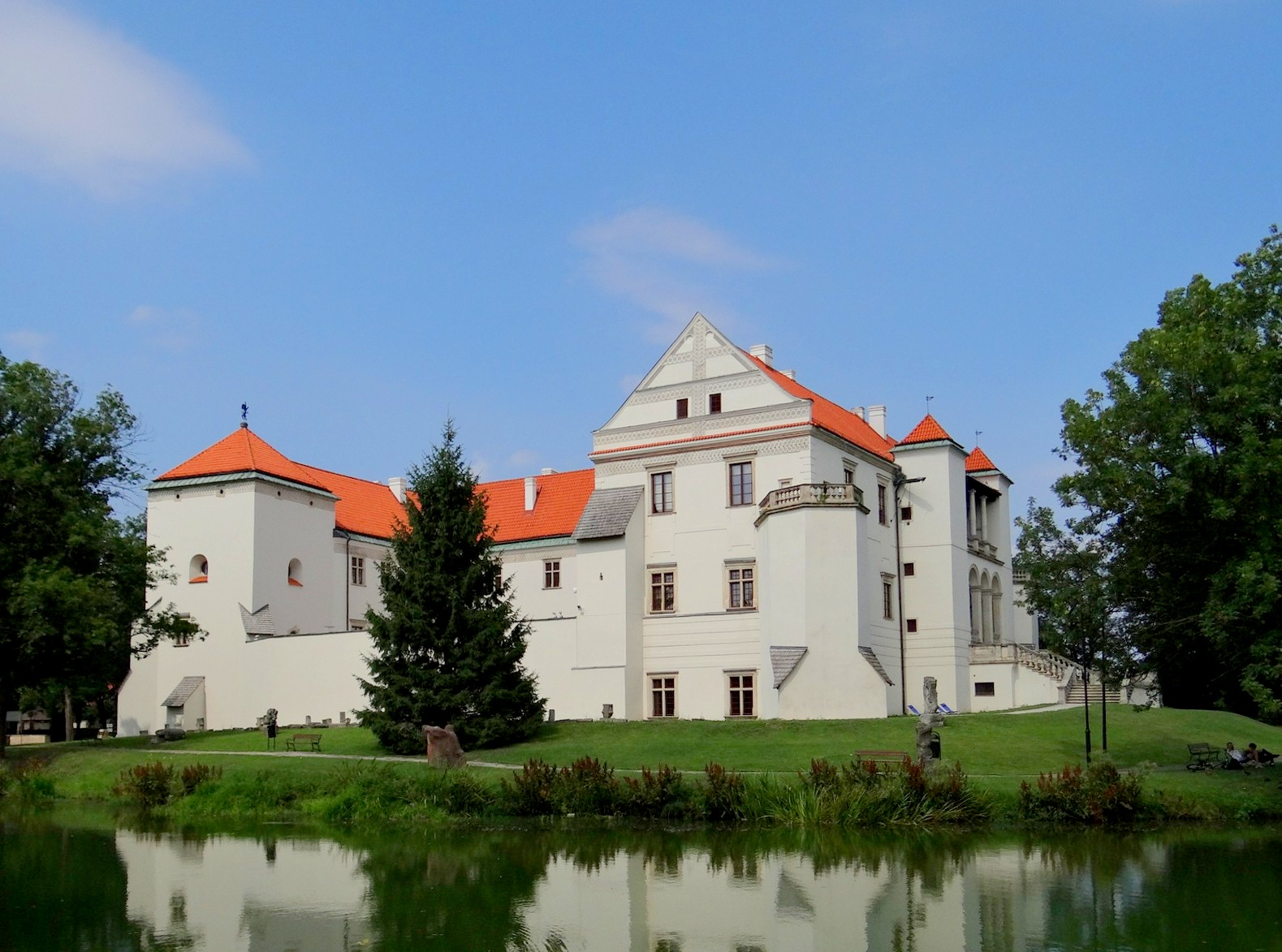
Castle

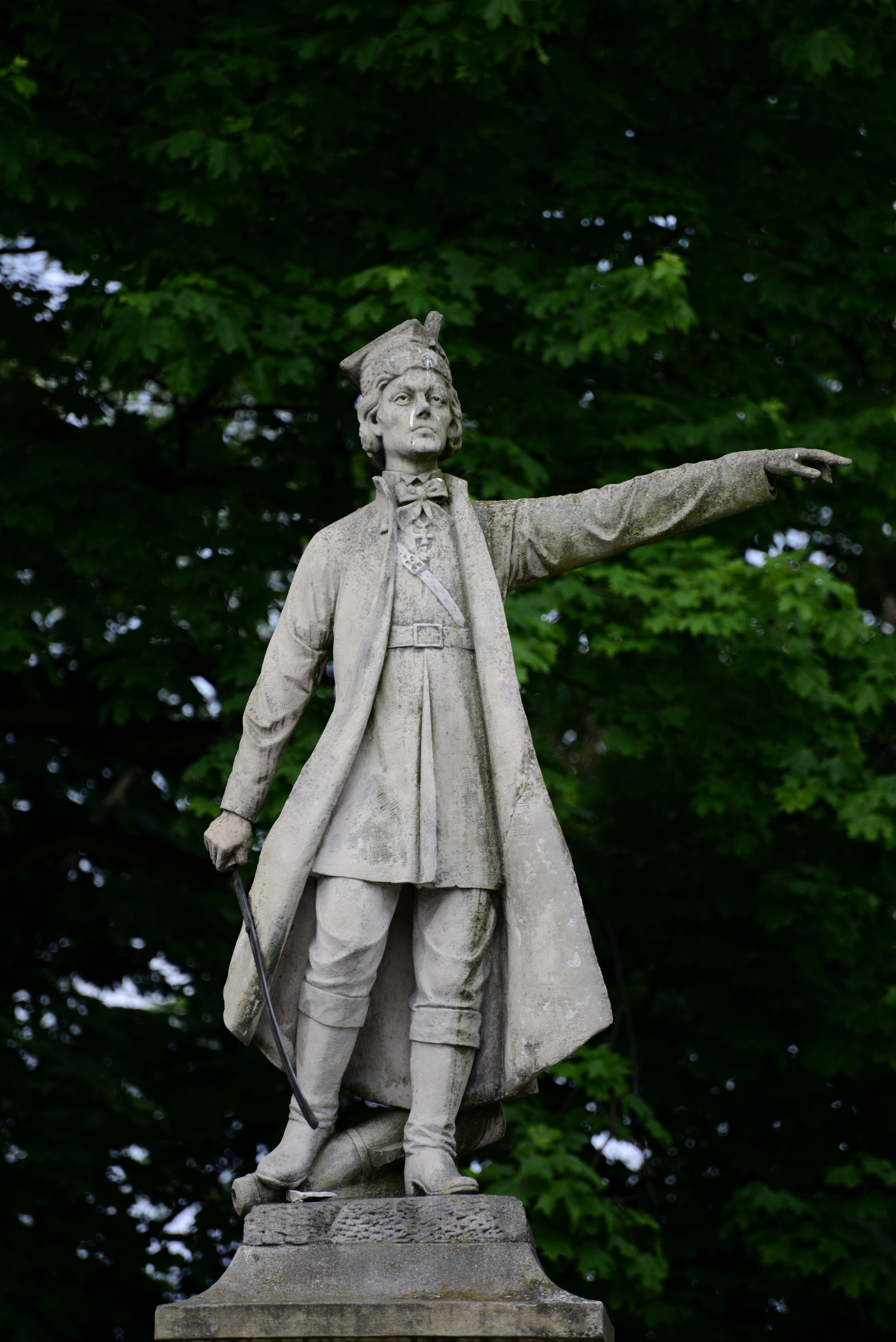
Tadeusz Kościuszko monument

== See also ==
- History of Jews in Szydłowiec
