= Kuźnia =

Kuźnia most often refers to:

- Kuźnia, Greater Poland Voivodeship
- Kuźnia, Masovian Voivodeship

It may also refer to the following places in Poland:

- Dębska Kuźnia, a village in Opole Voivodeship
- Domaradzka Kuźnia, a village in Opole Voivodeship
- Kolonia Kuźnia, a village in Masovian Voivodeship
- Kuźnia Goszczańska, a village in Lower Silesian Voivodeship
- Kuźnia Nieborowska, a village in Silesian Voivodeship
- Kuźnia Raciborska, a town in Silesian Voivodeship
- Ligota-Ligocka Kuźnia, a district of Rybnik, Silesian Voivodeship
- Nowa Kuźnia (disambiguation), several villages
- Stara Kuźnia, Opole Voivodeship
