= Chronów =

Chronów may refer to the following places in Poland:

- Chronów, Lesser Poland Voivodeship
- Chronów, Masovian Voivodeship
- Chronów-Kolonia Dolna
- Chronów-Kolonia Górna
