= Zygmuntów, Szydłowiec County =

Zygmuntów
- Part of Omięcin
- Location within Poland
- Coordinates: 51°25′N 20°35′E
- Country: Poland
- Voivodeship: Masovian
- County: Szydłowiec
- Gmina: Szydłowiec

Zygmuntów (Polish: [zɘ̟ɡˈmun.tuf]) is a neighbourhood of the village of Omięcin, located in Masovian Voivodeship, Poland, in the municipality of Szydłowiec, Szydłowiec County.

== History ==
Zygmuntów was officially given the status of the town in 1775, and lost it around 1808. Currently, it is a part of the village of Omięcin, located in Masovian Voivodeship, Poland.
