= Podaga =

Polabian deity who had his statue in a temple in Plön

- Venerated in: Polabian religion
- Major cult center: Plön
- Texts: Chronica Slavorum
- Region: Polabia

Podaga (also Latin: Pogaga, Pogada) is a Polabian deity who had his statue in a temple in Plön. Mentioned only in Helmold's Chronicle, which does not give a depiction or function of the deity.

Among the Slavs there are many modes of idolatry and not all of them coincide with the same kind of superstition. Some create in their temples statues of fantastic forms, such as the idol of Plön, who is called Podaga, others live in forests and groves, as is the case of the god Prone of Oldenburg, of whom no image exists.

Latin original text
Est autem Slauis multiplex ydolatriae modus, non enim omnes in eandem supersticionis consuetudinem consentiunt. Hii enim simulachrorum ymaginarias formas pretendunt de templis, ueluti Plunense ydolum, cui nomen Pogada, alii siluas uel lucos inhabitant, ut est Prone deus Aldenburg, quibus nullae sunt effigies expressae.

According to Aleksander Brückner, it is impossible to read the name Podaga. Grigoriy Il'inskiy concluded that Podaga is another form of Dazhbog (from *Podabog), while Roman Jakobson concluded that Podaga is a corrupted notation of Dazhbog.

Mikołaj Rudnicki connected the Podaga notation with the name Dagome in Dagome iudex referring to Mieszko I. According to him, both words are related to each other. The word was supposed to have come to the Piast state through Mieszko's unknown wife, who brought with her the cult of the goddess Podaga. He connected both names with the Proto-Slavic *dag- "to burn", and also with Długosz's Pogoda, whose name was supposed to have been distorted.

Leszek Moszyński was the first to link Podaga with the Polish word potęga "power, might". According to him, the stem -dag- corresponds to the Proto-Slavic *tǫgъ "strong, stout", and the whole Latin notation Podaga corresponds to the Proto-Slavic *Potǫga, and the deity would be a divinized power, might (identical to adjective *potǫga "power, might"). Krzysztof Tomasz Witczak commented positively on this reading in his article on the reading of the Latin name Dagome from Dagome iudex. He reads Dag- in Dagome also as Polish Tęg- (PS *Tǫg-), and the whole name as Tęgomir, or the abbreviation from this name, Tęgom (PS *Tǫgomirъ, *Tǫgomъ). He refers to the examples of transcription of the nasal o (Polish ą) by the letter a in German records, e.g. Dabe ← Polish Dąbie, as well as fluctuations between d and t when typing Slavic ⟨d⟩, e.g. the name Oda in Dagome iudex is noted as Ote.

This etymology was supported by Michał Łuczyński. He reminds us of Brückner's remark that the theonym given by Helmold must refer to a male deity, not a female one, since otherwise he would have called the deity dea (Latin "goddess"), and not just idolum, and this means that the final -a in Podaga requires explanation. The final vowel -a sometimes appeared after the preceding consonant ⟨k⟩, e.g., Latin Misaca, Misica, Misuka ← Polish Mieszek, Latin *Licica ← Polish *Leszek, from which it can be concluded that -a may also have appeared after the consonant ⟨g⟩. With this in mind, and taking into account and supporting the reading of the Latin -dag- as -tęg-/*-tǫg-, Łuczyński reads the Proto-Slavic form of theonym as *Potǫgъ. This is supported by the Old Polish personal name *Potąg, reconstructed on the basis of the village of Potęgowo, as well as the personal name *Nietąg (name with negation) from the 13th century.

According to Henryk Łowmiański the cult of Podaga was a cult arranged by prince Kruto and not a tribal cult, because the creation of an independent deity, erecting a temple and a statue of him would have exceeded the capabilities of a small territorial unit. According to Łuczyński, the new temple (probably dedicated to a new god) was supposed to raise the authority of the prince's power. According to him, Potag should therefore be considered an epithet of Perun, which would have a Rus' analogy in the form of the creation of an official state cult established in Kyiv by Vladimir the Great. Potag would thus originally have been a given name, and as an adjective of the deity it was eventually recognized as a separate theonym, at first as an alternate name for Perun.

== Bibliography ==
- Alvarez-Pedroza, Juan Antonio (2021). Sources of Slavic Pre-Christian Religion. Leiden: Koninklijke Brill. ISBN 978-90-04-44138-5.
- Brückner, Aleksander (1985). Mitologia słowiańska (in Polish). Warsaw: Państwowe Wydawnictwo Naukowe. ISBN 8301062452.
- Il'inskiy, Grigoriy (1932). "Podaga". Mélanges de Philologie offerts à M.J.J. Mikkola, professeur de philologie slave à l'Université de Helsinki, à l'occasion de son soixante-cinquième anniversaire le 6 juillet 1931, par ses amis et ses élèves. Annales Academiae scientiarum Fennicae, Series B. Vol. 27. Helsinki.
- Jakobson, Roman (1985). Selected Writings. Vol. VII. Contributions to comparative mythology. Studies in linguistics and philology, 1972–1982 (2 ed.). Mouton. ISBN 978-0-89925-051-9.
- Łowmiański, Henryk (1979). Religia Słowian i jej upadek, w. VI-XII (in Polish). Warsaw: Państwowe Wydawnictwo Naukowe. ISBN 83-01-00033-3.
- Łuczyński, Michał (2020). Bogowie dawnych Słowian. Studium onomastyczne (in Polish). Kielce: Kieleckie Towarzystwo Naukowe. ISBN 978-83-60777-83-1.
- Moszyński, Leszek (1992). Die vorchristliche Religion der Slaven im Lichte der slavischen Sprachwissenschaft (in German). Cologne, Weimar, Vienna: Böhlau. ISBN 978-3-412-08591-9.
- Rudnicki, Mikołaj (1928). "Pols. Dagome i wagryjska Podaga". Slavia Occidentalis (in Polish). 7: 135–165.
- Rudnicki, Mikołaj (1963). "Dagome iudex". Studia linguistica in honorem Thaddaei Lehr-Spławiński (in Polish). Warsaw: Państwowe Wydawnictwo Naukowe.
- Witczak, Krzysztof Tomasz (1995). "Polonia Antiqua. Głos w dyskusji nad imieniem chrzestnym Mieszka I". Biuletyn Polskiego Towarzystwa Językoznawczego (in Polish). 51: 107–116.
