= Krogulcza =

Krogulcza may refer to the following places in Poland:

- Krogulcza Mokra
- Krogulcza Sucha
