= Guzów, Szydłowiec County =

Guzów
- Village
- Location within Poland
- Coordinates: 51°20′5″N 20°58′5″E
- Country: Poland
- Voivodeship: Masovian
- County: Szydłowiec
- Gmina: Orońsko

Guzów [ˈɡuzuf] is a village in the administrative district of Gmina Orońsko, within Szydłowiec County, Masovian Voivodeship, in east-central Poland.

The Battle of Guzów took place there in 1607.
