= Zygmuntów =

Zygmuntów may refer to:

- Zygmuntów, Łowicz County in Łódź Voivodeship (central Poland)
- Zygmuntów, Łódź East County in Łódź Voivodeship (central Poland)
- Zygmuntów, Pabianice County in Łódź Voivodeship (central Poland)
- Zygmuntów, Radomsko County in Łódź Voivodeship (central Poland)
- Zygmuntów, Wieruszów County in Łódź Voivodeship (central Poland)
- Zygmuntów, Lublin Voivodeship (east Poland)
- Zygmuntów, Świętokrzyskie Voivodeship (south-central Poland)
- Zygmuntów, Przysucha County in Masovian Voivodeship (east-central Poland)
- Zygmuntów, Szydłowiec County in Masovian Voivodeship (east-central Poland)
