= Zastronie =

- Village
- Location within Poland
- Coordinates: 51°17′57″N 20°52′31″E
- Country: Poland
- Voivodeship: Masovian
- County: Szydłowiec
- Gmina: Szydłowiec
- Population: 260

Zastronie [zasˈtrɔɲɛ] is a village in the administrative district of Gmina Szydłowiec, within Szydłowiec County, Masovian Voivodeship, in east-central Poland.
