= Koszorów =

- Village
- Location within Poland
- Coordinates: 51°15′N 20°48′E
- Country: Poland
- Voivodeship: Masovian
- County: Szydłowiec
- Gmina: Chlewiska
- Population: 142

Koszorów [kɔˈʂɔruf] is a small village in the administrative district of Gmina Chlewiska, within Szydłowiec County, Masovian Voivodeship, in east-central Poland.
