= Mszadla, Masovian Voivodeship =

Mszadla
- Village
- Location within Poland
- Coordinates: 51°16′06″N 20°51′36″E
- Country: Poland
- Voivodeship: Masovian
- County: Szydłowiec
- Gmina: Szydłowiec
- Population: 4

Mszadla [ˈmʂadla] is a village in the administrative district of Gmina Szydłowiec, within Szydłowiec County, Masovian Voivodeship, in east-central Poland.
