= Mirów Stary =

Dęblin
- Village
- Location within Poland
- Coordinates: 51°11′09″N 21°02′35″E
- Country: Poland
- Voivodeship: Masovian
- County: Szydłowiec
- Gmina: Mirów

Mirów Stary [ˈmiruf ˈstarɨ] is a village in the administrative district of Gmina Mirów, within Szydłowiec County, Masovian Voivodeship, in east-central Poland.
