= Ciechostowice =

- Village
- Location within Poland
- Coordinates: 51°10′N 20°47′E
- Country: Poland
- Voivodeship: Masovian
- County: Szydłowiec
- Gmina: Szydłowiec
- Population: 892

Ciechostowice [t͡ɕɛxɔstɔˈvit͡sɛ] is a village in the administrative district of Gmina Szydłowiec, within Szydłowiec County, Masovian Voivodeship, in east-central Poland.
