= Gąsawy Plebańskie =

- Village
- Location within Poland
- Coordinates: 51°14′N 20°57′E
- Country: Poland
- Voivodeship: Masovian
- County: Szydłowiec
- Gmina: Jastrząb

Gąsawy Plebańskie [ɡɔ̃ˈsavɨ plɛˈbaɲskʲɛ] is a village in the administrative district of Gmina Jastrząb, within Szydłowiec County, Masovian Voivodeship, in east-central Poland.
