= Gąsawy Rządowe-Niwy =

- Village
- Location within Poland
- Coordinates: 51°12′N 20°57′E
- Country: Poland
- Voivodeship: Masovian
- County: Szydłowiec
- Gmina: Jastrząb

Gąsawy Rządowe-Niwy [ɡɔ̃ˈsavɨ ʐɔnˈdɔvɛ ˈnivɨ] is a village in the administrative district of Gmina Jastrząb, within Szydłowiec County, Masovian Voivodeship, in east-central Poland.
