= Gozdków, Masovian Voivodeship =

Gozdków
- Village
- Location within Poland
- Coordinates: 51°19′31″N 20°51′53″E
- Country: Poland
- Voivodeship: Masovian
- County: Szydłowiec
- Gmina: Orońsko

Gozdków [ˈɡɔstkuf] is a village in the administrative district of Gmina Orońsko, within Szydłowiec County, Masovian Voivodeship, in east-central Poland.
