= Dobrut =

- Village
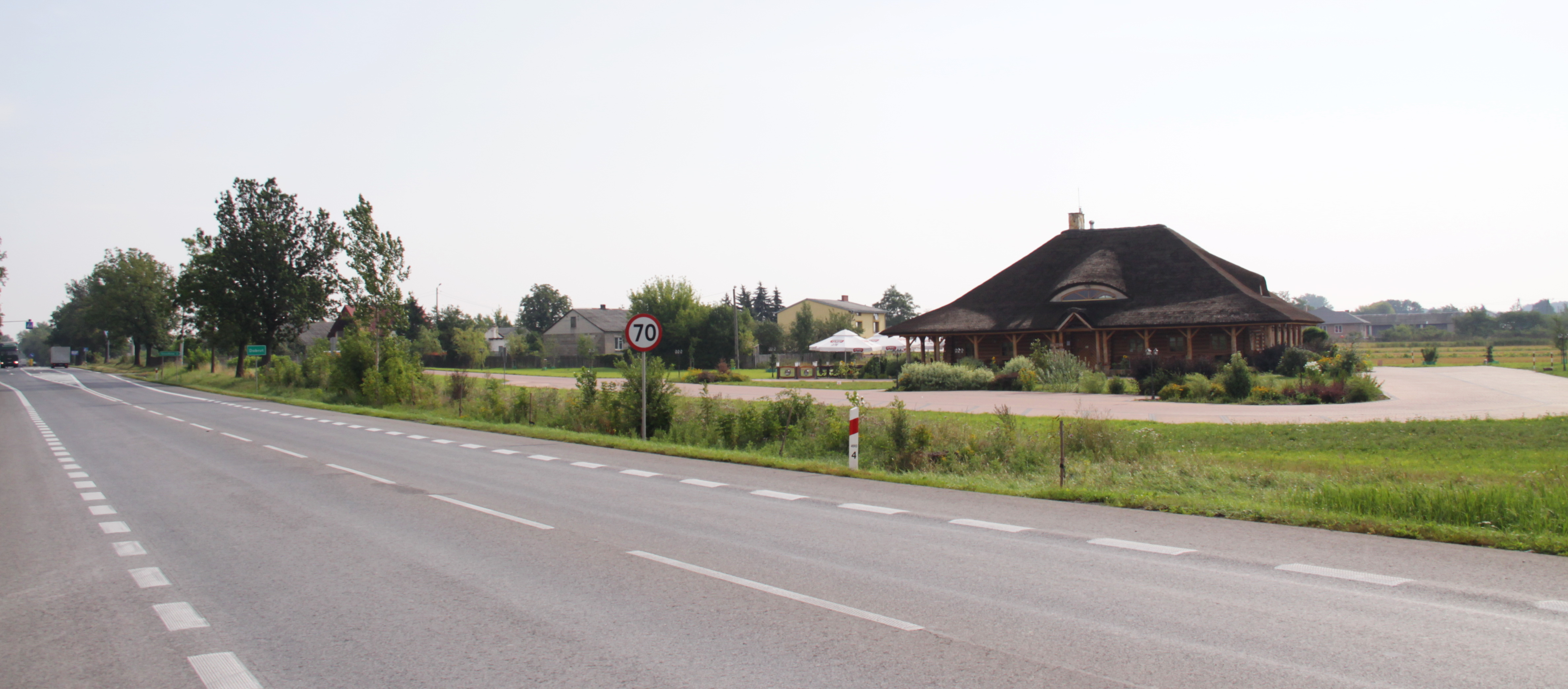

- Location within Poland
- Coordinates: 51°18′N 20°59′E
- Country: Poland
- Voivodeship: Masovian
- County: Szydłowiec
- Gmina: Orońsko
- Population: 370

Dobrut [ˈdɔbrut] is a village in the administrative district of Gmina Orońsko, within Szydłowiec County, Masovian Voivodeship, in east-central Poland.
