= Zawonia =

Zawonia may refer to the following places in Poland:

- Zawonia, Lower Silesian Voivodeship (south-west Poland)
- Zawonia, Masovian Voivodeship (east-central Poland)
