= Marywil, Masovian Voivodeship =

Marywil
- Village
- Location within Poland
- Coordinates: 51°15′36″N 20°50′46″E
- Country: Poland
- Voivodeship: Masovian
- County: Szydłowiec
- Gmina: Szydłowiec

Population
  - Total: 21

Marywil [maˈrɨvil] is a village in the administrative district of Gmina Szydłowiec, within Szydłowiec County, Masovian Voivodeship, in east-central Poland.
