= Rogów, Szydłowiec County =

Rogów
- Village
- Location within Poland
- Coordinates: 51°12′N 21°1′E
- Country: Poland
- Voivodeship: Masovian
- County: Szydłowiec
- Gmina: Mirów

Rogów [ˈrɔɡuf] is a village in the administrative district of Gmina Mirów, within Szydłowiec County, Masovian Voivodeship, in east-central Poland.
