= Stanisławów, Gmina Chlewiska =

Stanisławów
- Village
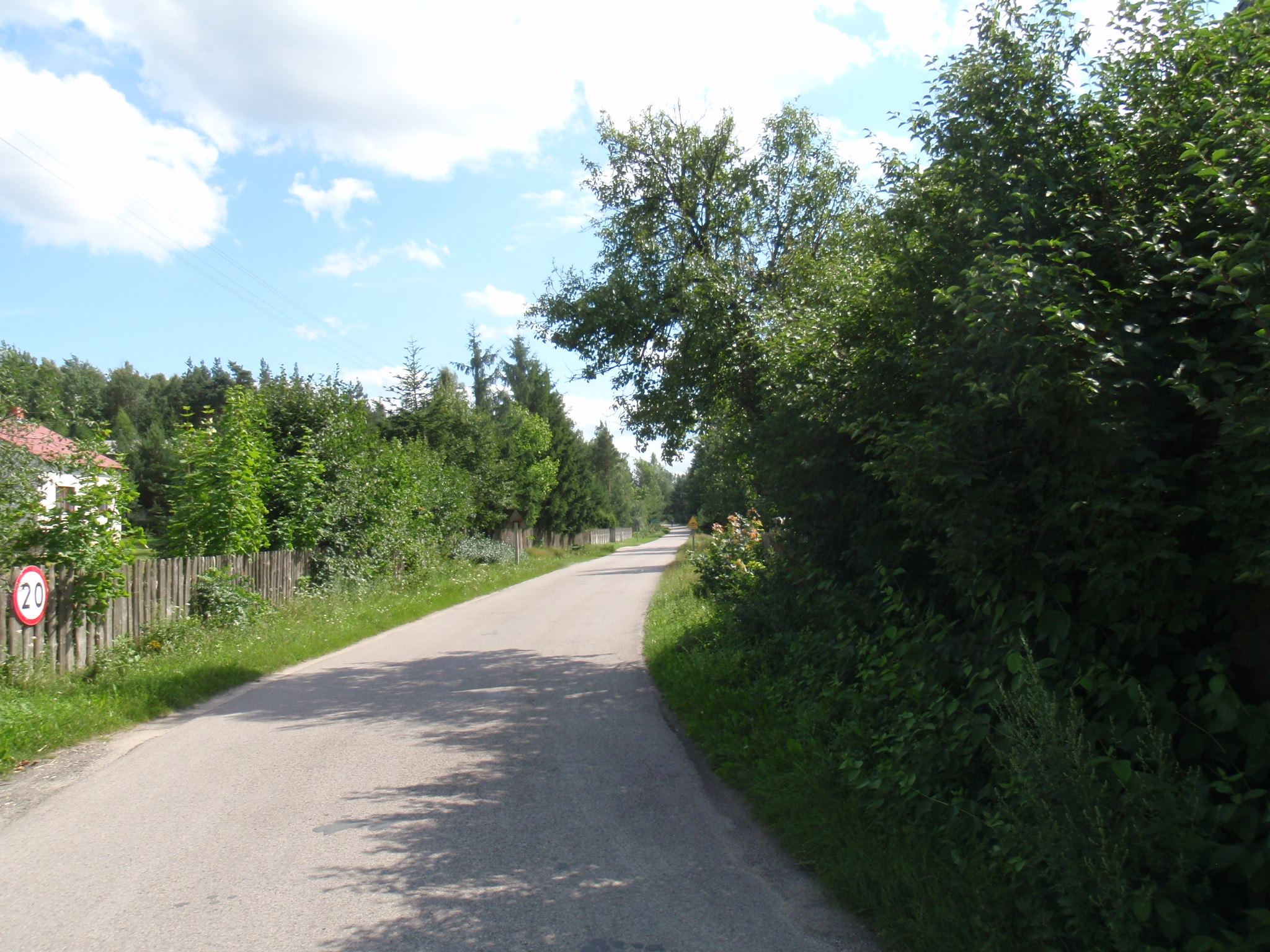

- Location within Poland
- Coordinates: 51°14′34″N 20°47′19″E
- Country: Poland
- Voivodeship: Masovian
- County: Szydłowiec
- Gmina: Chlewiska

Population
  - Total: 90
- Time zone: UTC+1 (CET)
  - Summer (DST): UTC+2 (CEST)
- Vehicle registration: WSZ

Stanisławów [staniˈswavuf] is a village in the administrative district of Gmina Chlewiska, within Szydłowiec County, Masovian Voivodeship, in east-central Poland.

== History ==
Three Polish citizens were murdered by Nazi Germany in the village during World War II.
