= Zdziechów, Szydłowiec County =

Zdziechów
- Village
- Location within Poland
- Coordinates: 51°16′31″N 20°54′17″E
- Country: Poland
- Voivodeship: Masovian
- County: Szydłowiec
- Gmina: Szydłowiec
- Population: 575

Zdziechów [ˈzd͡ʑɛxuf] is a village in the administrative district of Gmina Szydłowiec, within Szydłowiec County, Masovian Voivodeship, in east-central Poland.
