= Helenów, Szydłowiec County =

Helenów
- Village
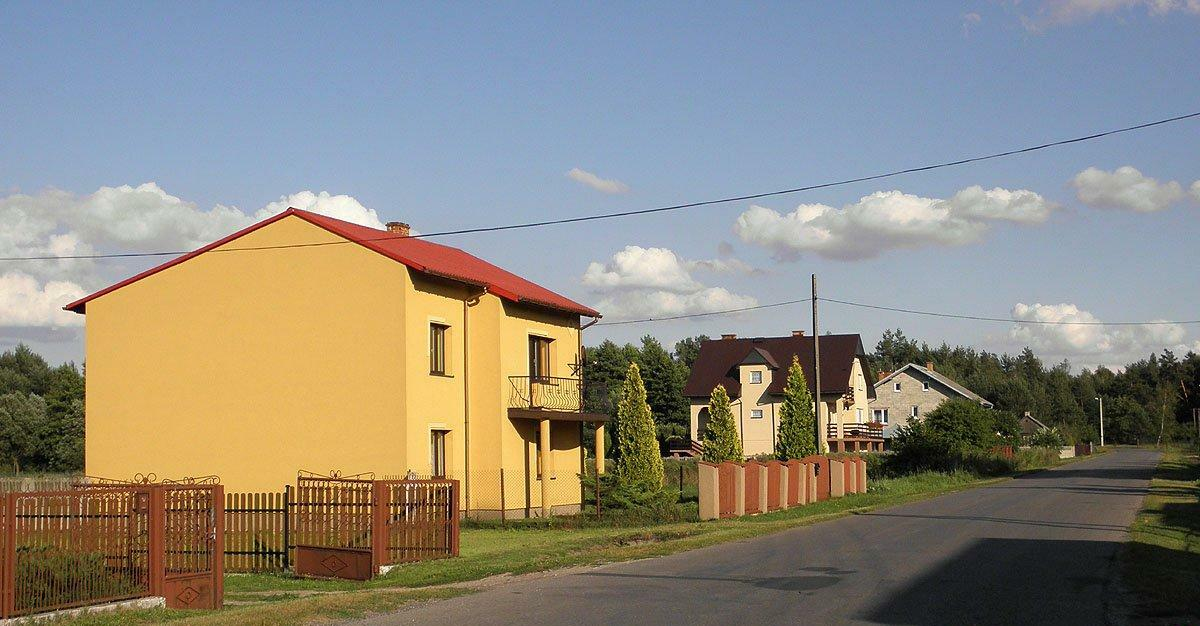

- Location within Poland
- Coordinates: 51°18′12″N 21°01′19″E
- Country: Poland
- Voivodeship: Masovian
- County: Szydłowiec
- Gmina: Orońsko

Helenów [xɛˈlɛnuf] is a village in the administrative district of Gmina Orońsko, within Szydłowiec County, Masovian Voivodeship, in east-central Poland.
