= Orłów, Szydłowiec County =

Orłów
- Village
- Location within Poland
- Coordinates: 51°15′N 20°55′E
- Country: Poland
- Voivodeship: Masovian
- County: Szydłowiec
- Gmina: Jastrząb

Orłów [ˈɔrwuf] is a village in the administrative district of Gmina Jastrząb, within Szydłowiec County, Masovian Voivodeship, in east-central Poland.
