= Chronówek =

- Village
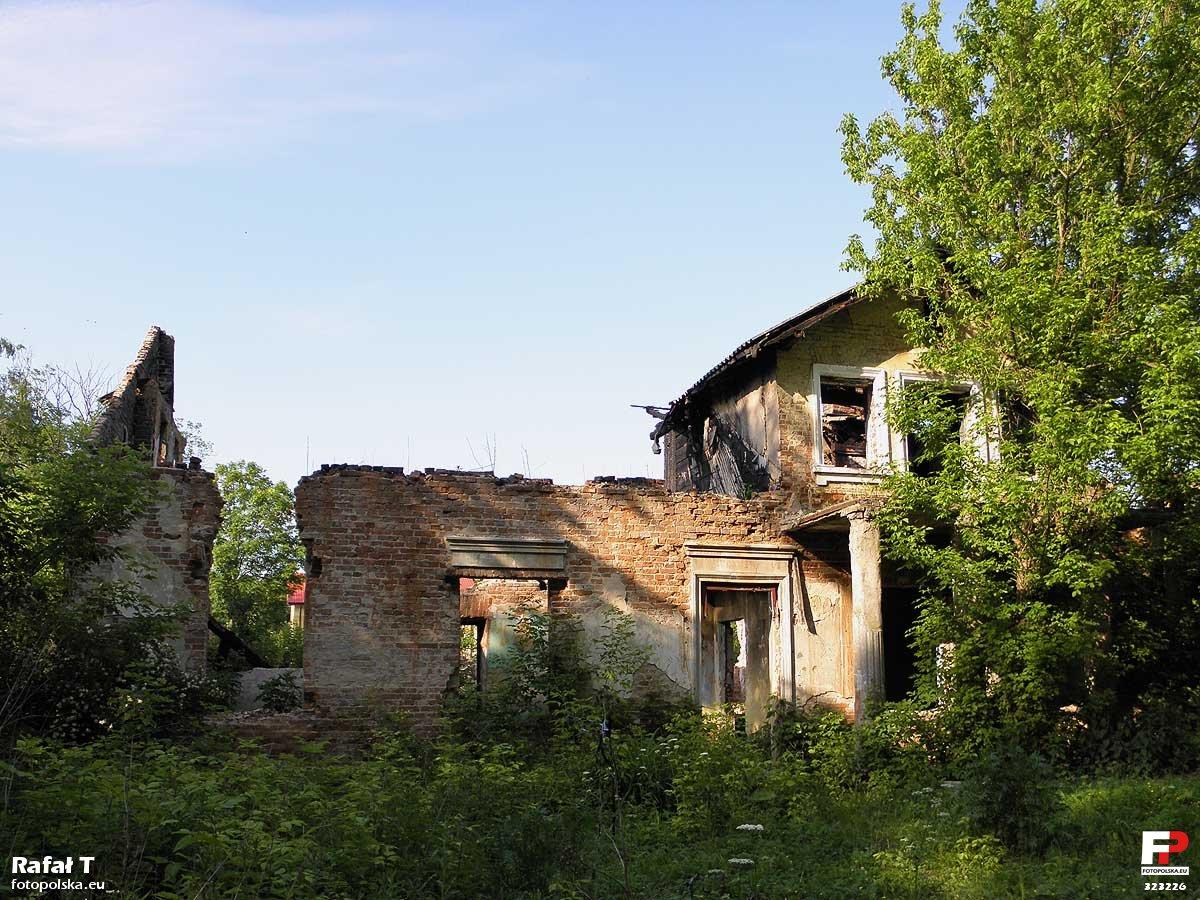
- The ruins of a mansion in Chronówek

- Location within Poland
- Coordinates: 51°21′26″N 20°57′35″E
- Country: Poland
- Voivodeship: Masovian
- County: Szydłowiec
- Gmina: Orońsko
- Population (2021): 100

Chronówek [xrɔˈnuvɛk] is a village in the administrative district of Gmina Orońsko, within Szydłowiec County, Masovian Voivodeship, in east-central Poland. In 2021, the village had a population of 100 people.
