= Gąsawy Rządowe =

- Village
- Location within Poland
- Coordinates: 51°12′N 20°56′E
- Country: Poland
- Voivodeship: Masovian
- County: Szydłowiec
- Gmina: Jastrząb
- Elevation: 240 m (790 ft)
- Population: 1,500

Gąsawy Rządowe [ɡɔ̃ˈsavɨ ʐɔnˈdɔvɛ] is a village in the administrative district of Gmina Jastrząb, within Szydłowiec County, Masovian Voivodeship, in east-central Poland.
