= Nadolna, Masovian Voivodeship =

Nadolna
- Village
- Location within Poland
- Coordinates: 51°15′51″N 20°42′36″E
- Country: Poland
- Voivodeship: Masovian
- County: Szydłowiec
- Gmina: Chlewiska
- Population: 159

Nadolna [naˈdɔlna] is a village in the administrative district of Gmina Chlewiska, within Szydłowiec County, Masovian Voivodeship, in east-central Poland.
