= Ciepła =

- Village
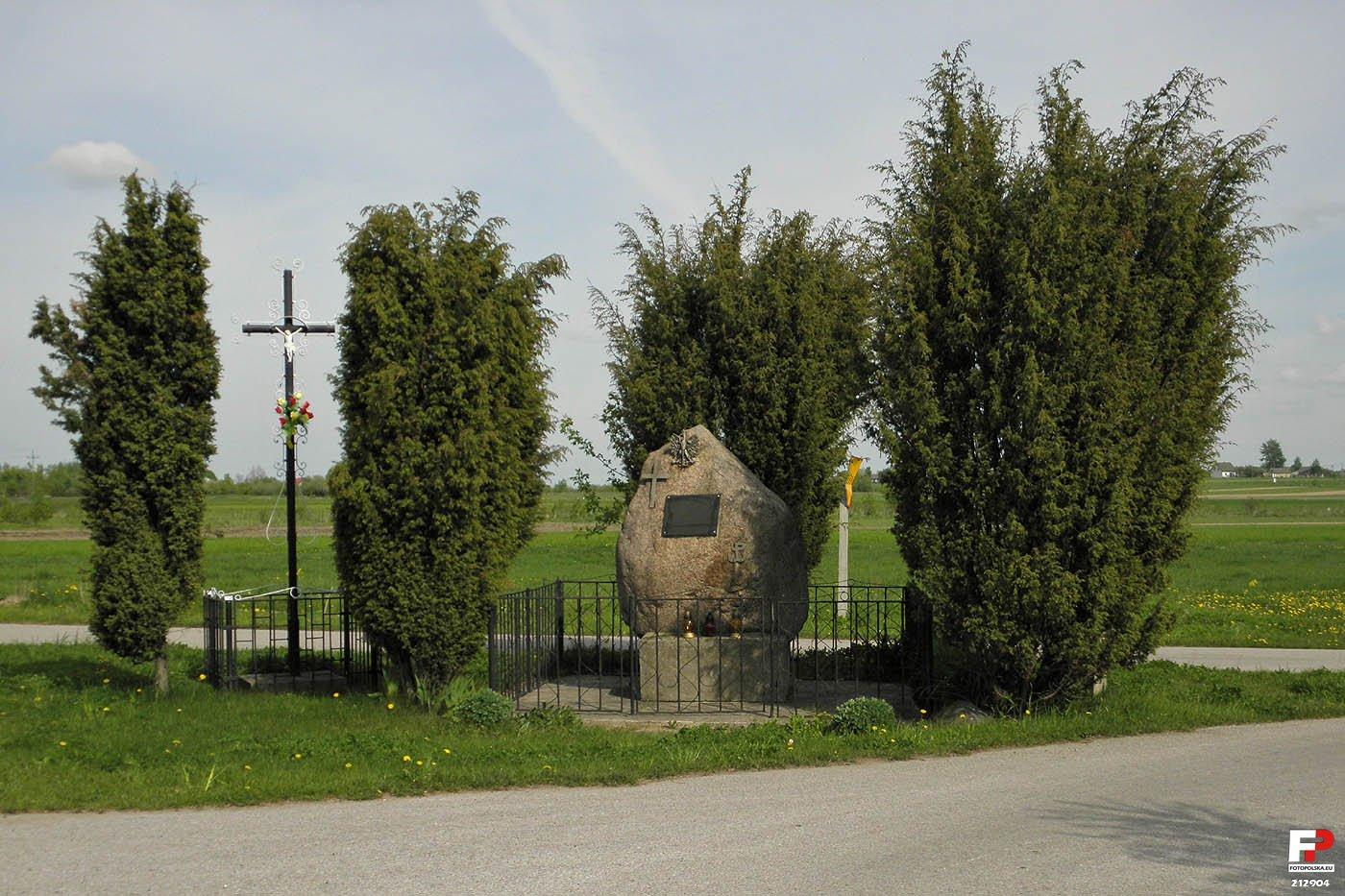

- Location within Poland
- Coordinates: 51°19′N 20°56′E
- Country: Poland
- Voivodeship: Masovian
- County: Szydłowiec
- Gmina: Orońsko
- Time zone: UTC+1 (CET)
  - Summer (DST): UTC+2 (CEST)

Ciepła [ˈt͡ɕɛpwa] is a village in the administrative district of Gmina Orońsko, within Szydłowiec County, Masovian Voivodeship, in south-central Poland.

Five Polish citizens were murdered by Nazi Germany in the village during World War II.
