= Łazy, Szydłowiec County =

Łazy
- Village
- Location within Poland
- Coordinates: 51°9′N 20°48′E
- Country: Poland
- Voivodeship: Masovian
- County: Szydłowiec
- Gmina: Szydłowiec

Population
  - Total: 411
- Time zone: UTC+1 (CET)
  - Summer (DST): UTC+2 (CEST)

Łazy [ˈwazɨ] is a village in the administrative district of Gmina Szydłowiec, within Szydłowiec County, Masovian Voivodeship, in south-central Poland.

Three Polish citizens were murdered by Nazi Germany in the village during World War II.
