= Aleksandrów, Szydłowiec County =

Aleksandrów
- Village
- Location within Poland
- Coordinates: 51°13′N 20°46′E
- Country: Poland
- Voivodeship: Masovian
- County: Szydłowiec
- Gmina: Chlewiska
- Population: 170

Aleksandrów [alɛkˈsandruf] is a village in the administrative district of Gmina Chlewiska, within Szydłowiec County, Masovian Voivodeship, in east-central Poland.

In 2008, the village had a population of 170.
