= Bieszków Dolny =

- Village
- Location within Poland
- Coordinates: 51°12′N 20°58′E
- Country: Poland
- Voivodeship: Masovian
- County: Szydłowiec
- Gmina: Mirów

Bieszków Dolny [ˈbjɛʂkuf ˈdɔlnɨ] is a village in the administrative district of Gmina Mirów, within Szydłowiec County, Masovian Voivodeship, in east-central Poland.
