= Wola Lipieniecka Mała =

- Village
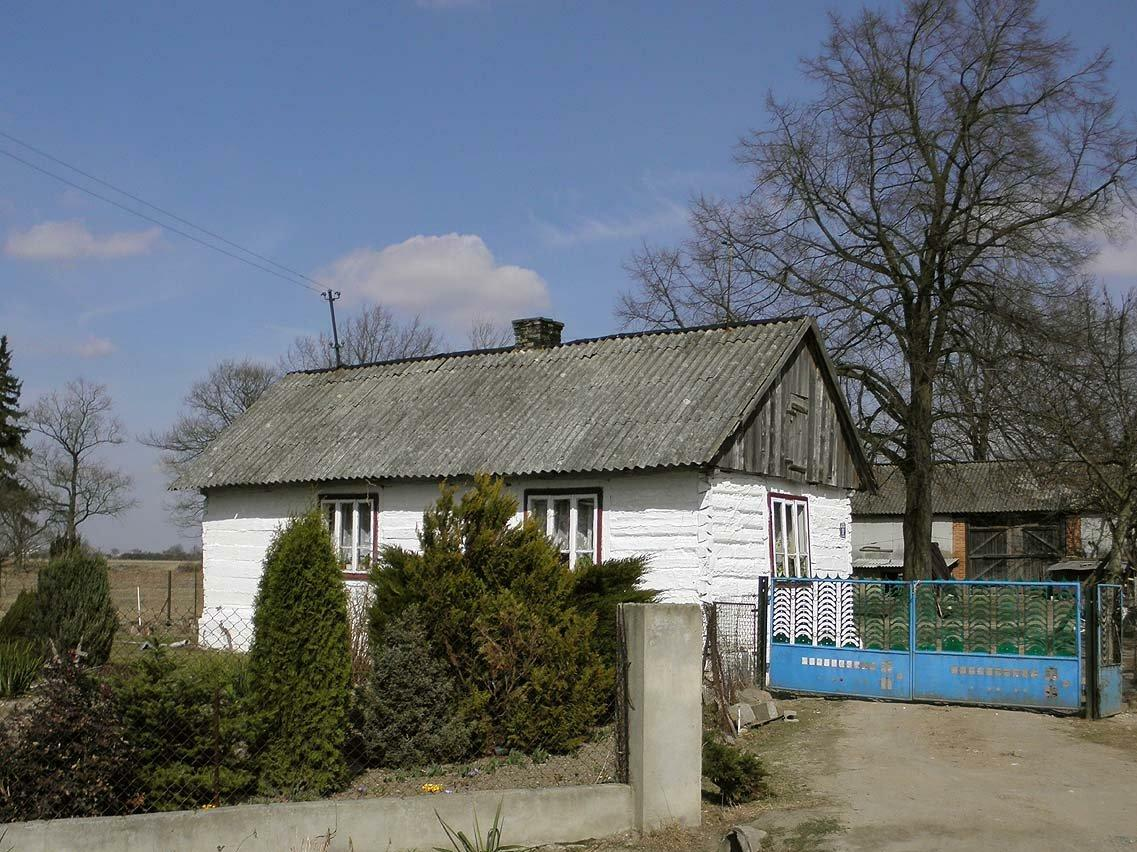
- Street of Wola Lipieniecka Mała village, commune of Jastrząb, Poland

- Location within Poland
- Coordinates: 51°15′32″N 20°59′11″E
- Country: Poland
- Voivodeship: Masovian
- County: Szydłowiec
- Gmina: Jastrząb

Wola Lipieniecka Mała [ˈvɔla lipjɛˈɲɛt͡ska ˈmawa] is a village in the administrative district of Gmina Jastrząb, within Szydłowiec County, Masovian Voivodeship, in east-central Poland.
