= Łaziska, Szydłowiec County =

Łaziska
- Village
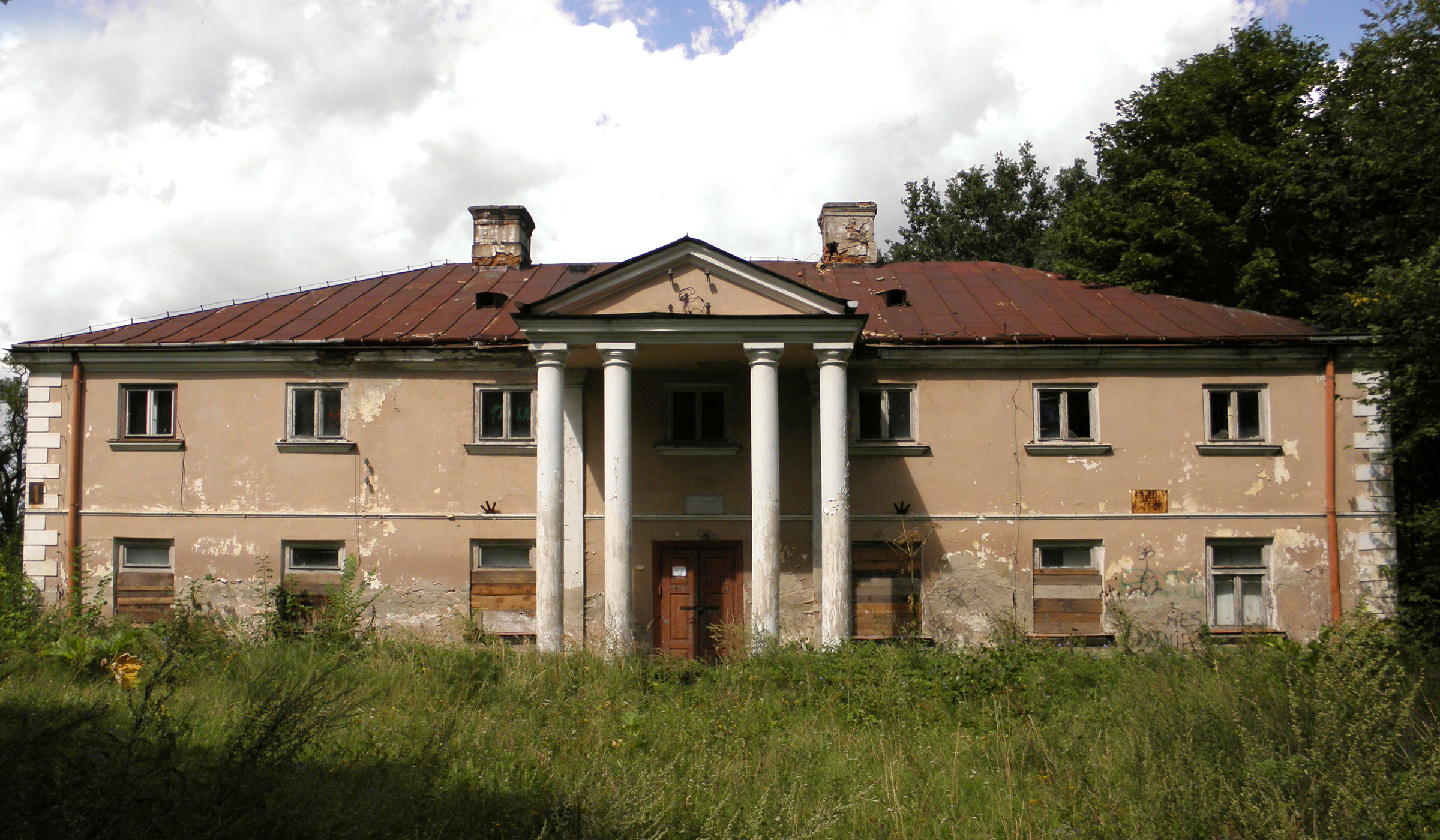

- Location within Poland
- Coordinates: 51°20′N 20°56′E
- Country: Poland
- Voivodeship: Masovian
- County: Szydłowiec
- Gmina: Orońsko
- Population (approx.): 580

Łaziska [waˈʑiska] is a village in the administrative district of Gmina Orońsko, within Szydłowiec County, Masovian Voivodeship, in east-central Poland.
