= Anna Jabłonowska =

Polish magnate and politician (1728–1800)

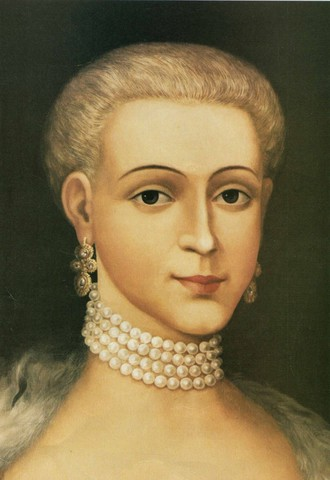
Anna z Sapiehów Jablonowska

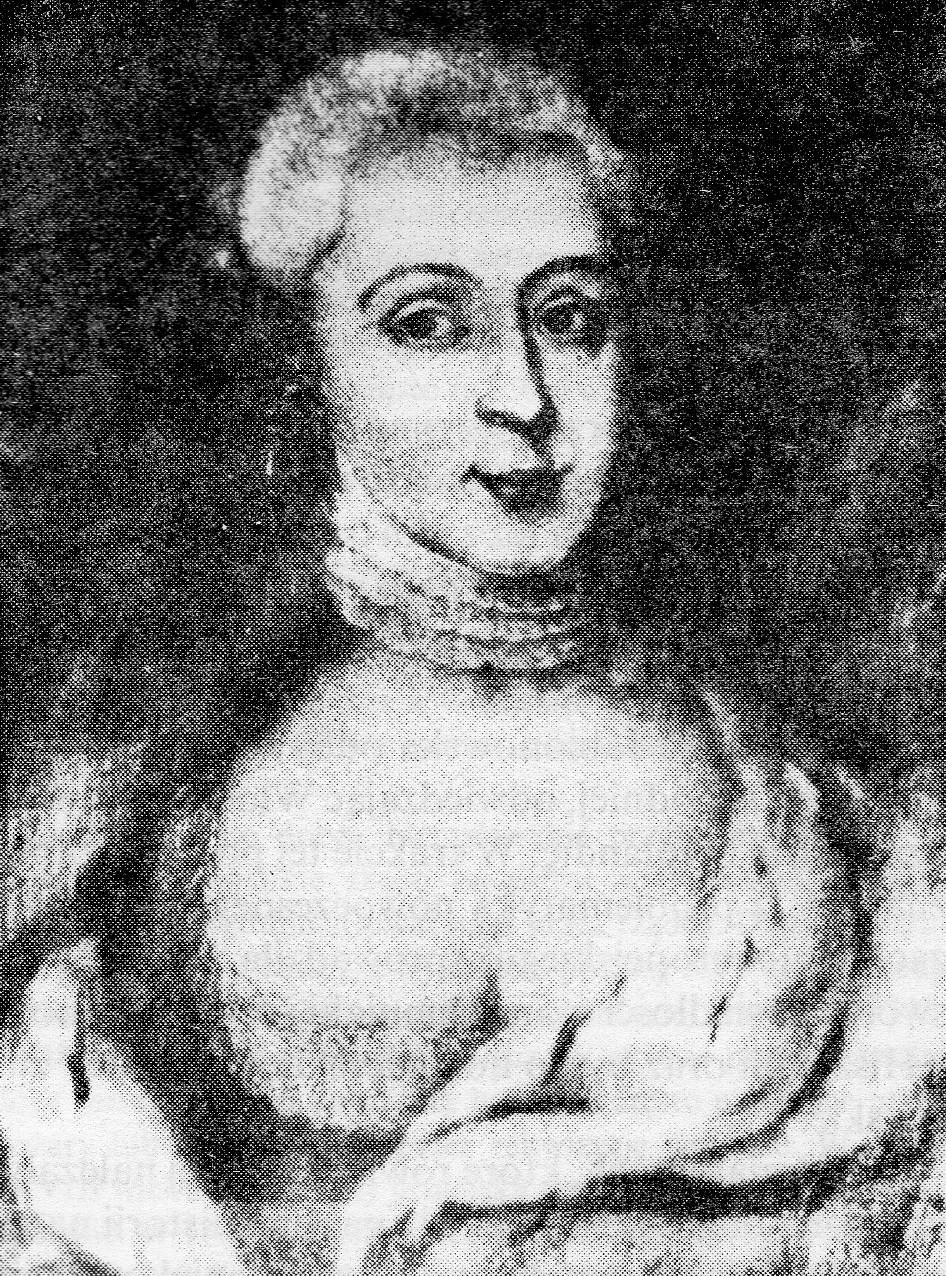
Anna Jablonowska

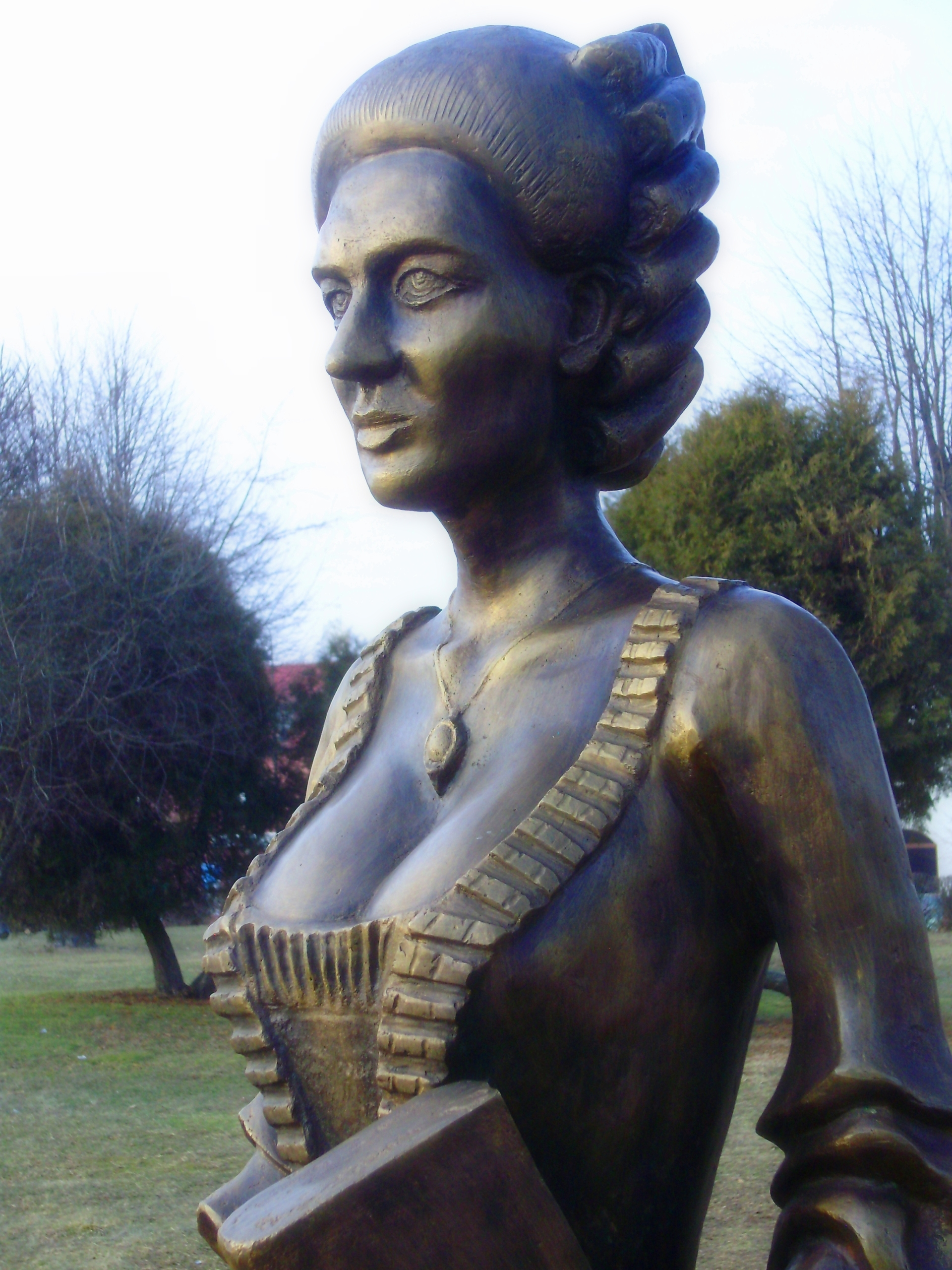
Anna Jabłonowska statue in Siemiatycze – closeup

Princess Anna Paulina Jabłonowska (née Sapieha; 22 June 1728, Wołpa — 7 February 1800) was a Polish magnate and politician. She was known for her remarkable activity on her estates, in which she introduced social inventions as well as industry. She was also known for her scientific interests, and possessed a naturalist collection famed in contemporary Europe. She has been referred to as one of the most significant women of 18th-century Poland.

== Life ==
Princess Anna Jabłonowska was the daughter of Prince Kazimierz Leon Sapieha (1697–1738) and his wife, Princess Karolina Teresa Radziwill (1707-1765). In 1750, she married Prince Jan Kajetan Jabłonowski (1699-1764), governor of Bracław.

=== Political activity ===
After having been widowed in 1764, Anna Jabłonowska actively engaged in Polish politics. She belonged to the opposition of king Stanisław August Poniatowski and supported the Bar Confederation (1768-1772) at the courts of Vienna and Paris, where she travelled in 1769 to act as an informal diplomat, returning to Poland in 1771. After the failure of the Bar Confederation, however, she acknowledged its defeat, reconciled with the king and retired from political life to concentrate on her domains.

=== Social action and entrepreneurship ===
Anna Jabłonowska devoted herself to managing her domains as a magnate. She followed a policy of social action to improve the life of the population in the cities and villages on her estates. She abolished Socage in favour of Quit-rent for the peasants and other tenants, built hospitals and founded textile and other factories. Because of her concern for efficient management in her vast domains, she developed a system of procedures to clarify the duties of officials employed in Siemiatycze, Kock and Wysocko.

She was particularly interested in developing the cities of Podlasie, Volhynia, Siemiatycze and Kock. In Siemiatycze, she founded a government building, a printing press, a Midwifery school and factories, making Siemiatycze a regional trading and industrial center. She also introduced a type of loan fund for peasants.

=== Scientific activity ===
In Kock, she rebuilt the existing palace to an impressive residence, which she made in to a center of science. Known for her interest in science, Anna Jabłonowska invited foreign scientists to Kock, which became famous in contemporary Europe for her library and naturalist collection, referred to as one of the best in Europe.

== Works ==
- Ustawy powszechne dla dóbr moich rządców, t. 1–7, Siemiatycze 1783–1785; wyd. następne: t. 1–8, Warszawa 1786 (2 wydania)
- Porządek robót miesięcznych ogrodnika na cały rok wypisany i na miesiące podzielony, Siemiatycze 1786; wyd. następne: wyd. 2 Warszawa 1787; wyd. 3, 1792
- Księga ekonomiczna na trzy części podzielona, rękopis: Ossolineum, sygn. 3705/III
- Physiologia albo krótko zebrane lekcje elementarne o naturze i własnościach duszy, Siemiatycze 1786; wyd. 2 ze zmienioną w części egzemplarzy kartą tytułową: Psychologia..., Warszawa 1786, (autorstwo przekładu przypisuje jej Estreicher)
- Do J. A. Jabłonowskiego z roku 1762, rękopis: Biblioteka Czartoryskich, sygn. 1136
- Korespondencja z J. A. Jabłonowskim z lat 1763–1764, rękopis: Biblioteka Czartoryskich, sygn. 1153
- Do Stanisława Augusta z lat 1764–1780, rękopis: Biblioteka Czartoryskich, sygn. 665
- Listy z okresu konfederacji barskiej w zbiorze A. Krasińskiego, rękopis: Biblioteka Czartoryskich, sygn. 948
- Do J. A. Jabłonowskiego z roku 1771, rękopis: Biblioteka Czartoryskich, sygn. 1156
- Do Stanisława Augusta 2 listy z lat: 1770, 1792; rękopis: Biblioteka Czartoryskich, sygn. 727
- Do J. A. Jabłonowskiego (przed rokiem 1777), rękopis: Biblioteka Czartoryskich, sygn. 845
- Do Stanisława Augusta 9 listów z lat: 1780–1784; rękopis: Biblioteka Czartoryskich, sygn. 666
- Do Stanisława Augusta 3 listy z lat: 1780–1786 oraz dokumenty urzędowe; rękopis: Biblioteka Czartoryskich, sygn. 697
- Do Stanisława Augusta 2 listy z lat: 1786–1787; rękopis: Biblioteka Czartoryskich, sygn. 699
- Do Stanisława Augusta 3 listy z lat: 1787–1792; rękopis: Biblioteka Czartoryskich, sygn. 732
- Do Stanisława Augusta z roku 1792, rękopis: Biblioteka Czartoryskich, sygn. 922
- Listy w zbiorze A. z Potockich Branickiej, rękopis: Archiwum Główne Akt Dawnych (Archiwum Wilanowskie)
- Korespondencja w zbiorach byłego Ossolineum Lwowskiego (Archiwum Sapiehów, teka 32)
- Ustawy dla mego rządcy, rękopis: Biblioteka Czartoryskich, sygn. 1508
- Akta i różne materiały, rękopisy: Ossolineum, sygn.: 5429/III, 5772/II
