= Wysoka, Masovian Voivodeship =

Wysoka
- Village
- Location within Poland
- Coordinates: 51°17′32″N 20°52′50″E
- Country: Poland
- Voivodeship: Masovian
- County: Szydłowiec
- Gmina: Szydłowiec
- Population: 171

Wysoka [vɨˈsɔka] is a village in the administrative district of Gmina Szydłowiec, within Szydłowiec County, Masovian Voivodeship, in east-central Poland.
