= Wola Lipieniecka Duża =

- Village
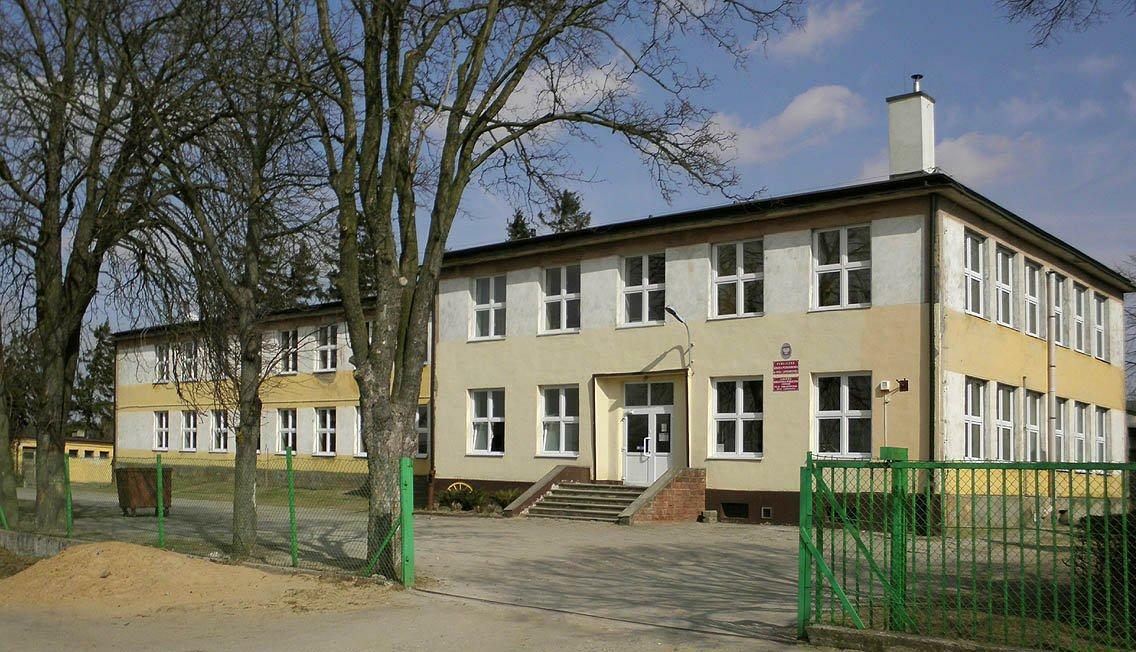

- Location within Poland
- Coordinates: 51°16′00″N 20°59′23″E
- Country: Poland
- Voivodeship: Masovian
- County: Szydłowiec
- Gmina: Jastrząb

Wola Lipieniecka Duża [ˈvɔla lipjɛˈɲɛt͡ska ˈduʐa] is a village in the administrative district of Gmina Jastrząb, within Szydłowiec County, Masovian Voivodeship, in east-central Poland.
