= Pawłów, Szydłowiec County =

Pawłów
- Village
- Location within Poland
- Coordinates: 51°16′N 20°50′E
- Country: Poland
- Voivodeship: Masovian
- County: Szydłowiec
- Gmina: Chlewiska
- Population: 780

Pawłów [ˈpavwuf] is a village in the administrative district of Gmina Chlewiska, within Szydłowiec County, Masovian Voivodeship, in east-central Poland.
