= Śmiłów, Masovian Voivodeship =

Śmiłów
- Village
- Location within Poland
- Coordinates: 51°14′N 20°55′E
- Country: Poland
- Voivodeship: Masovian
- County: Szydłowiec
- Gmina: Jastrząb
- Population: 133

Śmiłów [ˈɕmiwuf] is a village in the administrative district of Gmina Jastrząb, within Szydłowiec County, Masovian Voivodeship, in east-central Poland.
