= Chałupki Łaziskie =

- Village
- Location within Poland
- Coordinates: 51°20′28″N 20°53′17″E
- Country: Poland
- Voivodeship: Masovian
- County: Szydłowiec
- Gmina: Orońsko

Chałupki Łaziskie [xaˈwupki waˈʑiskʲɛ] is a village in the administrative district of Gmina Orońsko, within Szydłowiec County, Masovian Voivodeship, in east-central Poland.
