= Guzów-Kolonia =

- Village
- Location within Poland
- Coordinates: 51°20′43″N 20°58′22″E
- Country: Poland
- Voivodeship: Masovian
- County: Szydłowiec
- Gmina: Orońsko

Guzów-Kolonia [ˈɡuzuf kɔˈlɔɲa] is a village in the administrative district of Gmina Orońsko, within Szydłowiec County, Masovian Voivodeship, in east-central Poland.
