= Antoniów, Szydłowiec County =

Antoniów
- Village
- Location within Poland
- Coordinates: 51°12′11″N 20°41′47″E
- Country: Poland
- Voivodeship: Masovian
- County: Szydłowiec
- Gmina: Chlewiska
- Population: 55

Antoniów [anˈtɔɲuf] is a village in the administrative district of Gmina Chlewiska, within Szydłowiec County, Masovian Voivodeship, in east-central Poland.
