= Bieszków Górny =

- Village
- Location within Poland
- Coordinates: 51°12′39″N 20°58′57″E
- Country: Poland
- Voivodeship: Masovian
- County: Szydłowiec
- Gmina: Mirów

Bieszków Górny [ˈbjɛʂkuf ˈɡurnɨ] is a village in the administrative district of Gmina Mirów, within Szydłowiec County, Masovian Voivodeship, in east-central Poland.
