= Borki, Szydłowiec County =

Borki
- Village
- Location within Poland
- Coordinates: 51°11′04″N 20°43′10″E
- Country: Poland
- Voivodeship: Masovian
- County: Szydłowiec
- Gmina: Chlewiska
- Population: 77

Borki [ˈbɔrki] is a village in the administrative district of Gmina Chlewiska, within Szydłowiec County, Masovian Voivodeship, in east-central Poland.
