= Nowy Dwór, Masovian Voivodeship =

Nowy Dwór
- Village
- Location within Poland
- Coordinates: 51°14′17″N 21°00′39″E
- Country: Poland
- Voivodeship: Masovian
- County: Szydłowiec
- Gmina: Jastrząb

Nowy Dwór [ˈnɔvɨ ˈdvur] is a village in the administrative district of Gmina Jastrząb, within Szydłowiec County, Masovian Voivodeship, in east-central Poland.
