= Cukrówka, Masovian Voivodeship =

Cukrówka
- Village
- Location within Poland
- Coordinates: 51°17′N 20°48′E
- Country: Poland
- Voivodeship: Masovian
- County: Szydłowiec
- Gmina: Chlewiska
- Population: 265

Cukrówka [t͡suˈkrufka] is a village in the administrative district of Gmina Chlewiska, within Szydłowiec County, Masovian Voivodeship, in east-central Poland.
