= Mirówek =

- Village
- Location within Poland
- Coordinates: 51°14′N 21°2′E
- Country: Poland
- Voivodeship: Masovian
- County: Szydłowiec
- Gmina: Mirów

Mirówek [miˈruvɛk] is a village in the administrative district of Gmina Mirów, within Szydłowiec County, Masovian Voivodeship, in east-central Poland.
