= Majdów =

- Village
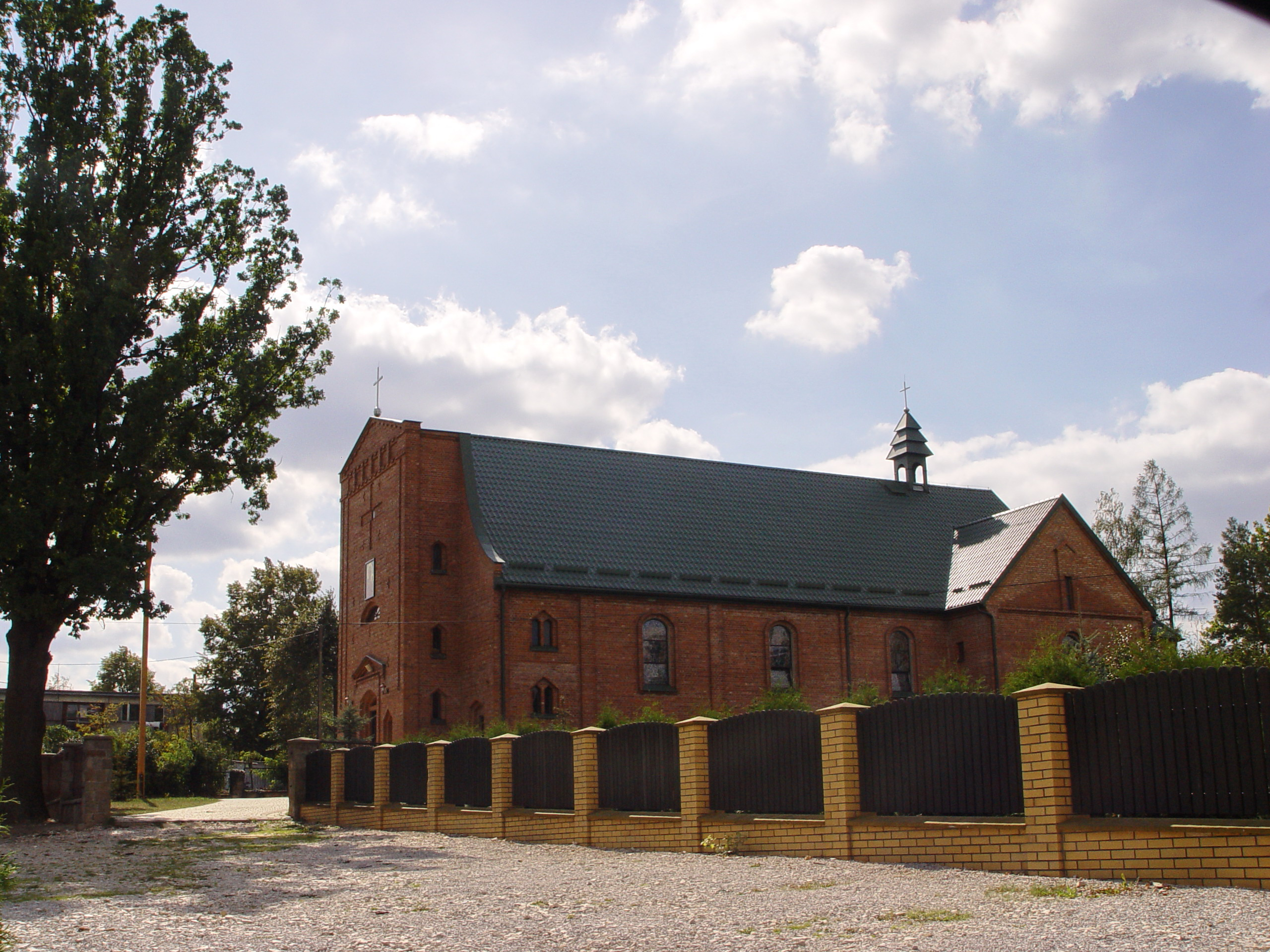
- Exaltation of the Holy Cross church in Majdów

- Location within Poland
- Coordinates: 51°10′N 20°47′E
- Country: Poland
- Voivodeship: Masovian
- County: Szydłowiec
- Gmina: Szydłowiec

Population
  - Total: 609
- Time zone: UTC+1 (CET)
  - Summer (DST): UTC+2 (CEST)

Majdów [ˈmai̯duf] is a village in the administrative district of Gmina Szydłowiec, within Szydłowiec County, Masovian Voivodeship, in east-central Poland.

Eight Polish citizens were murdered by Nazi Germany in the village during World War II.
