= Battle of Guzów =

1607 battle in Poland-Lithuania

Coordinates: 51°20′5″N 20°58′5″E

- Part of The Zebrzydowski Rebellion
Date	5 July 1607
Location	Guzów, Polish–Lithuanian Commonwealth
Result	Royalist Victory

Belligerents
Forces of the Zebrzydowski Rebellion	Polish Royalists

Commanders and leaders
Mikołaj Zebrzydowski and Janusz Radziwiłł	Polish Grand Crown Hetman Stanisław Żółkiewski and Lithuanian Hetman Jan Karol Chodkiewicz

Strength
10,000 infantry and 600 cavalry	9,100 infantry, 3,200 cavalry, and 24 cannon

Casualties and losses
200 total between the two armies	200 total between the two armies

The Battle of Guzów (Polish: Bitwa pod Guzowem) took place on 5 July 1607, at the village of Guzów in Szydłowiec County, Polish–Lithuanian Commonwealth. The confrontation was between the forces of the Zebrzydowski Rebellion (10,000 infantry and 600 cavalry under Mikołaj Zebrzydowski and Janusz Radziwiłł) against the Royalists supporting King Sigismund III Vasa (9,100 infantry, 3,200 cavalry, and 24 cannon), under the command of Polish Grand Crown Hetman (commander-in-chief) Stanisław Żółkiewski and the Lithuanian Hetman Jan Karol Chodkiewicz.

== Conflict ==
The "Zebrzydowski rebellion" was waged by a large number of Polish-Lithuanian nobles (szlachta) who had many grievances against the Swedish-born King, who concerned himself with regaining the throne of Sweden. The Royal Army was originally sent to pacify the rebels. However, a full-scale battle ensued in the village, with 200 casualties, and it ended with the Royalists routing the rebellious factions.

The insurgents were commanded in the centre by Zebrzydowski, and at the wings by Radziwił and Herburt; whilst the royal forces were commanded in the centre by the brothers Potocki, and the wings by Żółkiewski and Chodkiewicz. Notwithstanding the superiority of the royal army in respect to numbers, discipline, and the experience of the men and the skill of the leaders, the beginning of the battle was favourable to the insurgents. Radziwił broke, by a successful attack, the wing commanded by Chodkiewicz, and some of his troops penetrated to within a short distance of the royal tent. The king, notwithstanding the advice which was given to him to fly to the other wing, remained in his position, and his firmness contributed much to the gaining of the battle, which the insurgents lost chiefly through the cowardice or treachery of one of their officers, called Laszcz, who, instead of supporting Herburt, himself gave the signal for flight. The insurgents were dispersed, and two of the principal leaders, Herburt and Penkosławski, taken prisoners and condemned to death, but the sentence was not executed. The insurgents, although defeated, were by no means annihilated…

During the next twelve months new "insurrections" burst forth all over the country; and peace was only restored by the proclamation (1609) of a general amnesty, which punished nobody and decided nothing. The growing unwillingness of the Grand Hetman Żółkiewski "to shed the blood of our brethren" was the cause of this unsatisfactory solution. The helpless King was obliged to concur, and henceforth abandoned all his projects of constitutional reform.

== 2007 mention ==
A Polish politician resurrected this battle after 400 years. In a newspaper interview on March 16, 2007 with Rzeczpospolita, the opposition leader Jan Rokita, who was expected to win the September 25, 2005 Polish elections, said:

There has to be a Battle of Guzów and the nobles rising against the crown will be overcome. Those who are most sprightly in the approach to the insurrection, will reject of a statement of defeat for definitely a long time. However, some will gain some intelligence in their heads and pacification will come.

In other words, the Battle of Guzów has to be repeated with the current government of President Lech Kaczyński defeating the opposition. The government will not accept that their position is wrong. However, in the long run, some of them will wise up and concede when none of their conservative plans are implemented.

== Notes ==
As with many historical battles, the exact details of force composition, tactics, and the actual course of the battle are lacking and sometimes contradictory.

The area around the village of Guzów also saw action during World War I. See:

- Washburn, Stanley. "from the book 'Field Notes from the Russian Front' Front' - "A Night Attack in a Snow-Storm" - January 6, 1915". Archived from the original on 7 February 2012.
- "Primary Documents: British Military Observer's Account of the German Attack on Warsaw, 1914". firstworldwar.com.
- "from 'the War Budget' - "Ivan Ivanovitch the Truth about the Russian Soldier," May 1, 1915". Archived from the original on 13 February 2012.
