= Huta, Szydłowiec County =

Huta
- Village
- Location within Poland
- Coordinates: 51°13′N 20°44′E
- Country: Poland
- Voivodeship: Masovian
- County: Szydłowiec
- Gmina: Chlewiska
- Population: 185

Huta [ˈxuta] is a village in the administrative district of Gmina Chlewiska, within Szydłowiec County, Masovian Voivodeship, in east-central Poland.
