= Świerczek, Masovian Voivodeship =

Świerczek
- Village
- Location within Poland
- Coordinates: 51°14′N 20°52′E
- Country: Poland
- Voivodeship: Masovian
- County: Szydłowiec
- Gmina: Szydłowiec
- Population: 328

Świerczek (Polish pronunciation: [ˈɕfjɛrt͡ʂɛk]) is a village in the administrative district of Gmina Szydłowiec, within Szydłowiec County, Masovian Voivodeship, in east-central Poland.
