= Lipienice =

Lipienice may refer to the following places in Poland:

- Lipienice, Masovian Voivodeship
- Lipienice, Pomeranian Voivodeship
