= Śniadków =

- Village
- Location within Poland
- Coordinates: 51°17′9″N 21°0′20″E
- Country: Poland
- Voivodeship: Masovian
- County: Szydłowiec
- Gmina: Orońsko

Śniadków [ˈɕɲatkuf] is a village in the administrative district of Gmina Orońsko, within Szydłowiec County, Masovian Voivodeship, in east-central Poland.
