= Rybianka =

- Village
- Location within Poland
- Coordinates: 51°15′N 20°50′E
- Country: Poland
- Voivodeship: Masovian
- County: Szydłowiec
- Gmina: Szydłowiec
- Population: 109

Rybianka [rɨˈbjaŋka] is a village in the administrative district of Gmina Szydłowiec, within Szydłowiec County, Masovian Voivodeship, in east-central Poland.
