= Ostałówek =

- Village
- Location within Poland
- Coordinates: 51°18′N 20°49′E
- Country: Poland
- Voivodeship: Masovian
- County: Szydłowiec
- Gmina: Chlewiska
- Population: 336

Ostałówek [ɔstaˈwuvɛk] is a village in the administrative district of Gmina Chlewiska, within Szydłowiec County, Masovian Voivodeship, in east-central Poland.
