= Tomaszów, Szydłowiec County =

Tomaszów
- Village
- Location within Poland
- Coordinates: 51°17′27″N 21°01′58″E
- Country: Poland
- Voivodeship: Masovian
- County: Szydłowiec
- Gmina: Orońsko

Tomaszów [tɔˈmaʂuf] is a village in the administrative district of Gmina Orońsko, within Szydłowiec County, Masovian Voivodeship, in east-central Poland.
