= Gmina Jastrząb =

Gmina Jastrząb Jastrząb Commune
- Gmina
- Coat of arms
- Interactive map of Gmina Jastrząb
- Coordinates (Jastrząb): 51°15′N 20°57′E
- Country: Poland
- Voivodeship: Masovian
- County: Szydłowiec
- Seat: Jastrząb

Area
  - Total: 54.79 km^{2} (21.15 sq mi)

Population (2006)
  - Total: 5,089
  - Density: 92.88/km^{2} (240.6/sq mi)
- Website: http://www.jastrzab.gmina.waw.pl

Gmina Jastrząb is an urban-rural gmina (administrative district) in Szydłowiec County, Masovian Voivodeship, in east-central Poland. Its seat is the town of Jastrząb, which lies approximately 8 kilometres (5 mi) east of Szydłowiec and 108 km (67 mi) south of Warsaw.

The gmina covers an area of 54.79 square kilometres (21.2 sq mi), and as of 2006 its total population is 5,089.

== Villages ==
Gmina Jastrząb contains the villages and settlements of Gąsawy Plebańskie, Gąsawy Rządowe, Gąsawy Rządowe-Niwy, Jastrząb, Kolonia Kuźnia, Kuźnia, Lipienice, Nowy Dwór, Orłów, Śmiłów, Wola Lipieniecka Duża and Wola Lipieniecka Mała.

== Neighbouring gminas ==
Gmina Jastrząb is bordered by the gminas of Mirów, Orońsko, Szydłowiec, Wierzbica and Wolanów.
