= Długosz =

Długosz is a Polish surname. Notable people with the surname include:

- Jan Długosz (1415–1480), Polish bishop and chronicler
- Jan Długosz (1929–1962), Polish mountaineer
- Leszek Długosz (born 1941), Polish actor
- Louis F. Dlugosz (1915–2002), American sculptor
- Ryszard Długosz (born 1941), Polish wrestler
- Wiktor Długosz, Polish footballer

== See also ==
- Długosz, Masovian Voivodeship, village in Poland
