= Krogulcza Sucha =

- Village
- Location within Poland
- Coordinates: 51°19′N 21°0′E
- Country: Poland
- Voivodeship: Masovian
- County: Szydłowiec
- Gmina: Orońsko

Krogulcza Sucha [krɔˈɡult͡ʂa ˈsuxa] is a village in the administrative district of Gmina Orońsko, within Szydłowiec County, Masovian Voivodeship, in east-central Poland.
