= Gmina Chlewiska =

Gmina Chlewiska Chlewiska Commune
- Gmina
- Flag Coat of arms
- Interactive map of Gmina Chlewiska
- Coordinates (Chlewiska): 51°14′37″N 20°45′39″E
- Country: Poland
- Voivodeship: Masovian
- County: Szydłowiec
- Seat: Chlewiska

Area
  - Total: 124.2 km^{2} (48.0 sq mi)

Population (2006)
  - Total: 6,196
  - Density: 49.89/km^{2} (129.2/sq mi)
- Website: https://www.chlewiska.pl

Gmina Chlewiska is a rural gmina (administrative district) in Szydłowiec County, Masovian Voivodeship, in east-central Poland. Its seat is the village of Chlewiska, which lies approximately 7 kilometres (4 mi) west of Szydłowiec and 110 km (68 mi) south of Warsaw. The gmina covers an area of 124.2 square kilometres (48.0 sq mi), and as of 2006 its total population is 6,196.

== Villages ==
Gmina Chlewiska contains the villages and settlements of Aleksandrów, Antoniów, Borki, Broniów, Budki, Chlewiska, Cukrówka, Huta, Koszorów, Krawara, Leszczyny, Majdanki, Nadolna, Ostałów, Ostałówek, Pawłów, Skłoby, Stanisławów, Stefanków, Sulistrowice, Wola Zagrodnia, Zaława and Zawonia.

== Neighbouring gminas ==
Gmina Chlewiska is bordered by the gminas of Bliżyn, Borkowice, Przysucha, Stąporków, Szydłowiec and Wieniawa.
