= Mirów, Szydłowiec County =

Mirów
- Village
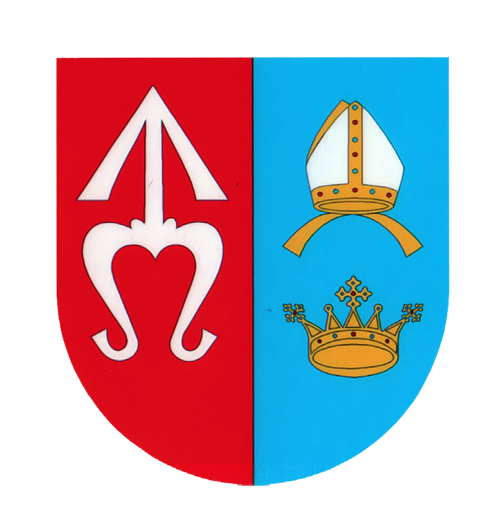
- Coat of arms

- Location within Poland
- Coordinates: 51°11′31″N 21°01′42″E
- Country: Poland
- Voivodeship: Masovian
- County: Szydłowiec
- Gmina: Mirów

Mirów [ˈmiruf] is a village in Szydłowiec County, Masovian Voivodeship, in east-central Poland. It is the seat of the gmina (administrative district) called Gmina Mirów.
