= Chronów-Kolonia Górna =

Village in Gmina Orońsko, Poland

- Village
- Location within Poland
- Coordinates: 51°20′25″N 20°56′55″E
- Country: Poland
- Voivodeship: Masovian
- County: Szydłowiec
- Gmina: Orońsko

Chronów-Kolonia Górna [ˈxrɔnuf kɔˈlɔɲa ˈɡurna] is a village in the administrative district of Gmina Orońsko, within Szydłowiec County, Masovian Voivodeship, in east-central Poland.
