= Wysocko, Masovian Voivodeship =

Wysocko
- Village
- Location within Poland
- Coordinates: 51°17′N 20°52′E
- Country: Poland
- Voivodeship: Masovian
- County: Szydłowiec
- Gmina: Szydłowiec
- Population: 173

Wysocko [vɨˈsɔt͡skɔ] is a village in the administrative district of Gmina Szydłowiec, within Szydłowiec County, Masovian Voivodeship, in east-central Poland.
