= Gmina Orońsko =

Gmina Orońsko Orońsko Commune
- Gmina
- Flag Coat of arms
- Interactive map of Gmina Orońsko
- Coordinates (Orońsko): 51°19′N 20°59′E
- Country: Poland
- Voivodeship: Masovian
- County: Szydłowiec
- Seat: Orońsko

Area
  - Total: 81.91 km^{2} (31.63 sq mi)

Population (2006)
  - Total: 5,706
  - Density: 69.66/km^{2} (180.4/sq mi)
- Website: http://www.oronsko.pl

Gmina Orońsko is a rural gmina (administrative district) in Szydłowiec County, Masovian Voivodeship, in east-central Poland. Its seat is the village of Orońsko, which lies approximately 14 kilometres (9 mi) north-east of Szydłowiec and 100 km (62 mi) south of Warsaw.

The gmina covers an area of 81.91 square kilometres (31.6 sq mi), and as of 2006 its total population is 5,706.

== Villages ==
Gmina Orońsko contains the villages and settlements of Bąków, Chałupki Łaziskie, Chronów, Chronów-Kolonia Dolna, Chronów-Kolonia Górna, Chronówek, Ciepła, Dobrut, Gozdków, Guzów, Guzów-Kolonia, Helenów, Krogulcza Mokra, Krogulcza Sucha, Łaziska, Orońsko, Śniadków, Tomaszów, Wałsnów and Zaborowie.

== Neighbouring gminas ==
Gmina Orońsko is bordered by the gminas of Jastrząb, Kowala, Szydłowiec, Wieniawa, Wierzbica and Wolanów.
