= Chronów, Masovian Voivodeship =

Chronów
- Village
- Location within Poland
- Coordinates: 51°21′22″N 20°55′57″E
- Country: Poland
- Voivodeship: Masovian
- County: Szydłowiec
- Gmina: Orońsko

Chronów [ˈxrɔnuf] is a village in the administrative district of Gmina Orońsko, within Szydłowiec County, Masovian Voivodeship, in east-central Poland.
