= Krogulcza Mokra =

- Village
- Location within Poland
- Coordinates: 51°20′01″N 21°00′09″E
- Country: Poland
- Voivodeship: Masovian
- County: Szydłowiec
- Gmina: Orońsko

Krogulcza Mokra [krɔˈɡult͡ʂa ˈmɔkra] is a village in the administrative district of Gmina Orońsko, within Szydłowiec County, Masovian Voivodeship, in east-central Poland.
