= Kuźnia, Masovian Voivodeship =

Kuźnia
- Village
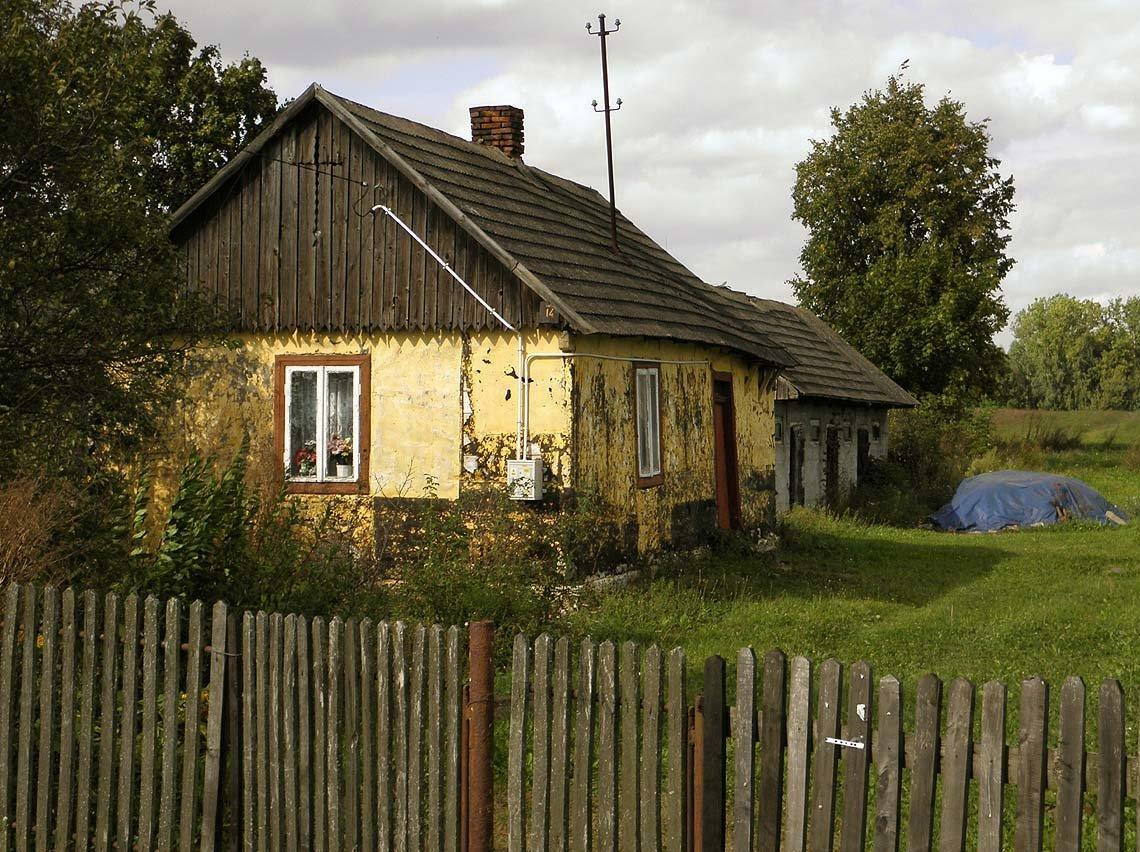
- Roadside house in Kuźnia

- Location within Poland
- Coordinates: 51°16′11″N 20°58′31″E
- Country: Poland
- Voivodeship: Masovian
- County: Szydłowiec
- Gmina: Jastrząb

Kuźnia [ˈkuʑɲa] is a village in the administrative district of Gmina Jastrząb, within Szydłowiec County, Masovian Voivodeship, in east-central Poland.
