= Lipienice, Masovian Voivodeship =

Lipienice
- Village
- Location within Poland
- Coordinates: 51°14′51″N 20°57′49″E
- Country: Poland
- Voivodeship: Masovian
- County: Szydłowiec
- Gmina: Jastrząb

Lipienice [lipjɛˈnit͡sɛ] is a village in the administrative district of Gmina Jastrząb, within Szydłowiec County, Masovian Voivodeship, in east-central Poland.
