= Chlewiska, Szydłowiec County =

Chlewiska
- Village
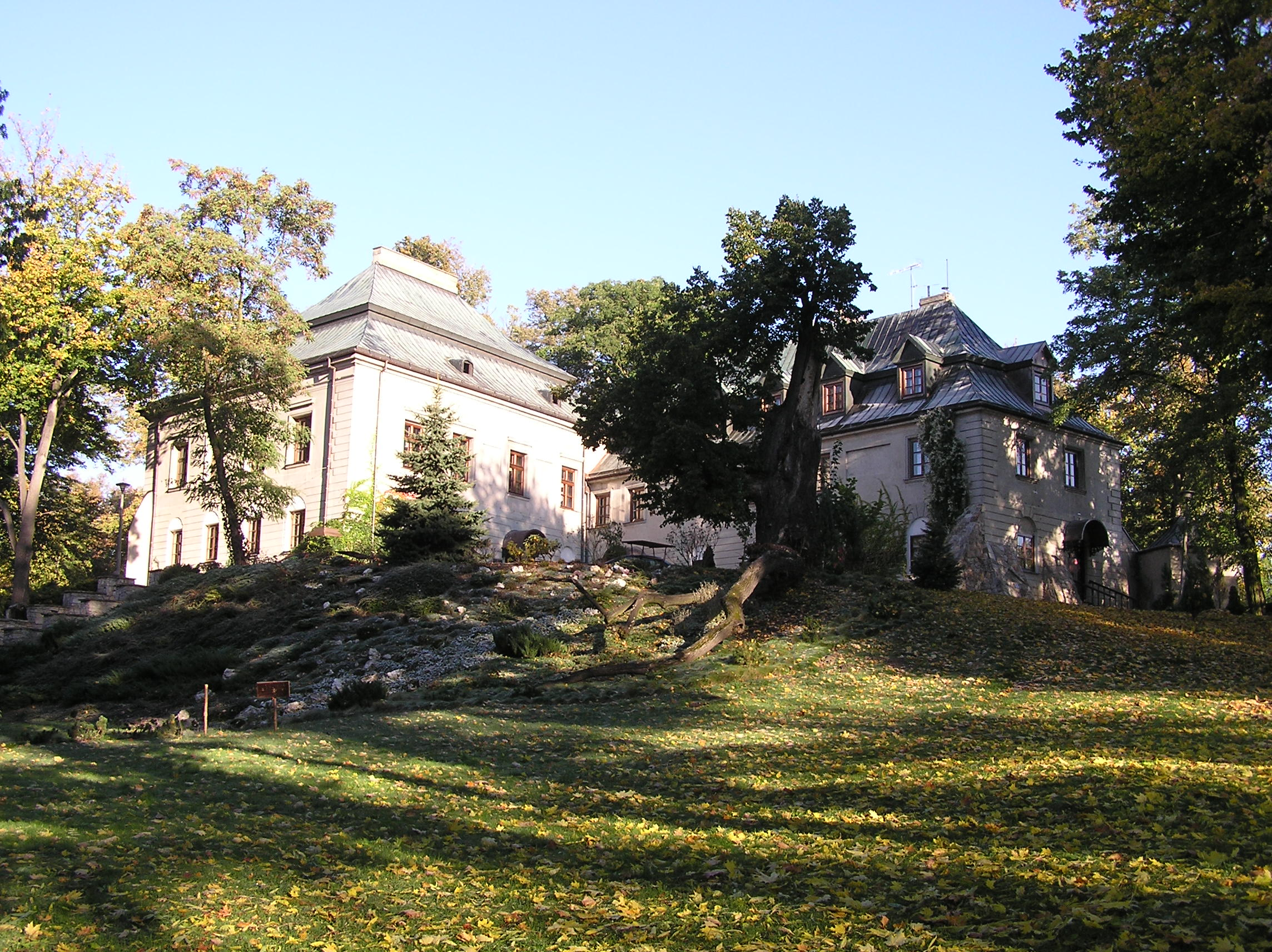
- Manor house of the Odrowąż noble family

- Flag Coat of arms

- Location within Poland
- Coordinates: 51°14′37″N 20°45′39″E
- Country: Poland
- Voivodeship: Masovian
- County: Szydłowiec
- Gmina: Chlewiska
- Elevation: 211 m (692 ft)
- Population: 1,089

Chlewiska [xlɛˈviska] is a village in Szydłowiec County, Masovian Voivodeship, in east-central Poland. It is the seat of the gmina (administrative district) called Gmina Chlewiska.
