= Jastrząb, Szydłowiec County =

Jastrząb
- Town
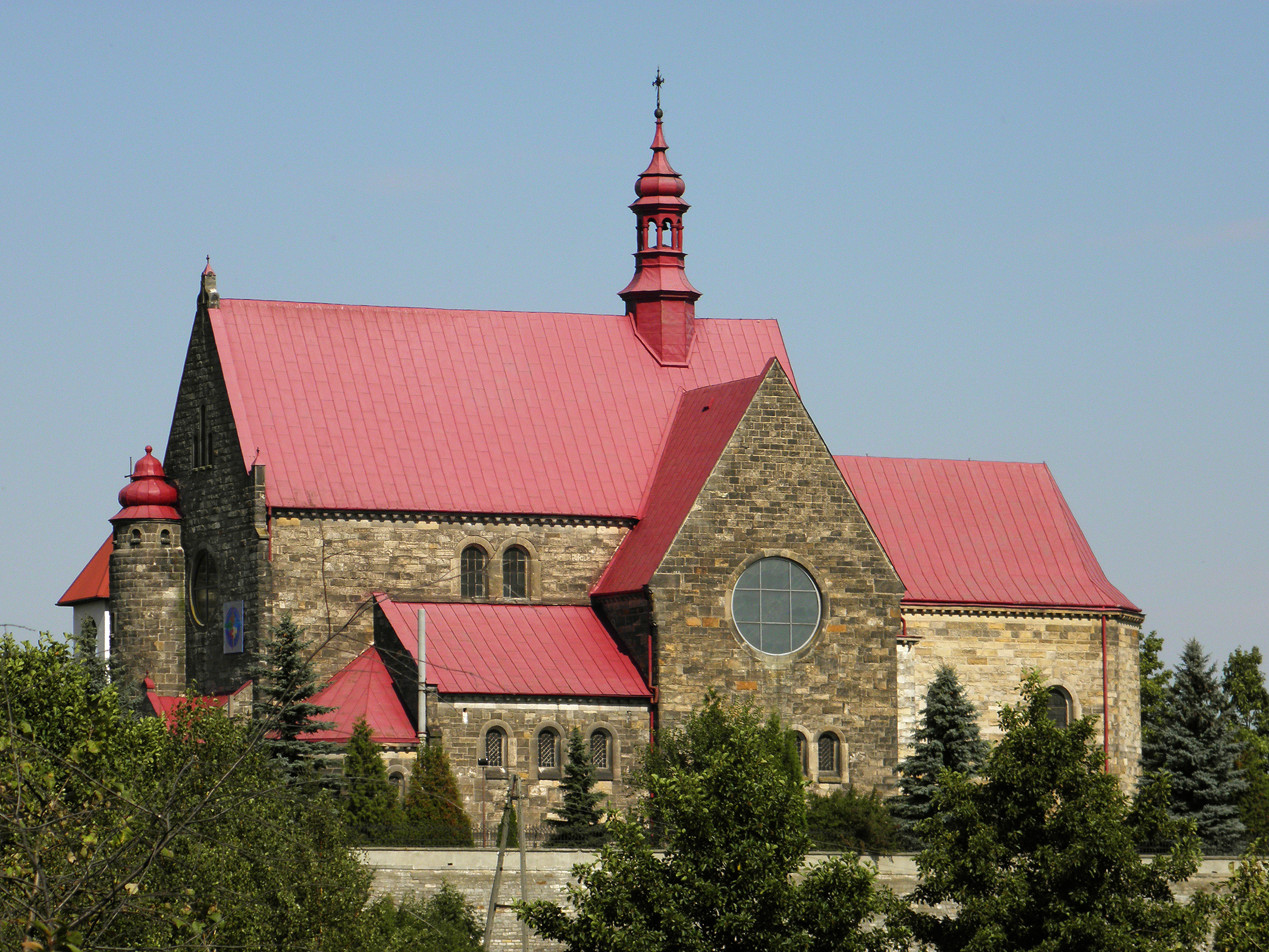
- Saint John the Baptist church in Jastrząb

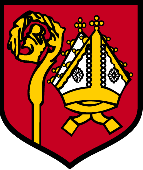
- Coat of arms

- Location within Poland
- Coordinates: 51°15′N 20°57′E
- Country: Poland
- Voivodeship: Masovian
- County: Szydłowiec
- Gmina: Jastrząb
- Time zone: UTC+1 (CET)
  - Summer (DST): UTC+2 (CEST)
- Vehicle registration: WSZ

Jastrząb [ˈjastʂɔmp] is a town in Szydłowiec County, Masovian Voivodeship, in east-central Poland. It is the seat of the gmina (administrative district) called Gmina Jastrząb. Jastrzab belongs to Lesser Poland.

== History ==
The name of the town comes from Bishop of Kraków Wojciech Jastrzębiec. According to Jan Długosz, Jastrząb was founded by Bishop Jastrzębiec in 1422. The village was located on a merchant route from Iłża to Skrzynno, and was granted Magdeburg rights on September 30, 1427, by Cardinal Zbigniew Oleśnicki. Since its foundation, Jastrząb was administratively located in the Radom County in the Sandomierz Voivodeship in the Lesser Poland Province of the Kingdom of Poland.

Jastrząb has a parish church of John the Baptist. First church was erected here in the early 15th century. Burned in 1667, it was remodelled several times, and took its current shape in the early 20th century. There also was a castle, built in 1426 by Bishop Jastrzębiec. The castle was destroyed in the Swedish invasion of Poland, and has never been rebuilt.

Until 1789, Jastrząb remained private property of Bishops of Kraków, as part of their Iłża Estate (Klucz iłżecki). The town was a center of early industry, with iron ore and limestone deposits. In 1795, during the Third Partition of Poland it was seized by the Habsburg Empire. It was regained by Poles following the Austro-Polish War of 1809, and included within the short-lived Duchy of Warsaw. After the duchy's dissolution, it belonged to Russian-controlled Congress Poland. In 1820, the population of Jastrząb was app. 550, with 128 Jews. The town had 80 wooden and 21 brick houses. After the unsuccessful Polish January Uprising, Jastrząb was reduced to the status of a village (1869). In 1885, it received rail connection, on a line from Radom to Dąbrowa Górnicza. In the Second Polish Republic, and in 1945–1975, Jastrząb belonged to Kielce Voivodeship. Since 1973, Jastrząb has been the seat of a gmina.

== Transport ==
The Voivodeship road 727 runs through Jastrząb, and the S7 highway runs nearby, northwest of the town.

== Sports ==
The town has a sports club, KS Jastrząb.
