= Gmina Mirów =

Gmina Mirów Mirów Commune
- Gmina
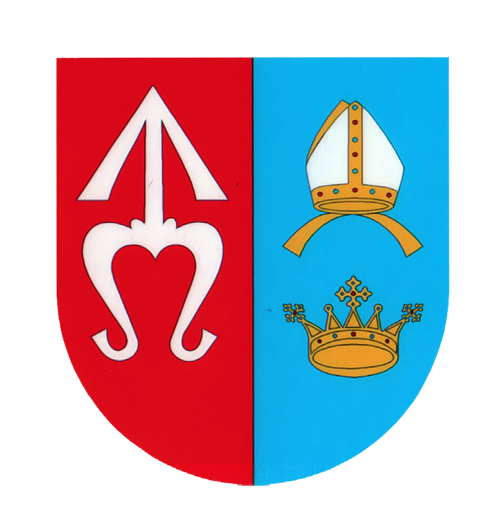
- Coat of arms
- Interactive map of Gmina Mirów
- Coordinates (Mirów): 51°12′N 21°2′E
- Country: Poland
- Voivodeship: Masovian
- County: Szydłowiec
- Seat: Mirów

Area
  - Total: 53.05 km^{2} (20.48 sq mi)

Population (2006)
  - Total: 3,802
  - Density: 71.67/km^{2} (185.6/sq mi)
- Website: http://www.mirow.pl

Gmina Mirów is a rural gmina (administrative district) in Szydłowiec County, Masovian Voivodeship, in east-central Poland. Its seat is the village of Mirów, which lies approximately 13 kilometres (8 mi) south-east of Szydłowiec and 115 km (71 mi) south of Warsaw.

The gmina covers an area of 53.05 square kilometres (20.5 sq mi), and as of 2006 its total population is 3,802.

== Villages ==
Gmina Mirów contains the villages and settlements of Bieszków Dolny, Bieszków Górny, Mirów, Mirów Nowy, Mirów Stary, Mirówek, Rogów, Zbijów Duży and Zbijów Mały.

== Neighbouring gminas ==
Gmina Mirów is bordered by the gminas of Jastrząb, Mirzec, Skarżysko Kościelne, Szydłowiec and Wierzbica.
