= Chronów-Kolonia Dolna =

Village in Gmina Orońsko, Poland

- Village
- Location within Poland
- Coordinates: 51°20′53″N 20°56′01″E
- Country: Poland
- Voivodeship: Masovian
- County: Szydłowiec
- Gmina: Orońsko

Chronów-Kolonia Dolna [ˈxrɔnuf kɔˈlɔɲa ˈdɔlna] is a village in the administrative district of Gmina Orońsko, within Szydłowiec County, Masovian Voivodeship, in east-central Poland.
