= Zawonia, Masovian Voivodeship =

Zawonia
- Village
- Location within Poland
- Coordinates: 51°18′34″N 20°47′28″E
- Country: Poland
- Voivodeship: Masovian
- County: Szydłowiec
- Gmina: Chlewiska
- Population: 109

Zawonia [zaˈvɔɲa] is a village in the administrative district of Gmina Chlewiska, within Szydłowiec County, Masovian Voivodeship, in east-central Poland.
