= Gmina Szydłowiec =

Gmina Szydłowiec Szydłowiec Commune
- Gmina
- Coat of arms

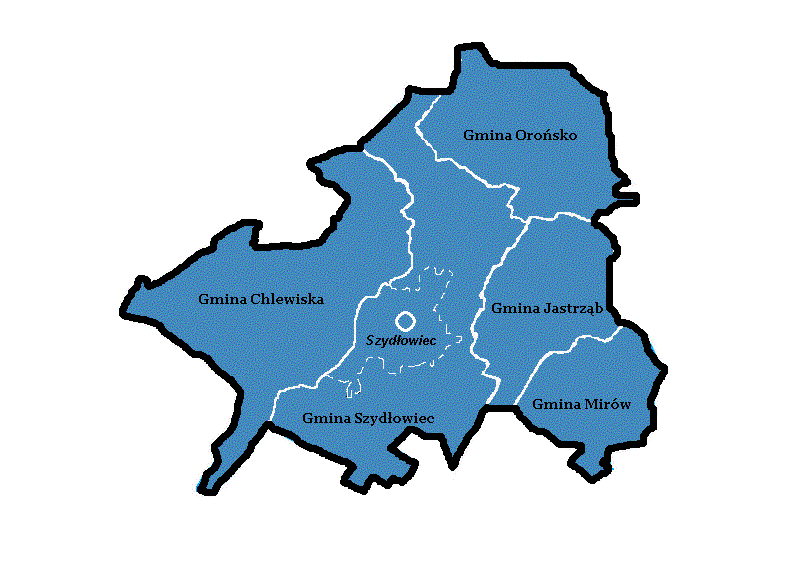
- Coordinates (Szydłowiec): 51°14′N 20°51′E
- Country: Poland
- Voivodeship: Masovian
- County: Szydłowiec
- Seat: Szydłowiec

Area
  - Total: 138.15 km^{2} (53.34 sq mi)

Population (2006)
  - Total: 19,290
  - Density: 139.6/km^{2} (361.6/sq mi)
  - Urban: 12,030
  - Rural: 7,260
- Website: https://www.szydlowiec.pl

Gmina Szydłowiec is an urban-rural gmina (administrative district) in Szydłowiec County, Masovian Voivodeship, in east-central Poland. Its seat is the town of Szydłowiec, which lies approximately 110 kilometres (68 mi) south of Warsaw.

The gmina covers an area of 138.15 square kilometres (53.3 sq mi), and as of 2006 its total population is 19,290 (out of which the population of Szydłowiec amounts to 12,030, and the population of the rural part of the gmina is 7,260).

== Villages ==
Apart from the town of Szydłowiec, Gmina Szydłowiec contains the villages and settlements of Barak, Chustki, Ciechostowice, Długosz, Hucisko, Jankowice, Korzyce, Krzcięcin, Łazy, Majdów, Marywil, Mszadla, Omięcin, Rybianka, Sadek, Świerczek, Świniów, Szydłówek, Wilcza Wola, Wola Korzeniowa, Wysocko, Wysoka, Zastronie and Zdziechów.

== Neighbouring gminas ==
Gmina Szydłowiec is bordered by the town of Skarżysko-Kamienna and by the gminas of Bliżyn, Chlewiska, Jastrząb, Mirów, Orońsko, Skarżysko Kościelne and Wieniawa.
