= Mikołaj Rudnicki =

Polish linguist (1881–1978)

Mikołaj Rudnicki (born 6 December 1881 in Sokołów Podlaski - died 28 June 1978 in Puszczykowo) was a Polish linguist. He finished his studies in Kraków. In 1911 he became a docent in Indoeuropean linguistics.

In 1919 he became a professor at Uniwersytet Poznański. From 1945 he was a member of the Polish Academy of Learning.

He published many works on psycho-phonetic issues:

- Studia psychofonetyczne
- Przyczynki do gramatyki i słownika narzecza słowiańskiego (1913)
- Wykształcenie językowe w życiu i w szkole (1920)
- Z dziejów polskiej myśli językowej i wychowania (1921)
- Prawo identyfikacji wyobrażeń niedostatecznie różnych (1927)
- Językoznawstwo polskie w dobie Oświecenia (1956)
- Prasłowiańszczyzna
- Lechia Polska (1959–1961)

He also published many literature works and dramas using the pen names: M.S. Rozwar and E. Meser.

Mikołaj Rudnicki proved that the ancestry of name Schivelbein comes from Skwielbin or Skwilbin, which means disc on swamp.

== Sources ==
Wielka Encyklopedia Powszechna PWN (1962–1969)

Koerner, E. F. K. and A. J. Szwedek (eds)(2001)Towards a history of linguistics in Poland: from the early beginnings to the end of the twentieth century, Benjamins, John Publishing Company - Part II: Portraits of Major Polish Linguists. Chapter 8 Mikołaj Rudnicki’s General Linguistic Conceptions by Jerzy Bańczerowski.
