= Ligota-Ligocka Kuźnia =

- Rybnik District
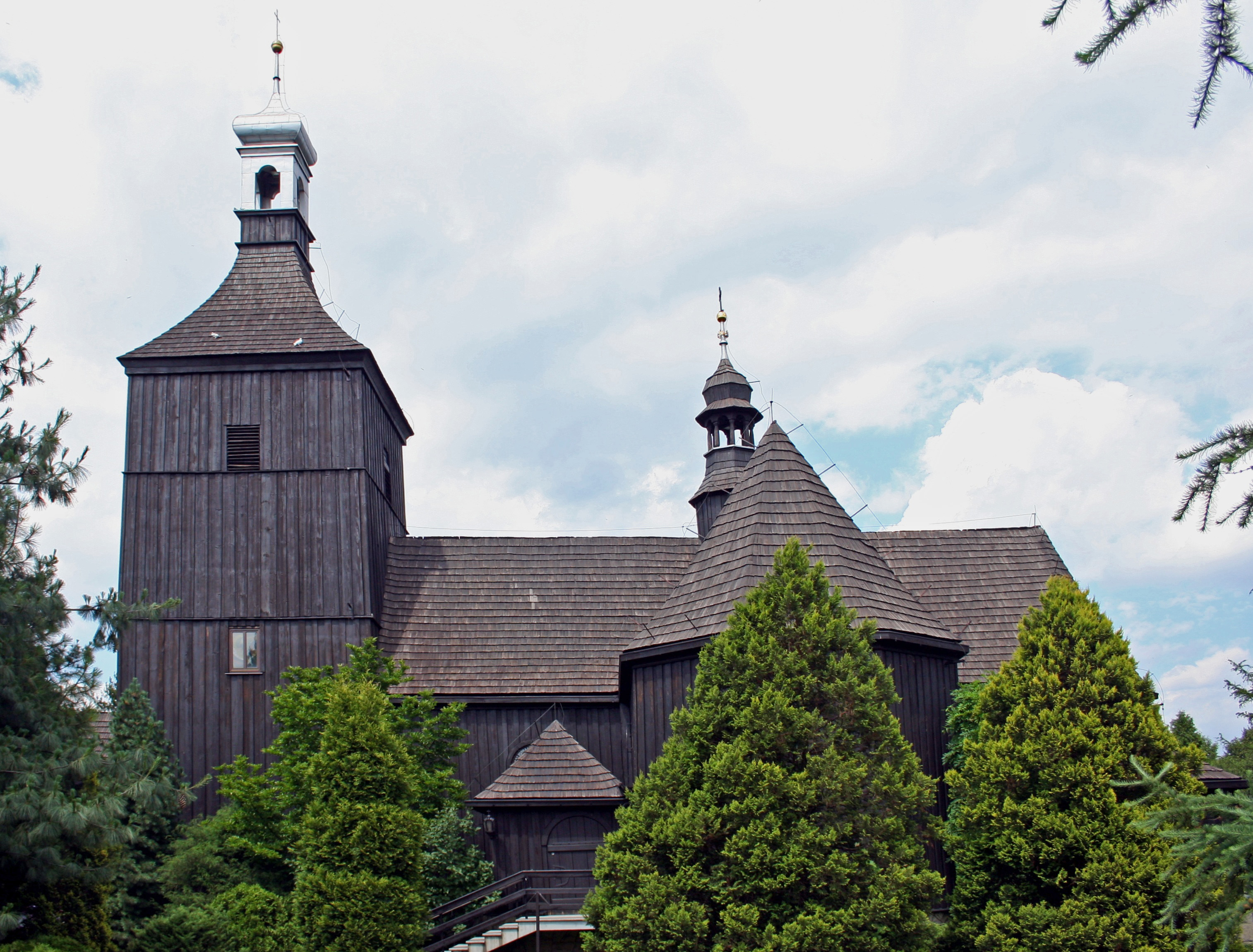
- Saint Lawrance church

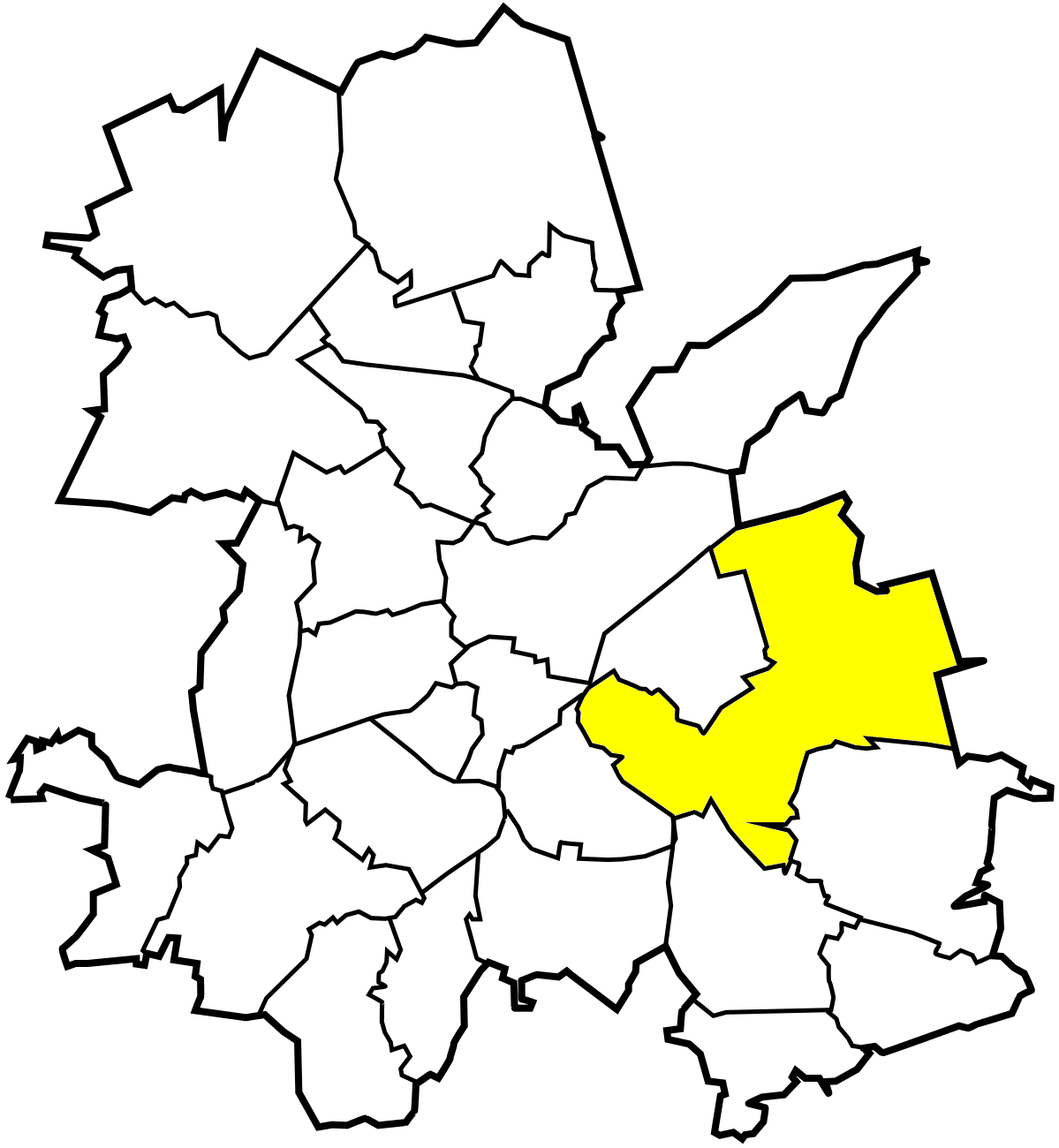
- Location of Ligota-Ligocka Kuźnia within Rybnik
- Coordinates: 50.090251°N 18.596852°E
- Country: Poland
- Voivodeship: Silesian
- County/City: Rybnik

Population (2021)
  - Total: 4,028
- Time zone: UTC+1 (CET)
  - Summer (DST): UTC+2 (CEST)
- Postal code: 44-203
- Area code: (+48) 032

Ligota-Ligocka Kuźnia is a district of Rybnik, in Upper Silesia, Silesian Voivodeship, southern Poland. in 2021, this district had 4,028 inhabitants

The district encompasses three historical settlements:

- Ligota (German: Ellguth),
- Ligocka Kuźnia (German: Ellguther-Hammer, Karstenhütte)
- Raszowiec (German: Ruschowietz or Raschowietz)

Ligota is a common name for villages in Western Poland. The word refers to the medieval custom of village founders being exempt from paying duties to their lords for a period of 5-8 years.

== History ==
In 1740 a small steel mill, called kuźnia (a smithy), was established here. Around it evolved Ligocka Kuźnia. It was modernised in years 1821–1822, but ceased to function in the late 19th century. Raszowiec was first mentioned in 1788. It had, however, always constituted an administrative part of Ligota, even though it belonged to the parish in Boguszowice. After World War I in the Upper Silesia plebiscite 1406 out of 2,195 voters in Ligota voted in favour of joining Poland, against 784 opting for staying in Germany. In 1922 it became a part of Silesian Voivodeship, Second Polish Republic. Ligota (including Ligocka Kuźnia and Raszowiec) was absorbed by Rybnik in 1926.

== Monuments ==
- Church of St. Wawrzyniec in Rybnik
