= Nowa Kuźnia =

Nowa Kuźnia may refer to the following places in Poland:

- Nowa Kuźnia, Bolesławiec County in Lower Silesian Voivodeship (south-west Poland)
- Nowa Kuźnia, Polkowice County in Lower Silesian Voivodeship (south-west Poland)
- Nowa Kuźnia, Opole Voivodeship (south-west Poland)
