= Szydłowiec County =

Szydłowiec County Powiat szydłowiecki
- County
- Flag Coat of arms

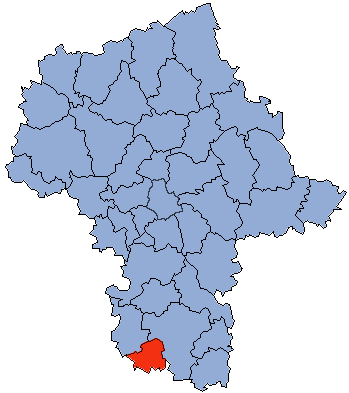
- Location within the voivodeship

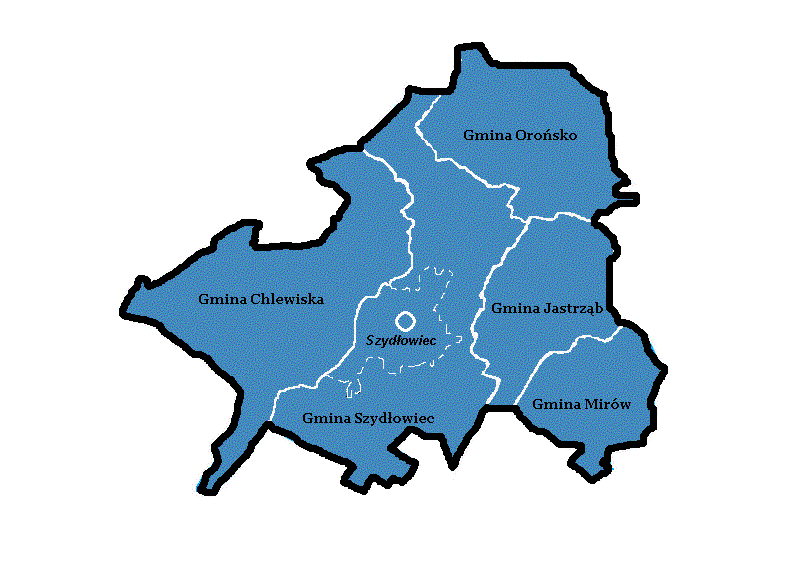
- Division into gminas
- Coordinates (Szydłowiec): 51°14′N 20°51′E
- Country: Poland
- Voivodeship: Masovian
- Seat: Szydłowiec
- Gminas: Total 5: Gmina Chlewiska; Gmina Jastrząb; Gmina Mirów; Gmina Orońsko; Gmina Szydłowiec

Area
  - Total: 452.22 km^{2} (174.60 sq mi)

Population (2019)
  - Total: 39,766
  - Density: 87.935/km^{2} (227.75/sq mi)
  - Urban: 11,736
  - Rural: 28,030
- Car plates: WSZ
- Website: www.szydlowiecpowiat.pl

Szydłowiec County (Polish: powiat szydłowiecki) is a unit of territorial administration and local government (powiat) in Masovian Voivodeship, east-central Poland. It came into being on January 1, 1999, as a result of the Polish local government reforms passed in 1998. Its administrative seat is Szydłowiec, which lies 110 kilometres (68 mi) south of Warsaw.

The county covers an area of 452.22 square kilometres (174.6 sq mi). As of 2019 its total population is 39,766, out of which the population of Szydłowiec is 11,736, and the rural population is 28,030.

== Neighbouring counties ==
Szydłowiec County is bordered by Radom County to the north-east, Starachowice County to the south-east, Skarżysko County to the south, Końskie County to the west and Przysucha County to the north-west.

== Administrative divisions ==
The county is subdivided into five gminas (two urban-rural and three rural). These are listed in the following table, in descending order of population.

Gmina	Type	Area (km^{2})	Population (2019)	Seat
Gmina Szydłowiec	urban-rural	138.2	18,764	Szydłowiec
Gmina Orońsko	rural	81.9	5,971	Orońsko
Gmina Chlewiska	rural	124.2	5,939	Chlewiska
Gmina Jastrząb	urban-rural	54.8	5,192	Jastrząb
Gmina Mirów	rural	53.1	3,900	Mirów
