= Grzybowa Góra =

- Village
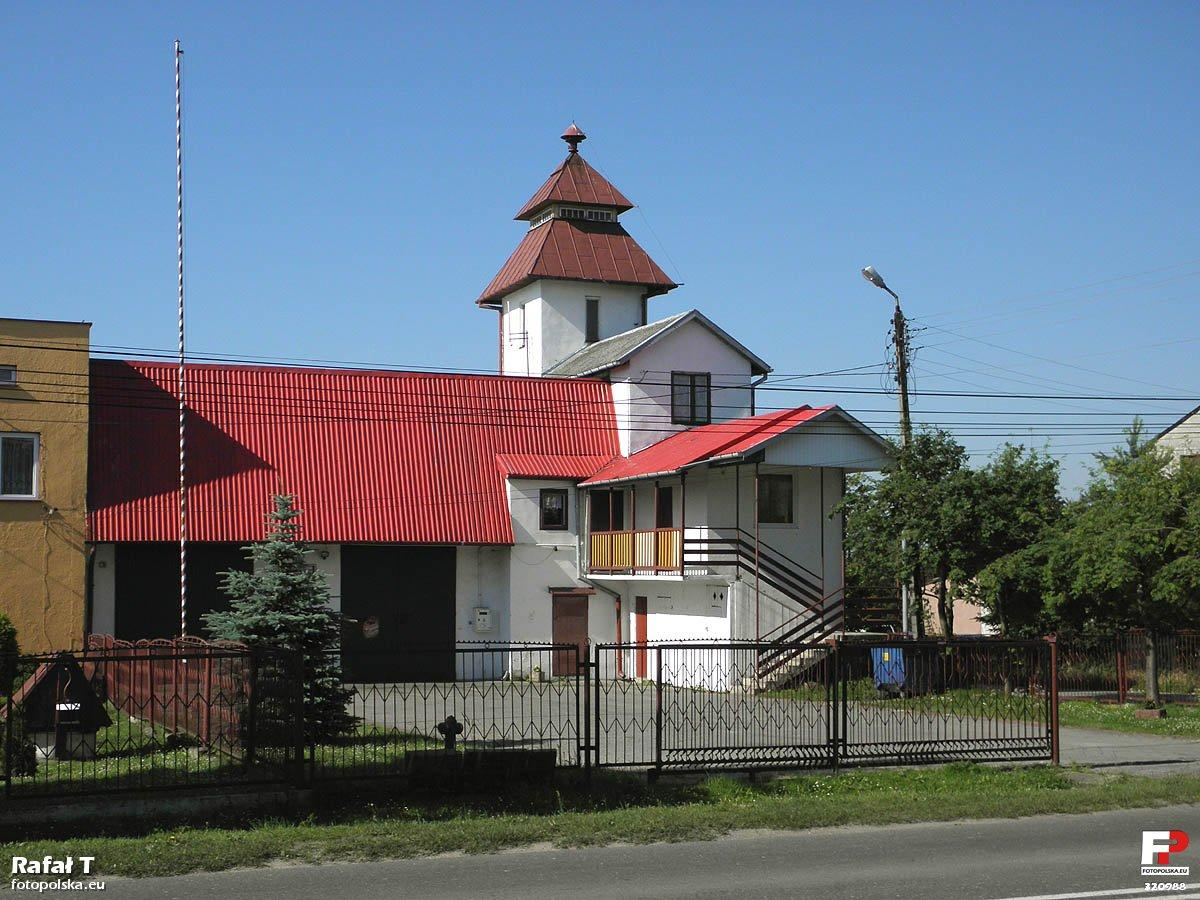
- Voluntary Fire Brigade in Grzybowa Góra

- Location within Poland
- Coordinates: 51°7′52″N 20°58′19″E
- Country: Poland
- Voivodeship: Świętokrzyskie
- County: Skarżysko
- Gmina: Skarżysko Kościelne
- Population: 1,052
- Time zone: UTC+1 (CET)
  - Summer (DST): UTC+2 (CEST)
- Vehicle registration: TSK

Grzybowa Góra [ɡʐɨˈbɔva ˈɡura] is a village in the administrative district of Gmina Skarżysko Kościelne, within Skarżysko County, Świętokrzyskie Voivodeship, in south-central Poland. It lies approximately 5 km (3 mi) east of Skarżysko Kościelne, 5 km (3 mi) north-east of Skarżysko-Kamienna, and 38 km (24 mi) northeast of the regional capital Kielce. The name literally translates as: "Mushroom Mountain".

== History ==
Grzybowa Góra was the location of a Paleolithic industrial settlement, which is now an archaeological site, part of the Rydno Archaeological Reserve, consisting of several hundred former Paleolithic sites stretching from Skarżysko-Kamienna to Wąchock. The site was discovered in the 1920s.

Grzybowa Góra was a private church village of the Wąchock Abbey, administratively located in the Radom County in the Sandomierz Voivodeship in the Lesser Poland Province of the Polish Crown.

In the Third Partition of Poland, in 1795, the village was annexed by Austria. Following the Austro-Polish War of 1809, the village was regained by Poles and included within the short-lived Duchy of Warsaw. After the duchy's dissolution, in 1815, the village fell to the Russian Partition of Poland. In 1827, it had a population of 204, which grew to 293 until the late 19th century. On 19 April 1863 Grzybowa Góra was the site of a battle of the Polish January Uprising. A Polish insurgent unit led by Ludwik Michalski defeated a three times larger Russian unit, and the surviving Russian soldiers retreated in panic to Radom. Following World War I, in 1918, Poland regained independence and control of the village.
