= Kucębów =

Kucębówi
- Village
- Location within Poland
- Coordinates: 51°4′17″N 20°37′9″E
- Country: Poland
- Voivodeship: Świętokrzyskie
- County: Skarżysko
- Gmina: Bliżyn
- Population: 380

Kucębów [kuˈt͡sɛmbuf] is a village in the administrative district of Gmina Bliżyn, within Skarżysko County, Świętokrzyskie Voivodeship, in south-central Poland. It lies approximately 11 km (7 mi) south-west of Bliżyn, 22 km (14 mi) west of Skarżysko-Kamienna, and 21 km (13 mi) north of the regional capital Kielce.
