= Wołów, Świętokrzyskie Voivodeship =

Wołów
- Village
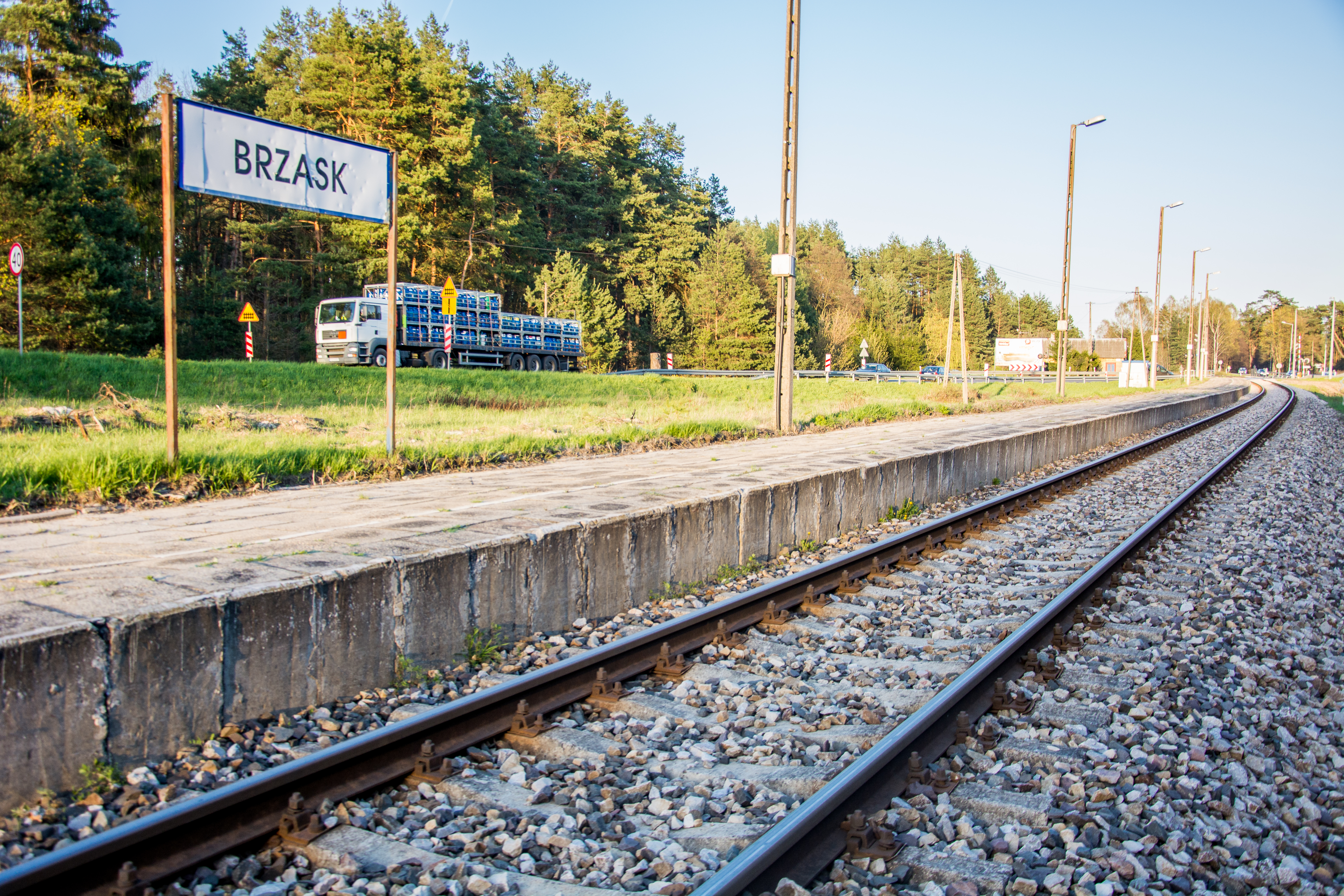

- Location within Poland
- Coordinates: 51°5′37″N 20°47′49″E
- Country: Poland
- Voivodeship: Świętokrzyskie
- County: Skarżysko
- Gmina: Bliżyn
- Population: 310

Wołów [ˈvɔwuf] is a village in the administrative district of Gmina Bliżyn, within Skarżysko County, Świętokrzyskie Voivodeship, in south-central Poland. It lies approximately 4 km (2 mi) south-east of Bliżyn, 9 km (6 mi) west of Skarżysko-Kamienna, and 27 km (17 mi) north-east of the regional capital Kielce.
