= Michałów, Skarżysko County =

Michałów
- Village
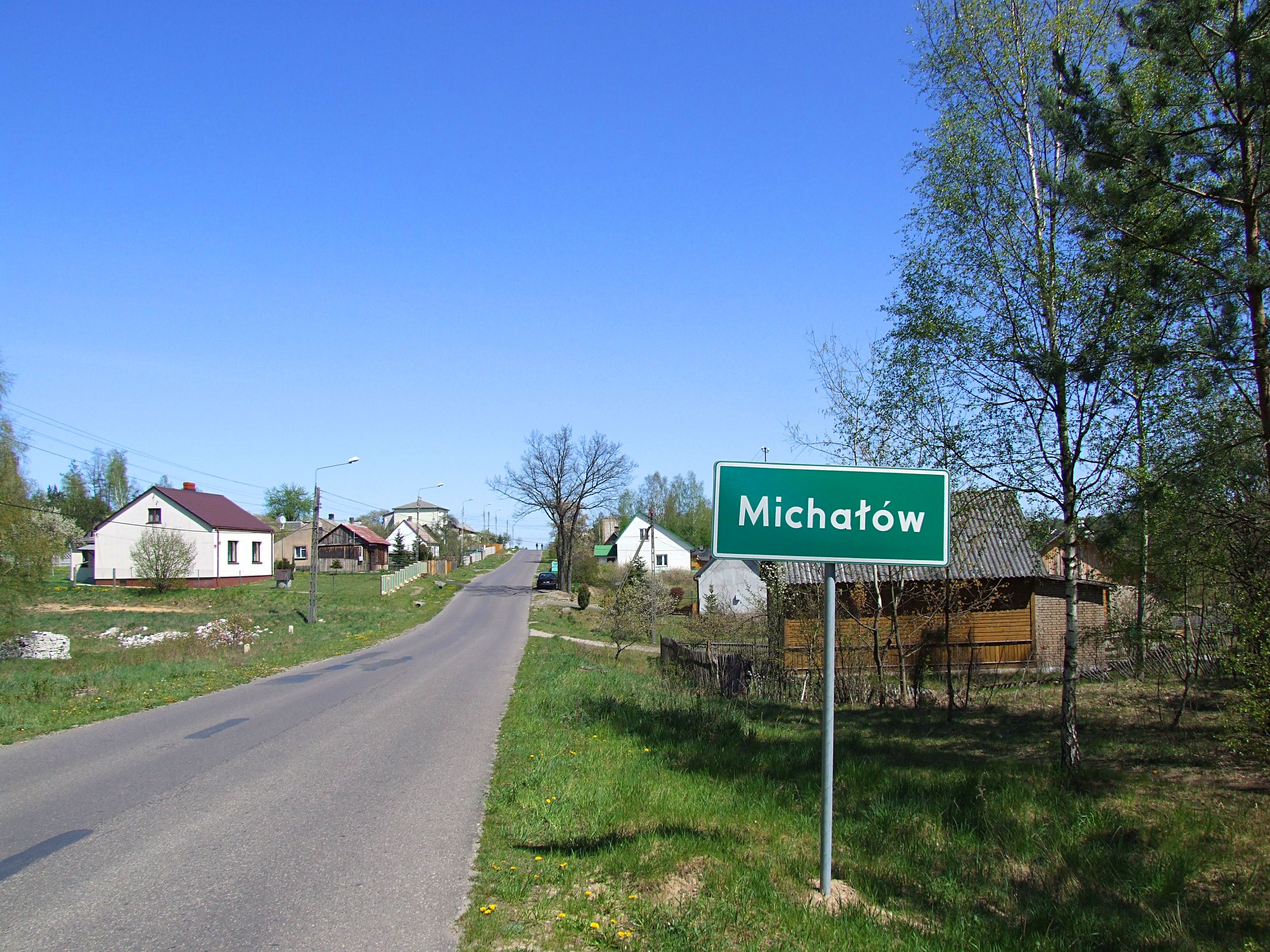

- Location within Poland
- Coordinates: 51°5′56″N 20°55′58″E
- Country: Poland
- Voivodeship: Świętokrzyskie
- County: Skarżysko
- Gmina: Skarżysko Kościelne
- Population: 270

Michałów [miˈxawuf] is a village in the administrative district of Gmina Skarżysko Kościelne, within Skarżysko County, Świętokrzyskie Voivodeship, in south-central Poland. It lies approximately 5 km (3 mi) south of Skarżysko Kościelne, 3 km (2 mi) south-east of Skarżysko-Kamienna, and 33 km (21 mi) north-east of the regional capital Kielce.
