= Zbrojów =

- Village
- Location within Poland
- Coordinates: 51°6′19″N 20°42′14″E
- Country: Poland
- Voivodeship: Świętokrzyskie
- County: Skarżysko
- Gmina: Bliżyn
- Population: 210

Zbrojów [ˈzbrɔjuf] is a village in the administrative district of Gmina Bliżyn, within Skarżysko County, Świętokrzyskie Voivodeship, in south-central Poland. It lies approximately 4 km (2 mi) west of Bliżyn, 15 km (9 mi) west of Skarżysko-Kamienna, and 26 km (16 mi) north of the regional capital Kielce.
