= Bugaj, Skarżysko County =

Bugaj
- Village
- Location within Poland
- Coordinates: 51°5′56″N 20°48′0″E
- Country: Poland
- Voivodeship: Świętokrzyskie
- County: Skarżysko
- Gmina: Bliżyn

Bugaj [ˈbuɡai̯] is a village in the administrative district of Gmina Bliżyn, within Skarżysko County, Świętokrzyskie Voivodeship, in south-central Poland. It lies approximately 4 km (2 mi) east of Bliżyn, 9 km (6 mi) west of Skarżysko-Kamienna, and 28 km (17 mi) north-east of the regional capital Kielce.
