= Gilów, Świętokrzyskie Voivodeship =

Gilów
- Village
- Location within Poland
- Coordinates: 51°7′16″N 20°44′23″E
- Country: Poland
- Voivodeship: Świętokrzyskie
- County: Skarżysko
- Gmina: Bliżyn
- Population: 400

Gilów [ˈɡiluf] is a village in the administrative district of Gmina Bliżyn, within Skarżysko County, Świętokrzyskie Voivodeship, in south-central Poland. It lies approximately 2 km (1 mi) north-west of Bliżyn, 13 km (8 mi) west of Skarżysko-Kamienna, and 28 km (17 mi) north of the regional capital Kielce.
