= Skarżysko =

Skarżysko may refer to the following places:

- Skarżysko-Kamienna, city in Skarżysko County (central Poland)
- Skarżysko Kościelne, village in Skarżysko County (central Poland)
- Skarżysko Książęce, district of Skarżysko-Kamienna, until 2001 independent town
