= Brzeście, Skarżysko County =

Brzeście
- Village
- Location within Poland
- Coordinates: 51°6′6″N 20°47′16″E
- Country: Poland
- Voivodeship: Świętokrzyskie
- County: Skarżysko
- Gmina: Bliżyn
- Population: 270

Brzeście [ˈbʐɛɕt͡ɕɛ] is a village in the administrative district of Gmina Bliżyn, within Skarżysko County, Świętokrzyskie Voivodeship, in south-central Poland. It lies approximately 3 km (2 mi) east of Bliżyn, 10 km (6 mi) west of Skarżysko-Kamienna, and 28 km (17 mi) north-east of the regional capital Kielce.
