= Płaczków =

- Village
- Location within Poland
- Coordinates: 51°7′51″N 20°41′58″E
- Country: Poland
- Voivodeship: Świętokrzyskie
- County: Skarżysko
- Gmina: Bliżyn
- Population: 480

Płaczków [ˈpwat͡ʂkuf] is a village in the administrative district of Gmina Bliżyn, within Skarżysko County, Świętokrzyskie Voivodeship, in south-central Poland. It lies approximately 5 km (3 mi) north-west of Bliżyn, 16 km (10 mi) west of Skarżysko-Kamienna, and 29 km (18 mi) north of the regional capital Kielce.
