= Lipowski =

Lipowski (feminine Lipowska, Polish and Jewish (Ashkenazic): habitational name for someone from any of various places called Lipowo, Lipowa or Lipowe) is a Polish surname. Notable people with the surname include:

- Jan Lipowski (1912–1996), Polish alpine skier
- Teresa Lipowska (born 1937), Polish actress
- Zbigniew J. Lipowski (1924–1997), Polish psychiatrist

== See also ==
- Lipovsky (disambiguation)
