= Jastrzębia, Świętokrzyskie Voivodeship =

Jastrzębia
- Village
- Location within Poland
- Coordinates: 51°5′37″N 20°43′44″E
- Country: Poland
- Voivodeship: Świętokrzyskie
- County: Skarżysko
- Gmina: Bliżyn
- Population: 90

Jastrzębia [jasˈtʂɛmbja] is a village in the administrative district of Gmina Bliżyn, within Skarżysko County, Świętokrzyskie Voivodeship, in south-central Poland. It lies approximately 3 km (2 mi) south-west of Bliżyn, 14 km (9 mi) west of Skarżysko-Kamienna, and 25 km (16 mi) north of the regional capital Kielce.
