= Nowy Odrowążek =

- Village
- Location within Poland
- Coordinates: 51°5′43″N 20°38′10″E
- Country: Poland
- Voivodeship: Świętokrzyskie
- County: Skarżysko
- Gmina: Bliżyn
- Population: 240

Nowy Odrowążek [ˈnɔvɨ ɔdrɔˈvɔ̃ʐɛk] is a village in the administrative district of Gmina Bliżyn, within Skarżysko County, Świętokrzyskie Voivodeship, in south-central Poland. It lies approximately 9 km (6 mi) west of Bliżyn, 20 km (12 mi) west of Skarżysko-Kamienna, and 24 km (15 mi) north of the regional capital Kielce.
