= Kierz Niedźwiedzi =

- Village
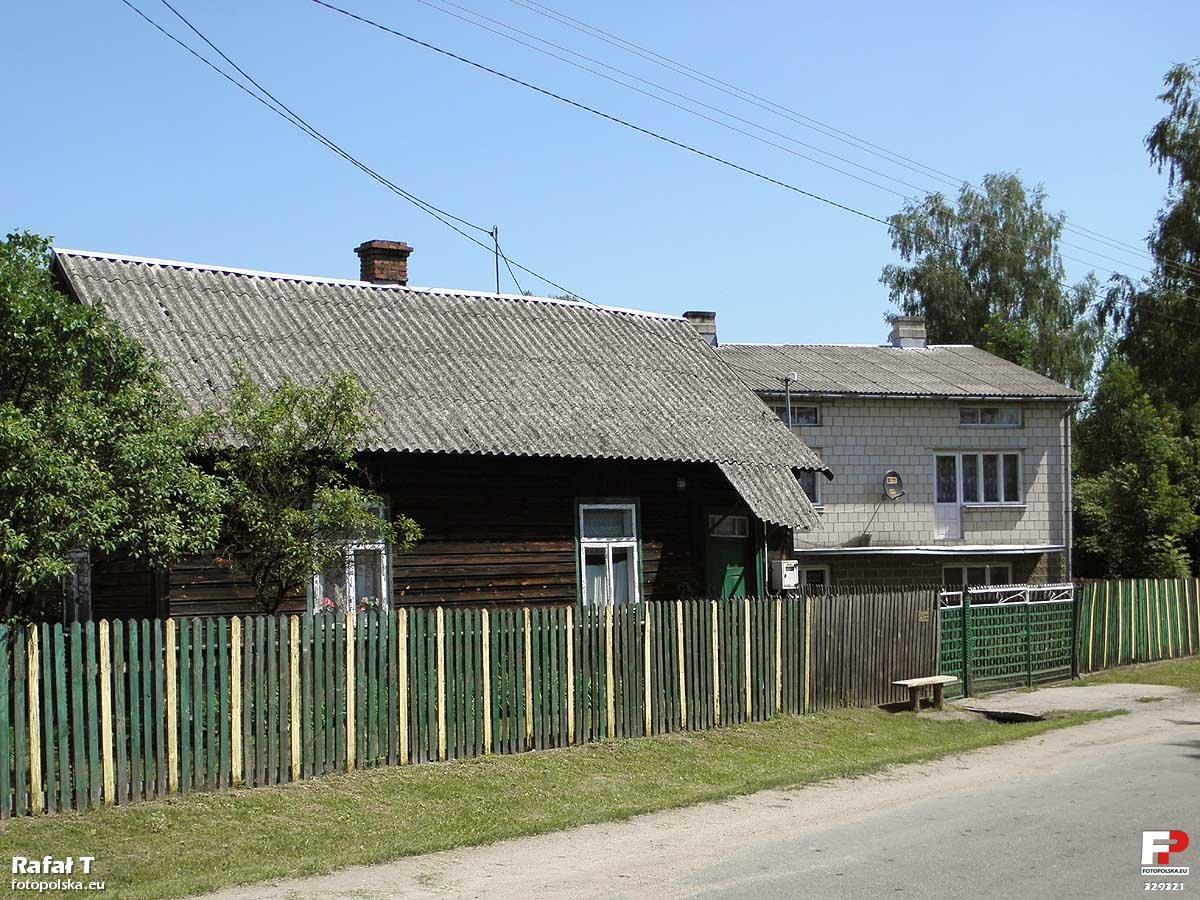

- Location within Poland
- Coordinates: 51°10′29″N 20°56′42″E
- Country: Poland
- Voivodeship: Świętokrzyskie
- County: Skarżysko
- Gmina: Skarżysko Kościelne
- Highest elevation: 300 m (980 ft)
- Lowest elevation: 200 m (660 ft)
- Population: 740
- Website: http://www.kierz.pl/

Kierz Niedźwiedzi [ˈkʲɛʂ ɲɛd͡ʑˈvjɛd͡ʑi] is a village in the administrative district of Gmina Skarżysko Kościelne, within Skarżysko County, Świętokrzyskie Voivodeship, in south-central Poland. It lies approximately 5 km (3 mi) north-east of Skarżysko Kościelne, 7 km (4 mi) north of Skarżysko-Kamienna, and 40 km (25 mi) north-east of the regional capital Kielce.
