= Gostków, Świętokrzyskie Voivodeship =

Gostków
- Village
- Location within Poland
- Coordinates: 51°7′19″N 20°45′9″E
- Country: Poland
- Voivodeship: Świętokrzyskie
- County: Skarżysko
- Gmina: Bliżyn
- Population: 360

Gostków [ˈɡɔstkuf] is a village in the administrative district of Gmina Bliżyn, within Skarżysko County, Świętokrzyskie Voivodeship, in south-central Poland. It lies approximately 2 km (1 mi) north of Bliżyn, 12 km (7 mi) west of Skarżysko-Kamienna, and 29 km (18 mi) north of the regional capital Kielce.
