= Sobótka, Skarżysko County =

Sobótka
- Village
- Location within Poland
- Coordinates: 51°8′50″N 20°41′24″E
- Country: Poland
- Voivodeship: Świętokrzyskie
- County: Skarżysko
- Gmina: Bliżyn
- Population: 230

Sobótka [sɔˈbutka] is a village in the administrative district of Gmina Bliżyn, within Skarżysko County, Świętokrzyskie Voivodeship, in south-central Poland. It lies approximately 7 km (4 mi) north-west of Bliżyn, 17 km (11 mi) west of Skarżysko-Kamienna, and 30 km (19 mi) north of the regional capital Kielce.
