= Majków, Świętokrzyskie Voivodeship =

Majków
- Village
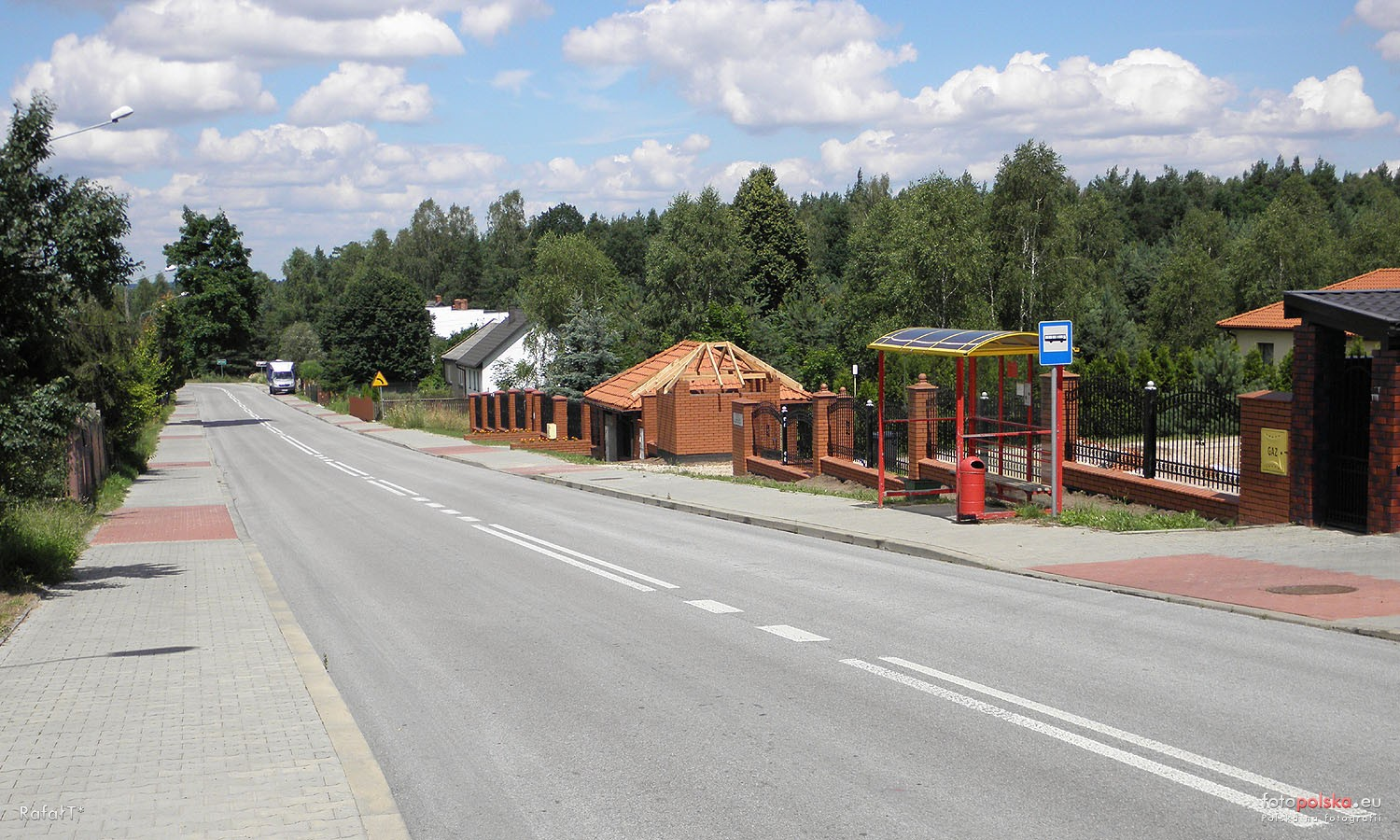

- Location within Poland
- Coordinates: 51°5′40″N 20°54′42″E
- Country: Poland
- Voivodeship: Świętokrzyskie
- County: Skarżysko
- Gmina: Skarżysko Kościelne
- Elevation: 250 m (820 ft)
- Population: 948

Majków (Polish pronunciation: [ˈmajkuf]) is a village in the administrative district of Gmina Skarżysko Kościelne, within Skarżysko County, Świętokrzyskie Voivodeship, in south-central Poland. It lies approximately 5 km (3 mi) south of Skarżysko Kościelne, 3 km (2 mi) south of Skarżysko-Kamienna, and 32 km (20 mi) north-east of the regional capital Kielce.
