= Zagórze, Gmina Bliżyn =

Zagórze
- Village
- Location within Poland
- Coordinates: 51°6′51″N 20°47′34″E
- Country: Poland
- Voivodeship: Świętokrzyskie
- County: Skarżysko
- Gmina: Bliżyn
- Population: 270

Zagórze [zaˈɡuʐɛ] is a village in the administrative district of Gmina Bliżyn, within Skarżysko County, Świętokrzyskie Voivodeship, in south-central Poland. It lies approximately 3 km (2 mi) east of Bliżyn, 9 km (6 mi) west of Skarżysko-Kamienna, and 29 km (18 mi) north-east of the regional capital Kielce.
