= Rędocin =

- Village
- Location within Poland
- Coordinates: 51°10′6″N 20°43′14″E
- Country: Poland
- Voivodeship: Świętokrzyskie
- County: Skarżysko
- Gmina: Bliżyn
- Population: 80

Rędocin [rɛnˈdɔt͡ɕin] is a village in the administrative district of Gmina Bliżyn, within Skarżysko County, Świętokrzyskie Voivodeship, in south-central Poland. It lies approximately 8 km (5 mi) north of Bliżyn, 15 km (9 mi) north-west of Skarżysko-Kamienna, and 33 km (21 mi) north of the regional capital Kielce.
