= Nowki =

- Village
- Location within Poland
- Coordinates: 51°6′14″N 20°40′18″E
- Country: Poland
- Voivodeship: Świętokrzyskie
- County: Skarżysko
- Gmina: Bliżyn
- Population: 150

Nowki [ˈnɔfki] is a village in the administrative district of Gmina Bliżyn, within Skarżysko County, Świętokrzyskie Voivodeship, in south-central Poland. It lies approximately 6 km (4 mi) west of Bliżyn, 18 km (11 mi) west of Skarżysko-Kamienna, and 25 km (16 mi) north of the regional capital Kielce.
