= Ubyszów =

- Village
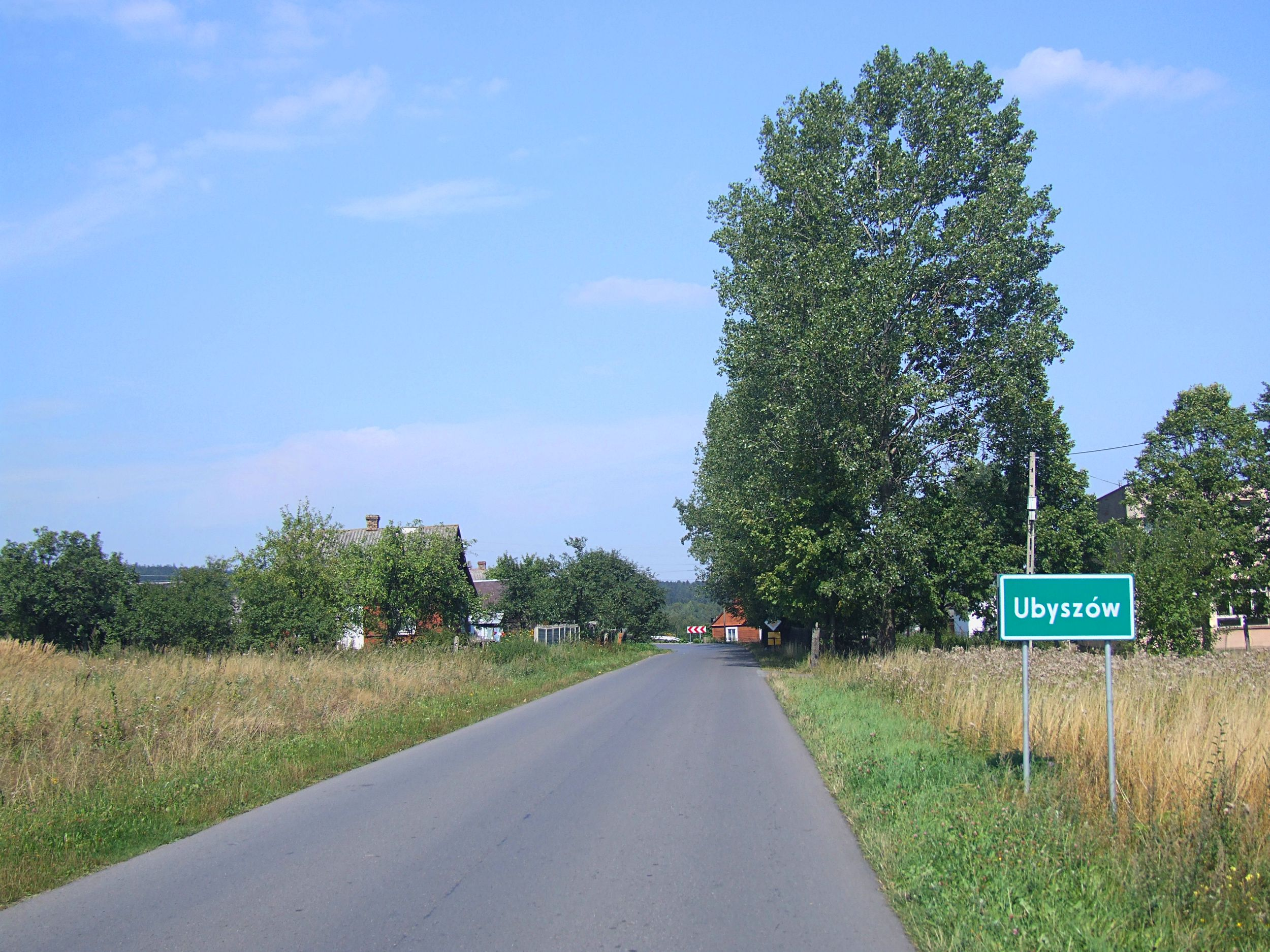

- Location within Poland
- Coordinates: 51°7′49″N 20°46′0″E
- Country: Poland
- Voivodeship: Świętokrzyskie
- County: Skarżysko
- Gmina: Bliżyn
- Population: 380

Ubyszów [uˈbɨʂuf] is a village in the administrative district of Gmina Bliżyn, within Skarżysko County, Świętokrzyskie Voivodeship, in south-central Poland. It lies approximately 3 km (2 mi) north of Bliżyn, 11 km (7 mi) west of Skarżysko-Kamienna, and 30 km (19 mi) north of the regional capital Kielce.
