= Wojtyniów =

- Village
- Location within Poland
- Coordinates: 51°5′57″N 20°45′58″E
- Country: Poland
- Voivodeship: Świętokrzyskie
- County: Skarżysko
- Gmina: Bliżyn
- Population: 460

Wojtyniów [vɔi̯ˈtɨɲuf] is a village in the administrative district of Gmina Bliżyn, within Skarżysko County, Świętokrzyskie Voivodeship, in south-central Poland. It lies approximately 2 km (1 mi) south-east of Bliżyn, 11 km (7 mi) west of Skarżysko-Kamienna, and 27 km (17 mi) north-east of the regional capital Kielce.
