= Świerczek, Świętokrzyskie Voivodeship =

Świerczek
- Village
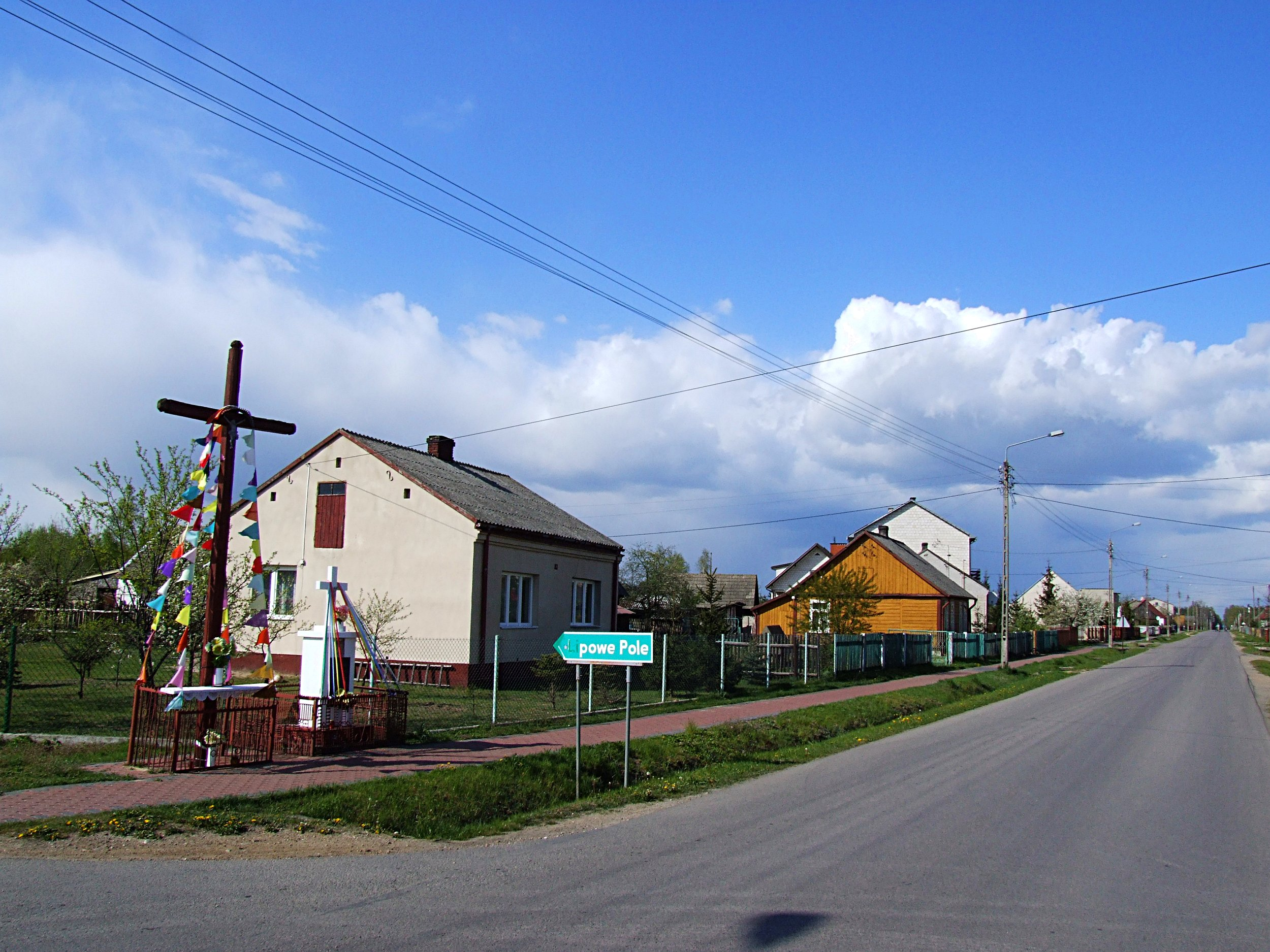

- Location within Poland
- Coordinates: 51°9′36″N 20°54′48″E
- Country: Poland
- Voivodeship: Świętokrzyskie
- County: Skarżysko
- Gmina: Skarżysko Kościelne
- Population: 360

Świerczek (Polish pronunciation: [ˈɕfjɛrt͡ʂɛk]) is a village in the administrative district of Gmina Skarżysko Kościelne, within Skarżysko County, Świętokrzyskie Voivodeship, in south-central Poland. It lies approximately 3 km (2 mi) north of Skarżysko Kościelne, 5 km (3 mi) north of Skarżysko-Kamienna, and 38 km (24 mi) north-east of the regional capital Kielce.
