= Mroczków =

- Village
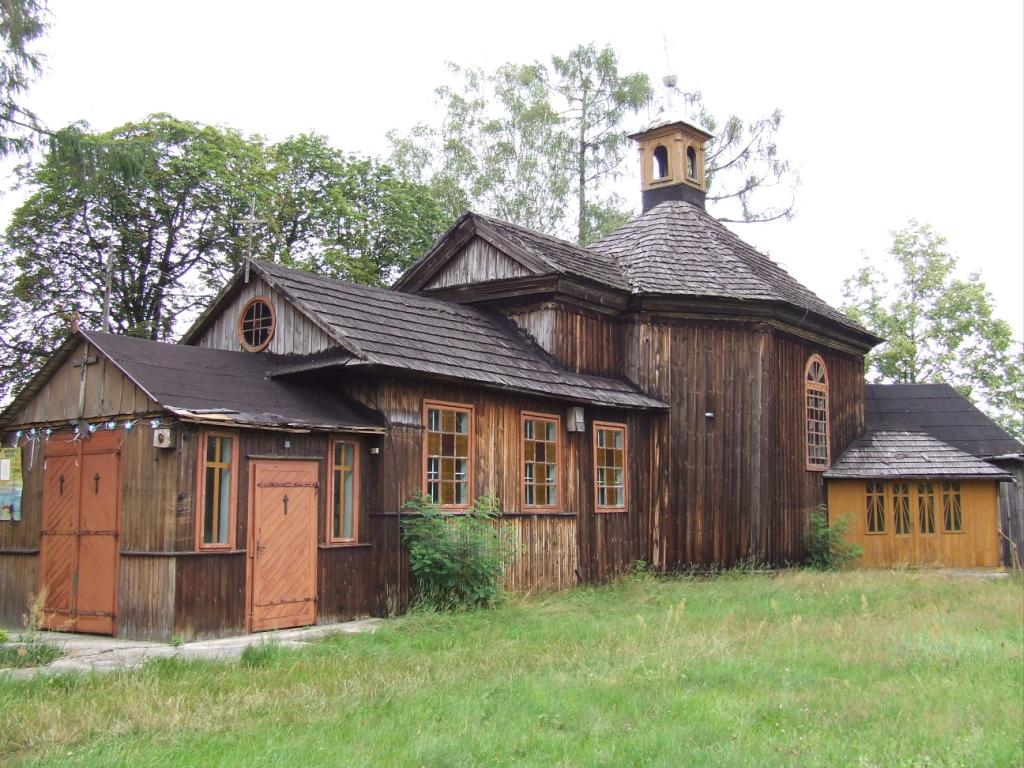
- Catholic church

- Location within Poland
- Coordinates: 51°8′12″N 20°42′16″E
- Country: Poland
- Voivodeship: Świętokrzyskie
- County: Skarżysko
- Gmina: Bliżyn
- Population: 630

Mroczków (Polish pronunciation: [ˈmrɔt͡ʂkuf]) is a village in the administrative district of Gmina Bliżyn, within Skarżysko County, Świętokrzyskie Voivodeship, in south-central Poland. It lies approximately 5 km (3 mi) north-west of Bliżyn, 15 km (9 mi) west of Skarżysko-Kamienna, and 29 km (18 mi) north of the regional capital Kielce.
