= Sołtyków, Świętokrzyskie Voivodeship =

Sołtyków
- Village
- Location within Poland
- Coordinates: 51°8′22″N 20°41′14″E
- Country: Poland
- Voivodeship: Świętokrzyskie
- County: Skarżysko
- Gmina: Bliżyn
- Population: 230

Sołtyków [sɔu̯ˈtɨkuf] is a village in the administrative district of Gmina Bliżyn, within Skarżysko County, Świętokrzyskie Voivodeship, in south-central Poland. It lies approximately 6 km (4 mi) north-west of Bliżyn, 17 km (11 mi) west of Skarżysko-Kamienna, and 29 km (18 mi) north of the regional capital Kielce.
