= Lipowe Pole Skarbowe =

- Village
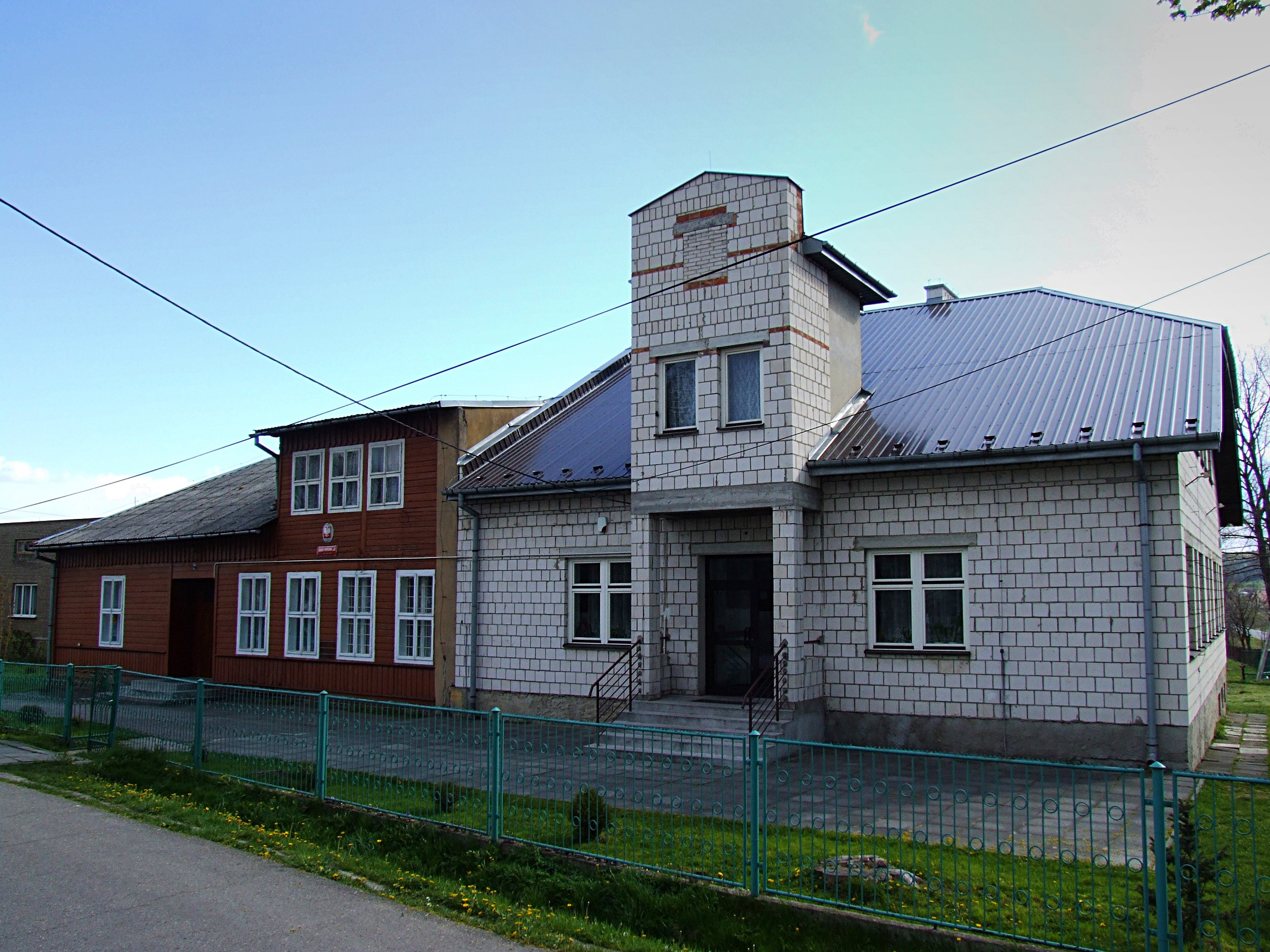
- School

- Location within Poland
- Coordinates: 51°8′45″N 20°53′16″E
- Country: Poland
- Voivodeship: Świętokrzyskie
- County: Skarżysko
- Gmina: Skarżysko Kościelne

Lipowe Pole Skarbowe [liˈpɔvɛ ˈpɔlɛ skarˈbɔvɛ] is a village in the administrative district of Gmina Skarżysko Kościelne, within Skarżysko County, Świętokrzyskie Voivodeship, in south-central Poland. It lies approximately 3 km (2 mi) north-west of Skarżysko Kościelne, 4 km (2 mi) north-west of Skarżysko-Kamienna, and 35 km (22 mi) north-east of the regional capital Kielce.
