= Lipowe Pole Plebańskie =

- Village
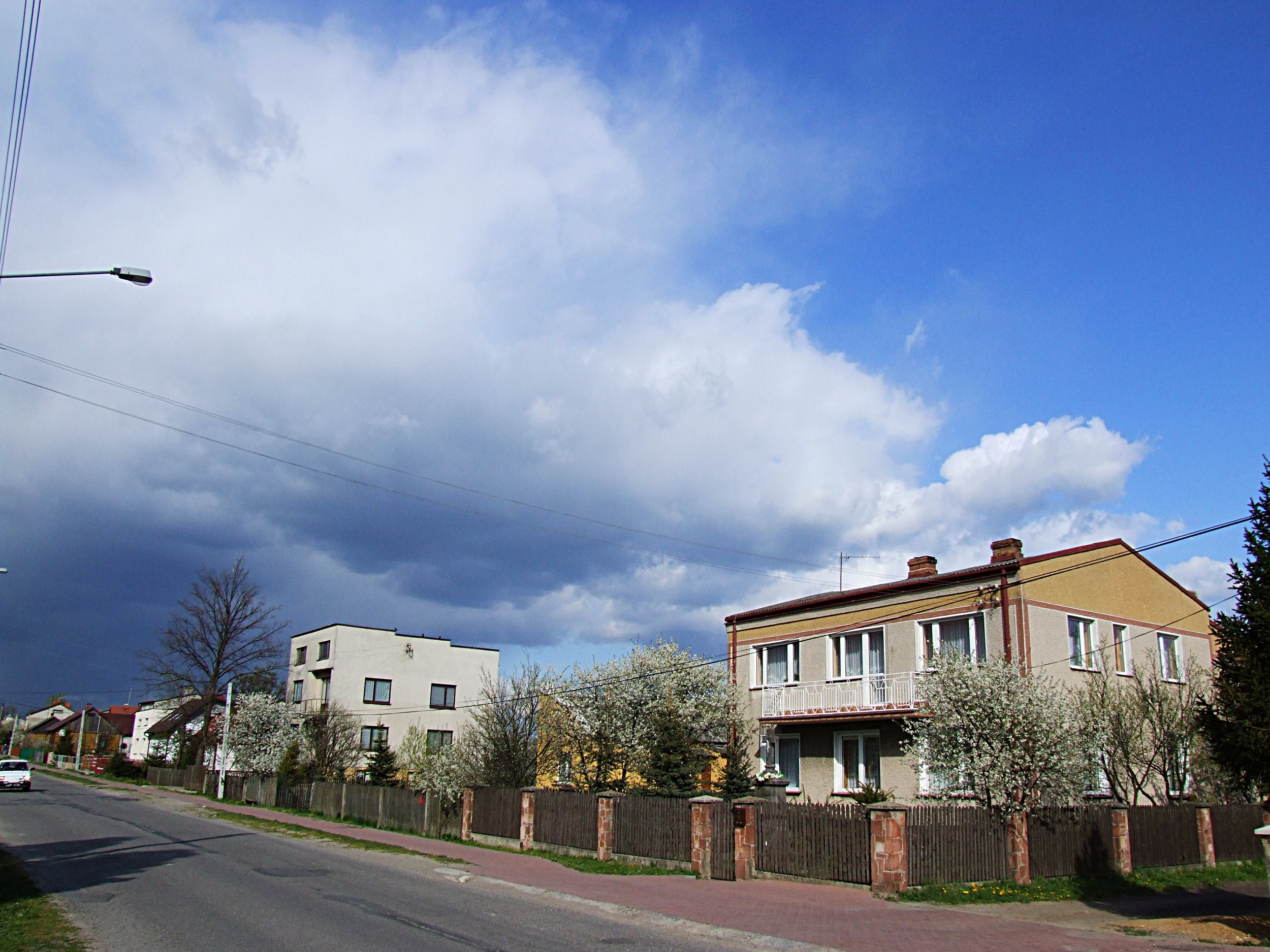

- Location within Poland
- Coordinates: 51°9′17″N 20°53′46″E
- Country: Poland
- Voivodeship: Świętokrzyskie
- County: Skarżysko
- Gmina: Skarżysko Kościelne
- Population: 720

Lipowe Pole Plebańskie [liˈpɔvɛ ˈpɔlɛ plɛˈbaɲskʲɛ] is a village in the administrative district of Gmina Skarżysko Kościelne, within Skarżysko County, Świętokrzyskie Voivodeship, in south-central Poland. It lies approximately 3 km (2 mi) north-west of Skarżysko Kościelne, 5 km (3 mi) north of Skarżysko-Kamienna, and 36 km (22 mi) north-east of the regional capital Kielce.
