= Kopcie, Świętokrzyskie Voivodeship =

Kopcie
- Village
- Location within Poland
- Coordinates: 51°4′8″N 20°38′40″E
- Country: Poland
- Voivodeship: Świętokrzyskie
- County: Skarżysko
- Gmina: Bliżyn
- Population: 172

Kopcie [ˈkɔpt͡ɕɛ] is a village in the administrative district of Gmina Bliżyn, within Skarżysko County, Świętokrzyskie Voivodeship, in south-central Poland. It lies approximately 10 km (6 mi) south-west of Bliżyn, 20 km (12 mi) west of Skarżysko-Kamienna, and 21 km (13 mi) north of the regional capital Kielce.
