= Kopcie =

Kopcie may refer to the following places:

- Kopcie, Gmina Domanice in Masovian Voivodeship (east-central Poland)
- Kopcie, Subcarpathian Voivodeship (south-east Poland)
- Kopcie, Świętokrzyskie Voivodeship (south-central Poland)
- Kopcie, Gmina Suchożebry in Masovian Voivodeship (east-central Poland)
- Kopcie, Węgrów County in Masovian Voivodeship (east-central Poland)
