= Lipowe =

Lipowe may refer to the following places in Poland:

- Lipowe, Limanowa County, village in the administrative district of Gmina Limanowa, within Limanowa County, Lesser Poland Voivodeship, in southern Poland

== See also ==
- Lipowe Pole Plebańskie, village in the administrative district of Gmina Skarżysko Kościelne, within Skarżysko County, Świętokrzyskie Voivodeship, in south-central Poland
- Lipowe Pole Skarbowe, village in the administrative district of Gmina Skarżysko Kościelne, within Skarżysko County, Świętokrzyskie Voivodeship, in south-central Poland
