= Lipovsky (disambiguation) =

Lipovsky or Lipovský (Russian: Липовский) may refer to:

- Lipovsky, rural locality (a khutor) in Perelazovskoye Rural Settlement, Kletsky District, Volgograd Oblast, Russia

== People with the surname ==
- Miroslav Lipovský (1976), Slovak ice hockey player
- Zach Lipovsky, Canadian director, former child actor and visual effects specialist

== See also ==
- Lipowski
