= Gmina Bliżyn =

Gmina Bliżyn Bliżyn Commune
- Gmina
- Coat of arms
- Interactive map of Gmina Bliżyn
- Coordinates (Bliżyn): 51°6′32″N 20°45′24″E
- Country: Poland
- Voivodeship: Świętokrzyskie
- County: Skarżysko
- Seat: Bliżyn

Area
  - Total: 141.08 km^{2} (54.47 sq mi)

Population (2006)
  - Total: 8,617
  - Density: 61.08/km^{2} (158.2/sq mi)
- Website: http://www.blizyn.pl

Gmina Bliżyn is a rural gmina (administrative district) in Skarżysko County, Świętokrzyskie Voivodeship, in south-central Poland. Its seat is the village of Bliżyn, which lies approximately 12 kilometres (7 mi) west of Skarżysko-Kamienna and 27 km (17 mi) north of the regional capital Kielce.

The gmina covers an area of 141.08 square kilometres (54.5 sq mi), and as of 2006 its total population is 8,617.

The gmina contains part of the protected area called Suchedniów-Oblęgorek Landscape Park.

== Villages ==
Gmina Bliżyn contains the villages and settlements of Bliżyn, Brzeście, Bugaj, Drożdżów, Gilów, Górki, Gostków, Jastrzębia, Kopcie, Kucębów, Mroczków, Nowki, Nowy Odrowążek, Odrowążek, Płaczków, Rędocin, Sobótka, Sołtyków, Sorbin, Ubyszów, Wojtyniów, Wołów, Zagórze and Zbrojów.

== Neighbouring gminas ==
Gmina Bliżyn is bordered by the town of Skarżysko-Kamienna and by the gminas of Chlewiska, Łączna, Stąporków, Suchedniów, Szydłowiec and Zagnańsk.
