= Gmina Skarżysko Kościelne =

Gmina Skarżysko Kościelne Skarżysko Kościelne Commune
- Gmina
- Flag Coat of arms
- Interactive map of Gmina Skarżysko Kościelne
- Coordinates (Skarżysko Kościelne): 51°8′15″N 20°54′51″E
- Country: Poland
- Voivodeship: Świętokrzyskie
- County: Skarżysko
- Seat: Skarżysko Kościelne

Area
  - Total: 53.24 km^{2} (20.56 sq mi)

Population (2006)
  - Total: 6,188
  - Density: 116.2/km^{2} (301.0/sq mi)
- Website: http://www.skarzysko.com.pl

Gmina Skarżysko Kościelne is a rural gmina (administrative district) in Skarżysko County, Świętokrzyskie Voivodeship, in south-central Poland. Its seat is the village of Skarżysko Kościelne, which lies approximately 3 kilometres (2 mi) north of Skarżysko-Kamienna and 36 km (22 mi) north-east of the regional capital Kielce.

The gmina covers an area of 53.24 square kilometres (20.6 sq mi), and as of 2006 its total population is 6,188.

== Villages ==
Gmina Skarżysko Kościelne contains the villages and settlements of Grzybowa Góra, Kierz Niedźwiedzi, Lipowe Pole Plebańskie, Lipowe Pole Skarbowe, Majków, Michałów, Skarżysko Kościelne and Świerczek.

== Neighbouring gminas ==
Gmina Skarżysko Kościelne is bordered by the town of Skarżysko-Kamienna and by the gminas of Mirów, Mirzec, Szydłowiec and Wąchock.
