= Mroczkowski =

Mroczkowski (feminine: Mroczkowska; plural: Mroczkowscy) is a Polish surname. It is a toponymic surname derived from the place name Mroczków.

Notable people with this surname include:

- Anne Mroczkowski (born 1953), Canadian TV reporter
- Antoni Mroczkowski (1896–1970), Polish aviator
- Katarzyna Mroczkowska (born 1980), Polish volleyball player
- Megan Mroczkowski, M.D. (born 1981), American child forensic psychiatrist and Associate Professor of Psychiatry at Columbia University
- Radosław Mroczkowski (born 1967), Polish football manager
- Walery Mroczkowski (1840–1889), Polish insurgent and photographer

== See also ==
- Mruczkowski (disambiguation)
