= Suchedniów-Oblęgorek Landscape Park =

Protected area in Poland

Coordinates: 51.0547°N 20.7079°E

- Suchedniowsko-Oblęgorski Park Krajobrazowy
- IUCN category V (protected landscape/seascape)
- Interactive map of Suchedniów-Oblęgorek Landscape Park
- Location: Świętokrzyskie Voivodeship
- Area: 214.07 km^{2} (82.65 sq mi)
- Established: 1988

Suchedniów-Oblęgorek Landscape Park (Suchedniowsko-Oblęgorski Park Krajobrazowy) is a protected area (Landscape Park) in south-central Poland, established in 1988, covering an area of 214.07 square kilometres (82.65 sq mi).

The Park lies within Świętokrzyskie Voivodeship: in Kielce County (Gmina Miedziana Góra, Gmina Mniów, Gmina Strawczyn), Końskie County (Gmina Stąporków) and Skarżysko County (Gmina Bliżyn, Gmina Łączna, Gmina Suchedniów). It takes its name from the town of Suchedniów and the village of Oblęgorek.

Within the Landscape Park are three nature reserves.
