= Kamienna (river) =

River in Poland

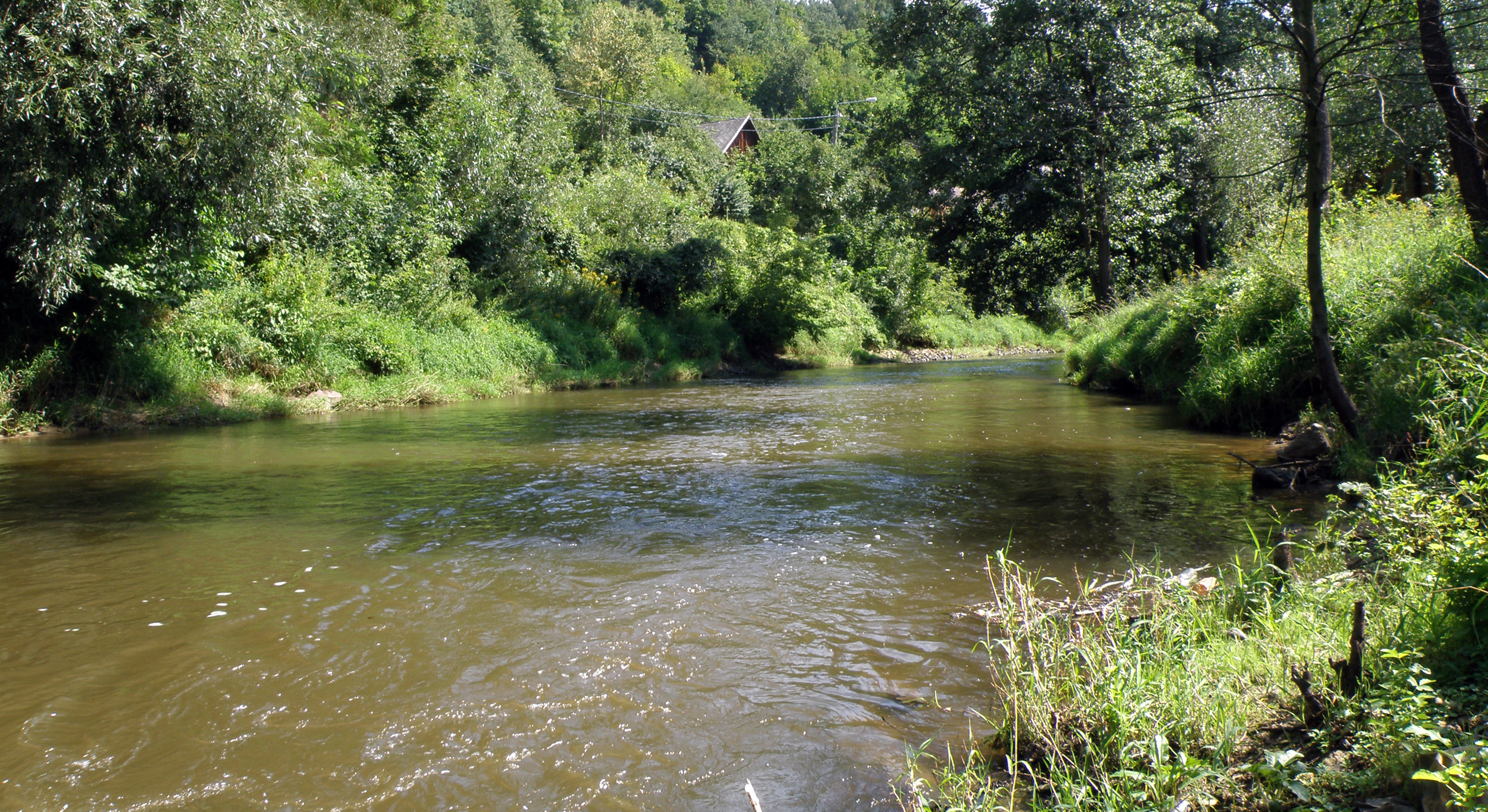
- Kamienna river near Bałtów

Location
- Country: Poland

Physical characteristics
- Mouth
  - location: Vistula
  - coordinates: 51°04′50″N 21°47′31″E

Basin features
- Progression: Vistula→ Baltic Sea

The Kamienna is a river in central Poland, which is a left tributary of the Vistula. Except for its source and mouth, the river flows in Swietokrzyskie Voivodeship. Its length is 138 kilometers, and the area of its basin 2007,9 km^{2}. Geographers argue whether the source of the Kamienna is located in a swampy area near the village of Antoniow (Szydłowiec County, 361 meters above sea level), or near the village of Borki (also Szydłowiec County). This results in differences in calculating the length of the river. Most sources state that it is 138 kilometers long, but by some accounts, the length varies from 127 to 156 kilometers. The mouth of the river lies near the village of Kepa Piotrowinska (Lipsko County).

Unlike other rivers of southern Poland (San or Nida), the Kamienna does not owe its name to the Celts. According to Zygmunt Gloger, the river was first mentioned in 1228. Jan Długosz called it Kamionna, while on an 1815 map it is named Kaimienka. The name is of Slavic origin (the word kamień means stone); in the past it was spelled Camoni (1379), Camyonna (1437), Camyen (1399), Kamienie (1399), and Kamienne (1393).

For its initial several kilometers, the Kamienna flows parallel to the Swietokrzyskie Mountains. It also has some character of a mountain river, as the source is located at a height of approximately 360 meters above sea level, while the mouth's elevation is 130 meters. After flowing through Wąchock, the Kamienna leaves hilly areas, to enter a wide valley, which narrows before Starachowice. The Kamienna valley in the sector from Soltykow to Cmielow (74 kilometers) makes a convenient transport corridor, in which a rail line from Koluszki to Ostrowiec was built in 1885. Near Cmielow the river changes its course, turning northwards. Finally, it discharges into the Vistula, but before that, it flows for some two kilometers in the ancient stream valley of the Vistula.

Kamienna flows through the towns of Skarżysko-Kamienna, Wąchock, Starachowice, and Ostrowiec Świętokrzyski. There are four reservoirs on the river: Zalew Bliżyński, Wąchock Reservoir, Zalew Starachowice-Pasternik or Lake Starachowickie, and Zalew Brodzki or Lake Brodzkie. The valley of the Kamienna is closely associated with early years of Polish industry. Here, Old-Polish Industrial Region lies, there also is a blue-color tourist trail called Along Traces of Technological Monuments of the Kamienna River, which goes from Skarżysko-Kamienna to Ostrowiec Świętokrzyski.

First industrial facilities appeared along the Kamienna in the 15th century. In a 1547 document, a mine in Starachowice is mentioned, which excavated iron ore. Local ironworks developed in the late 16th century, and during the reign of King John III Sobieski, a blast furnace was built in Bartow on the Kamienna. Later on, other furnaces were added, at Ruda Baltowska, Cmielow, Antoniow, Aleksandrów, Stefankow.

Due to efforts of Stanislaw Staszic, the region prospered in the first half of the 19th century. Staszic designed a number of metallurgical facilities, located along the Kamienna. They all were planned to create one large enterprise, called Ironworks of the Kamienna River. According to the estimates of Stanislaw Staszic, out of 172 iron ore mines in the Old Industrial Region, 54 were located along the river. All these plans collapsed after the November Uprising.

== See also ==
- Rivers of Poland
- Geography of Poland
