= Antoni Matla =

Antoni Matla (born 8 June 1912 in Skarżysko-Kamienna, Russian Empire – 24 February 1987 in Radom, Poland) was a Polish locksmith and a member of the Sejm for four years.

Antoni Matla attended elementary school and trade school. He learned the trade of locksmith and most recently worked as a department head at the Zakłady Metalowe im. General "Waltera" (until 1951 Fabryka Broni "Łucznik") in Radom. He became a member of the Sejm during the first legislative period for the Polish United Workers' Party (PZPR) from 20 November 1952 til 20 November 1956. In the Sejm he was a member of the Commission for Trade in Goods and one of the eight deputies of the Radom district.

Matla was forced to do forced labor during the Second World War. In the 1960s, he worked for several years in Egypt. Subsequently, he was awarded the Order Odrodzenia Polski. In 1952, he was awarded the Gold Cross of Merit and in 1954, he got the Medal of the 10th Anniversary of People's Poland.
