= Mruczkowski =

Mruczkowski (feminine: Mruczkowska, plural: Mruczkowscy) is a surname of Polish language origin. It may refer to:

== People ==
- Gene Mruczkowski (born 1980), NFL American football guard
- Scott Mruczkowski (born April 5, 1982), NFL American football center
- Tomasz Mruczkowski (born June 3, 1966), Polish olympic rower
- Waldemar Mruczkowski (February 26, 1920 – February 20, 2006), pseudonym of Lucjan Wolanowski, Polish journalist, writer and traveller

== See also ==
- Mroczkowski
