= Lipowo =

Lipowo may refer to the following places:

- Lipowo, Gmina Bargłów Kościelny in Podlaskie Voivodeship (north-east Poland)
- Lipowo, Gmina Sztabin in Podlaskie Voivodeship (north-east Poland)
- Lipowo, Sejny County in Podlaskie Voivodeship (north-east Poland)
- Lipowo, Gmina Raczki in Podlaskie Voivodeship (north-east Poland)
- Lipowo, Gmina Szypliszki in Podlaskie Voivodeship (north-east Poland)
- Lipowo, Masovian Voivodeship (east-central Poland)
- Lipowo, Lubusz Voivodeship (west Poland)
- Lipowo, Giżycko County in Warmian-Masurian Voivodeship (north Poland)
- Lipowo, Kętrzyn County in Warmian-Masurian Voivodeship (north Poland)
- Lipowo, Mrągowo County in Warmian-Masurian Voivodeship (north Poland)
- Lipowo, Olsztyn County in Warmian-Masurian Voivodeship (north Poland)
- Lipowo, Ostróda County in Warmian-Masurian Voivodeship (north Poland)
