= Lipovsky =

Lipovsky Липовский
- Khutor
- Location within Volgograd Oblast Location within Russia
- Coordinates: 49°03′N 42°31′E
- Country: Russia
- Region: Volgograd Oblast
- District: Kletsky District
- Time zone: UTC+4:00

Lipovsky (Russian: Липовский) is a rural locality (a khutor) in Perelazovskoye Rural Settlement, Kletsky District, Volgograd Oblast, Russia. The population was 82 as of 2010. There are 3 streets.

== Geography ==
Lipovsky is located in steppe, on the Kurtlak River, 66 km southwest of Kletskaya (the district's administrative centre) by road. Perelazovsky is the nearest rural locality.
