= Lipowa =

Lipowa may refer to the following places in Poland:

- Lipowa, Lower Silesian Voivodeship (south-west Poland)
- Lipowa, Kuyavian-Pomeranian Voivodeship (north-central Poland)
- Lipowa, Lesser Poland Voivodeship (south Poland)
- Lipowa, Świętokrzyskie Voivodeship (south-central Poland)
- Lipowa, Silesian Voivodeship (south Poland)
- Lipowa, Brzeg County in Opole Voivodeship (south-west Poland)
- Lipowa, Nysa County in Opole Voivodeship (south-west Poland)
- Lipowa, Opole County in Opole Voivodeship (south-west Poland)
- Lipowa, Warmian-Masurian Voivodeship (north Poland)
