= Skarżysko Kościelne =

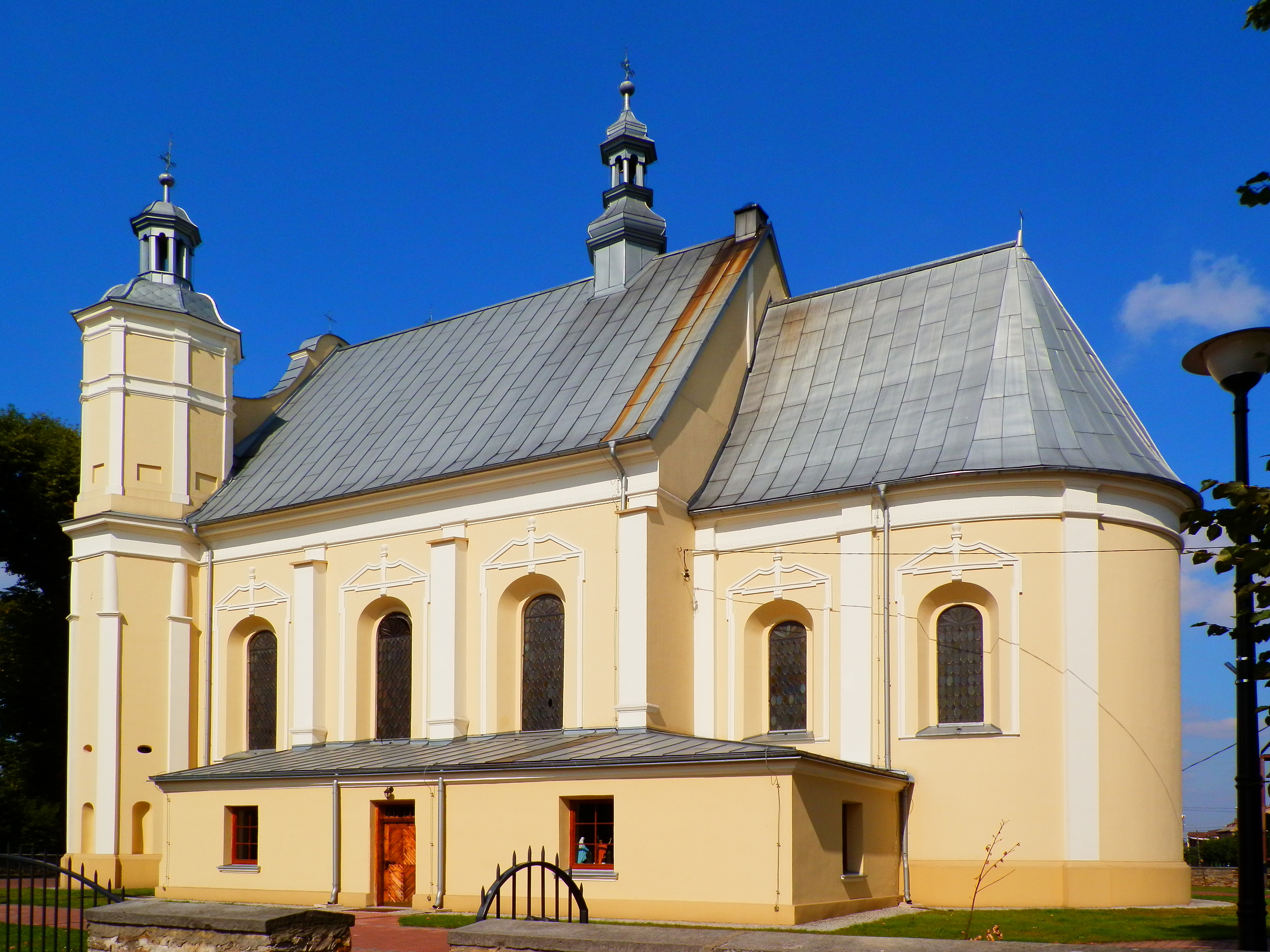
- Holy Trinity Church in Skarżysko Kościelne

- Coat of arms

- Location within Poland
- Coordinates: 51°08′15″N 20°54′51″E
- Country: Poland
- Voivodeship: Świętokrzyskie
- County: Skarżysko-Kamienna
- Gmina: Skarżysko Kościelne

Population (2006)
  - Total: 2,700
- Time zone: UTC+1 (CET)
  - Summer (DST): UTC+2 (CEST)
- Postal code: 26-115
- Area code: +48 41
- Car plates: TSK

Skarżysko Kościelne [skarˈʐɨskɔ kɔˈɕt͡ɕɛlnɛ] is a village in Skarżysko County, Świętokrzyskie Voivodeship, Poland. It is the seat of the administrative district of Gmina Skarżysko Kościelne. It lies approximately 3 km (2 mi) north of Skarżysko-Kamienna and 36 km (22 mi) north-east of the regional capital Kielce.

One of the village's landmarks is the Holy Trinity Church, erected between 1637 and 1643 (pictured).

Within the Kingdom of Poland, Skarżysko Kościelne was a private church village, administratively located in the Radom County in the Sandomierz Voivodeship in the Lesser Poland Province.
