= Bliżyn =

- Village
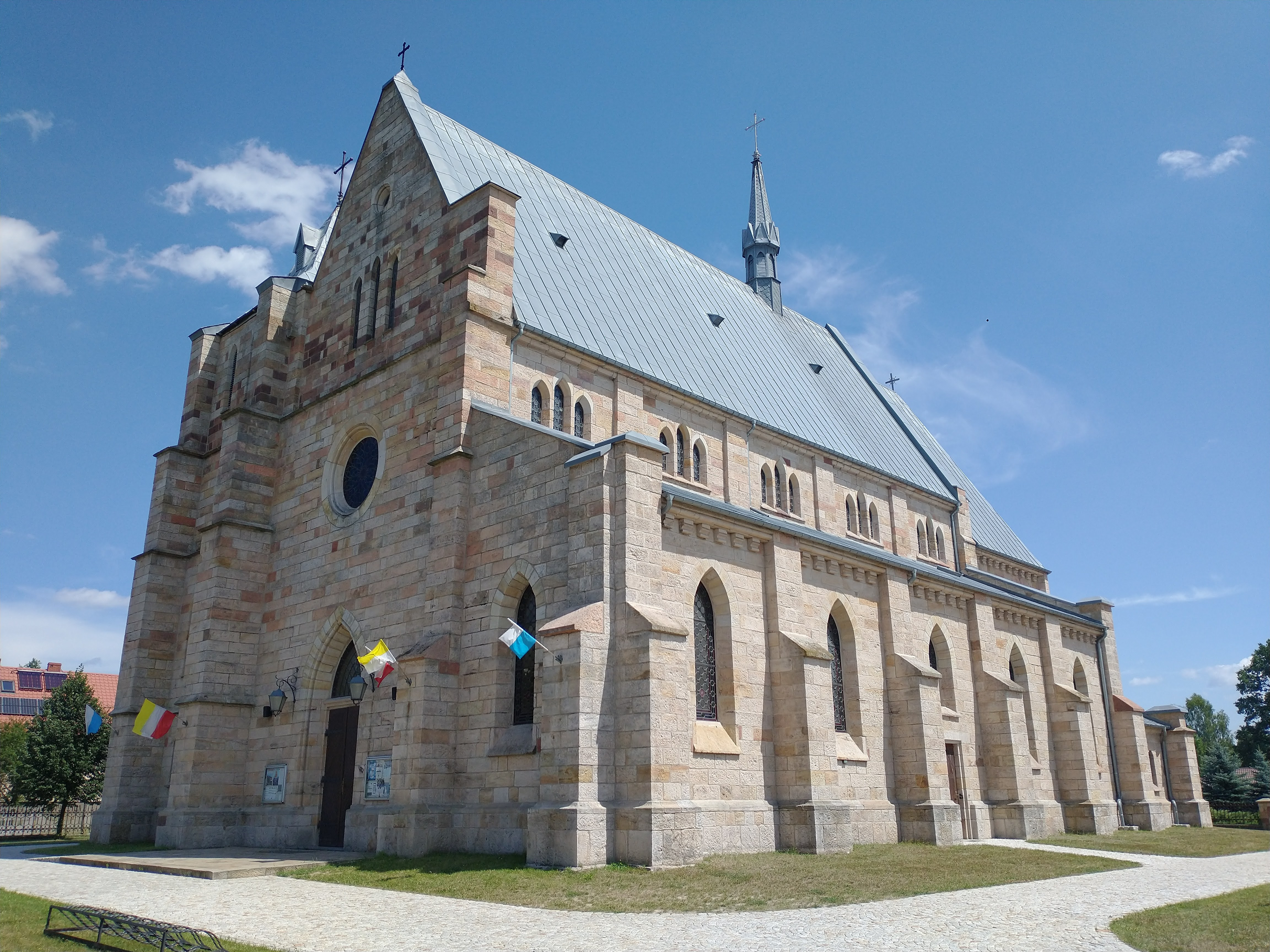
- Saint Louis church in Bliżyn

- Coat of arms

- Location within Poland
- Coordinates: 51°6′32″N 20°45′24″E
- Country: Poland
- Voivodeship: Świętokrzyskie
- County: Skarżysko
- Gmina: Bliżyn

Population
  - Total: 2,000
- Time zone: UTC+1 (CET)
  - Summer (DST): UTC+2 (CEST)
- Postal code: 26-120
- Vehicle registration: TSK

Bliżyn [ˈbliʐɨn] is a village in Skarżysko County, Świętokrzyskie Voivodeship, in south-central Poland. It is the seat of the gmina (administrative district) called Gmina Bliżyn. It lies on the Kamienna river and Bliżyn Reservoir, approximately 12 km (7 mi) west of Skarżysko-Kamienna and 27 km (17 mi) north of the regional capital Kielce.

== History ==
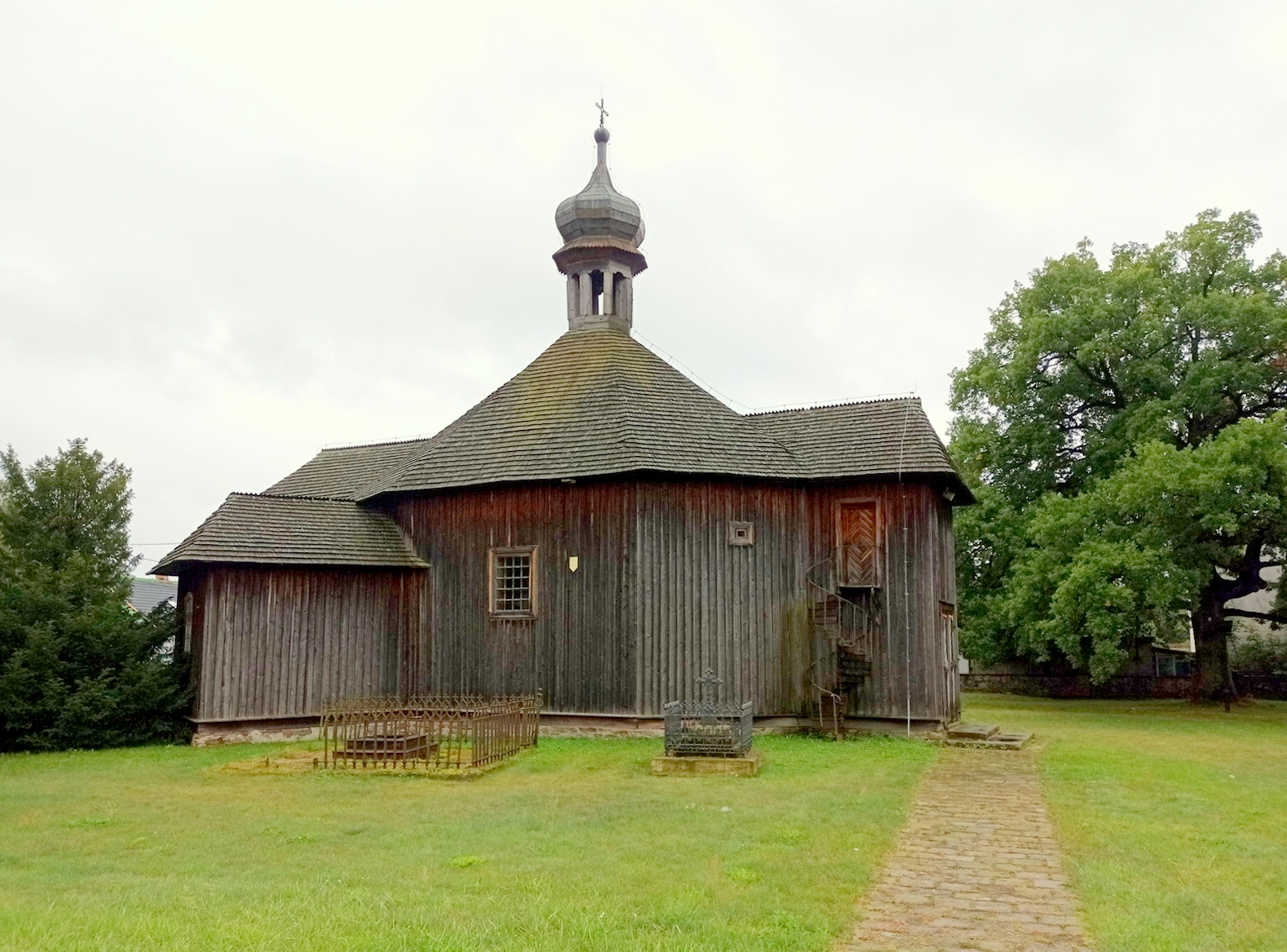
Saint Sophia chapel

The village was first mentioned in 1410, when King Władysław II Jagiełło spent a night there on his way to the battle of Grunwald. It was a private village of Polish nobility, including the Karwowski family, administratively located in the Opoczno County in the Sandomierz Voivodeship in the Lesser Poland Province.

In 19th century Stanisław Staszic founded several minor manufactories and factories there, as part of his plan of creation of the "Old Polish Industrial Area". In 1827, it had a population of 150. By the 19th century, the village had a blast furnace and a metallurgical plant. In 1875, over 357 tonnes of raw iron, over 102 tonnes of wrought iron, and over 120 tonnes of iron products and wires were produced in Bliżyn.

During World War II, the forests around Bliżyn were a German-perpetrated mass murder site of Polish intelligentsia during the so-called AB Action. The German occupiers established and operated a sizeable forced labour camp for Jews in Bliżyn.

After the war the forests were made into the Suchedniów-Oblęgorek Landscape Park. There are also two forest nature reserves: Świnia Góra and Dalejów located south of Bliżyn in Puszcza Świetokrzyska (Holy Cross Forest). There are also ruins of the 19th-century factories, a notable church and numerous remnants of dinosaurs in the rocky areas around the village.

== Sights ==
Local historic landmarks are the stone Saint Louis church, the wooden Saint Sophia chapel, and the Plater Palace, now housing the local Culture Center.

== Transport ==
There is a railway station in the village.
