= Skarżysko County =

Skarżysko County Powiat skarżyski
- County
- Flag Coat of arms

- Location within the voivodeship
- Coordinates (Skarżysko-Kamienna): 51°7′N 20°55′E
- Country: Poland
- Voivodeship: Świętokrzyskie
- Seat: Skarżysko-Kamienna
- Gminas: Total 5 (incl. 1 urban): Skarżysko-Kamienna; Gmina Bliżyn; Gmina Łączna; Gmina Skarżysko Kościelne; Gmina Suchedniów

Area
  - Total: 395.30 km^{2} (152.63 sq mi)

Population (2019)
  - Total: 74,343
  - Density: 188.07/km^{2} (487.09/sq mi)
  - Urban: 53,415
  - Rural: 20,928
- Car plates: TSK
- Website: www.skarzysko.powiat.pl

Skarżysko County (Polish: powiat skarżyski) is a unit of territorial administration and local government (powiat) in Świętokrzyskie Voivodeship, south-central Poland. It came into being on January 1, 1999, as a result of the Polish local government reforms passed in 1998. Its administrative seat and largest town is Skarżysko-Kamienna, which lies 34 kilometres (21 mi) north-east of the regional capital Kielce. The only other town in the county is Suchedniów, lying 10 km (6 mi) south-west of Skarżysko-Kamienna.

The county covers an area of 395.30 square kilometres (152.6 sq mi). As of 2019 its total population is 74,343, out of which the population of Skarżysko-Kamienna is 45,068, that of Suchedniów is 8,347, and the rural population is 20,928.

== Neighbouring counties ==
Skarżysko County is bordered by Szydłowiec County to the north, Starachowice County to the east, Kielce County to the south and Końskie County to the west.

== Administrative divisions ==
The county is subdivided into five gminas (one urban, one urban-rural and three rural). These are listed in the following table, in descending order of population.

Gmina	Type	Area (km^{2})	Population (2019)	Seat
Skarżysko-Kamienna	urban	64.2	45,068	
Gmina Suchedniów	urban-rural	74.9	10,139	Suchedniów
Gmina Bliżyn	rural	141.1	8,091	Bliżyn
Gmina Skarżysko Kościelne	rural	53.2	6,023	Skarżysko Kościelne
Gmina Łączna	rural	61.7	5,022	Łączna

== Territorial changes ==
As of 2006, Skarżysko County has undergone three territorial changes since its creation in 1999 – several villages from neighbouring counties have been incorporated:

- 2000: Pogorzałe and Książece from Szydłowiec County, until then separate villages, became districts of Skarżysko-Kamienna.
- 2001: Majków and Michałów from Starachowice County became part of Gmina Skarżysko Kościelne.
- 2004: Kierz Niedźwiedzi from Szydłowiec County became part of Gmina Skarżysko Kościelne.
