= Skarżysko-Kamienna =

City in Poland

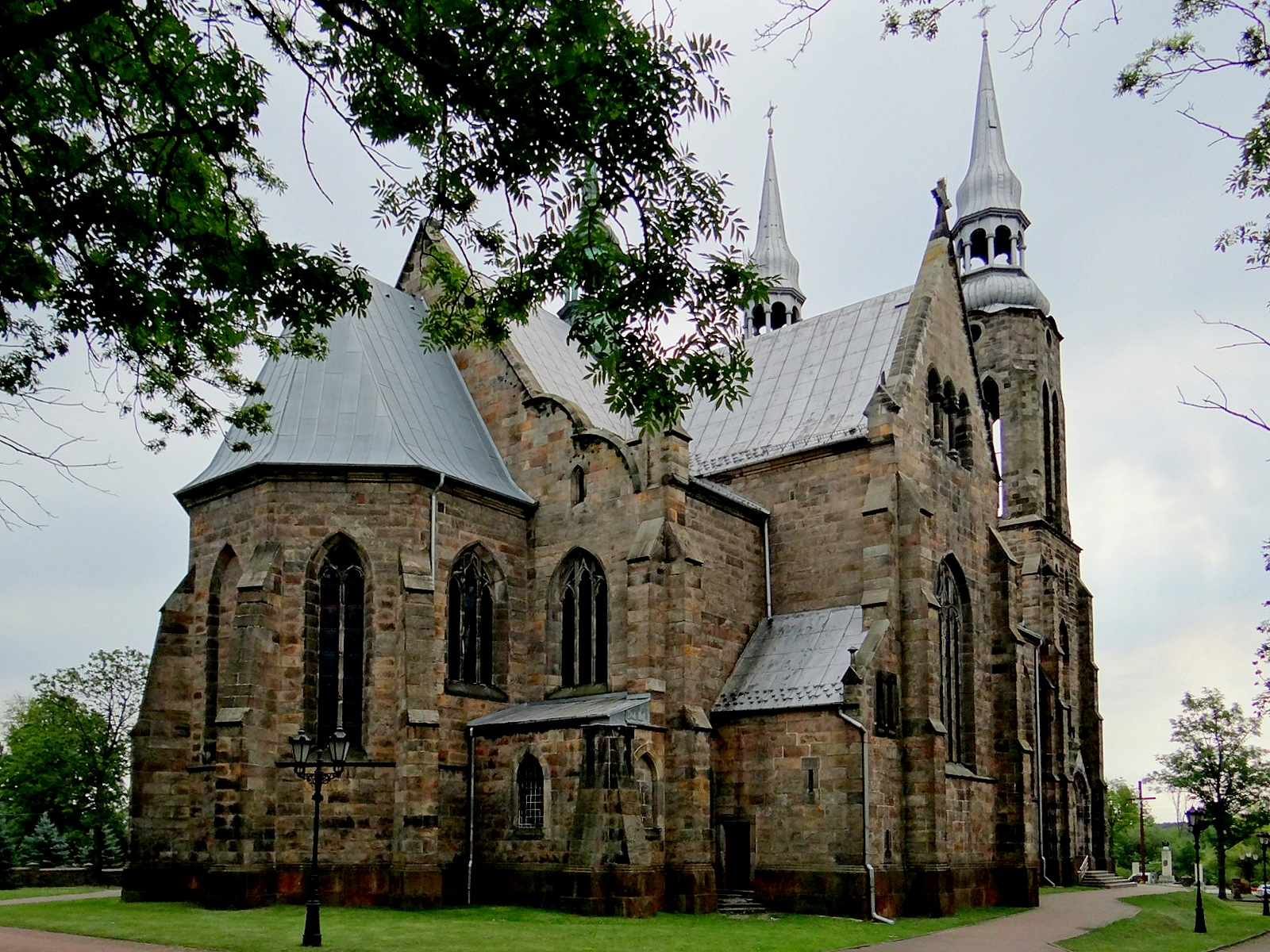
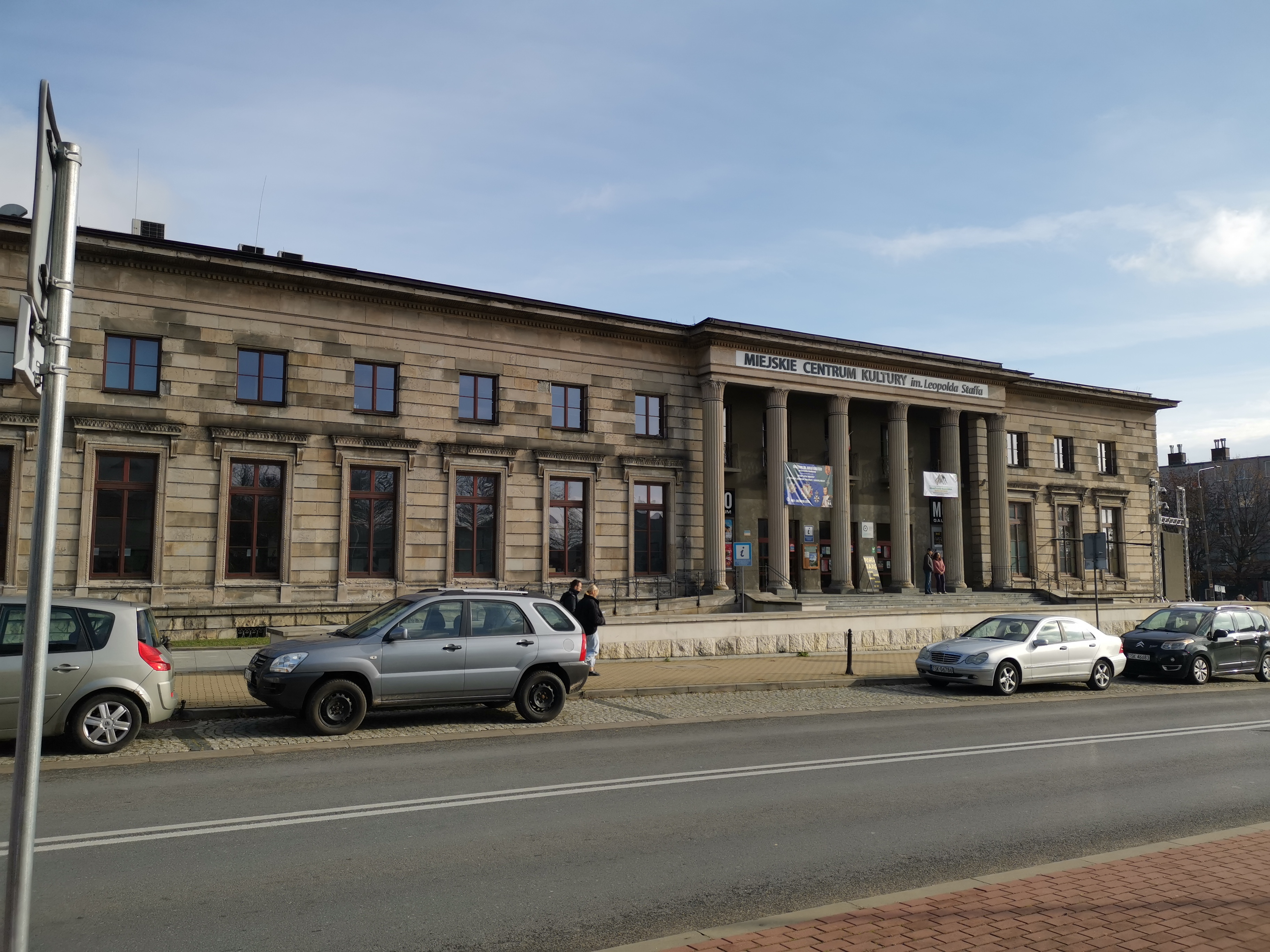
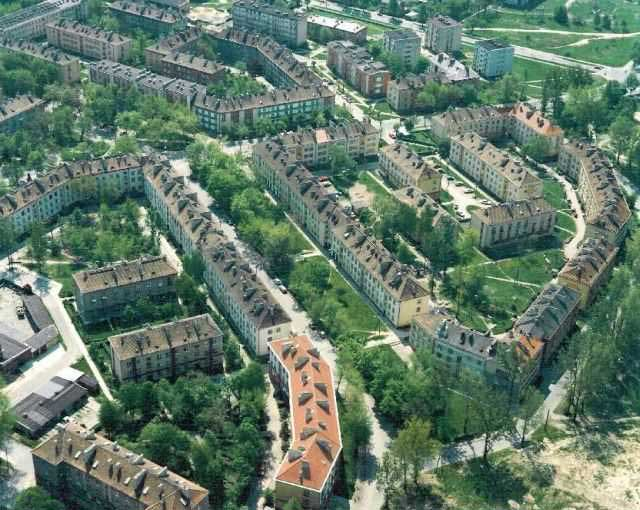
- From top, left to right: Sacred Heart of Jesus church; Municipal Culture Center; Aerial view

- Coat of arms

- Location within Poland Location within Świętokrzyskie Voivodeship
- Coordinates: 51°7′N 20°55′E
- Country: Poland
- Voivodeship: Świętokrzyskie
- County: Skarżysko
- Gmina: Skarżysko-Kamienna (urban gmina)
- City rights: 1923 as Kamienna

Government
  - City mayor: Arkadiusz Bogucki (Ind.)

Area
  - City: 64.16 km^{2} (24.77 sq mi)
- Elevation: 250 m (820 ft)

Population (2012)
  - City: 47,987
  - Density: 747.9/km^{2} (1,937/sq mi)
  - Urban: 78,636
- Time zone: UTC+1 (CET)
  - Summer (DST): UTC+2 (CEST)
- Postal code: 26-110
- Area code: +48 41
- Car plates: TSK
- Website: http://www.skarzysko.pl

Skarżysko-Kamienna (pronounced [skarˈʐɨskɔ kaˈmjɛnna]) is a city in Świętokrzyskie Voivodeship in south-central Poland by Kamienna river, to the north of Świętokrzyskie Mountains; one of the voivodship's major cities.

Skarżysko-Kamienna is an industrial city formed in 1923 from the merger of several smaller localities dating back to the medieval and early modern periods. Mining in the area dates back to 10,000 BC, whereas iron ore mining and metallurgical production date back over 550 years. Since the 19th-century industrial revolution it became an important centre of industrial production, and since 1922 it became known as one of Poland's munition production centres, nowadays also hosting a military equipment museum. During World War II, it was the site of German Nazi atrocities with over 19,000 people killed.

Prior to 1928, it bore the name of Kamienna; in less formal contexts usually only the first part of the name (Skarżysko) is used. It belongs to historic Polish region of Lesser Poland.

Skarżysko-Kamienna is an important railroad junction, with two main lines (Kraków – Warsaw and Sandomierz – Koluszki) crossing there.

== History ==
=== Prehistory ===
The present-day districts of Łyżwy and Nowy Młyn were the locations of Paleolithic industrial settlements, which are now archaeological sites, part of the Rydno Archaeological Reserve, consisting of several hundred former Paleolithic sites stretching from Skarżysko-Kamienna to Wąchock. The sites were discovered in 1923–1925.

=== Early history ===
In 1173, the knights' congress gathered in Milica village (now the town's district) led by Casimir II the Just. The oldest known mentions of the present-day districts of Bzin and Skarżysko come from 1260 and 1275, respectively. Pogorzałe was mentioned in the 15th century. Around 1440, iron ore mining begins in the present-day district of Bzin. As of the 16th century, Skarżysko, Pogorzałe and Posadaj were private villages of Polish nobility, whereas Bzin was a church possession, all administratively located in the Radom County in the Sandomierz Voivodeship in the Lesser Poland Province.

In the present-day districts of Bzin and Rejów bloomeries were established in 1700 and 1730, then replaced by blast furnaces and metallurgical plants in 1754 and 1770, respectively, and greatly upgraded in the 19th century. Until the 1880s, up to 1,638 tonnes of raw iron and 491.4 tonnes of castings were produced annually in Rejów, and up to 1,474.2 tonnes of iron were produced annually in Bzin. Iron paving stones used in Warsaw were produced in Rejów. In Kamienna, there were three metallurgical plants in the early 19th century, and local products were especially nails, until new blast furnaces were built in the 1870s. Several hundred people worked there, producing items such as pots, stoves and sewer pipes. Młodzawy had quarries.

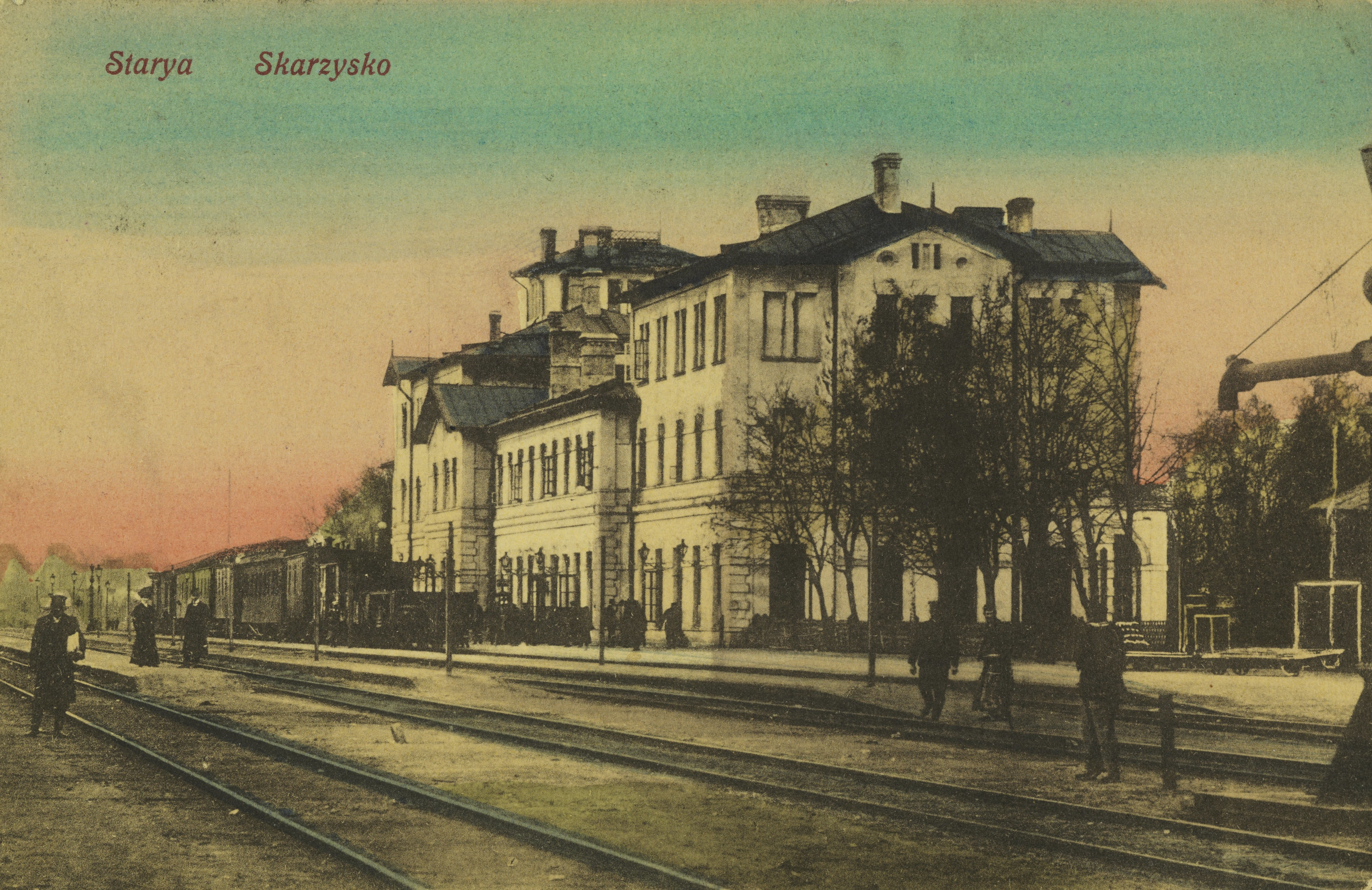
Railway station in 1909

Around 1885 Kamienna became an important rail junction on the newly built Ivangorod-Dąbrowa Railway. The main line of the railway connecting Ivangorod (Dęblin) and Dąbrowa Górnicza ran through the town from north to south, and two branch lines to Ostrowiec Świętokrzyski and Koluszki radiated from the town east and west, respectively. A passenger station, a freight station, a steam locomotive depot and railway repair facilities were built in Kamienna. Sawmills were established in Kamienna and Bzin in 1882 and 1919, respectively, and railroad ties were produced there. The rail junction spurred the growth of Kamienna from a village into a sizeable town by 1920, when it had about 20 enterprises employing 1000 workers, as well as railway workshops employing an additional 1000 workers.

During World War I, only sawmills increased their production as the Austrian occupiers conducted overlogging. On 1 November 1918, the Poles began disarming the occupying forces, mostly Czechs conscripted into the Austrian army, who surrendered their arms to the Poles without resistance. The Poles prevented the Austrians from taking away equipment and rolling stock.

=== Merger ===
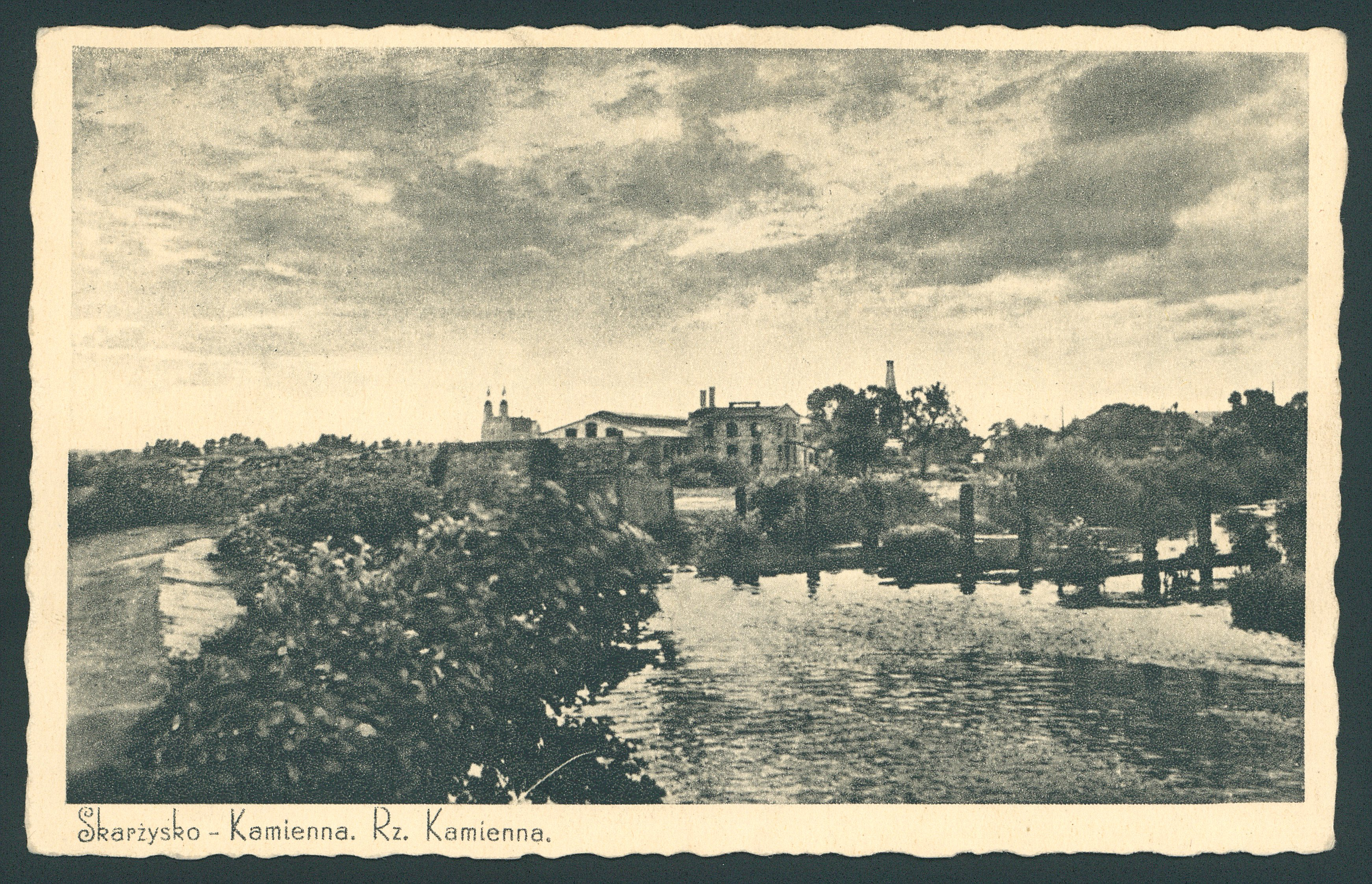
Skarżysko-Kamienna in the 1930s

In 1923, the commune of Kamienna was granted the status of a town. In 1922 the government of Poland decided to build an munitions factory in Kamienna, to be called Państwowa Wytwornia Uzbrojenia Fabryka Amunicji (P.W.U. Fabryka Amunicji, transl. National Armament Factory - Ammunition Plant) It began production in 1924 supplying munitions to the Polish Army. It employed 2760 workers in 1932, over 3000 in 1936, and over 4500 in 1939, becoming the principal employer in the town and driving its growth. The company still functions today under the name Zakłady Metalowe MESKO S.A.).

In 1928, town's name was changed to Skarżysko-Kamienna. The city had four elementary schools, three gymnasiums, a high school, and a vocational school. There were five cinemas, two printing houses, three sports clubs, an amateur theater, a professional fire department, five pharmacies, and a municipal library. In 1930, city limits were expanded by including Bzin, Młodzawy and surroundings.

In the 1930s, a technical gas factory and an enamelware factory were launched.

In 1937 the town had 19,700 inhabitants, among them 2,800 Jews (about 14% of the total).

=== German occupation of Skarżysko-Kamienna (1939–1945) ===
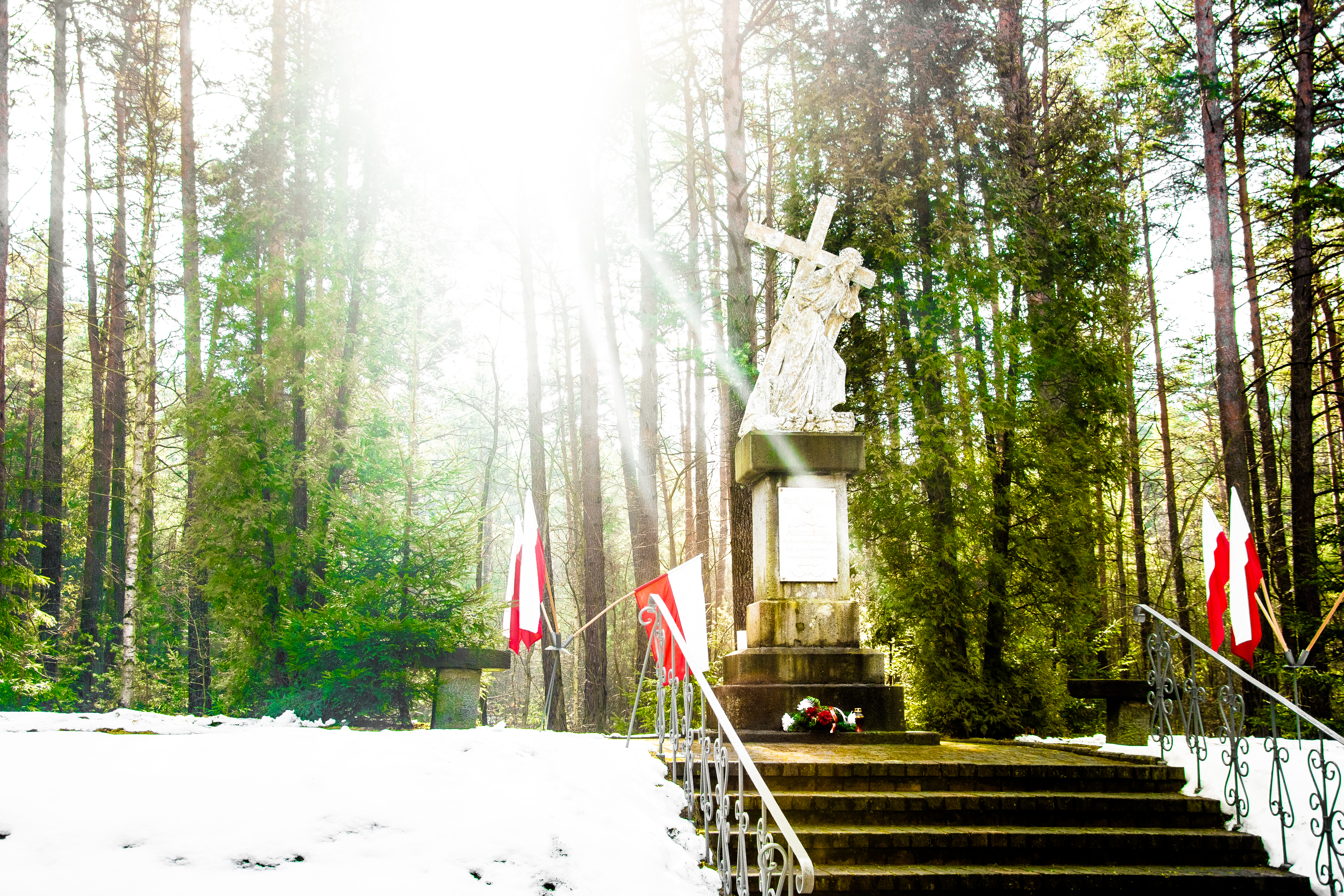
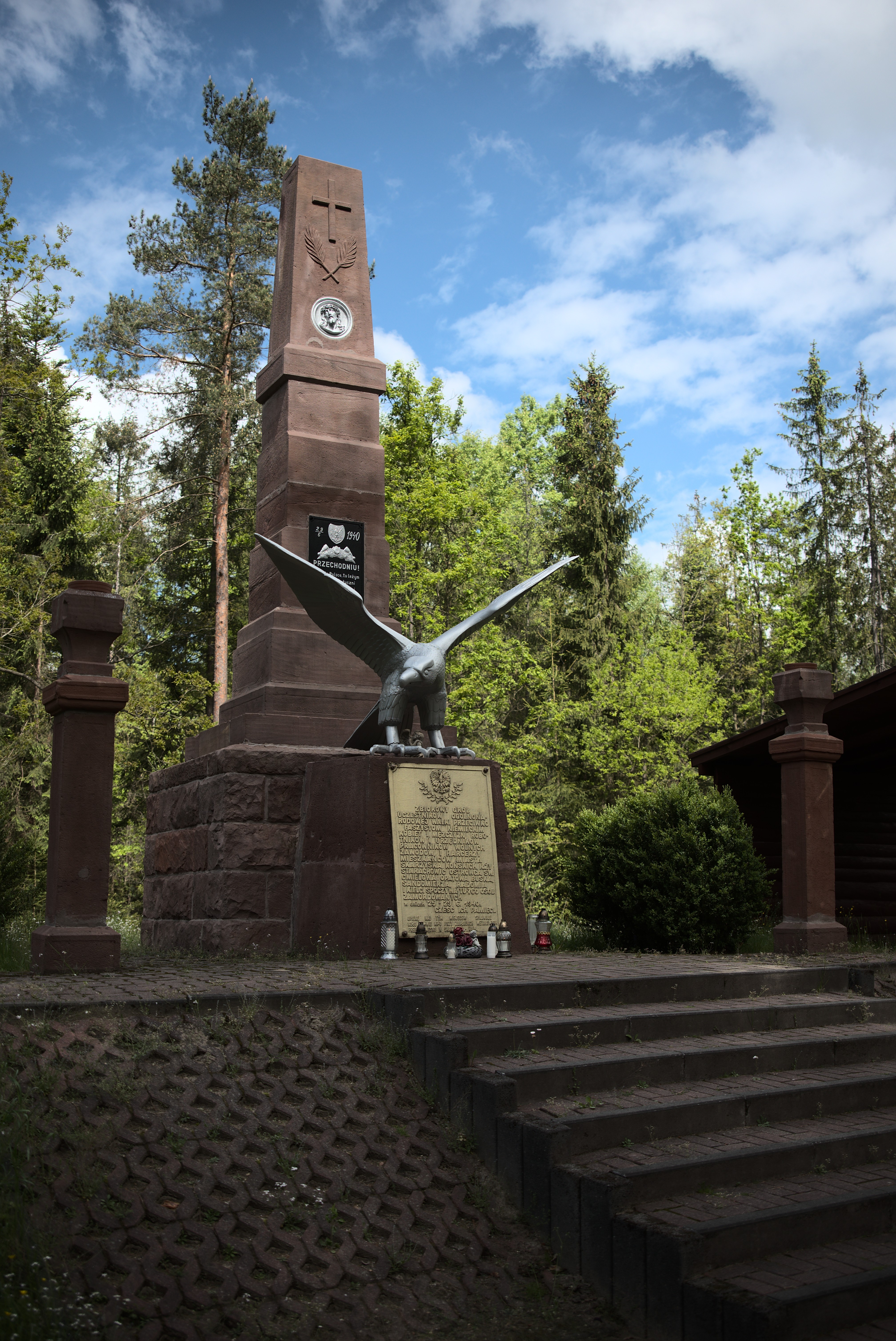
Mass graves of 1,120 Poles massacred by the Germans during the occupation in Bór and Brzask

Following the September 1939 invasion of Poland by Germany, which started World War II, Skarżysko-Kamienna was under German occupation until liberated by the Soviet army in January 1945. The Germans controlled the ammunition factory to support their own war effort, and from 1940 it was controlled by the company Hugo Schneider Aktiengesellschaft (HASAG), which ran it as a subcontractor for the Wehrmacht.

In 1940, the German occupiers carried out mass executions of Poles (360 people executed in February in Bór and 760 in June in Brzask). Over a dozen Poles from Skarżysko-Kamienna, including pre-war mayor Franciszek Tatkowski and deputy mayor Marian Maciejewski, were among the victims of massacres of Poles committed during the AB-Aktion in Firlej in 1940.

The Polish underground resistance organization Orzeł Biały (transl. White Eagle) was organized in the town. Among its members were local monks, and a weapons depot used by Polish partisans was located in the local monastery. Several monks were arrested and murdered by the Germans in the massacre committed in February 1940, while one managed to escape arrest. Polish workers carried out acts of sabotage in the factories, and those at risk of arrest fled and joined partisan units in the nearby forests.

The ghetto for the town's Jewish population was established by the Germans in April or May 1941. Between August 1942 and summer of 1943 Jews from the Radom district were brought to three camps near the munitions factory to work the factory. According to German records, of the total 17,210 brought in with 58 transports, 6,408 managed to survive long enough to be evacuated to other camps when the Germans closed the factory in 1944. The ghetto was liquidated in October 1942, with some inhabitants judged fit for work moved to the factory labour camps (about 500 out of 3000), and the rest were transported to Treblinka. In the major monograph on the subject estimated that despite the incompleteness of German records which likely underestimate the number of inmates, about 25,000 Jewish inmates were brought to the camp and 7,000 were evacuated from it; about 18,000 died there. The secret Polish Council to Aid Jews "Żegota", established by the Polish resistance movement, operated in the town. There are several known cases of Poles, who were either executed on sight or imprisoned in the local prison and deported to concentration camps for rescuing and aiding Jews.

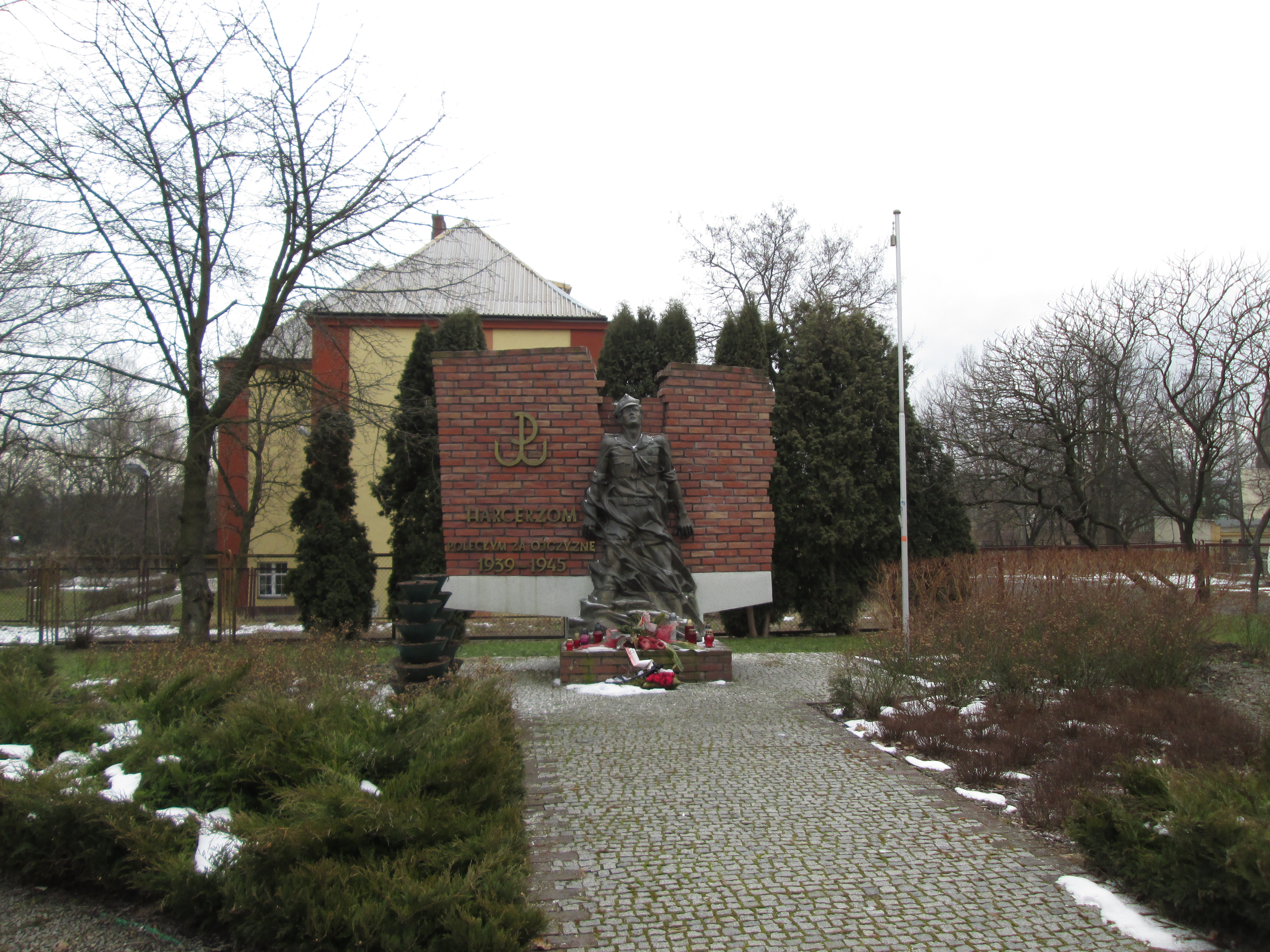
Monument to Polish Scouts killed in World War II

The German company HASAG operated a forced labour camp divided into three subcamps (A, B, C) at the munitions factory. An estimated 25,000 to 30,000 people passed through the camp and 18,000 to 23,000 prisoners died there; prisoners were mostly women. Subcamp C was the most notorious, where Jewish men and women filled shells with chemicals without protective clothing. The poisonous fumes corroded their clothes, eyes, skin and lungs, and fatal accidents at work were frequent. Women generally lasted in subcamp C for about two months. During the Eichmann trial a male survivor compared subcamp C to extermination camps.

In April 1942, the Germans founded the Stalag 380 prisoner-of-war camp, in which over 5,000 POWs were held as of August 1942. In the fall of 1942 it was relocated to Oppdal and Dombås in German-occupied Norway.

At least nine Boy Scouts and two Girl Scouts from the town were murdered by the Germans during the occupation (see Nazi crimes against the Polish nation). A monk who managed to avoid capture by the Germans in 1940, died in the Allied bombing of the town in 1945.

=== From 1945 to present ===
On 18 January 1945 the town was liberated and restored to Poland, although with a Soviet-installed communist regime, which remained in power until the Fall of Communism in the 1980s. About a dozen Jewish survivors returned to Skarżysko-Kamienna in the winter of 1945-1946 to retrieve Jewish property. Soon afterwards, in February 1946, five of them were murdered for profit by a small group of local criminals. The murderers, among them the head of the Soviet-installed town police and another communist policeman, were put on trial in Łodź. Three of them received the death penalty. The remaining Jews left Poland, except for Dr. Zundel Kahanel and his wife Bima who spent the rest of their lives in the city.

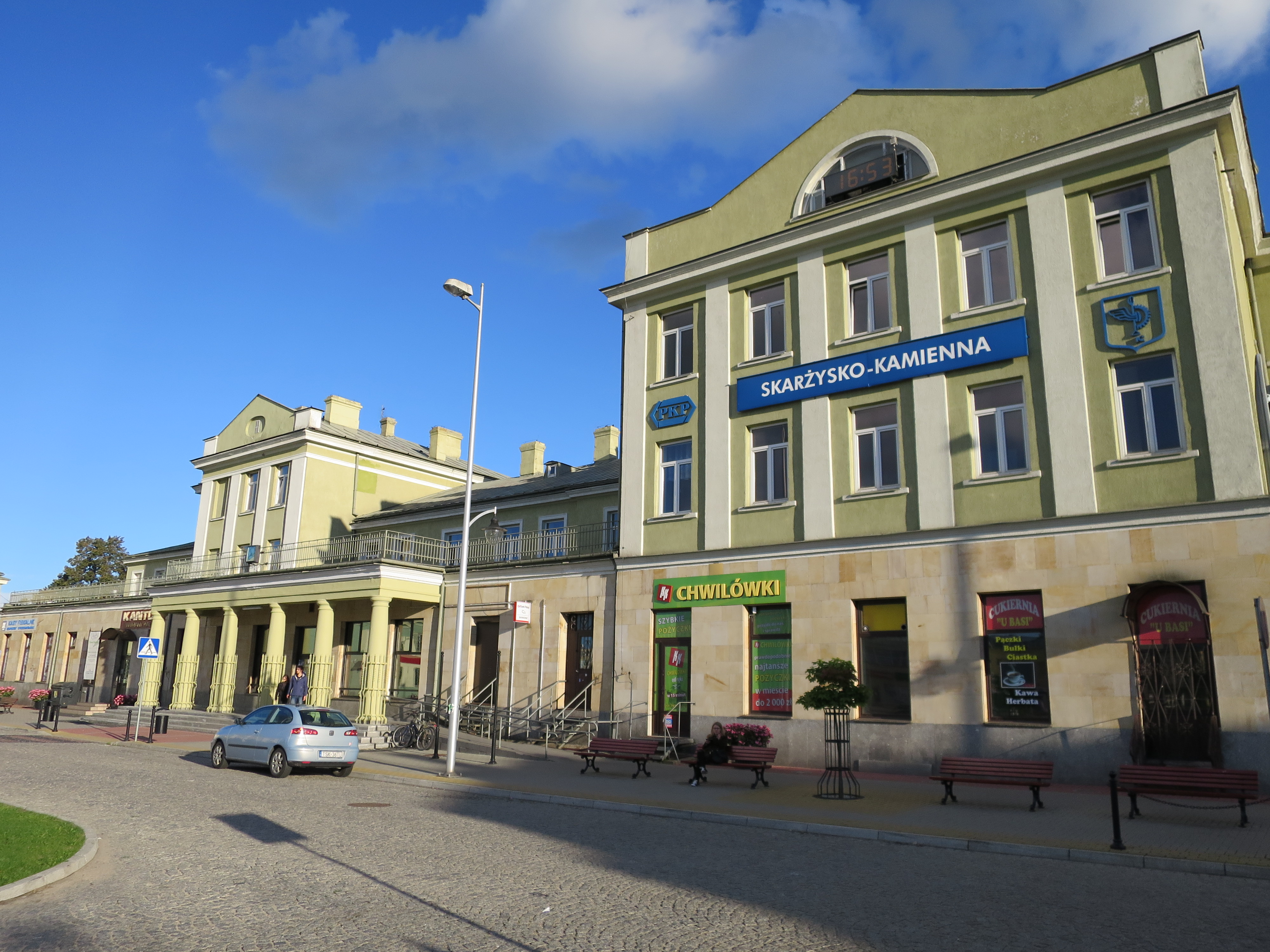
Main railway station

Meanwhile, in 1948 the leading HASAG managers were tried in Leipzig in the Soviet occupation zone in Germany. Of the 25 tried, 4 were sentenced to death, 2 to life in prison, and 18 to terms between one and five years.

In 1954, city limits were expanded by including Borki, Bzinek, Milica and Rejów as new districts. In 1969, The White Eagle Museum was established. In 1984, city limits were expanded by including the neighboring settlements of Łyżwy and Nowy Młyn as new districts. In 1999, Skarżysko County was established as a result of the Local Government Reorganization Act (1998).

== Politics and administration ==
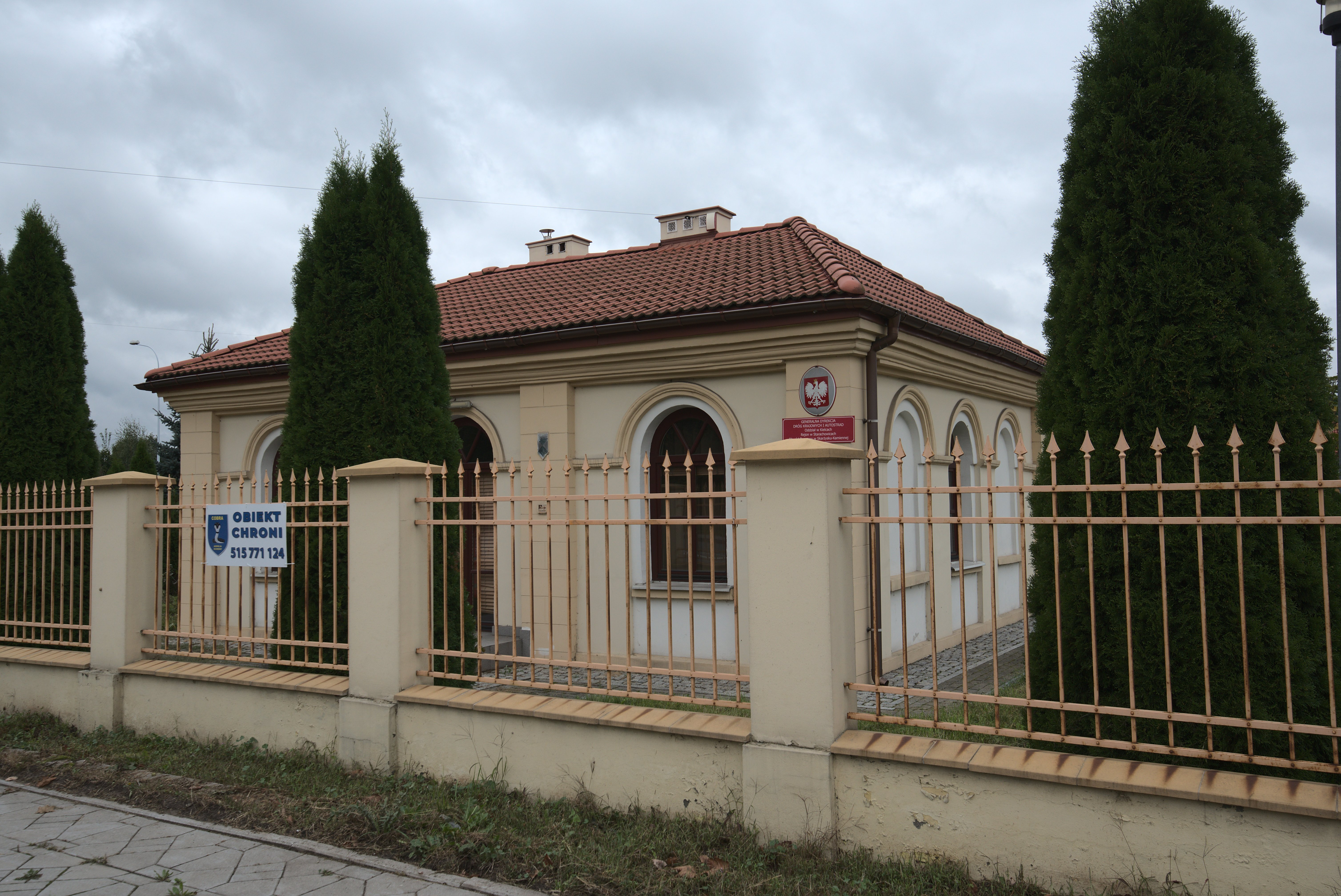
Seat of the local branch of the General Directorate for National Roads and Motorways

=== Mayors ===
- Jan Zbroja 1918
- Antoni Biernacki 1918–1923
- Tadeusz Miażdżyński 1924–1925
- Wawrzyniec Ergietowski 1925–1928
- Konstanty Bobowski ?–1934
- Franciszek Tatkowski 1934

== Points of interest ==
- The White Eagle Museum (Polish: Muzeum im. Orła Białego) - a regional museum with a large outdoor display of military equipment, most items dating back to the World War II period.
1. Indoor display – uniforms, ammunition, pistols and smaller guns, soldier equipment, photographs and documents
2. Outdoor display – one of Poland's few ships displayed onshore (torpedo boat Odważny - The Brave), planes, tanks (including one of world's few preserved Sturmgeschütz IV vehicles), helicopters, cannons, etc.
- Several scenes of Steven Spielberg's Schindler's List were filmed at MESKO.
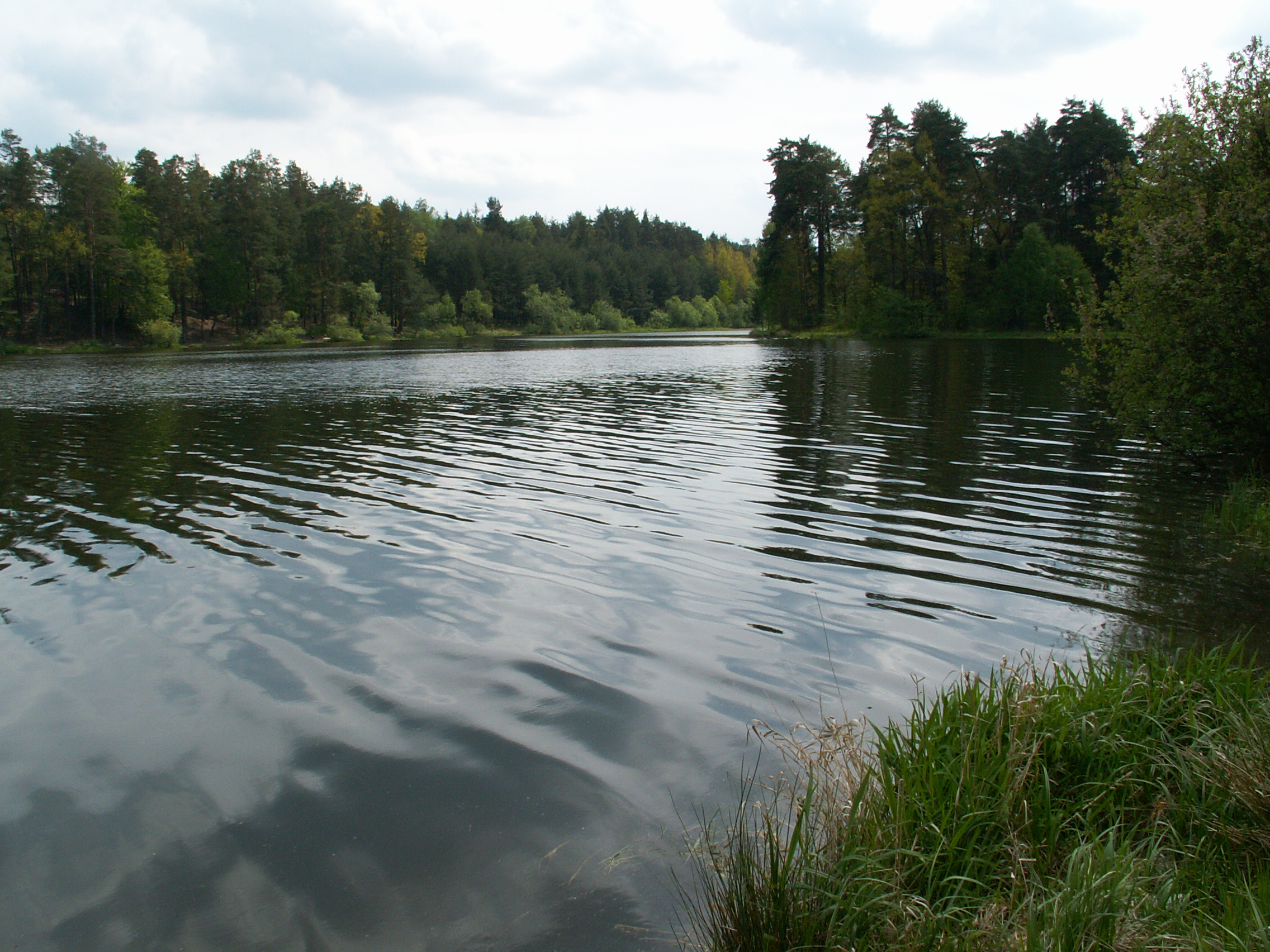
Rejów Lake

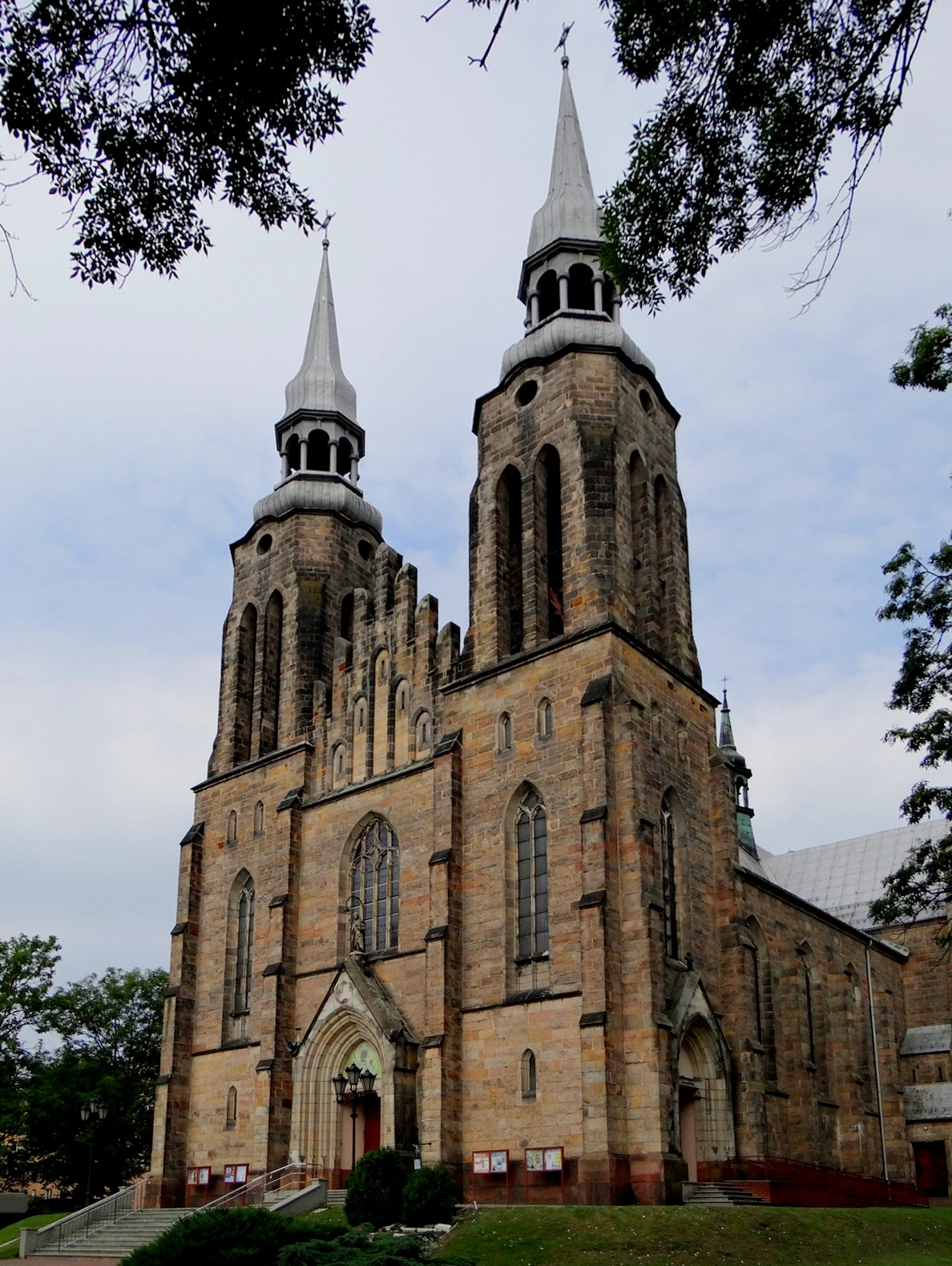
The Sacred Heart of Jesus Church

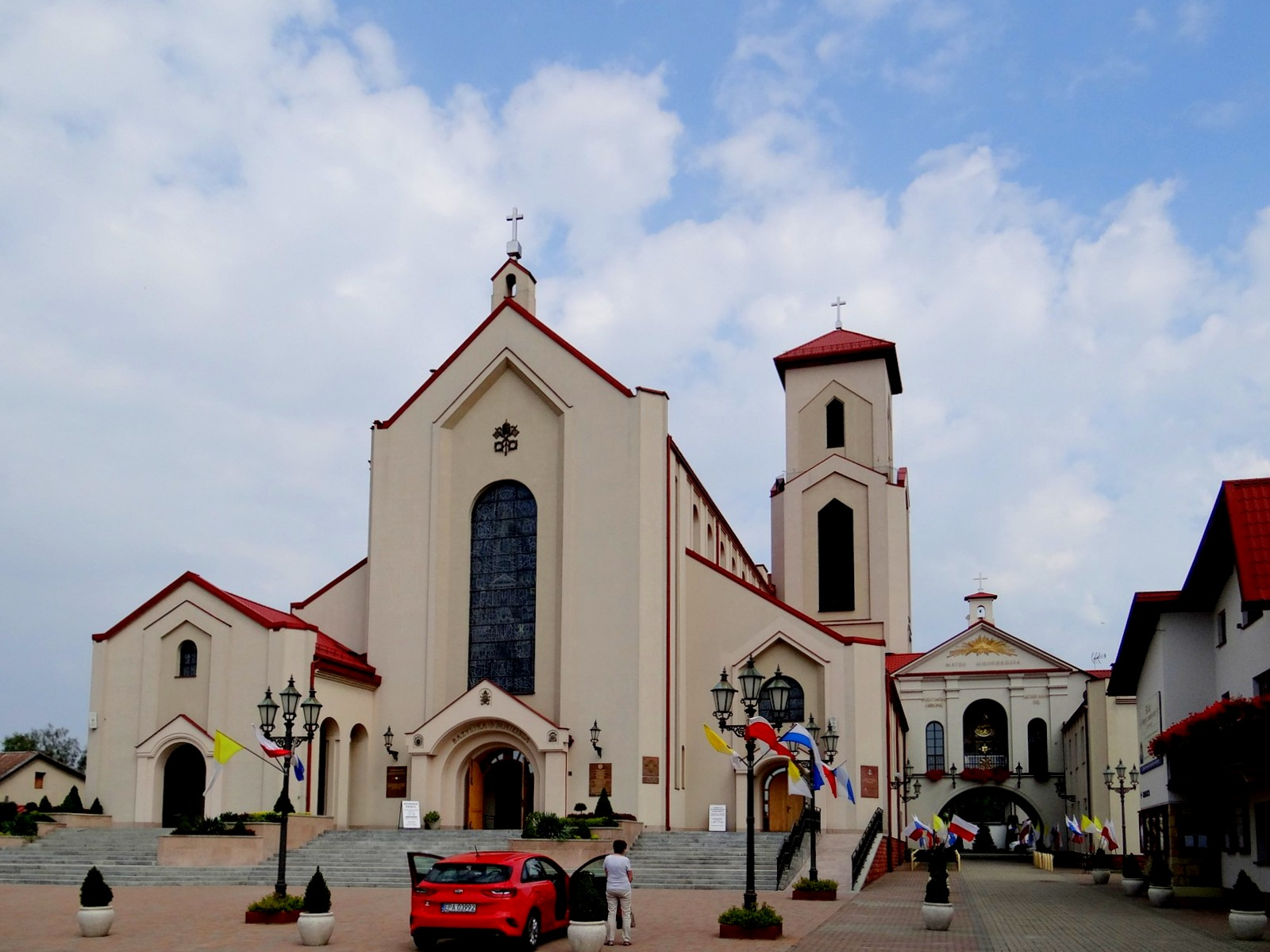
Sanctuary Our Lady of the Gate of Dawn

== Sports ==
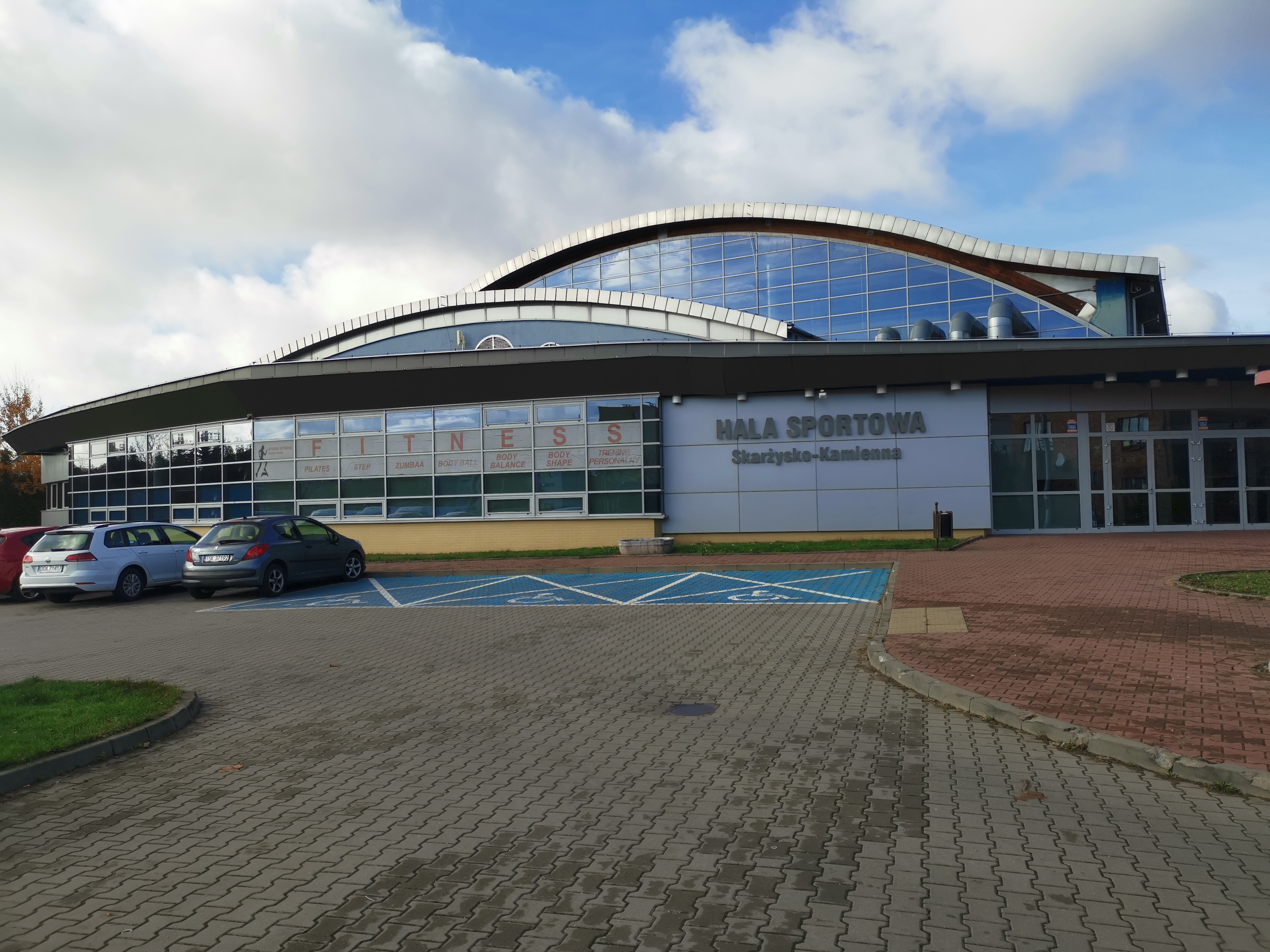
Skarżysko-Kamienna Sports Hall

The town's most notable sports clubs are football team ZKS Granat Skarżysko and volleyball team STS Skarżysko-Kamienna, which both compete in the lower leagues.

== Notable people ==
- Miłosz Kruk (born 2003), mixed martial artist
- Antoni Matla (1912–1987), Polish locksmith and politician
- Daria Pikulik (born 1997), track cyclist
- Wiktoria Pikulik (born 1998), racing cyclist
- Krzysztof Ratajski (born 1977), professional darts player
- Sylwia Spurek (born 1976), politician and lawyer
- Happysad (formed 2001), indie rock band

== International relations ==
=== Twin towns — Sister cities ===
Skarżysko-Kamienna is twinned with:

- Asenovgrad, Bulgaria
- Franklin Park, Illinois, United States
- Stafford, England
- Zhmerynka, Ukraine
