= Brodek (disambiguation) =

Brodek is a village in the administrative district of Gmina Wyśmierzyce, Białobrzegi County, Poland.

Brodek may also refer to:

- Paul Brodek, a German-Polish politician
- Brodek u Přerova, a village in the Olomouc Region
- Brodek u Prostějova, a market town (městys) in Prostějov District, Olomouc Region
- Brodek u Konice, a village and municipality (obec) in Prostějov District, Olomouc Region
- Bródek, a village in the administrative district of Gmina Łabunie, Zamość County, Lublin Voivodeship
