= Teresa Ferenc =

Polish poet (1934–2022)

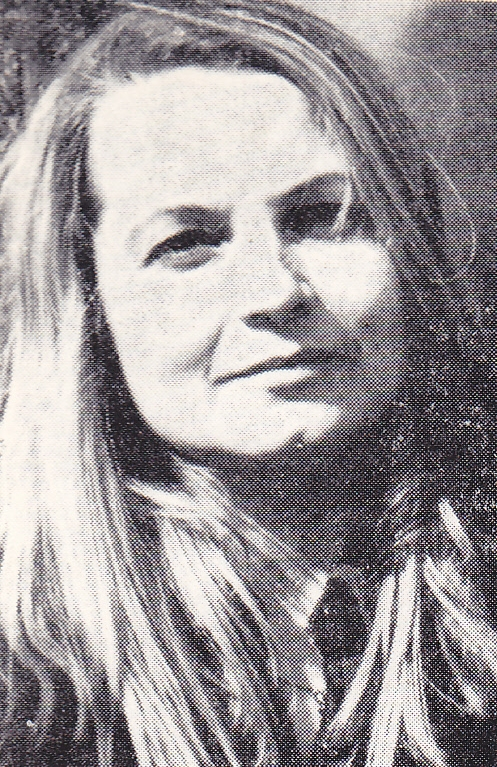
- Ferenc in 1975
- Born: 27 April 1934 Ruszów-Kolonia, Lublin Voivodeship, Poland
- Died: 1 August 2022 (aged 88)
- Occupation: Poet
- Notable awards: Medal for Merit to Culture – Gloria Artis
- Spouse: Zbigniew Jankowski

Teresa Ferenc (27 April 1934 – 1 August 2022) was a Polish poet.

== Life ==
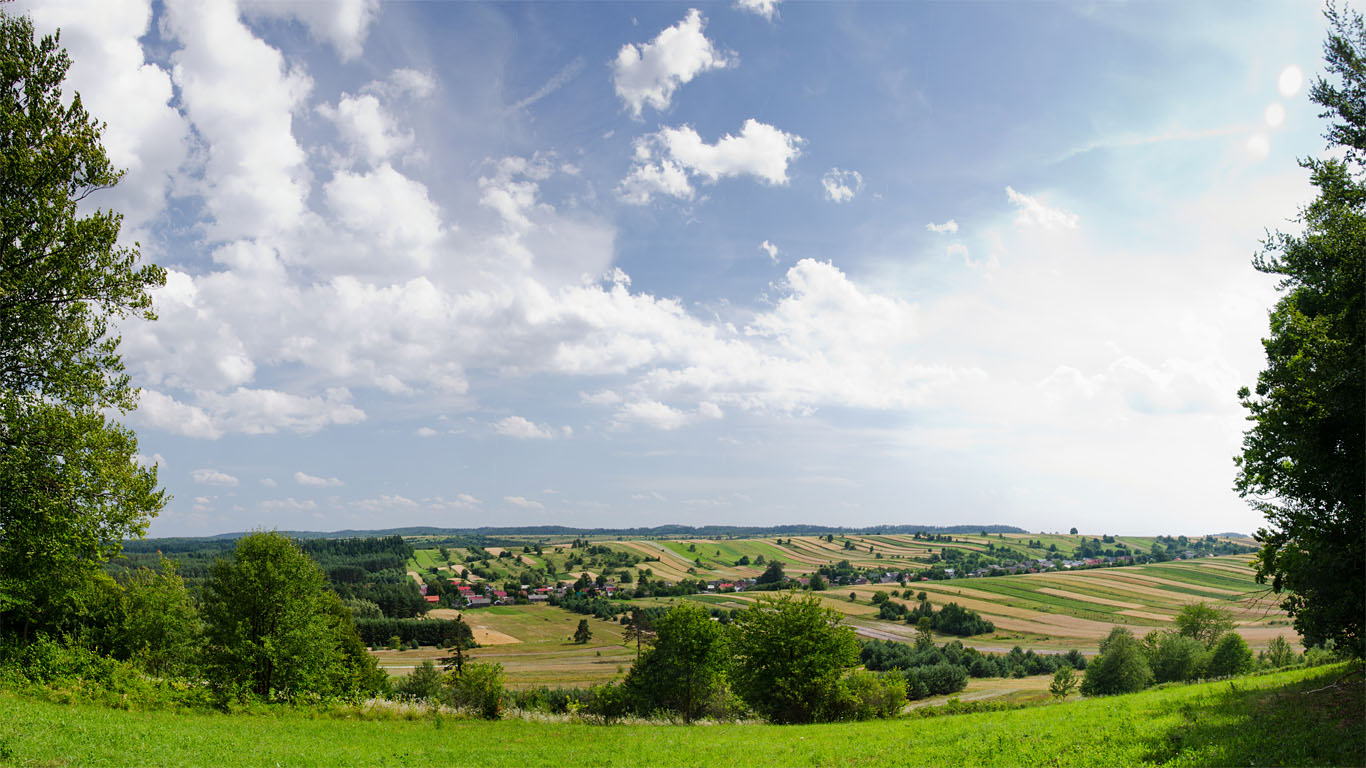
Sochy, Lublin Voivodeship, the village where Ferenc lived up to 9 years old. View from Bukowa Góra

Ferenc was born in Ruszów-Kolonia in the administrative district of Gmina Łabunie, within Zamość County in Lublin Voivodeship in Poland on 27 April 1934. She lived with her parents and family in the village of Sochy, Lublin Voivodeship in the Zamość region. During World War II, as a 9-year-old child, she survived the massacre of the village of Sochy by Nazi Germany on 1 June 1943 during German occupation of Poland. Her parents were murdered then. The village was also bombed by German Luftwaffe planes. As an orphan, she was raised by relatives and in orphanages. After graduating from Teacher's College, she taught at the Lyceum in Rybnik. In 1956 she married the poet Zbigniew Jankowski. She raised two daughters, also a poet: Anna Janko and Milena Wieczorek.

As a poet Ferenc debuted in 1958. Her first published book of poems was Moje ryżowe poletko ("My rice field") in 1964. Her works have appeared in dozens of anthologies and other collective publications in Poland and abroad. She also published books with poems for children. Together with her husband Zbigniew Jankowski, she founded the poetic group "Reda". In 2004 and 2009 she was the laureate of the President of the City of Gdańsk Award in the Field of Culture.

She was a member of the PEN Club and a founding member of the Polish Writers' Association (SPP). The poet publishes, among others in Twórczość ("Creativity"), Odra (magazine), Topos.

In 2016, Ferenc with her husband Zbigniew Jankowski was awarded the silver "Medal for Merit to Culture – Gloria Artis".

== Teresa Ferenc in film and books ==
Dramatic events in the life of Ferenc, when she survived as a 9-year-old child, the Sochy massacre by the German occupiers on 1 June 1943, in which she lost both parents – were described in a book titled Mała Zagłada ("A Little Annihilation") written by her daughter, poet Anna Janko.

The book Mała Zagłada ("A Little Annihilation") by Anna Janko became the canvas for the creation of the film Natalia Koryncka-Gruz entitled "A Minor Genocide" (Mała zagłada). The film reminds of the tragic fate of Ferenc and the inhabitants of the village of Sochy in the Zamość region, victims of the massacre. The consequences of war and war crimes in subsequent generations, families of victims of genocide are also shown.

== Selected works ==
- Moje ryżowe poletko ("My rice field") (1964),
- Zalążnia ("Ovary") (1968),
- Godność natury ("Dignity of nature") (1973),
- Ciało i płomień ("Body and flame") (1974),
- Małżeństwo ("Marriage") (1975),
- Poezje wybrane i nowe ("Selected and new poetry") (1975),
- Wypalona dolina ("Burned Valley") (1979),
- Poezje wybrane ("Selected poetry") (1980),
- Pieta ("Pietà") (1981),
- Najbliższa ojczyzna ("Nearest homeland") (1982),
- Grzeszny pacierz ("A sinful prayer") (1983).
- Drzewo dziwo ("Amazingly tree") (1987),
- Nóż za ptakiem ("Knife behind the bird") (1987),
- Kradzione w raju (1988),
- Wybór wierszy Swallowing Paradise. Poems. (1992) (in United States),
- Wiersze ("Poems") (1994),
- Boże pole ("God's field") (1997),
- Psalmy i inne wiersze dawne i nowe ("Psalms and other old and new poems") (1999),
- Dzieci wody ("Water children") (2003),
- Stara jak świat ("Old as the world") (2004),
- Ogniopis. Wybór wierszy ("Ogniopis. Selection of poems") (2009),
- Widok na życie ("A view of life") (2012)
- Wiersze. Wybor ("Poems. Choice") (2017)

== Characteristics of creativity ==
In her poetry, Ferenc touches on topics related to love, corporeality and motherhood. In her poetry she also often returns to the tragedy of her childhood – in 1943, as a nine-year-old child, she witnessed how almost all residents (including her parents) were shot by the Germans; the village itself was then bombed and burned (hence the fire motif returns in its poetry).

Ferenc wrote in the poem Wieś skamieniała (poem: "The village is petrified") about the Sochy massacre, which she survived in her childhood:
"1 June 1943 on the edge of the Zwierzyniec forests my village was shot.
Sochy – like in Oradour in France,
Sochy – like in Lidice in Czech Republic,
Sochy – like in Mezzinote in Italy."

== Selected awards and nominations ==
- 1979 – Nagroda im. Stanisława Piętaka (Gdańska Książka Roku 1979 w dziedzinie poezji) za tom poezji Wypalona dolina ("The prize Stanisław Piętak ( Gdańsk Book of the Year 1979 in the field of poetry) for the poetry volume "Burned Valley"")
- 1997 – wyróżnienie przyznane przez Fundację Kultury za Boże pole ("distinction awarded by the Culture Foundation for "God's field"")
- 1997 – nagroda Media Książce (Gdańska Książka Wiosny) za Boże pole ("Media Book award (Gdańsk Spring Book) for "God's field"")
- 2004 – Nagroda Artusa 2004 za zbiór Stara jak świat (""Artus Award 2004" for the collection "Old as the World"")
- 2004 – nagroda Media Książce za rok 2004, za zbiór Stara jak świat (""Media Book" award for 2004, for the collection "Old as the World"")
- 2013 – finał Nagrody Poetyckiej Orfeusz za tom Widok na życie (final of the Orpheus Poetry Award for the volume A view of life)
- 2016 – silver Medal for Merit to Culture – Gloria Artis

== Bibliography ==
- "Polska Bibliografia Literacka. Ferenc Teresa" [Polish Literary Bibliography. Ferenc Teresa] (in Polish).
- "Rzeź w Sochach: ... i rozstrzelali ich wszystkich" [Slaughter in Sochy: ... and they shot them all] (in Polish). 15 April 2014.

== See also ==
- Anna Janko
- Zbigniew Jankowski
- Sochy massacre
- Ethnic cleansing of Zamojszczyzna by Nazi Germany
- Pacification actions in German-occupied Poland
- List of Polish-language authors
- List of Polish-language poets
- List of Poles
- Zamość
- Zwierzyniec
