= Zbigniew Jankowski =

Polish poet (1931–2024)

- Born: 26 December 1931; Bydgoszcz, Poland
- Died: 6 July 2024 (aged 92)
- Occupation: Poet
- Spouse: Teresa Ferenc

Zbigniew Jankowski (26 December 1931 – 6 July 2024) was a Polish poet, writer, essayist, literary critic.

== Life and career ==
Zbigniew Jankowski was born in Bydgoszcz, in Kuyavian-Pomeranian Voivodeship, Poland on 26 December 1931. He made his debut as a poet in 1956. He was the organizer and the first president of the Literary Club "Kontakty" in Rybnik, the creator of the poetic and artistic group "Reda" in Kołobrzeg, the organizer and president of the Lower Silesian Branch of the Association of Polish Mariners, animator Of the Academic Literary Circle formed at Basilica of St. St. Nicholas in Gdańsk. Member PEN Club, founding member Stowarzyszenie Pisarzy Polskich, ("Association of Polish Writers"). From 1975 he lived in Sopot. Three times nominated for Orpheus - Poetic Award of K.I. Gałczyński. Poet's husband Teresa Ferenc, father of the poet Anna Janko.

In 2016, Zbigniew Jankowski was awarded the silver "Medal for Merit to Culture – Gloria Artis".

Zbigniew Jankowski's work has been translated into English, German, Russian, Swedish, Greek, French, Czech, Serbian

Jankowski died on 6 July 2024, at the age of 92.

== Selected works ==
- Dotyk popiołu. Miniatury liryczne (1959) ("A touch of ash. Lyrical miniatures")
- Żar. Poemat (1966) ("Heat. Poem")
- Ciążenie morza (1970) ("Gravity of the sea")
- Psałterz bałtycki. Wiersze wybrane i nowe (1974) ("Baltic Psalter. Selected and new poems")
- Kto żyje (1980) ("Who is alive")
- Zanurzenie. Modlitwy poetyckie (1980, 1981) ("Dipping. Poetic Prayers")
- Żegluga. Poemat (1983) ("Shipping. Poem")
- Pełne morze. Wybór wierszy (1987) ("High sea. Selection of poems")
- Spokojnie, wodo (1991) ("Relax, water")
- Cztery twarze domu. Antologia rodzinna (1991) - wspólnie z Teresa Ferenc, Anna Janko i Mileną Wieczorek (""Four Faces of the House. Family Anthology" (1991) - together with Teresa Ferenc, Anna Janko and Milena Wieczorek")
- Port macierzysty (1995) ("Home port")
- Morze przybywa z daleka. Modlitwy i inne wiersze (1997) ("The sea comes from afar. Prayers and other poems")
- Powiedz, Rabbi (1999) ("Say, Rabbi")
- Słowo ostatnie i wciąż pierwsze. Wiersze wybrane i nowe (2000) ("The last word and still the first. Selected and new poems")
- Wielkie tło. Wiersze nowe 1999-2001 (2001) ("Great background. New poems 1999-2001")
- Ciernie wody (2003) ("Water thorns")
- Odpływ. Sztuka ubywania (2005) ("Outflow. The art of declining")
- Biały delfin. Nowy wybór wierszy (2009) ("White dolphin. New selection of poems")
- Zaraz przyjdzie (2011) ("Coming soon")
- Biała przędza (2014) ("White yarn")

== Selected awards and nominations ==
- 1979 – Gdańska Książka Roku 1978 za tom Żywioł wszelki. Wiersze wybrane i nowe ("1978 Gdańsk Book of the Year for the volume "All element. Selected and new poems"")
- 2012 – nominacja do Nagrody Poetyckiej "Orfeusz" za tom Zaraz przyjdzie ("nomination for the "Orpheus" Poetic Award for the volume "Coming soon"")
- 2015 – finał Nagrody Poetyckiej Orfeusz za tom Biała przędza ("final of the "Orpheus" Poetic Award for the volume "White yarn"")
- 2016 – silver Medal for Merit to Culture – Gloria Artis
- 2017 – nominacja do Nagrody Poetyckiej Orfeusz za tom Wolne miejsce ("nomination for the "Orpheus" Poetic Award for the volume "Free Place"")

== See also ==
- Anna Janko
- Teresa Ferenc
- Sochy massacre
- List of Polish-language authors
- List of Polish-language poets
- List of Poles
