= Łabuńki Drugie =

- Village
- Location within Poland
- Coordinates: 50°42′16″N 23°21′26″E
- Country: Poland
- Voivodeship: Lublin
- County: Zamość
- Gmina: Łabunie

Łabuńki Drugie [waˈbuɲki ˈdruɡʲɛ] is a village in the administrative district of Gmina Łabunie within Zamość County, Lublin Voivodeship in eastern Poland.
