= Wólka Łabuńska =

- Village
- Location within Poland
- Coordinates: 50°38′N 23°23′E
- Country: Poland
- Voivodeship: Lublin
- County: Zamość
- Gmina: Łabunie

Wólka Łabuńska [ˈvulka waˈbuɲska] is a village in the administrative district of Gmina Łabunie, within Zamość County, Lublin Voivodeship, in eastern Poland.
