= Mocówka =

- Village
- Location within Poland
- Coordinates: 50°41′42″N 23°21′52″E
- Country: Poland
- Voivodeship: Lublin
- County: Zamość
- Gmina: Łabunie

Mocówka [mɔˈt͡sufka] is a village in the administrative district of Gmina Łabunie, within Zamość County, Lublin Voivodeship, in eastern Poland.
