= Sochy, Lublin Voivodeship =

Sochy
- Village
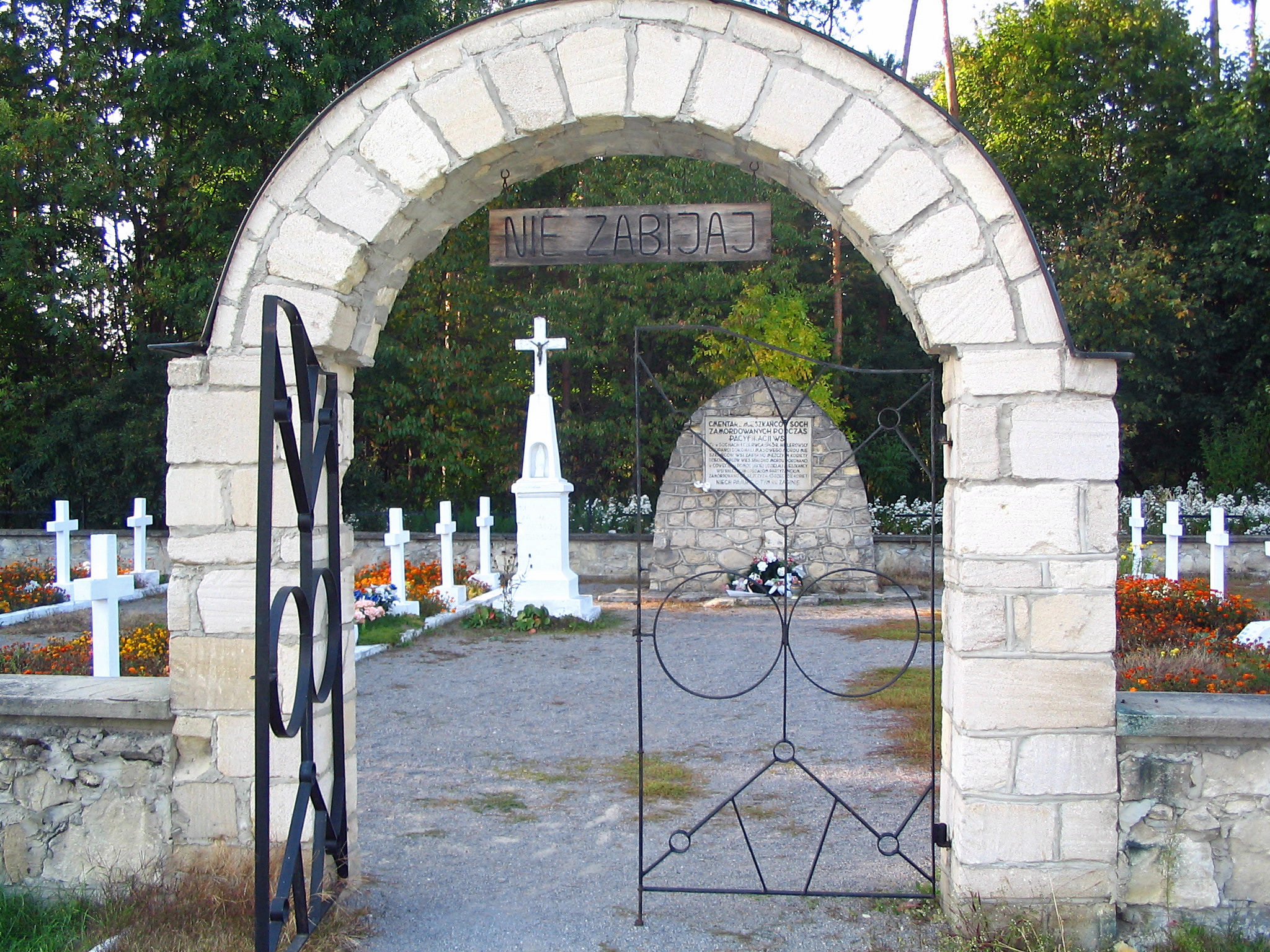
- The cemetery of Nazi victims

- Location within Poland
- Coordinates: 50°35′00″N 22°56′57″E
- Country: Poland
- Voivodeship: Lublin
- County: Zamość
- Gmina: Zwierzyniec

Sochy [ˈsɔxɨ] is a village in the administrative district of Gmina Zwierzyniec located within Zamość County, Lublin Voivodeship.

== History ==
During the Sochy massacre, Germans murdered about 200 people. It happened in June 1943 during the Germanisation of the region, which caused the Zamość Uprising. Polish writer Anna Janko is a daughter of one of survivors, she describes the tragedy in her book Mała Zagłada.
