= Dąbrowa, Zamość County =

Dąbrowa
- Village
- Location within Poland
- Coordinates: 50°36′N 23°25′E
- Country: Poland
- Voivodeship: Lublin
- County: Zamość
- Gmina: Łabunie

Dąbrowa [dɔmˈbrɔva] is a village in the administrative district of Gmina Łabunie, within Zamość County, Lublin Voivodeship, in eastern Poland.
