= Wierzbie, Lublin Voivodeship =

Wierzbie
- Village
- Location within Poland
- Coordinates: 50°40′N 23°20′E
- Country: Poland
- Voivodeship: Lublin
- County: Zamość
- Gmina: Łabunie

Population
  - Total: 450
- Time zone: UTC+1 (CET)
  - Summer (DST): UTC+2 (CEST)
- Vehicle registration: LZA

Wierzbie [ˈvjɛʐbjɛ] is a village in the administrative district of Gmina Łabunie, within Zamość County, Lublin Voivodeship, in eastern Poland.

== History ==
In 1827, the village had a population of 183.

During the German occupation of Poland in World War II, on 4 January 1943, the German gendarmerie and Ukrainian nationalists committed a massacre of 30 Poles in Wierzbie (21 men, 3 women and 6 children).
