= Majdan Ruszowski =

- Village
- Location within Poland
- Coordinates: 50°37′3″N 23°17′43″E
- Country: Poland
- Voivodeship: Lublin
- County: Zamość
- Gmina: Łabunie
- Population: 380

Majdan Ruszowski (Polish pronunciation: [ˈmajdan ruˈʂɔfskʲi]) is a village in the administrative district of Gmina Łabunie, within Zamość County, Lublin Voivodeship, in eastern Poland.
