= Ruszów, Lublin Voivodeship =

Ruszów
- Village
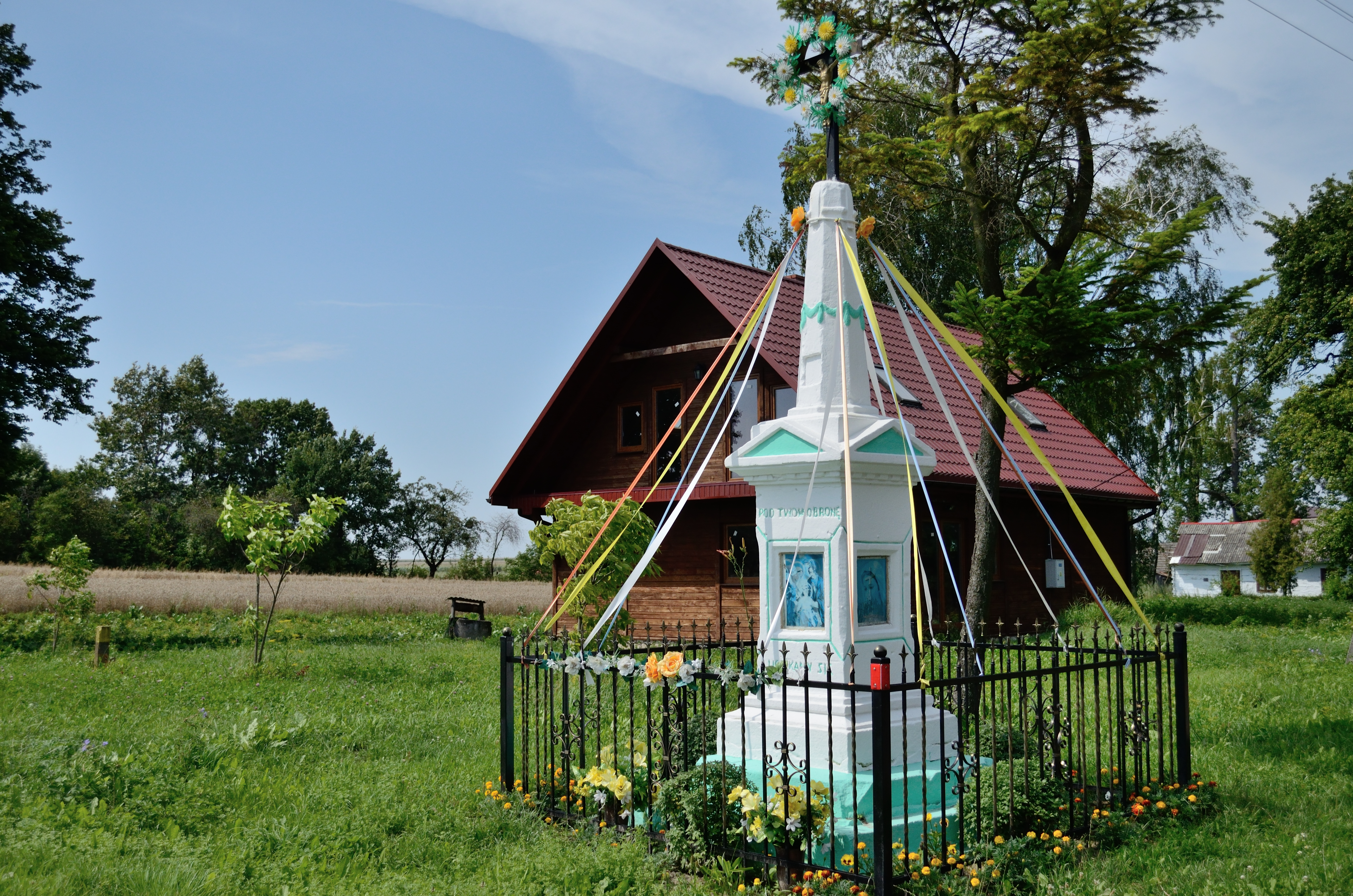

- Location within Poland
- Coordinates: 50°40′N 23°20′E
- Country: Poland
- Voivodeship: Lublin
- County: Zamość
- Gmina: Łabunie

Population
  - Total: 543
- Time zone: UTC+1 (CET)
  - Summer (DST): UTC+2 (CEST)

Ruszów [ˈruʂuf] is a village in the administrative district of Gmina Łabunie, within Zamość County, Lublin Voivodeship, in eastern Poland.

== History ==
Six Polish citizens were murdered by Nazi Germany in the village during World War II.
