= Łabunie-Reforma =

- Village
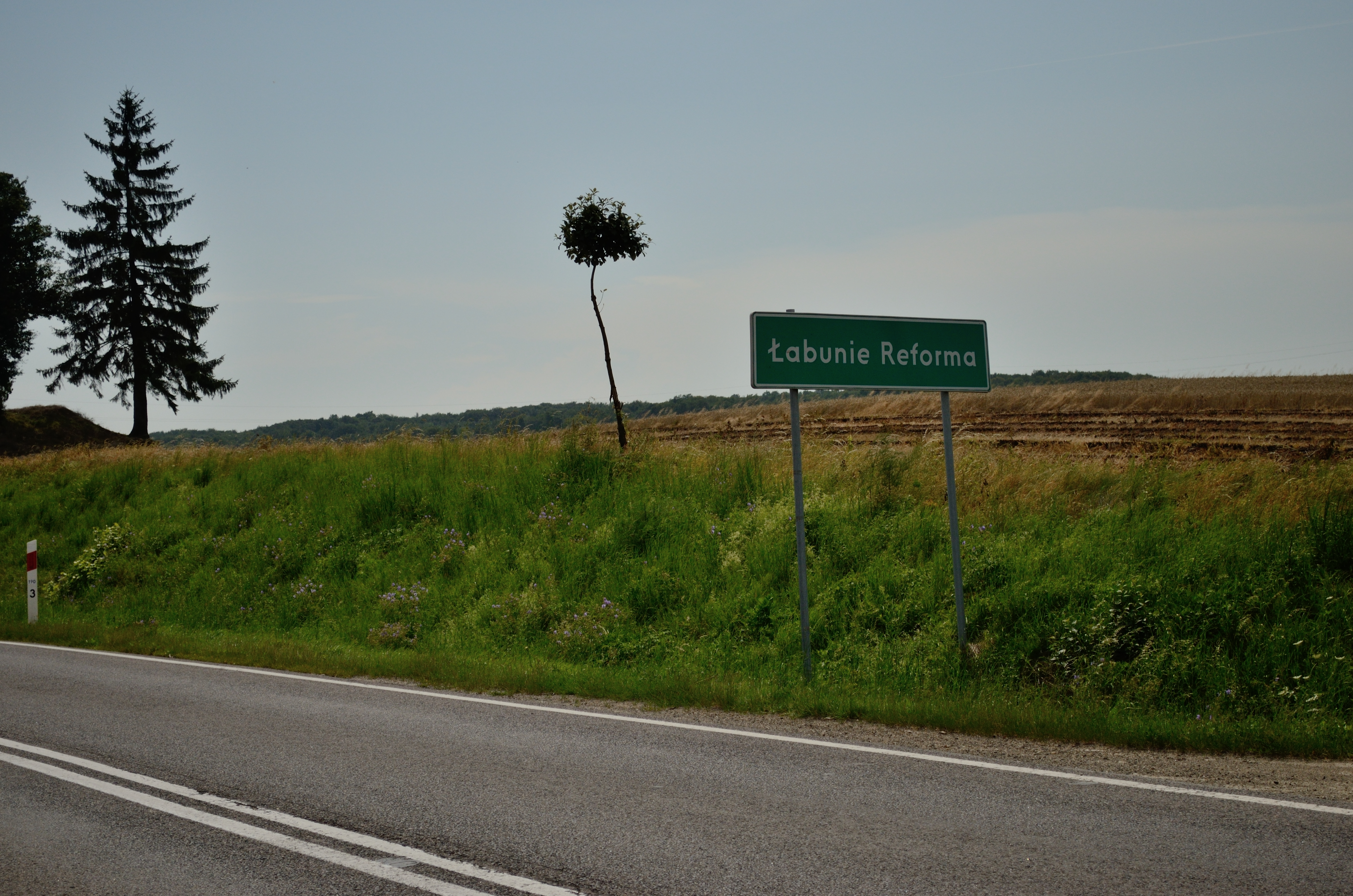

- Location within Poland
- Coordinates: 50°37′44″N 23°20′58″E
- Country: Poland
- Voivodeship: Lublin
- County: Zamość
- Gmina: Łabunie

Łabunie-Reforma [waˈbuɲɛ rɛˈfɔrma] is a village in the administrative district of Gmina Łabunie, within Zamość County, Lublin Voivodeship, in eastern Poland.
