= Łabunie =

- Village
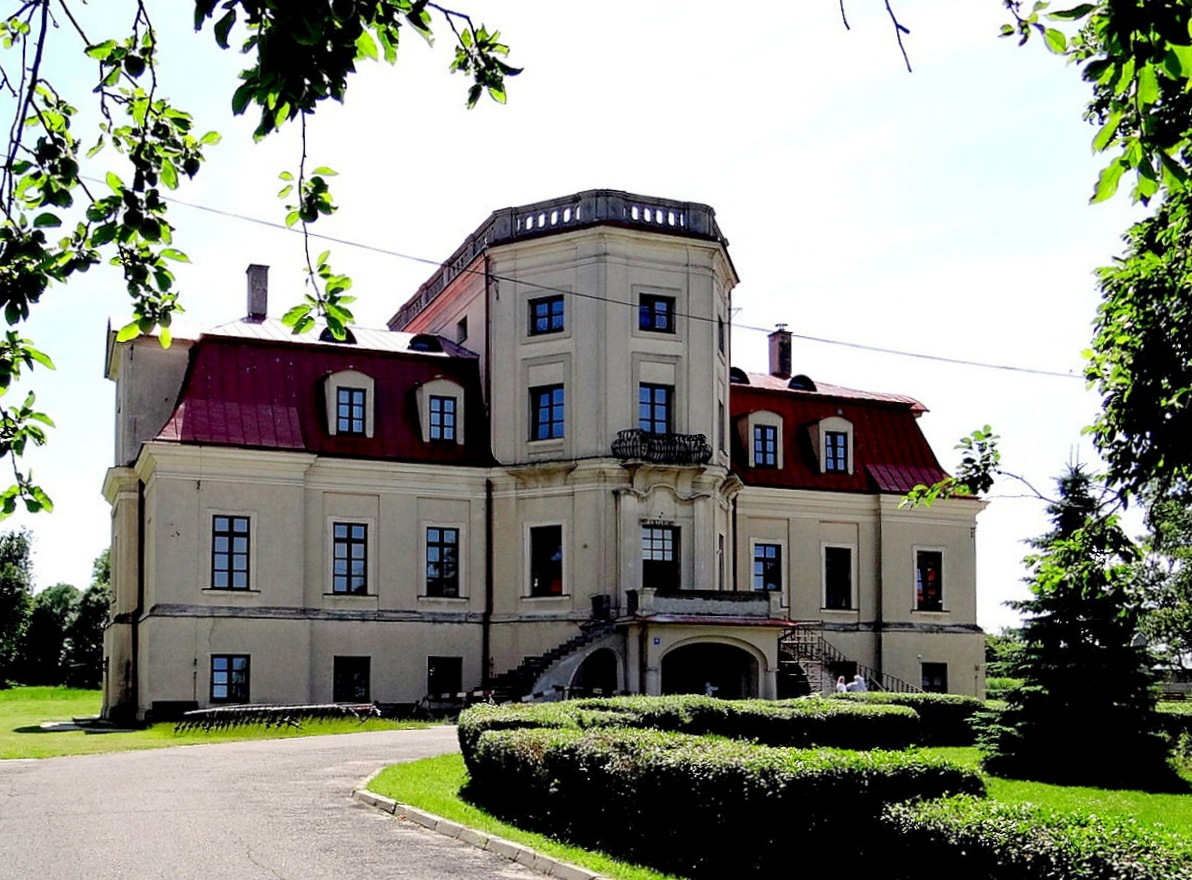
- Zamoyski Palace in Łabunie

- Location within Poland
- Coordinates: 50°40′N 23°22′E
- Country: Poland
- Voivodeship: Lublin
- County: Zamość
- Gmina: Łabunie

Population
  - Total: 1,670
- Time zone: UTC+1 (CET)
  - Summer (DST): UTC+2 (CEST)
- Vehicle registration: LZA
- Website: http://www.labunie.com.pl/

Łabunie ([waˈbuɲɛ]) is a village in Zamość County, Lublin Voivodeship, in southeastern Poland. It is the seat of the gmina (administrative district) called Gmina Łabunie.

== History ==
Nine Polish citizens were murdered by Nazi Germany in the village during World War II.

== Sights ==
The landmarks of Łabunie are the Baroque Zamoyski Palace complex with an adjacent park, and the Our Lady of the Scapular church.

== Sports ==
The local football club is Sparta Łabunie. It competes in the lower leagues.

== Notable people ==
- Wiktor Zarembiński (1902–1943), Polish Army officer, member of the Home Army and Cichociemni during World War II
- Andrzej Kowerski (1912–1988), Polish Army officer and SOE agent during World War II

== Gallery ==
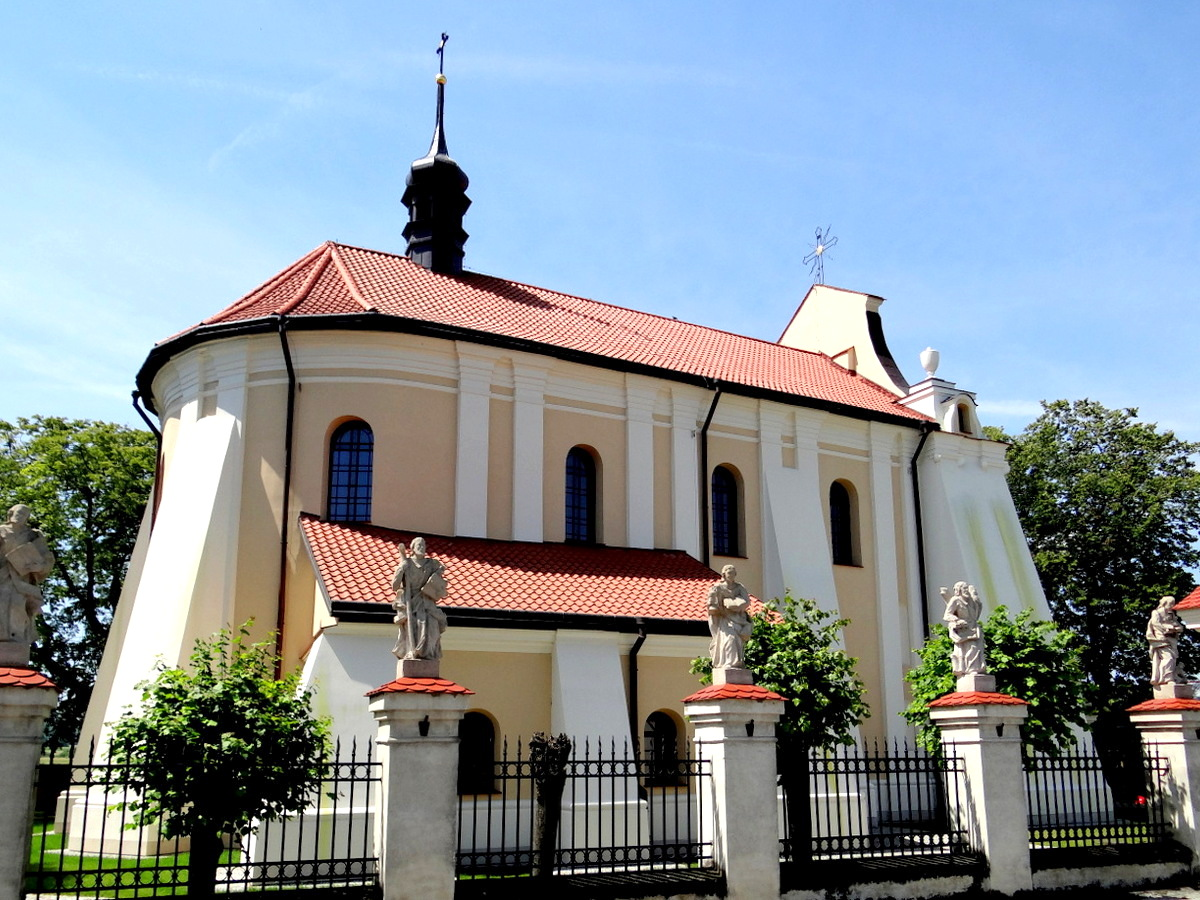
Our Lady of the Scapular church

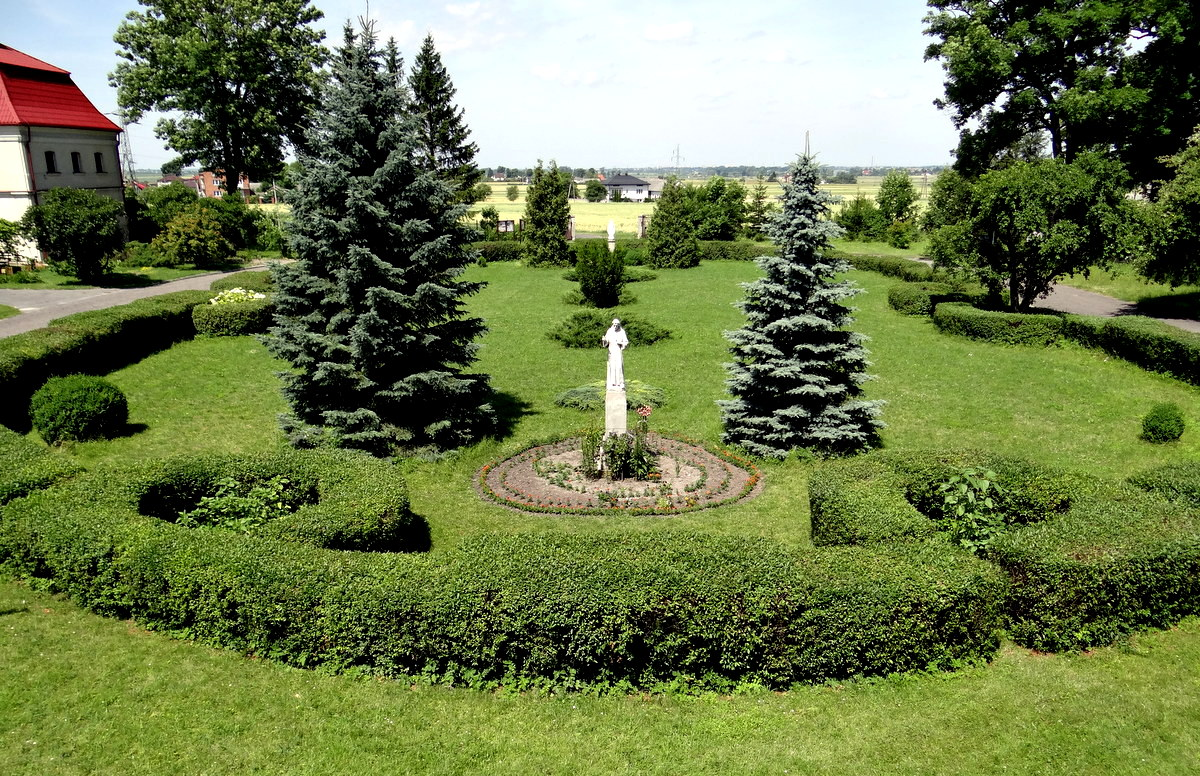
Park

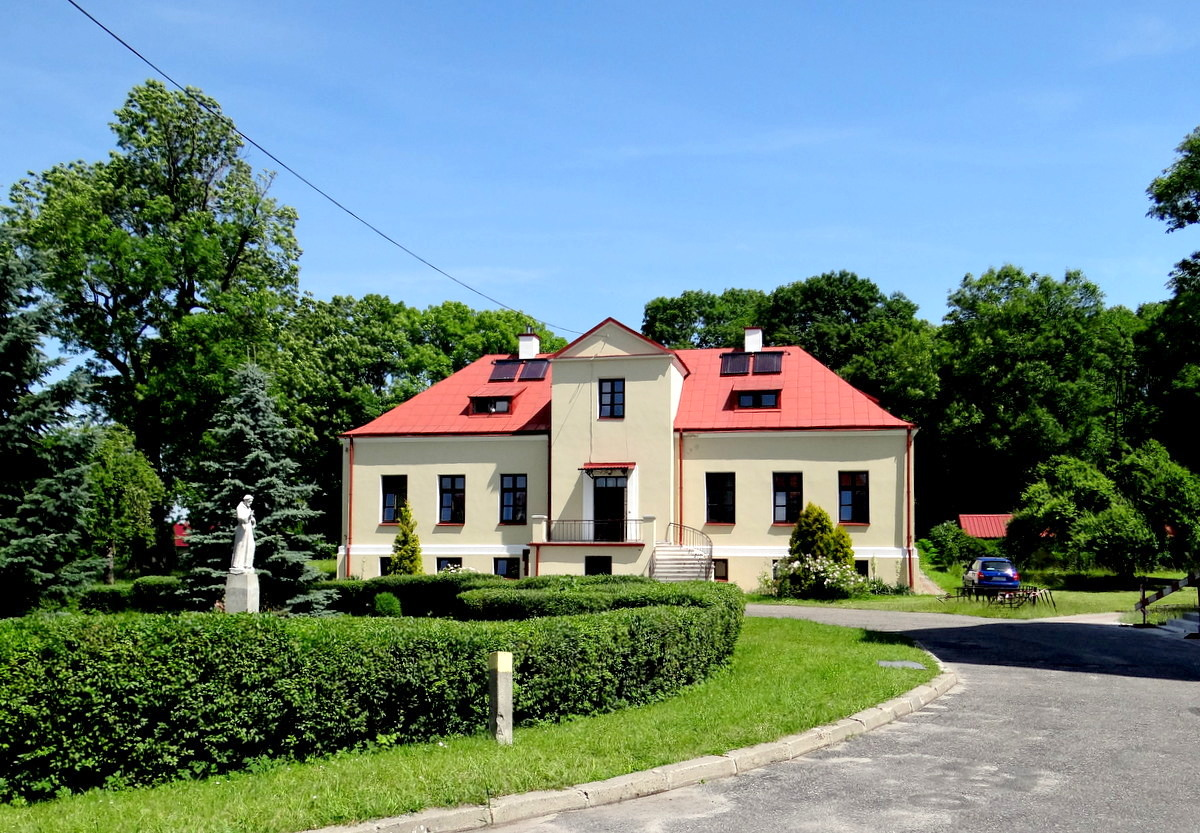
Palace outbuilding

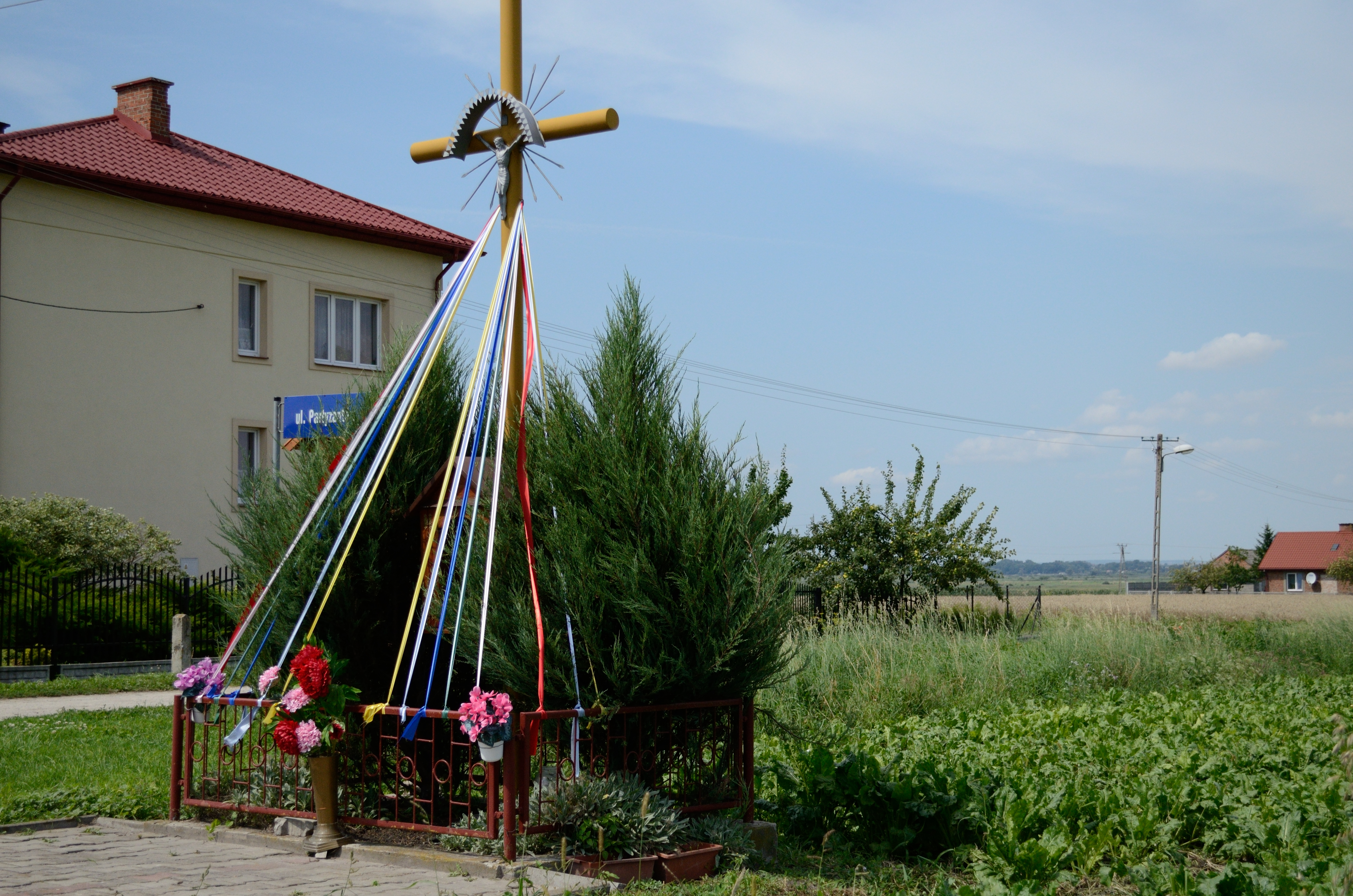
Wayside cross

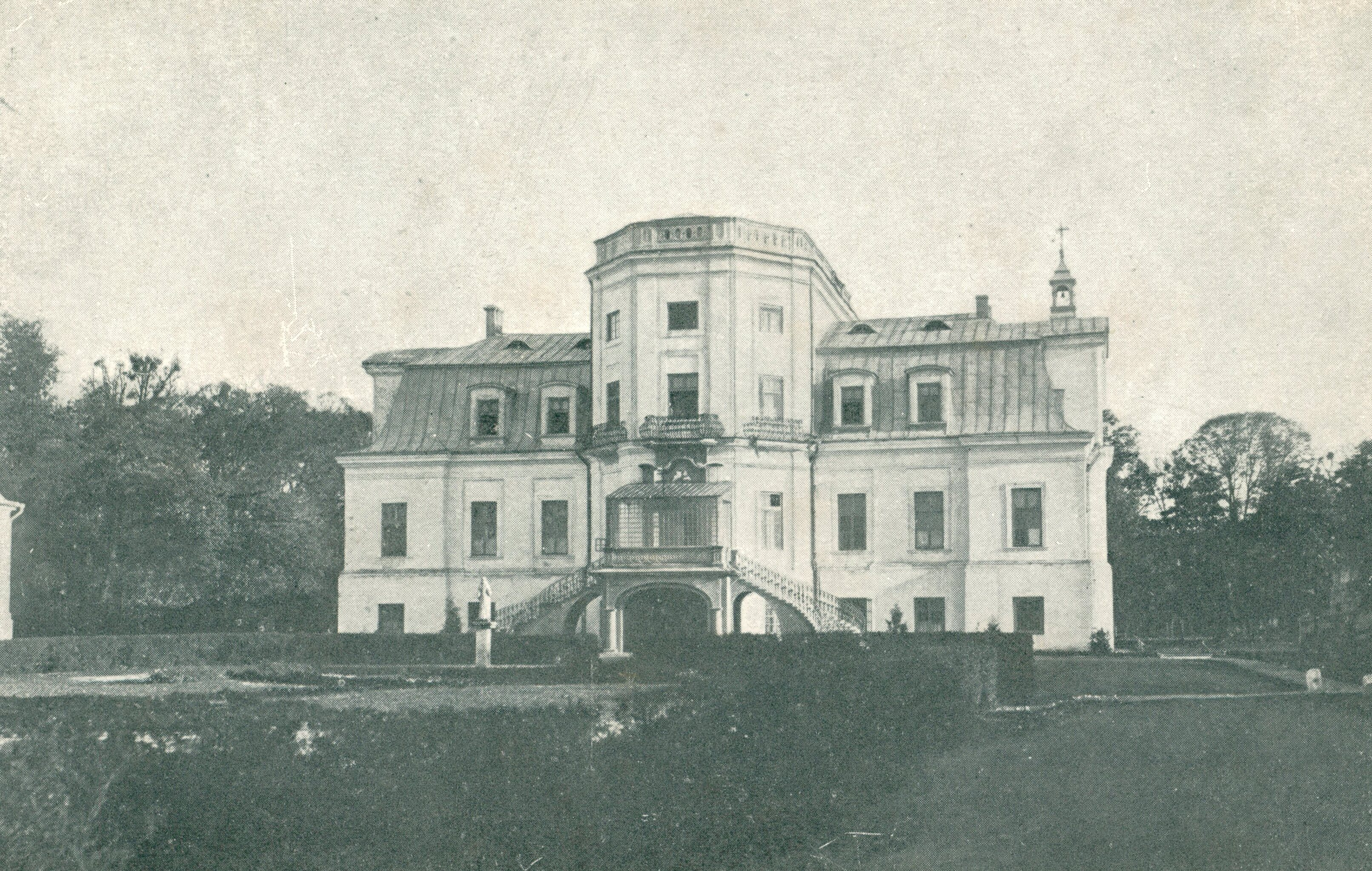
Palace (before 1944)

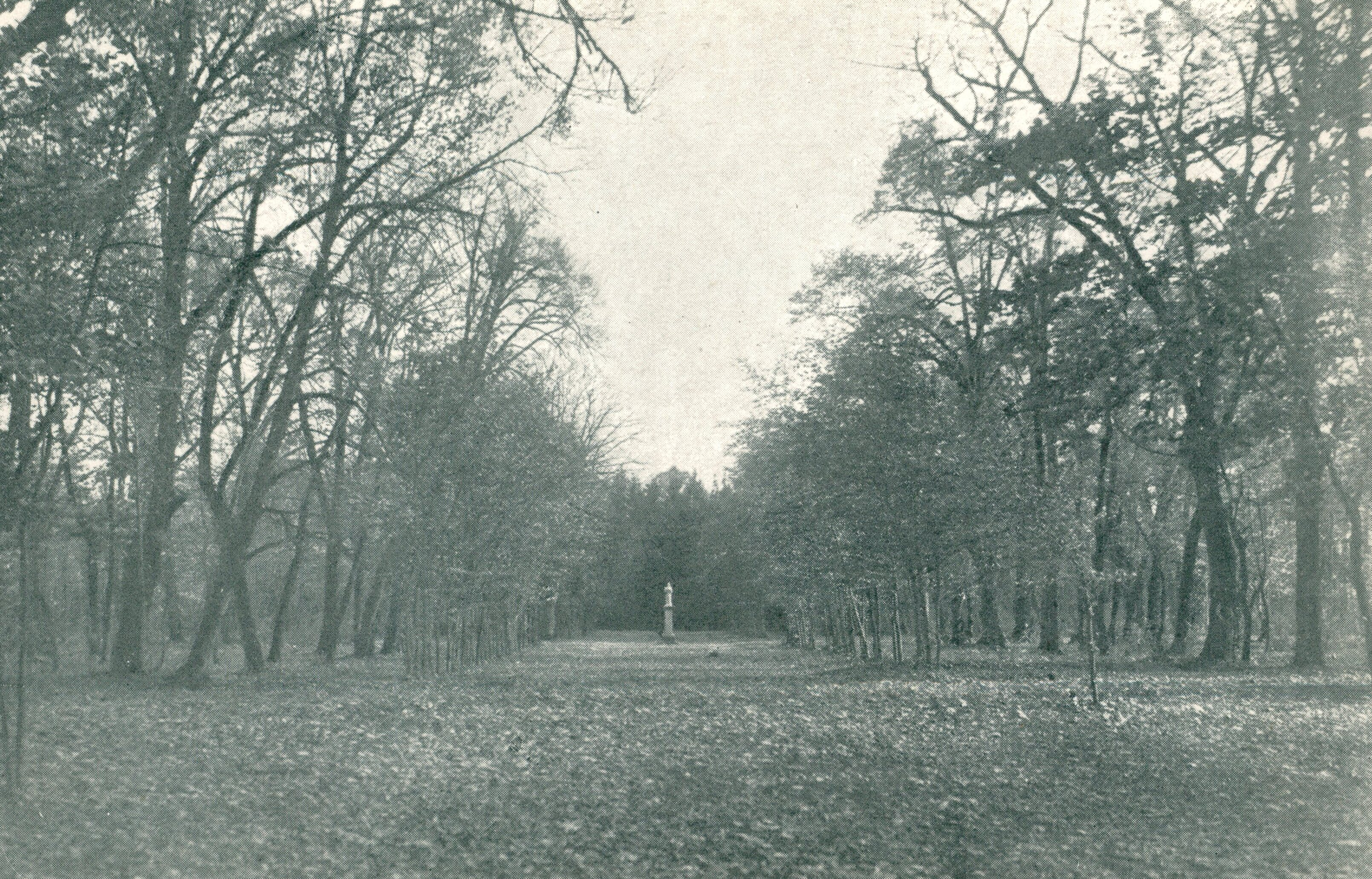
Park (before 1944)
