= Barchaczów =

- Village
- Location within Poland
- Coordinates: 50°41′N 23°22′E
- Country: Poland
- Voivodeship: Lublin
- County: Zamość
- Gmina: Łabunie
- Population: 460

Barchaczów [barˈxat͡ʂuf] is a village in the administrative district of Gmina Łabunie, within Zamość County, Lublin Voivodeship, in eastern Poland.
