= Łabuńki Pierwsze =

- Village
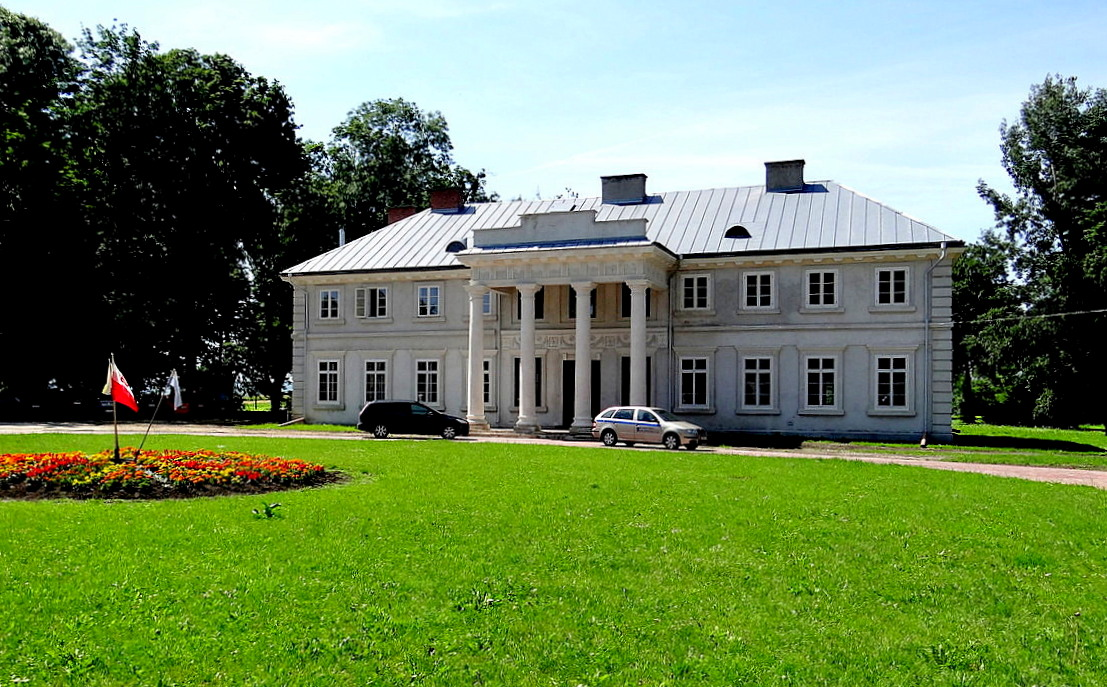
- Łabuńki Pierwsze Palace

- Location within Poland
- Coordinates: 50°41′2″N 23°20′28″E
- Country: Poland
- Voivodeship: Lublin
- County: Zamość
- Gmina: Łabunie
- Time zone: UTC+1 (CET)
  - Summer (DST): UTC+2 (CEST)
- Vehicle registration: LZA

Łabuńki Pierwsze [waˈbuɲki ˈpjɛrfʂɛ] is a village in the administrative district of Gmina Łabunie, within Zamość County, Lublin Voivodeship, in eastern Poland.
