= Brodek u Konice =

- Municipality
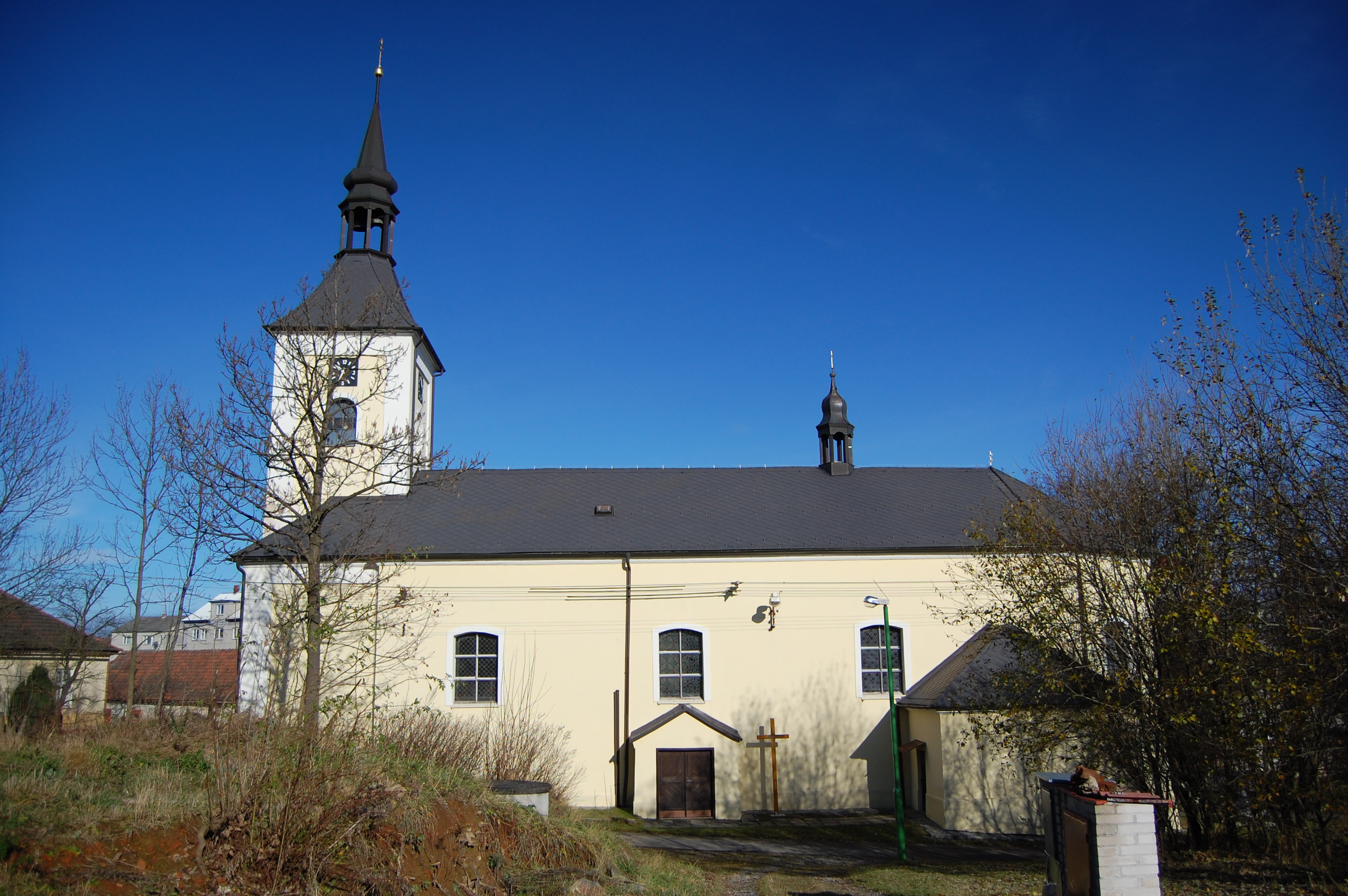
- Church of Saints Peter and Paul

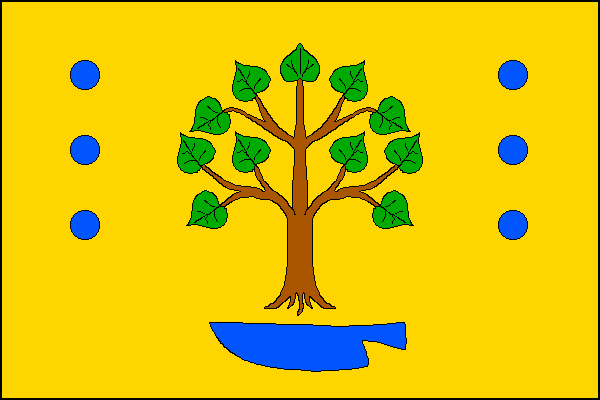
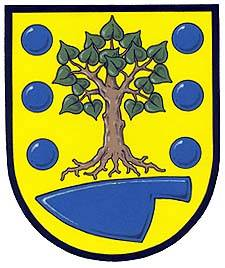
- Flag Coat of arms

- Location in the Czech Republic
- Coordinates: 49°32′55″N 16°49′58″E
- Country: Czech Republic
- Region: Olomouc
- District: Prostějov
- First mentioned: 1575

Area
  - Total: 14.16 km^{2} (5.47 sq mi)
- Elevation: 595 m (1,952 ft)

Population (2026-01-01)
  - Total: 799
  - Density: 56.4/km^{2} (146/sq mi)
- Time zone: UTC+1 (CET)
  - Summer (DST): UTC+2 (CEST)
- Postal code: 798 46
- Website: www.brodek-u-konice.cz

Brodek u Konice (German: Deutsch Brodek) is a municipality and village in Prostějov District in the Olomouc Region of the Czech Republic. It has about 800 inhabitants.

Brodek u Konice lies approximately 22 kilometres (14 mi) north-west of Prostějov, 31 km (19 mi) west of Olomouc, and 184 km (114 mi) east of Prague.

== Administrative division ==
Brodek u Konice consists of two municipal parts (in brackets population according to the 2021 census):

- Brodek u Konice (700)
- Lhota u Konice (80)

== History ==
The first written mention of Brodek u Konice is from 1575. Lhota u Konice was first mentioned in 1379.

== Demographics ==
Historical population
Year	Pop.	±%
1869	2,848	—
1880	2,855	+0.2%
1890	2,842	−0.5%
1900	2,539	−10.7%
1910	2,545	+0.2%
1921	2,234	−12.2%
1930	2,061	−7.7%
1950	1,217	−41.0%
1961	1,319	+8.4%
1970	1,191	−9.7%
1980	1,137	−4.5%
1991	1,012	−11.0%
2001	933	−7.8%
2011	868	−7.0%
2021	780	−10.1%
Source: Censuses
