= Bródek =

- Village
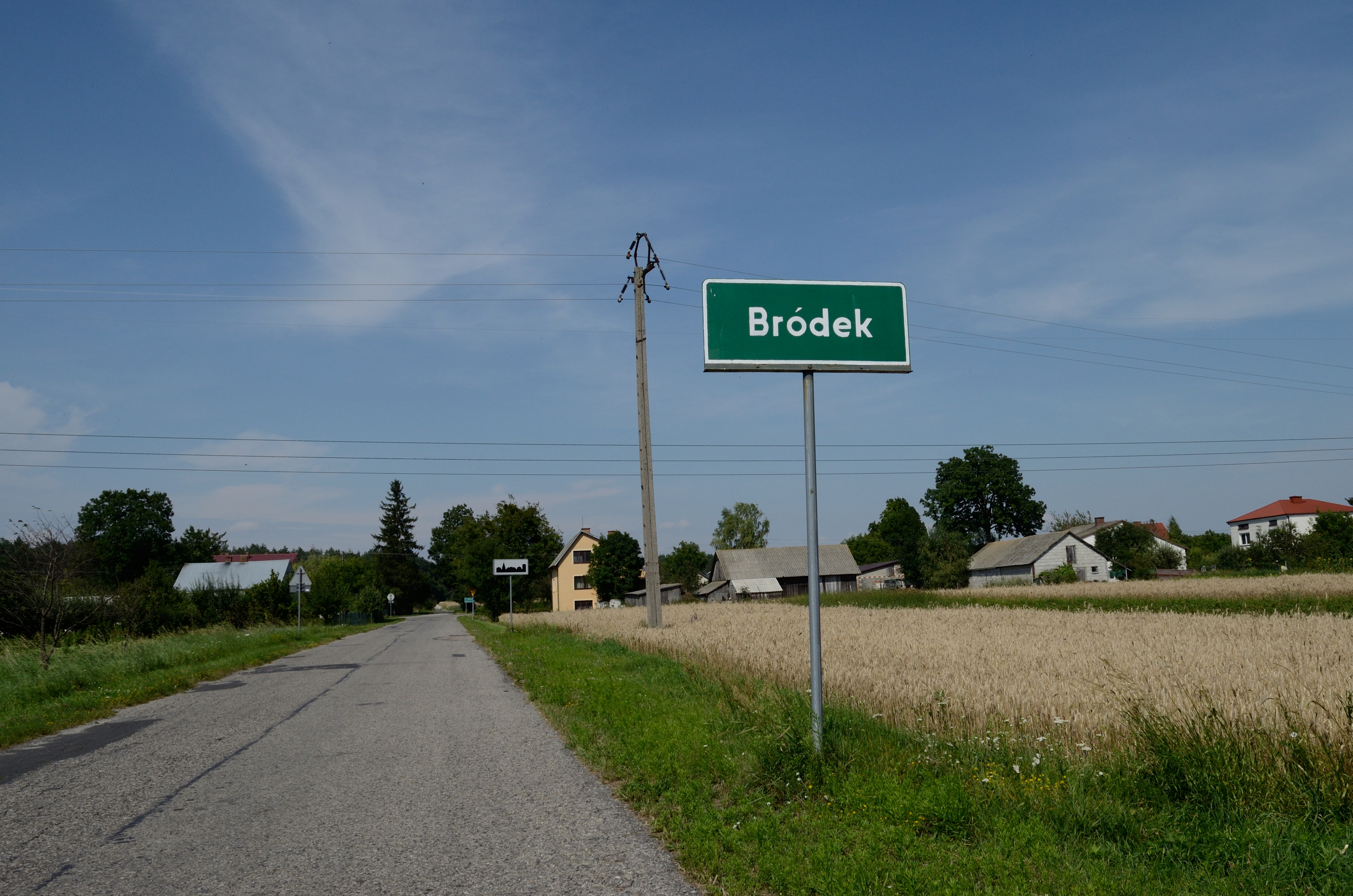
- Road sign leading to the village of Bródek

- Location within Poland
- Coordinates: 50°40′20″N 23°25′03″E
- Country: Poland
- Voivodeship: Lublin
- County: Zamość
- Gmina: Łabunie
- Time zone: UTC+1 (CET)
  - Summer (DST): UTC+2 (CEST)

Bródek [ˈbrudɛk] is a village in the administrative district of Gmina Łabunie, within Zamość County, Lublin Voivodeship, in eastern Poland.

== History ==
Three Polish citizens were murdered by Nazi Germany in the village during World War II.
