= Ruszów-Kolonia =

- Village
- Location within Poland
- Coordinates: 50°38′56″N 23°17′47″E
- Country: Poland
- Voivodeship: Lublin
- County: Zamość
- Gmina: Łabunie

Ruszów-Kolonia [ˈruʂuf kɔˈlɔɲa] is a village in the administrative district of Gmina Łabunie, within Zamość County, Lublin Voivodeship, in eastern Poland.
