= Anna Janko =

Polish poet, writer, columnist and literary critic

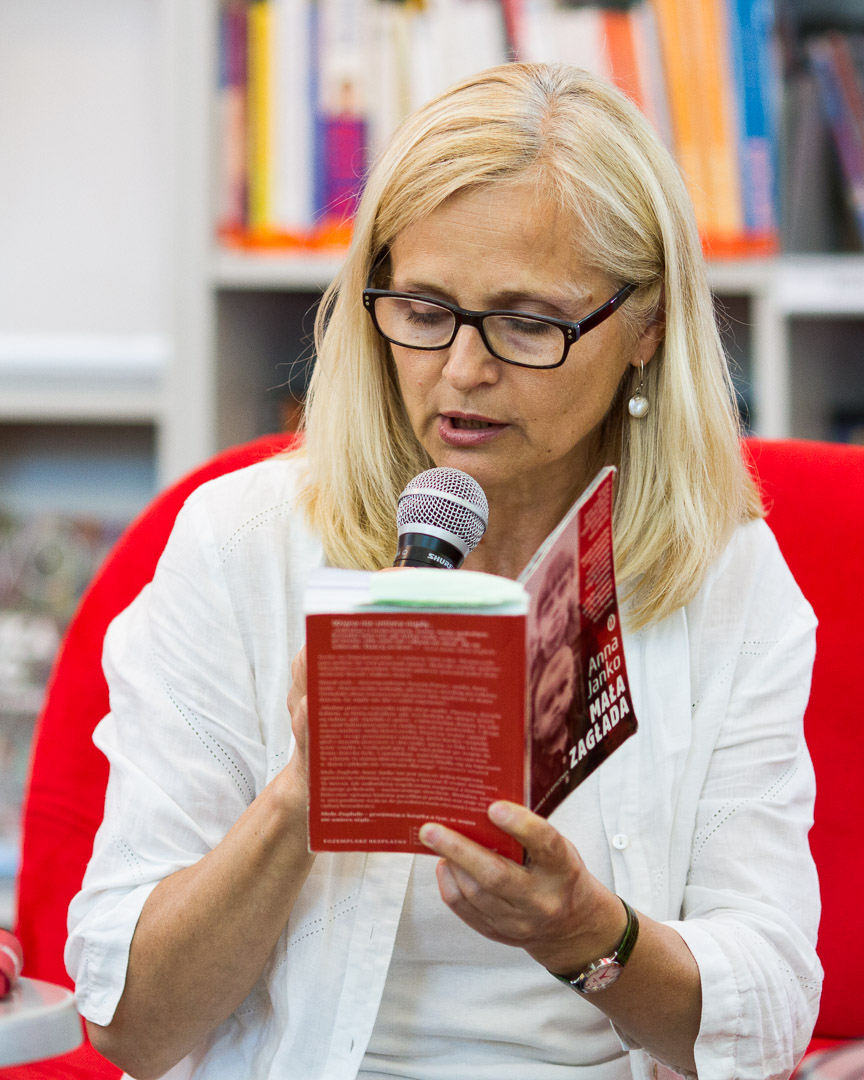
- Anna Janko in 2015
- Born: Aneta Jankowska; August 27, 1957; Rybnik, Silesian Voivodeship, Poland
- Occupations: poet, writer, columnist, literary critic
- Writing career
- Notable work: A Little Annihilation (Mała Zagłada)
- Notable awards: Youth Award named Włodzimierz Pietrzak for poetry (1980)., Literary Award of Władysław Reymont, for the novel Girl with Matches (2008), Literary Award for the author of "Gryfia" 2016 for the book Mała Zagłada (A Little Annihilation)

Anna Janko (born Aneta Jankowska, 27 August 1957), is a Polish poet, writer, columnist and literary critic.

== Life ==
Aneta Jankowska was born in Rybnik, in the Silesian Voivodeship, Poland, 27 August 1957. She is the daughter of Teresa Ferenc (born in 1934) and Zbigniew Jankowski. Her mother, as a 9-year-old child, survived the massacre carried out by the German army in the village of Sochy. Janko presented the event in her book Mała Zagłada (A Little Annihilation), published in 2015, which won the "Gryfia" Literary Award.

As a poet, she debuted in 1977. In the second half of the 1970s, she was associated with the poetry Nowa Prywatność (New Privacy). She collaborated with the Wrocław monthly magazine Odra, the Second Program of Polish Radio, and the magazine Pani. She currently cooperates with Zwierciadło.

She is a member of the PEN-club and the Stowarzyszenie Pisarzy Polskich (The Association of Polish Writers).

Olga Tokarczuk, winner Nobel Prize in Literature (2018), and winner of The Man Booker International Prize (2018) said about the book A Little Annihilation (Mała Zagłada): "Scenes from the war live on as trauma in the memory of the next generation. A Little Annihilation by Anna Janko is an extraordinarily personal and powerful account of how the worst wartime atrocities affect ordinary people and are seldom recorded in the official histories."

Critic Artur Sandauer said about Anna Janko: "A female Rimbaud".

== Publications ==
Poetry

- List do królika doświadczalnego, 1977 ("Letter to a Guinea Pig")
- Wykluwa się staruszka, 1979
- Diabłu świeca, 1980
- Koronki na rany, 1989
- Zabici czasem długo stoją, 1995 ("The dead sometimes stand for a long time")
- Świetlisty cudzoziemiec, 2000 ("A shining foreigner")
- Du bist Der, niemieckojęzyczny wybór wierszy, Berlin, 2000 (Du bist Der, German-language selection of poems", Berlin)
- Wiersze z cieniem, 2010 ("Poems with shadows")
- Miłość, śmierć i inne wzory, 2016 ("Love, death and other patterns")

Prose

- Dziewczyna z zapałkami, Nowy Świat 2007, 2009, 2010, 2012 (Wydawnictwo Literackie) (Girl with Matches)
- Maciupek i Maleńtas. Niezwykłe przygody w Brzuchu Mamy, Nasza Księgarnia 2012 ("Maciupek and Maleńtas. Unusual adventures in Mother's Belly.")
- Pasja według św. Hanki, Wydawnictwo Literackie 2012 ("Passion according to st. Hanka")
- Boscy i nieznośni. Niezwykłe biografie, Wydawnictwo Zwierciadło, 2012 ("Divine and unbearable. Unusual biographies") (about, among others, Margaret Mitchell, Mia Farrow, Czesław Miłosz, and Dustin Hoffman)
- Mała zagłada (A Little Annihilation), Wydawnictwo Literackie, 2015

Drama

- Rzeź lalek, 1981, Teatr Współczesny w Szczecinie, reż. Andrzej Chrzanowski. ("Doll slaughter")
- Śmierć to dobry początek, słuchowisko radiowe, 2 program Polskiego Radia, 2005, reż. Henryk Rozen. ("Death is a good start", a radio play, 2nd program of Polish Radio)

== Awards and honors ==
- Nagroda Młodych im Włodzimierza Pietrzaka za twórczość poetycką, 1980. ("Włodzimierz Pietrzak Youth Award for poetry")
- Nagroda Gdańska Książka Roku za tom Diabłu świeca, 1981. ("Gdańsk Book of the Year Award")
- Nagroda Związku Pisarzy Niezależnych w Dreźnie za twórczość poetycką, 1993. ("Award of the Union of Independent Writers in Dresden for poetic work")
- Nominacja do Nagrody Literackiej Nike za tom Świetlisty cudzoziemiec, 2001. ("Nomination for the Nike Literary Award for the volume Shining foreigner ")
- Nagroda Książka Wiosny 2007 Poznańskiego Przeglądu Nowości Wydawniczych za powieść Dziewczyna z zapałkami ("Book of the Spring 2007 Award of the Poznań News Publishing Review for the novel Girl with Matches)
- Nagroda Warszawskiej Premiery Literackiej za powieść Dziewczyna z zapałkami, Książka Czerwca 2007 ("Warsaw Literary Premiere Award for the novel Girl with Matches, Book June 2007")
- Nominacja do Nagrody Literackiej Srebrny Kałamarz im. Hermenegildy Kociubińskiej, 2008 ("Nomination for the Silver Inkwell Hermenegildy Kociubińska, 2008")
- Nominacja do Nagrody Mediów Cogito za powieść Dziewczyna z zapałkami, 2008 ("Nomination to the Cogito Media Award for the novel Girl with Matches, 2008")
- Nominacja do Literackiej Nagrody Europy Środkowej Angelus za powieść Dziewczyna z zapałkami, 2008. ("Nomination for the Angelus Central European Literary Award for the novel Girl with Matches, 2008")
- Nagroda Literacka im. Władysława Reymonta, za powieść Dziewczyna z zapałkami, 2008 ("Władysław Reymont Literary Award for the novel Girl with Matches, 2008")
- Nagroda Książka Lata 2012 Poznańskiego Przeglądu Nowości Wydawniczych, za Pasję według św. Hanki
- Nominacja do Nagrody Literackiej dla Autorki Gryfia 2013, za Pasję według św. Hanki (finalistka)
- Nominacja do Literackiej Nagrody Nike 2013, za powieść Pasja według św. Hanki
- Wyróżnienie w Ogólnopolskim Konkursie im. Kornela Makuszyńskiego za książkę dla dzieci Maciupek i Maleńtas. Niezwykłe przygody w brzuchu Mamy, 2013 ("Distinction in the National Kornel Makuszyński Competition for the book for children Maciupek and Maleńtas. Unusual adventures in Mama's belly, 2013")
- Nominacja do Nagrody Literackiej i Historycznej Identitas za książkę Mała zagłada, 2015. ("Nomination for the Identitas Literary and Historical Award for the book A Little Annihilation, 2015")
- Nominacja w III edycji Nagrody Newsweeka im. Teresy Torańskiej (2015) w kategorii "Najlepsza książka" za książkę Mała zagłada ("Nomination in the third edition of Newsweek Award Teresa Torańska (2015) in the 'Best Book' category for the book A Little Annihilation")
- Nagroda miesięcznika „Nowe książki" za rok 2015 za książkę Mała zagłada ("Award of the monthly 'New Books' for 2015 for the book A Little Annihilation"
- Nagroda Literacka m.st. Warszawy 2016 w kategorii proza za książkę Mała zagłada ("Literary Award of the Capital City of Warsaw Warsaw 2016 in the prose category for the book A Little Annihilation")
- Nagroda Literacka dla Autorki „Gryfia" 2016 za książkę Mała zagłada ("Literary Award for the Author "Gryfia" 2016 for the book A Little Annihilation")
- Finał Literackiej Nagrody Europy Środkowej Angelus za książkę Mała zagłada ("The final of the Angelus Central European Literary Award for the book A Little Annihilation")

== See also ==
- List of Polish-language authors
- List of Polish-language poets
- List of Poles
