= Sochy massacre =

181–200 Polish civilians massacred by German SS, police in 1943

- Part of World War II
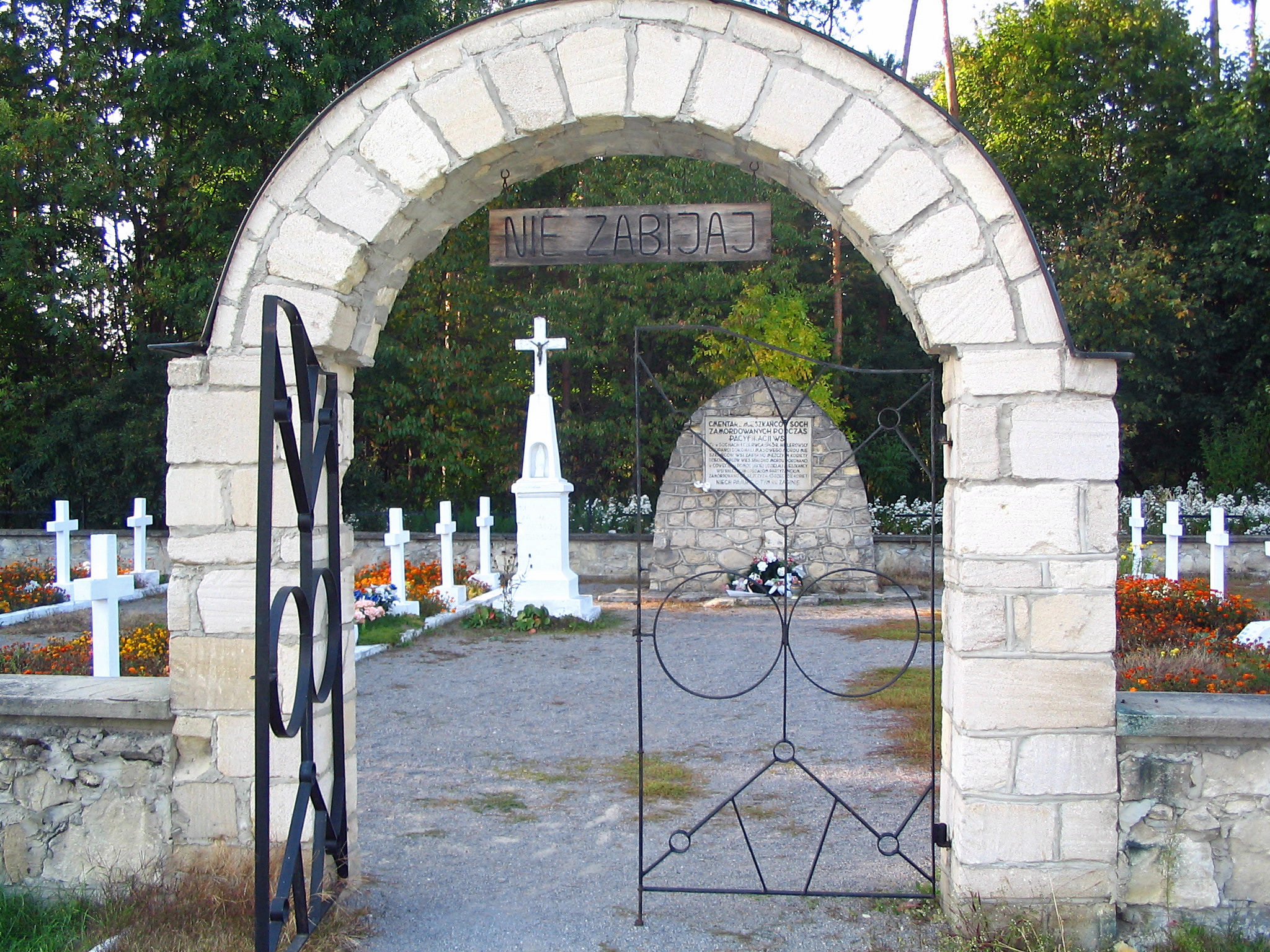
- Cemetery of Polish victims murdered by German Nazis during the massacre of the village of Sochy. Gate with the inscription from the Decalogue "5. Thou shalt not kill".

- Sochy (Poland)
- Location: 50.5833°N 22.9500°E; Sochy, Lublin Voivodeship, Poland
- Date: 1 June 1943
- Deaths: 181–200 killed
- Victim: Polish civilians
- Perpetrators: Nazi Germany, SS

The Sochy massacre occurred on 1 June 1943 in the village of Sochy, Lublin Voivodeship in Zamość County, Lublin Voivodeship during the German occupation of Poland when approximately 181–200 of its inhabitants, including women and children, were massacred by the German Ordnungspolizei and SS in retaliation for the village's support for the Polish resistance movement.

== Background ==
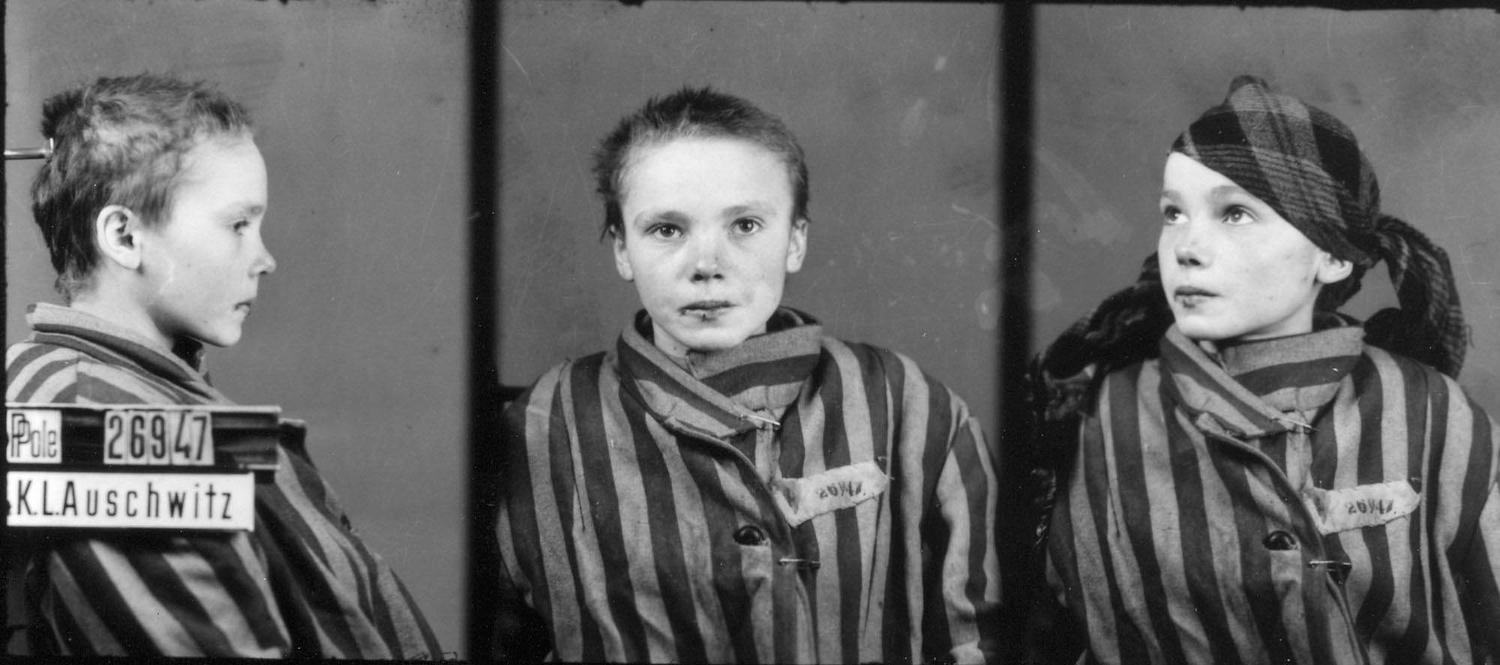
Polish child Czesława Kwoka number 26947 from region Zamość died in German Nazi Auschwitz concentration camp.

During World War II and the occupation of Poland by Nazi Germany (1939–1945), Poles were subjected to terror and mass German repression, both in cities and in the villages. Hundreds of Polish villages were forcibly pacified, had their inhabitants massacred, or were completely destroyed by the German occupiers.

An incomplete list drawn up after World War II estimates that 299 such Polish villages were destroyed by German forces, including Rajsk, 16 April 1942 (142 murdered); Krasowo-Częstki, 17 July 1943 (259 murdered); Skłoby, 11 April 1940 (215 murdered); Michniów, 13 July 1943 (203 murdered); Józefów, 14 April 1940 (169 murdered); Kitów, 11 December 1942 (174 murdered); Sumin, 29 January 1943 (118 murdered); Sochy, 1 June 1943 (181 murdered); Borów, 2 February 1944 (232 murdered); Łążek, 2 February 1944 (187 murdered); Szczecyn, 2 February 1944 (368); Jamy, Lublin Voivodeship, 3 March 1944 (147 murdered); Milejów, 6 September 1939 (150 murdered); Kaszyce, 7 March 1943 (117 murdered); Krusze, 31 August 1944 (158 murdered); Lipniak-Majorat, 2 September 1944 (370 murdered) and many others.

The largest pacification operation took place between November 1942 and August 1943 in the region of Zamość in Poland, which was selected by the Germans for German colonization as part of the Generalplan Ost plan. More than 110,000 Polish peasants, 31 percent of the Zamość population, were expelled from 300 villages; Some were taken to Germany as slave labor while many others were sent to the Auschwitz or Majdanek concentration camps where they were murdered. A number of Polish children were taken away from their families and deported with the intention of being Germanized. Those who were not killed or deported were driven from their homes by the German General Government. The occupants' next plans were to depopulate another 400 Polish villages.

Pacification and expulsion of Poles in the Lublin region was under the control of the SS commander and police chief in the Lublin District, SS-Brigadeführer Odilo Globocnik. The first deportations took place on the night of 27–28 November 1942. By the end of December, 60 villages inhabited by about 34,000 Poles were depopulated. The second phase of the operation lasted from mid-January to the end of March 1943 and covered mainly the areas of the Hrubieszów poviat. 63 villages had been displaced by then.

The Germans' actions was met with passive resistance from the displaced population and by armed reactions from the Polish resistance movement. Guerrilla units of the Peasant Battalions, the Home Army and the People's Guard attempted to stop the Germans' pacification and displacement efforts by attacking German economic and communication facilities, as well as through attacks against the Germans themselves and their colonists occupying the pacified Polish villages. The resistance posed by the Polish guerrillas, as well as the difficult situation of German troops on the Eastern Front, forced the occupiers to temporarily halt their depopulation efforts. They resumed in the last days of June 1943. Before that, the Germans carried out a series of violent pacification operations in the Zamość region. One of the victims of these actions was the village of Sochy in the commune of Zwierzyniec.

Probably the reason for the pacification was the cooperation of the inhabitants of Sochy with the Polish resistance. According to witnesses, shortly before the massacre, Gestapo agents appeared in the village, claiming to be partisans, examining the attitude of the population to the Polish resistance. Extermination in Sochy was one of the many pacifications that the Germans carried out in the Zamość region and in Poland.

== Massacre ==
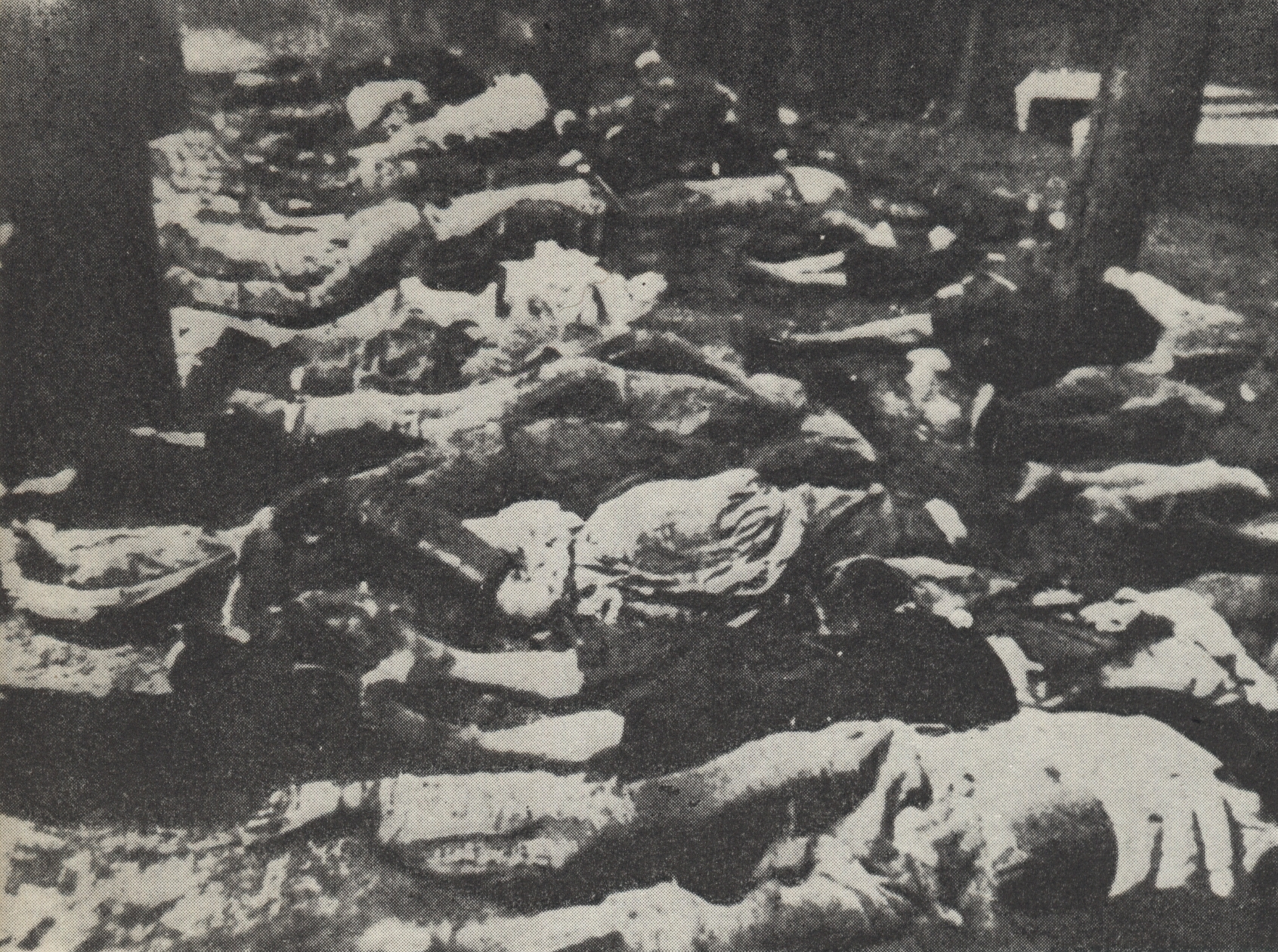
Bodies of inhabitants of the village of Sochy murdered by the Germans

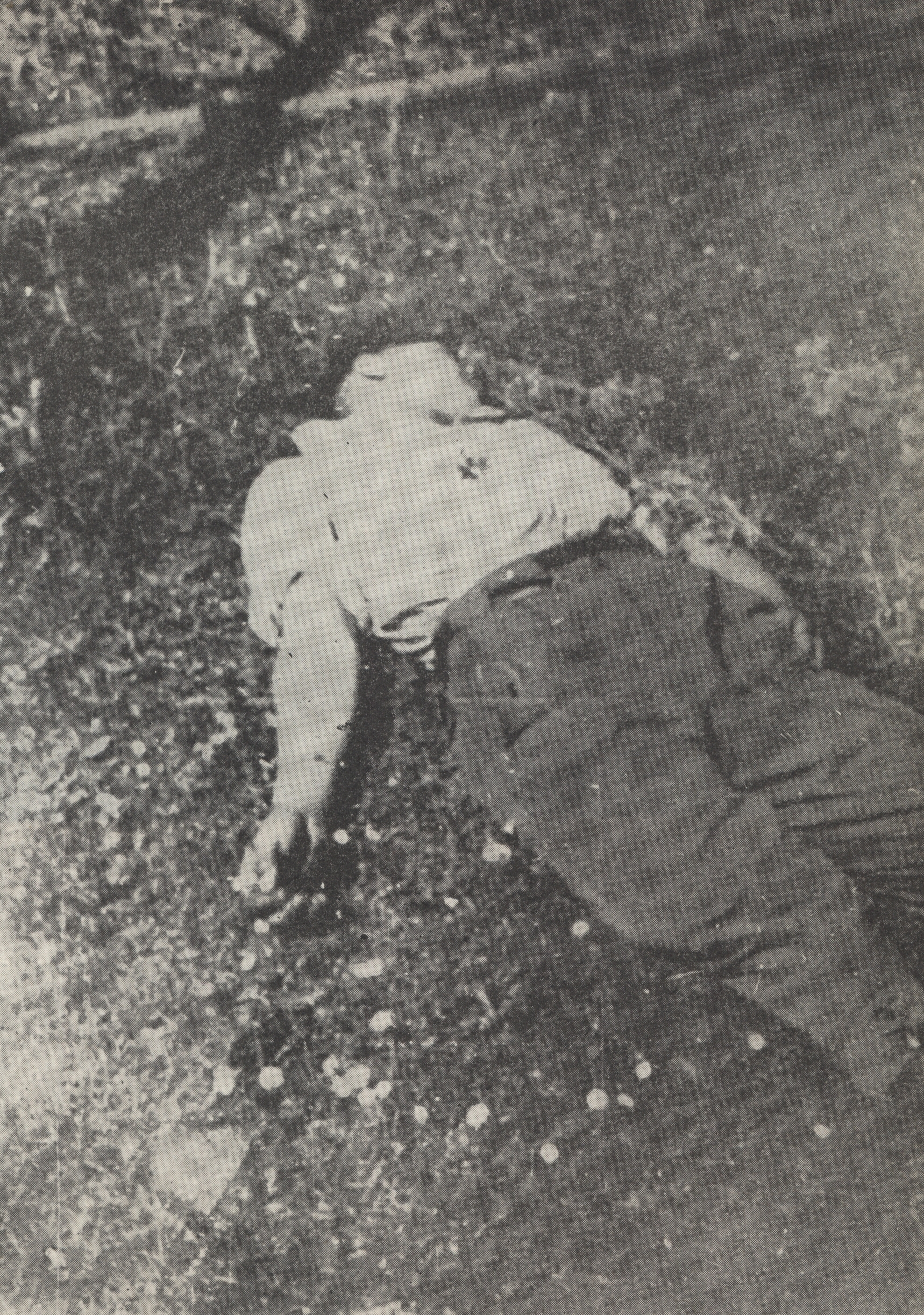
A boy, victim of the German Nazi massacre in Sochy

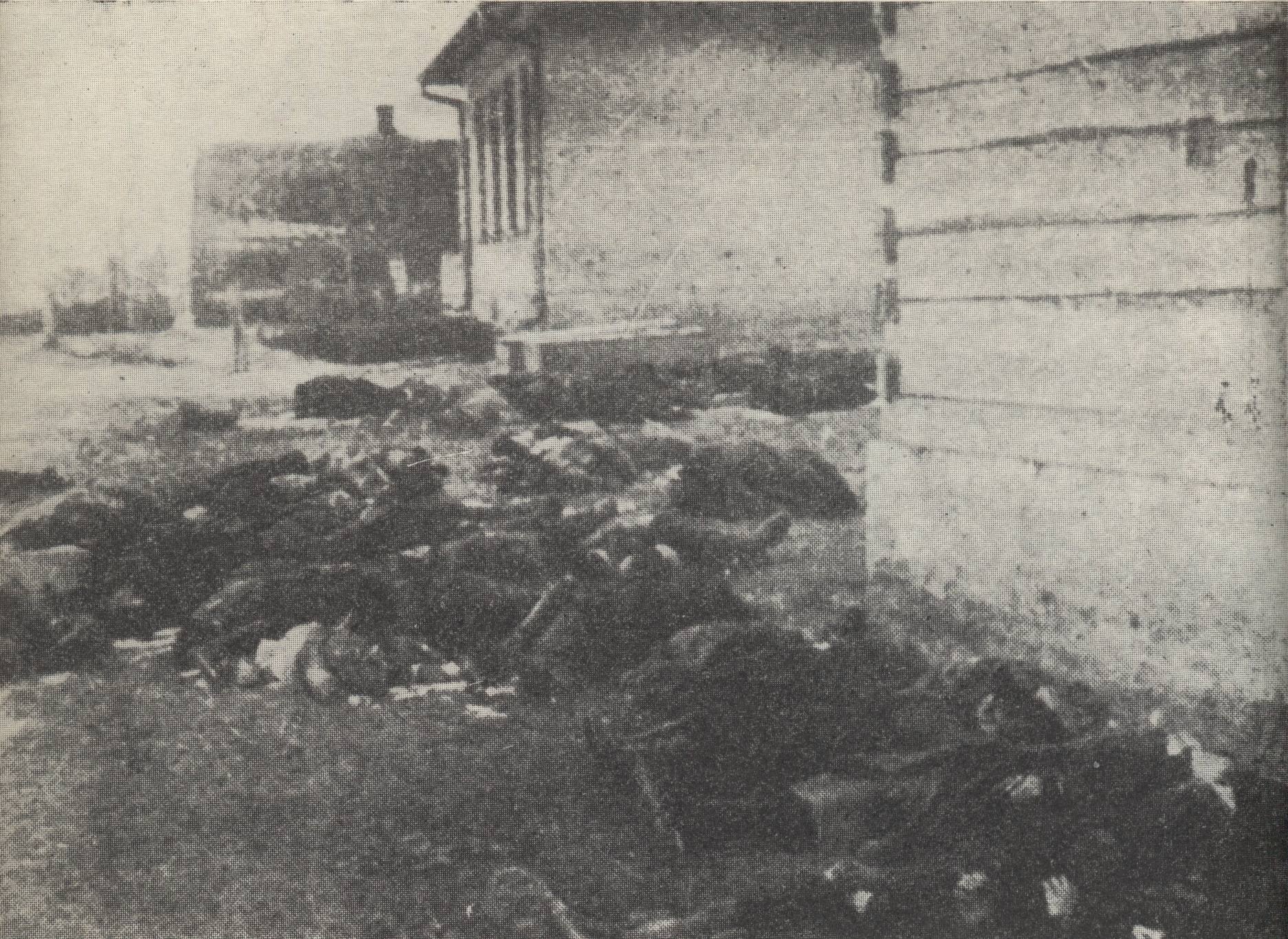
Victims of the massacre in the village of Sochy

Early in the morning of June 1, 1943, German troops arrived in Sochy. The pacification expedition included mainly German Ordnungspolizei officers stationed in Zamość. They were also accompanied by SS members and Ukrainian or Russian-speaking collaborators. The village of Sochy is located in a valley. The Germans were on the slopes of this valley and then surrounded the village with a tight cordon. When the inhabitants saw the Germans, they began to take their belongings out of their homes because they expected that displacement action would start soon.

But the Germans entered the village and began a systematic massacre. Women, children, men and old people were murdered. The buildings were set on fire together with the wounded left inside. There were also cases of Germans throwing victims into burning buildings. Whole families were killed during the pacification.

Around 8:00 am, the German police withdrew from Sochy. Then, 7 to 10 Luftwaffe aircraft bombed and fired machine guns at both the village and nearby fields, where the survivors of the first phase of the massacre were hiding. A dozen or so other people were killed. It was the first case in occupied Poland of the use of military aviation by the German occupiers during the pacification of villages.

During the pacification, the German Luftwaffe also bombarded the Polish villages of Momoty Dolne, Momoty Górne, Pawłów, Chełm County, Tokary, Lublin Voivodeship, and Klew.

The number of victims of the massacre is estimated at 181, 182, 183 or about 200 people. Nearly half of the village inhabitants were killed. Some people were outside the village. According to Czesław Madajczyk, 106 men, 53 women and 24 children were among the victims, other sources say that 108 men and 54 women or 103 women and children were murdered. The Register of places and facts of crimes committed by the Nazi occupier in Poland in the years 1939–1945 contains the names of 159 identified victims of pacification. The rest were buried unidentified. The village was almost completely burned; only three residential houses and two barns survived.

== Epilogue ==
The Germans ordered the municipal authorities to organize a burial of victims. Among the ruins and piles of corpses, the inhabitants of the surrounding towns found about 25 seriously wounded. They were taken to the hospital in Biłgoraj. The murdered inhabitants of Sochy were buried in seven mass graves.

The massacre echoed widely. Reports about the Polish underground and underground press informed about it. In retaliation for the massacre and pacification of Sochy, partisan units of the Polish Underground State of the Home Army commanded by Adam Piotrowski, pseud. "Dolina", Jan Turowski pseud. "Norbert" and Tadeusz Kuncewicz pseud. "Podkowa" attacked the village of Siedliska occupied by German colonists (5/6 June 1943). According to underground sources, 60 people were killed and 140 farms burned.

== Memorial ==
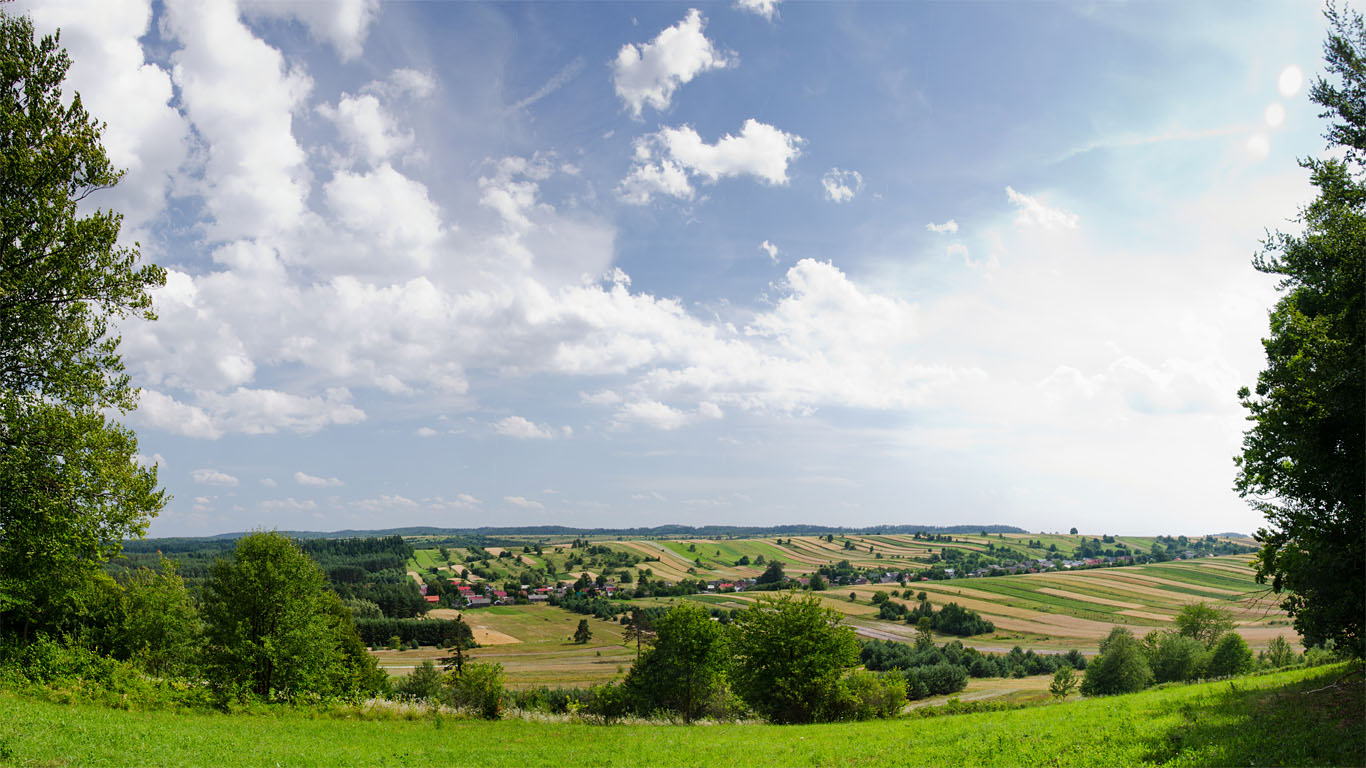
The Poles rebuilt the village. Picturesque view of the village of Sochy from Bukowa Góra

In the village of Sochy there is a cemetery with mass graves of victims of the massacre carried out by the German Nazi occupiers. A gate with an inscription – one of the commandments from the Decalogue, "5. Thou shalt not kill" ("Nie zabijaj"), leads to the cemetery. A monument was also built to commemorate the victims, among whom there were about 45 children, 52 women and 88 men who were murdered. There is also a board near the cemetery informing about the pacification and extermination of the inhabitants of the village of Sochy by German invaders, in three languages: Polish, German and English.

== In culture ==
The work of the poet Teresa Ferenc, who, as a nine-year-old child, survived the pacification of Sochy and lost both her parents in it, refers to the massacre in Sochy and World War II.

The family trauma associated with the pacification of Sochy is the main theme of the book "A Small Annihilation" (Mała Zagłada) (2015 edition), whose author is the daughter of Teresa Ferenc, Anna Janko.

Based on the book by Anna Janko, a documentary film entitled "A Small Annihilation" (Mała Zagłada) was created.

== Gallery ==
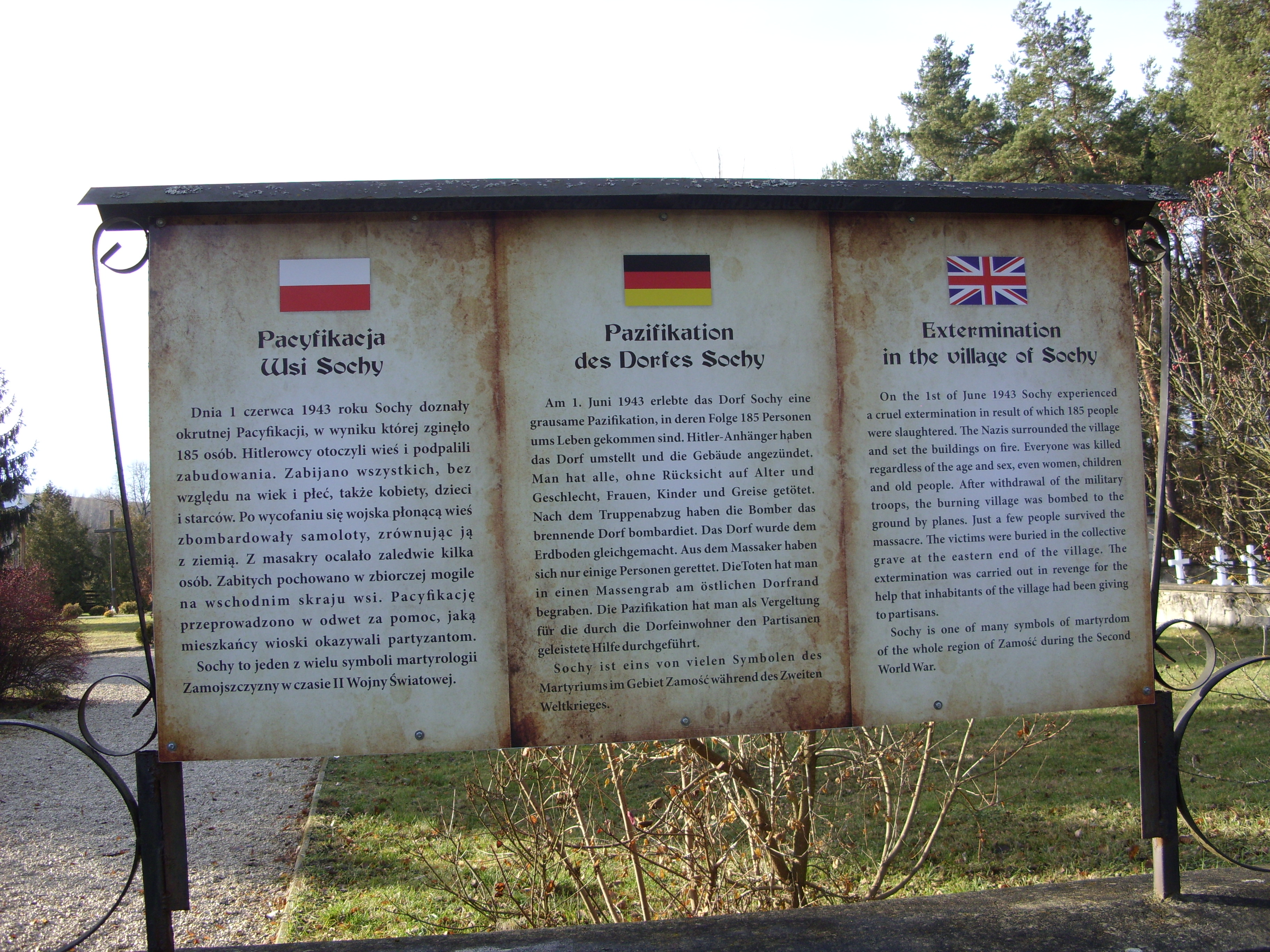
A board informing about the massacre of the village of Sochy on 1 June 1943 by Nazi Germans

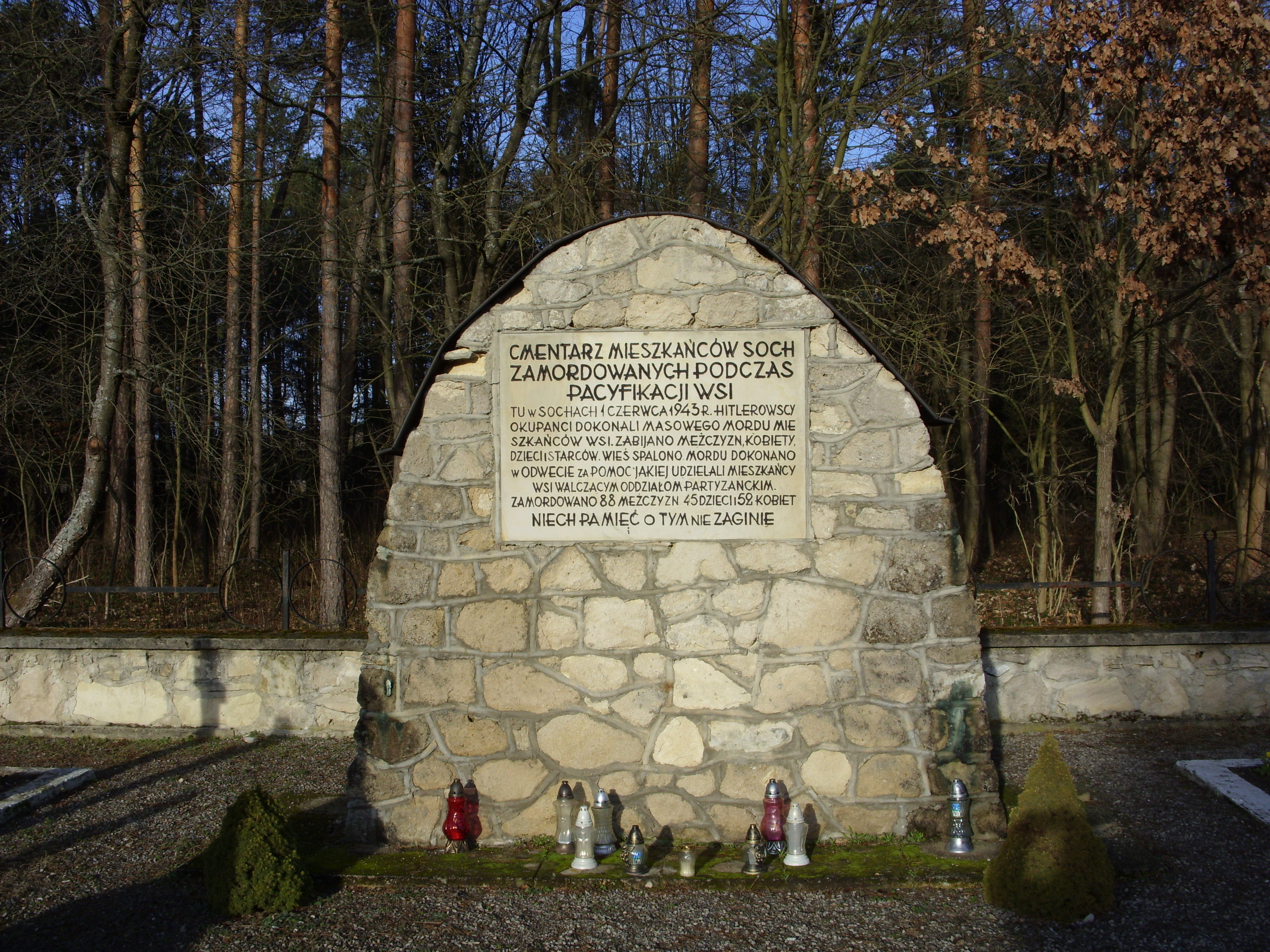
A monument in memory of Polish civilians victims of the German Nazi massacre in Sochy 1 June 1943, Poland

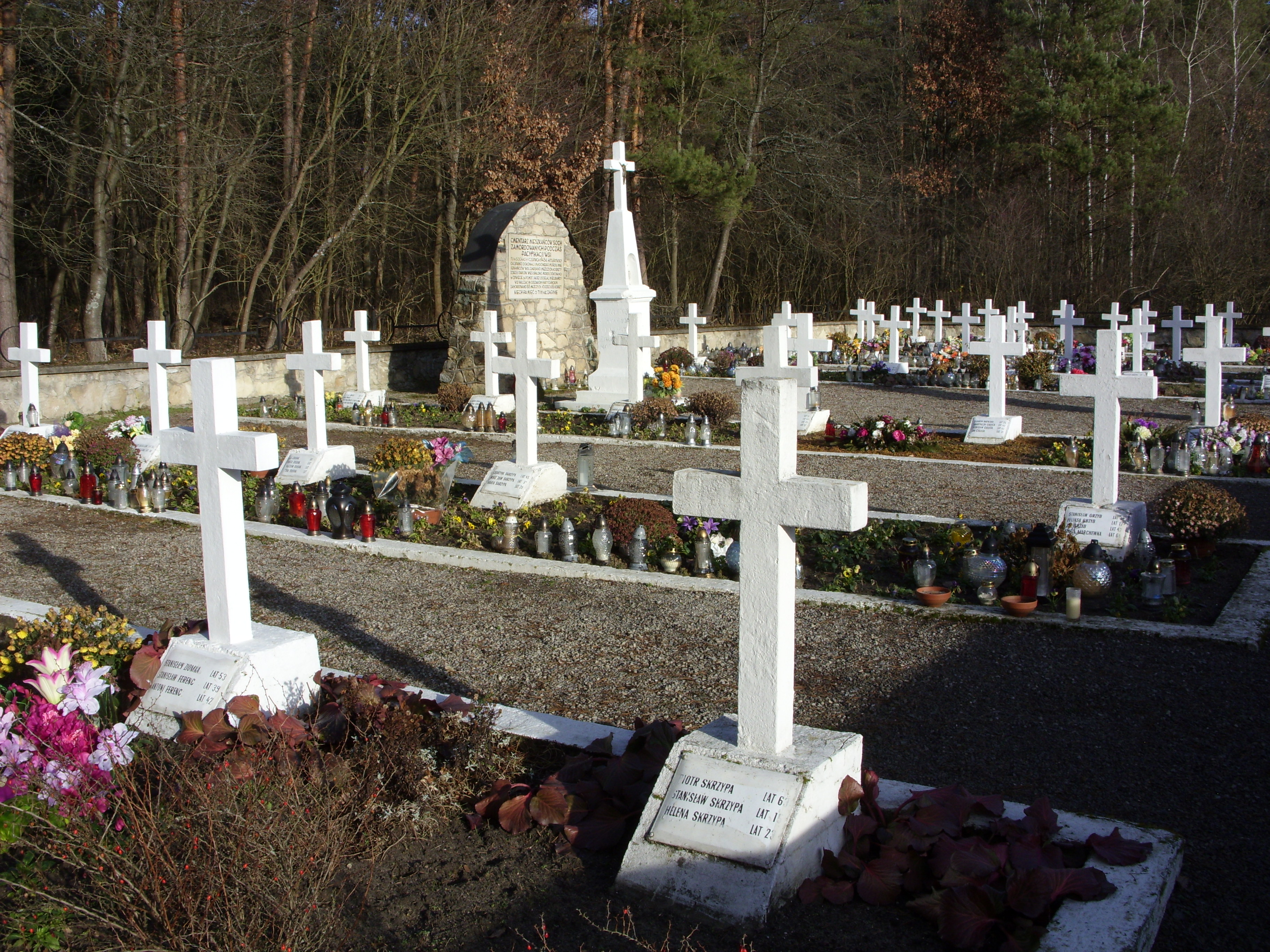
Cemetery of Polish victims of the German Nazi massacre in Sochy from 1 June 1943
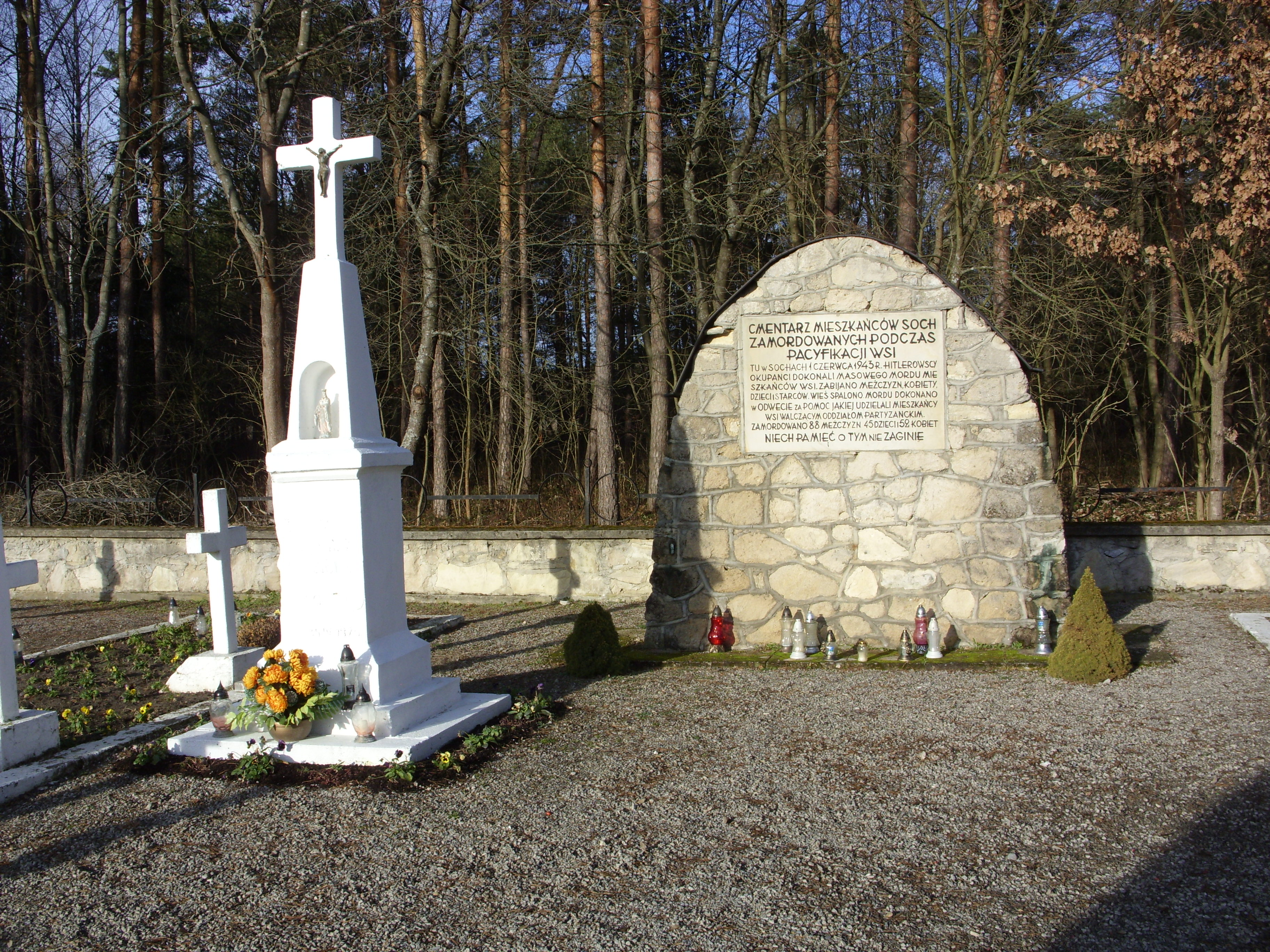
Monument and cross at the cemetery of Polish victims of the German Nazi massacre in Sochy from 1 June 1943

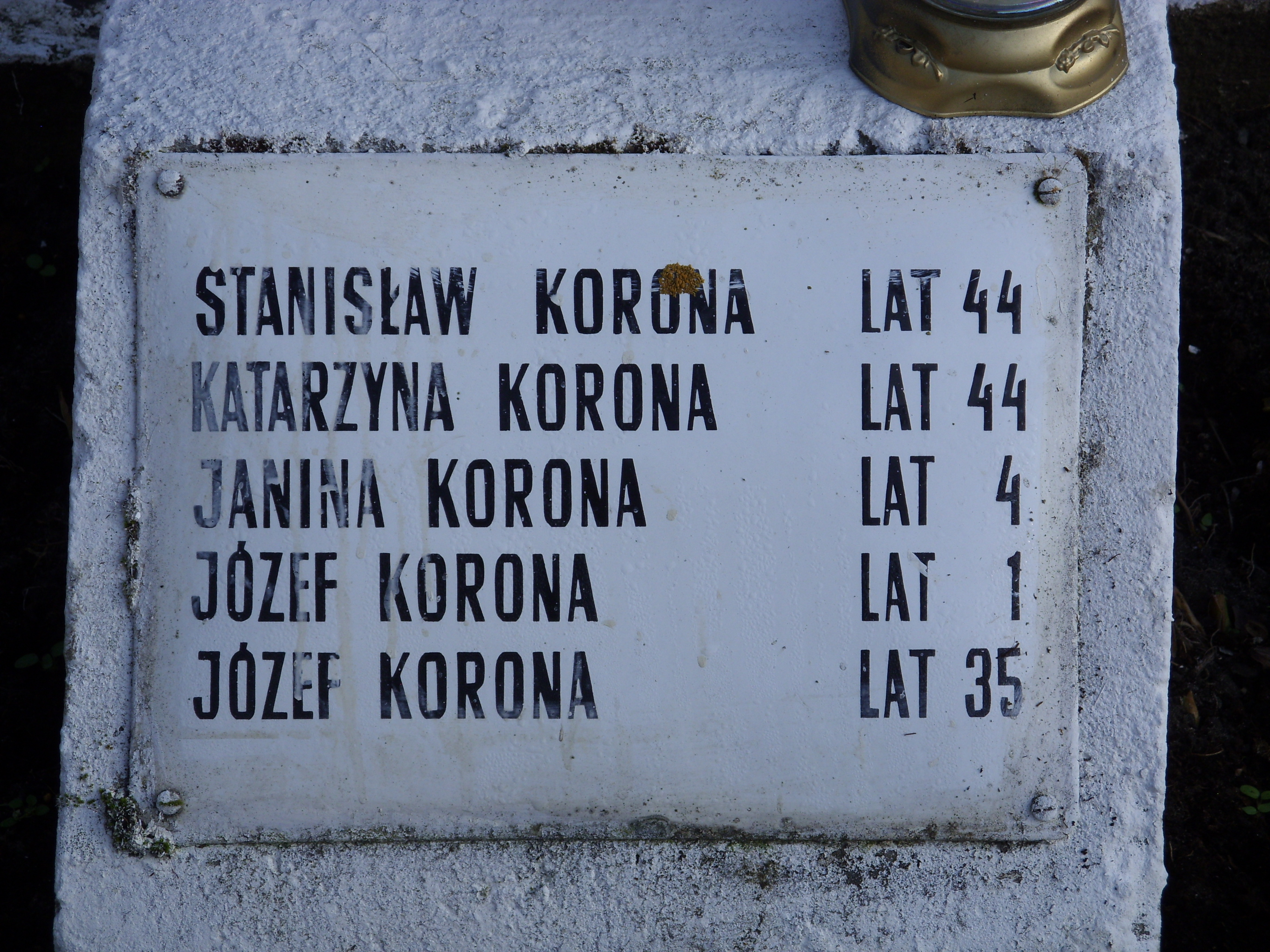
Polish civilians victims of the German Nazi massacre in Sochy Jozef Korona 1 year

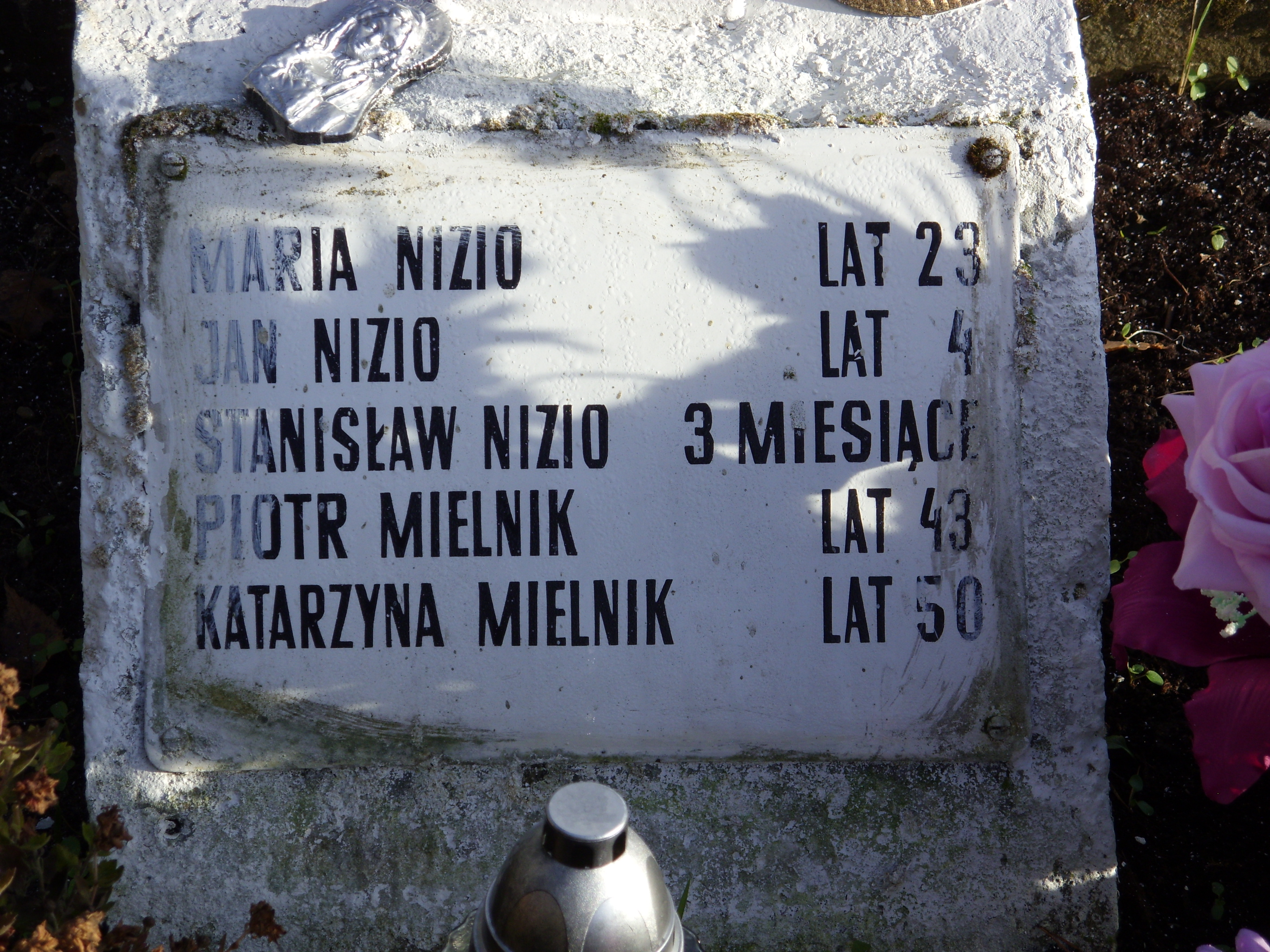
Polish civilians victims of the German Nazi massacre in Sochy, Stanislaw Nizio 3 months

== See also ==
- Ethnic cleansing of Zamojszczyzna by Nazi Germany
- Nazi crimes against the Polish nation
- Zamość uprising
- Katyn massacre
- Lidice
- Marzabotto massacre
- Oradour-sur-Glane massacre
- Sant'Anna di Stazzema massacre
- Distomo massacre
- Ochota massacre
- Wola massacre
