= Gmina Łabunie =

Gmina Łabunie Łabunie Commune
- Gmina
- Coat of arms
- Interactive map of Gmina Łabunie
- Coordinates (Łabunie): 50°40′0″N 23°22′0″E
- Country: Poland
- Voivodeship: Lublin
- County: Zamość County
- Seat: Łabunie

Area
  - Total: 87.48 km^{2} (33.78 sq mi)

Population (2013)
  - Total: 6,295
  - Density: 71.96/km^{2} (186.4/sq mi)
- Website: http://www.labunie.com.pl

Gmina Łabunie is a rural gmina (administrative district) in Zamość County, Lublin Voivodeship, in eastern Poland. Its seat is the village of Łabunie, which lies approximately 10 kilometres (6 mi) south-east of Zamość and 86 km (53 mi) south-east of the regional capital Lublin.

The gmina covers an area of 87.48 square kilometres (33.8 sq mi), and as of 2006 its total population is 6,257 (6,295 in 2013).

== Villages ==
Gmina Łabunie contains the villages and settlements of Barchaczów, Bródek, Dąbrowa, Łabunie, Łabunie-Reforma, Łabuńki Drugie, Łabuńki Pierwsze, Majdan Ruszowski, Mocówka, Ruszów, Ruszów-Kolonia, Wierzbie and Wólka Łabuńska.

== Neighbouring gminas ==
Gmina Łabunie is bordered by the gminas of Adamów, Komarów-Osada, Krynice, Sitno and Zamość.
