= Brodek u Prostějova =

- Market town
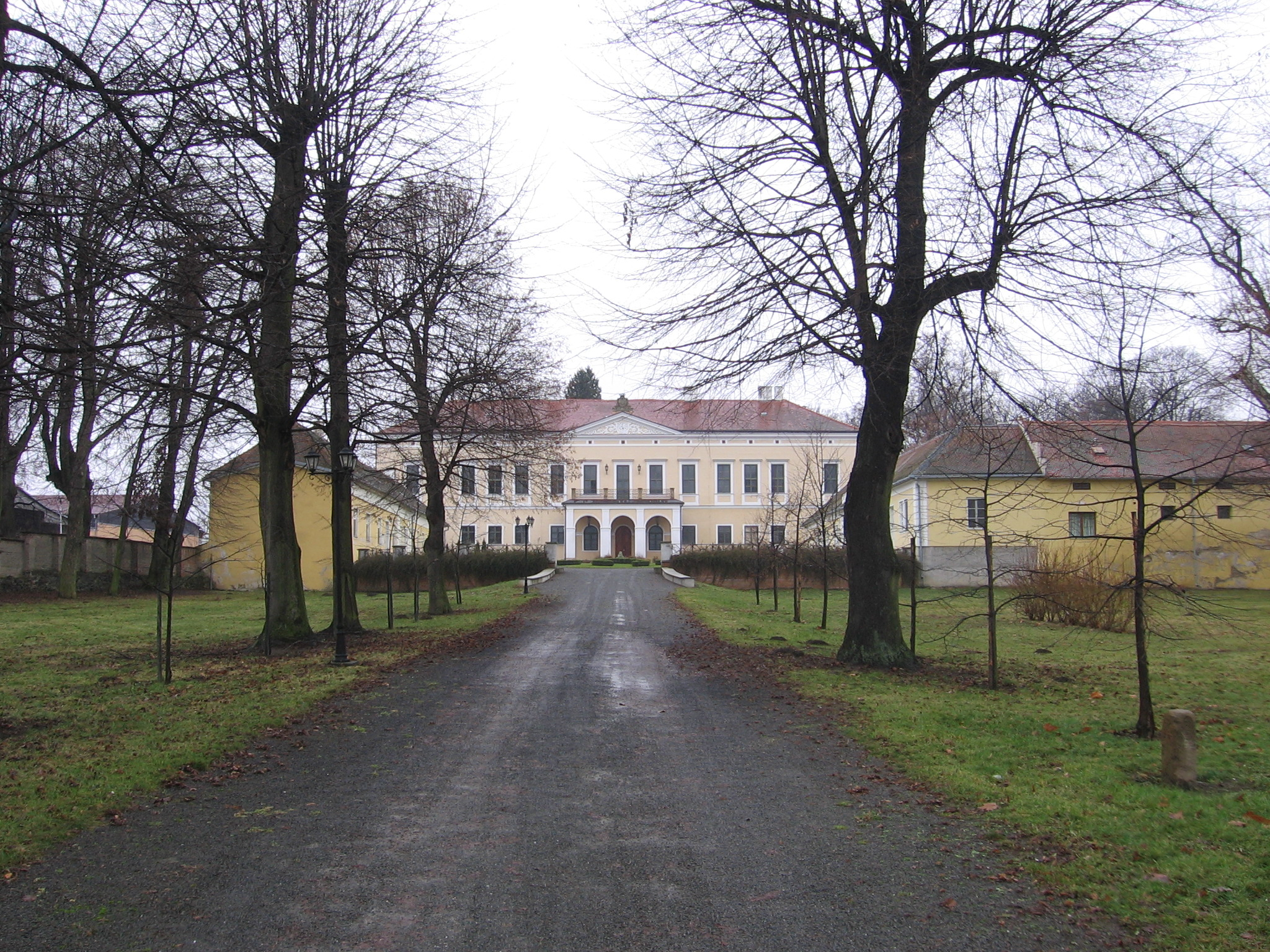
- Brodek u Prostějova Castle

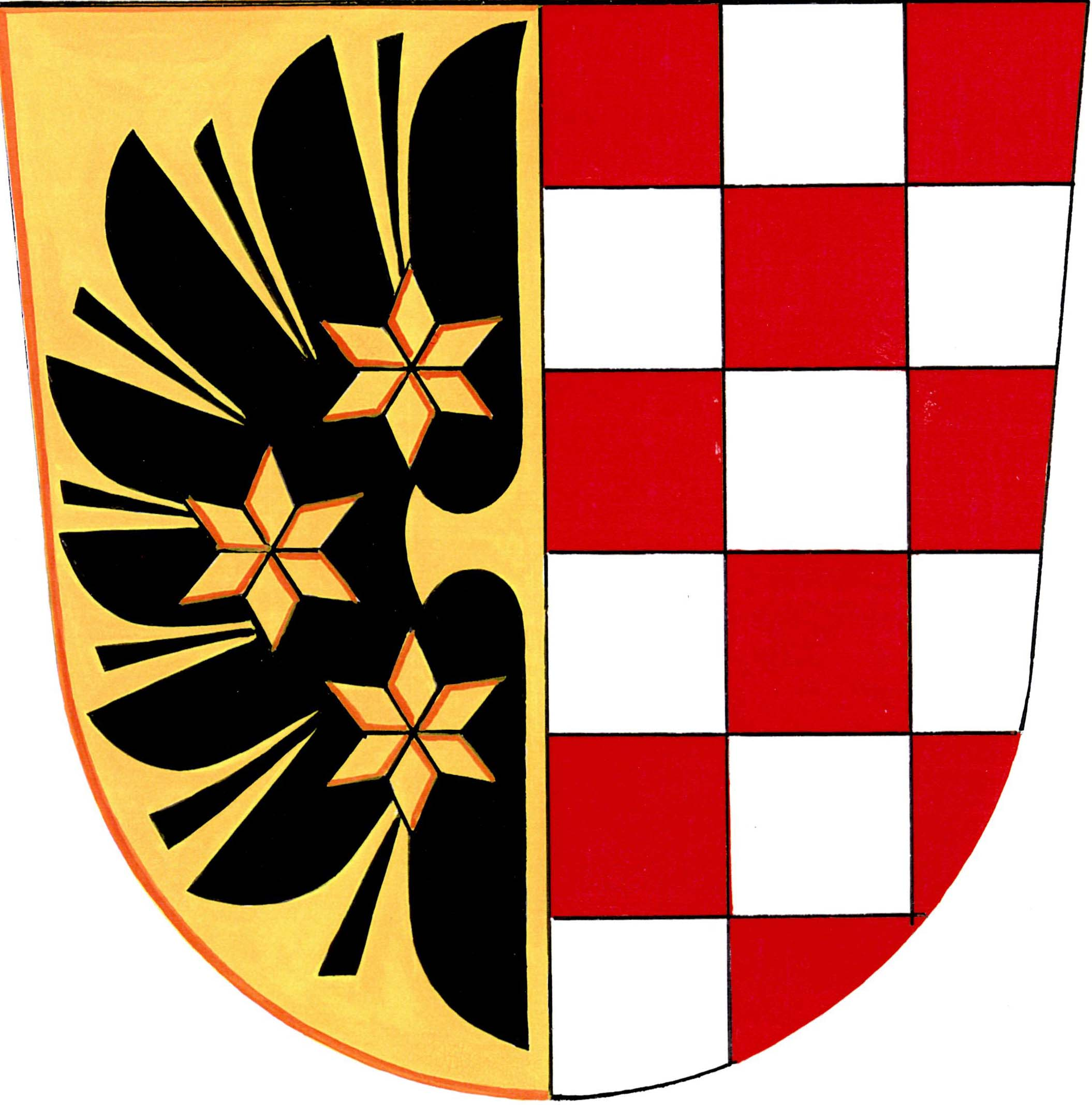
- Flag Coat of arms

- Location in the Czech Republic
- Coordinates: 49°22′12″N 17°5′24″E
- Country: Czech Republic
- Region: Olomouc
- District: Prostějov
- First mentioned: 1334

Area
  - Total: 6.11 km^{2} (2.36 sq mi)
- Elevation: 260 m (850 ft)

Population (2026-01-01)
  - Total: 1,450
  - Density: 237/km^{2} (615/sq mi)
- Time zone: UTC+1 (CET)
  - Summer (DST): UTC+2 (CEST)
- Postal code: 798 07
- Website: www.brodek.cz

Brodek u Prostějova (Czech pronunciation: [ˈbrodɛk ˈu proscɛjova]; German: Prödlitz) is a market town in Prostějov District in the Olomouc Region of the Czech Republic. It has about 1,500 inhabitants.

== Administrative division ==
Brodek u Prostějova consists of two municipal parts (in brackets population according to the 2021 census):

- Brodek u Prostějova (1,292)
- Sněhotice (126)

== Geography ==
Brodek u Prostějova is located about 12 kilometres (7 mi) south of Prostějov and 28 km (17 mi) southwest of Olomouc. It lies on the border between the Upper Morava Valley and Vyškov Gate. The western tip of the municipal territory extends into the Drahany Highlands and includes the highest point of Brodek u Prostějova at 319 m (1,047 ft) above sea level. The Brodečka stream flows through the market town.

== History ==
The first written mention of Brodek is from 1334. In the 14th century, the settlement was promoted to a market town. Brodek was destroyed by the Taborites during the Hussite Wars in 1430, and then by French army in 1805 and 1809 during the Napoleonic Wars, but it always recovered thanks to its convenient location on a busy road.

In 1960, Sněhotice was joined to Brodek u Prostějova.

== Demographics ==
Historical population

Year	Pop.	±%
1869	1,002	—
1880	1,208	+20.6%
1890	1,170	−3.1%
1900	1,173	+0.3%
1910	1,318	+12.4%

Year	Pop.	±%
1921	1,301	−1.3%
1930	1,460	+12.2%
1950	1,356	−7.1%
1961	1,354	−0.1%
1970	1,235	−8.8%

Year	Pop.	±%
1980	1,247	+1.0%
1991	1,270	+1.8%
2001	1,395	+9.8%
2011	1,450	+3.9%
2021	1,418	−2.2%

Source: Censuses

== Transport ==
The D46 motorway (part of the European route E462) from Olomouc to Vyškov runs through the municipal territory.

== Sights ==
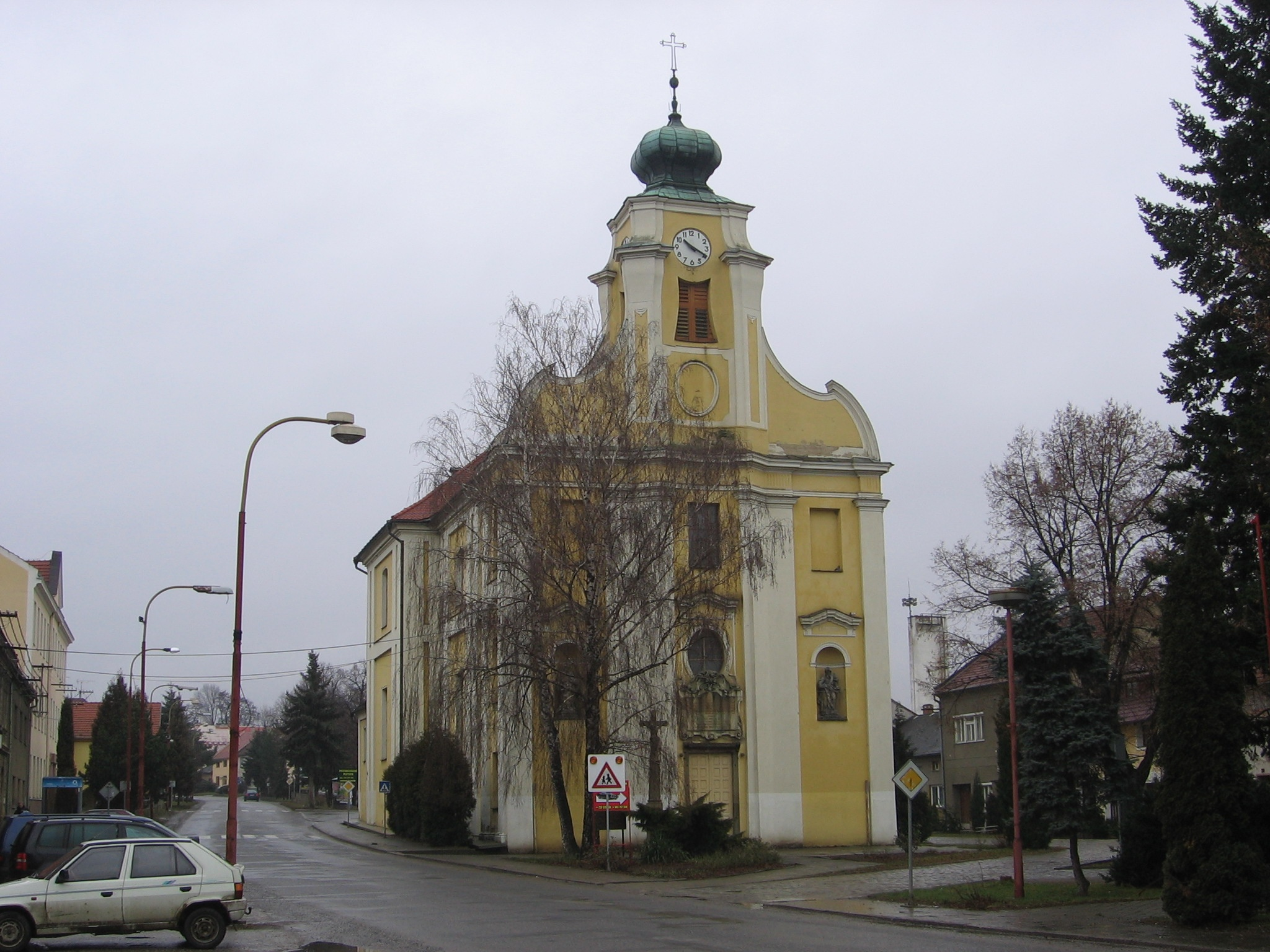
Church of the Exaltation of the Holy Cross

The main landmark of the market town is the Church of the Exaltation of the Holy Cross. It was built in the baroque style in 1726.

The Brodek u Prostějova Castle was built in the Renaissance style in the 1580s and then modified several times. Today it is privately owned.
