= Michniów massacre =

204 Polish civilians massacred by German police, SS in 1943

- Part of World War II
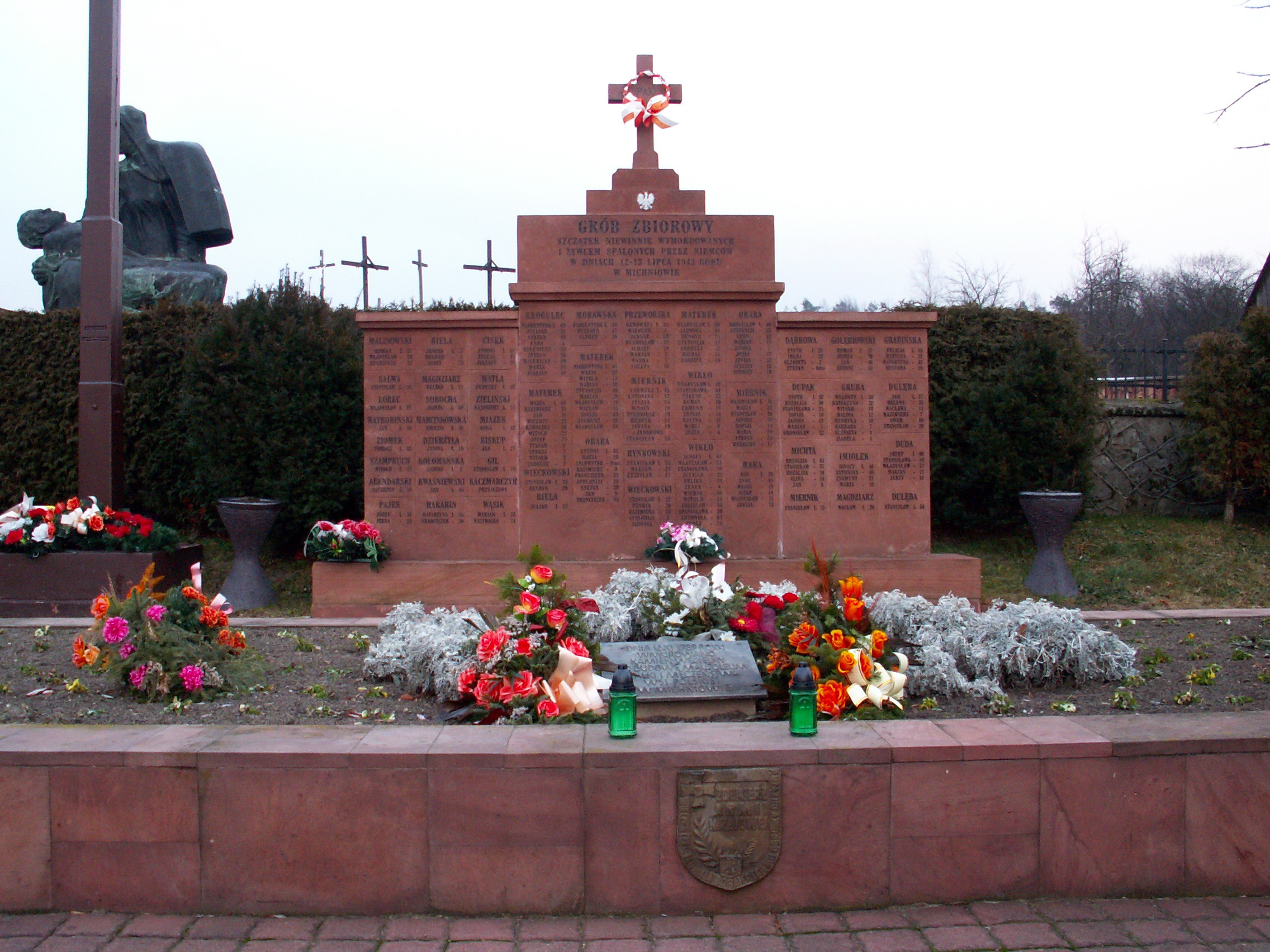
- Monument and mass grave of the victims of the Michniów massacre
- Location: Michniów, Świętokrzyskie Voivodeship, Poland
- Date: 12–13 July 1943
- Deaths: ~ 204 killed (among 48 children)
- Victim: Polish civilians
- Perpetrators: Nazi Germany, SS, Ordnungspolizei

Location Michniów (Świętokrzyskie Voivodeship) in Poland

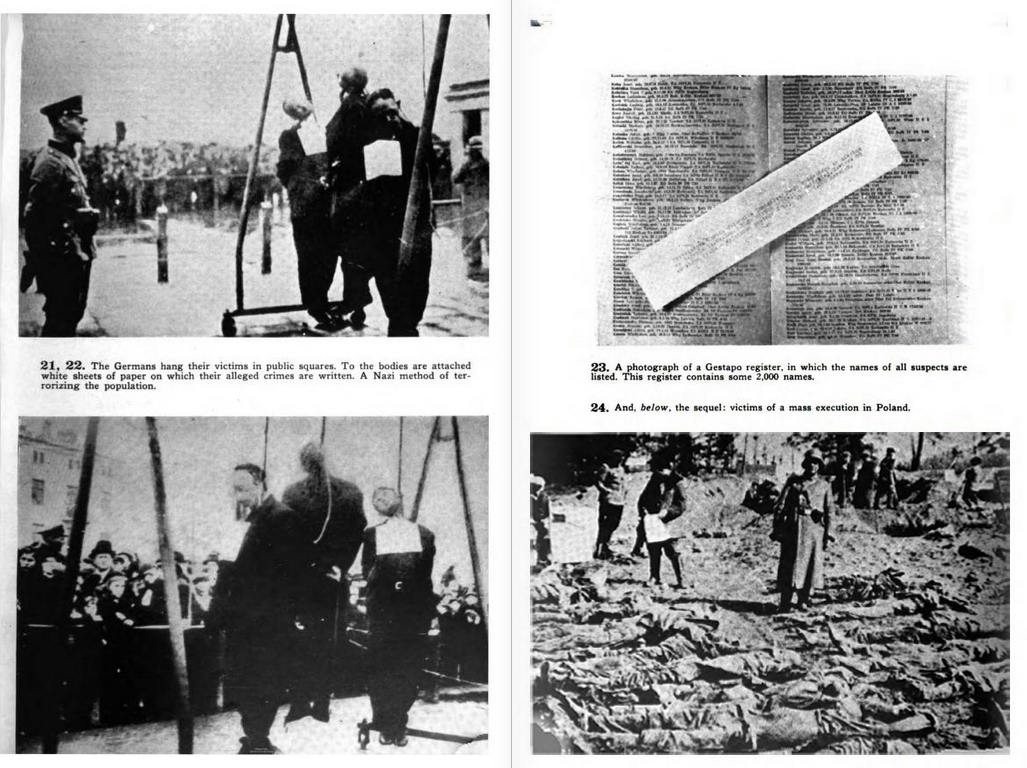
German atrocities in German-occupied Poland 1939–1945. The Black Book of Poland (21–24)

The Michniów massacre is a massacre that occurred on 12–13 July 1943 in the village of Michniów during the German occupation of Poland when approximately 204 of its inhabitants, including women and children, were massacred by German Ordnungspolizei and Schutzstaffel.

During World War II, the inhabitants of Michniów actively cooperated with the Polish resistance movement, in particular with the Świętokrzyskie Home Army units commanded by lieutenant Jan Piwnik, pseudonym "Ponury" ("Grim"), a cichociemny ("Silent Unseen" special-operations paratroopers of the Polish Army in exile in SOE). On July 12, 1943, a German military unit partially burned the village and murdered over 100 inhabitants. In retaliation that same night, Piwnik's partisans attacked the express train Kraków-Warsaw in the area of Podłazie, Skarżysko County, killing or injuring at least a dozen Germans. The next day, German Ordnungspolizei returned to Michniów, completely burning the village and murdering almost all Poles who lived there. In total, at least 204 people, including men (mostly burned alive), 54 women and 48 children, as many as ten of them were less than 10 years old, were victims of the massacres in Michniów. The youngest victim was a nine-day-old Stefanek Dąbrowa, thrown by a German military policeman into a burning barn. Occupational authorities forbade the reconstruction of the village and cultivation of surrounding fields. After the war, the Michniów massacre became a symbol of German crimes committed in Polish villages. Currently in Michniów there is the Mausoleum of Polish Rural Martyrology.

== Background ==
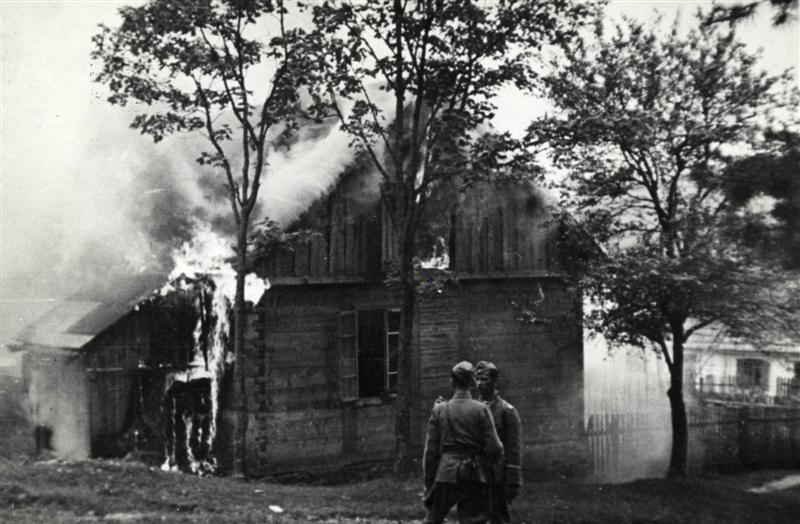
German policemen during the Michniów massacre. July 12, 1943

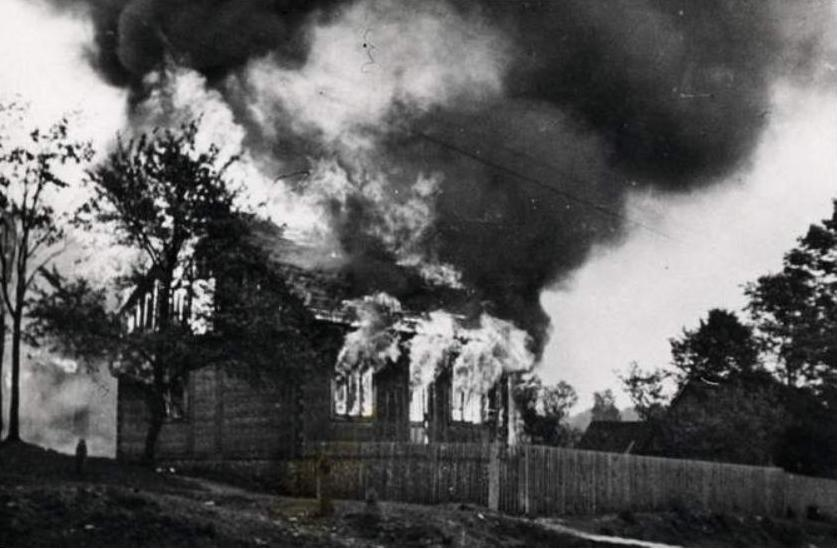
Michniów massacre by Nazi Germany. The fire house of Władysław Materk in Michniów

During World War II and the occupation of Poland by Nazi Germany (1939–1945), Poles were subjected to terror and mass German repression. Both in cities and in the villages. Hundreds of Polish villages were subjected to pacifications, massacres of people, executions of civilians, burning, often entire villages.

An incomplete list drawn up after World War II estimates the number of 299 such Polish villages destroyed by German occupiers, e.g. Rajsk, April 16, 1942 (142 murdered); Krasowo-Częstki, 17 July 1943 (259 murdered); Skłoby, 11 April 1940 (215 murdered); Michniów, 13 July 1943; Józefów, April 14, 1940 (169 murdered); Kitów, December 11, 1942 (174 murdered); Sumin, 29 January 1943 (118 murdered); Sochy, 1 June 1943 (181 murdered); Borów, 2 February 1944 (232 murdered); Łążek, February 2, 1944 (187 murdered); Szczecyn, 2 February 1944 (368); Jamy, Lublin Voivodeship, March 3, 1944 (147 murdered); Milejów, 6 September 1939 (150 murdered); Kaszyce, 7 March 1943 (117 murdered); Krusze, 31 August 1944 (158 murdered); Lipniak-Majorat, September 2, 1944 (370 murdered) and many others.

In the repressive actions of 1939–1945, the Germans murdered 19,792 people.

Michniów is located in the administrative district of Gmina Suchedniów, within Skarżysko County, Świętokrzyskie Voivodeship, in south-central Poland. From the east, south and north, the village is surrounded by dense forests. A road connecting Suchedniów with Bodzentyn runs through the village. During the German occupation, Michniów was inhabited by about 500 people. The village had nearly 80 farms (about 250 buildings). Due to the fact that the land there was not conducive to cultivation, many residents of Michniów were employed outside agriculture – felling forests or in the nearby factories of the Central Industrial Region (Poland).

Michniów has been known for patriotic traditions since the January Uprising. In September 1939, many men from Michniów fought in the ranks of the Polish Army. One of them, Józef Dulęba, took part in the Battle of Westerplatte. In the autumn of 1939, the inhabitants of Michniów provided assistance to the partisan units of Major Henryk Dobrzański, pseudonym "Hubal". The first resistance structures also quickly formed in the village. Coming from Michniów Hipolit Krogulec, pseudonym "Albiński" became one of the first organizers of the Union of Retaliation (Z.O.) in the Kielce Province. Over time, the number of the Z.O. cell in Michniów increased to around 10 members, and "Albiński" himself became the deputy commander of Z.O. in the Kielce District of the ZWZ. After the renaming of ZWZ into the Home Army (Armia Krajowa – AK), a secretive platoon formed under the code name "Forge" in Michniów. Władysław Krogulec became its commander, while Franciszek Brzeziński served as his deputy. On the eve of pacification, more than 40 village residents were sworn members of the Home Army. The inhabitants of Michniów also supported partisans from the People's Guard unit of the Kielce region (commander: Ignacy Robb aka "Narbutt"). The village population also provided aid to Soviet prisoners of war who had escaped from the camps.

In early 1943, the Union of Retaliation was transformed into the Kedyw, a special unit dedicated to sabotage and diversion. Lieutenant Hipolit Krogulec was appointed the first commander of district Kedyw. Meanwhile, in November 1942, the Home Army command transferred three Cichociemni ("Silent Unseen") to Kielce, entrusting them with the task of strengthening local diversion structures. They were: Waldemar Szwiec pseudonym "Robot", lieutenant Eugeniusz Kaszyński pseudonym "Nurt" and lieutenant Antoni Jastrzębski pseudonym "Ugór" ("Fallow"). On the basis of the Home Army branch in Michniów, they soon organized the first combat patrol of Kedyw in the Kielce District of the Home Army. At first, the Cichociemni were quartered in Ostojów, and then moved to Michniów. The contact place was organized in the house of railwayman Władysław Materek, because due to his profession he could successfully act as a liaison. The Materek family also ran a small shop and an illegal butcher's shop, part of which was transferred to the partisans. Other residents of Michniów also actively cooperated with the patrol of Kedyw, among them Władysław Malinowski (served as a liaison) and the Daniłłowski family displaced from Greater Poland (real name Fagasińscy). Even a gunsmith and a repair workshop for weapons and equipment were organized in the village.

In late spring 1943, events took place that had a decisive impact on the further activity of the resistance movement in the Kielce region. In mid-May 1943 another Cichociemni was moved to the Kielce District of the Home Army, lieutenant Jan Piwnik, pseudonym "Ponury" (in English: "Grim" or "Gloomy"). On June 4, 1943, he officially took over the duties of district commander of Kedyw, while lieutenant Hipolit Krogulec served as deputy. In a short time, "Ponury" organized a strong guerrilla unit in the forests around Wykus hill. At the beginning of summer of 1943, the Home Army units led by "Ponury" already had about 200 soldiers. The first engagement against the German occupiers took place on July 2, 1943, when the partisans attacked two fast trains on the Warsaw-Kraków line (the attacks were carried out near the Łączna and Berezów railway stops).

Meanwhile, from February 1943, the German authorities exacerbated terror in the rural areas of the Radom district. The pacification operations mainly covered the central part of the district, between the Vistula river and Pilica (river) (pre-war poviats: Włoszczowa County, Końskie County, Kielce County, and the southern part of Sandomierz County). A number of crimes against the population of the Kielce region were committed in particular by the 62nd motorized gendarmerie platoon, commanded by German lieutenant Albert Schuster. Individual and mass executions were also carried out by other SS units and the German police. The pacifications and massacre of Skałka Polska (May 11, 1943), Strużki (June 3, 1943) and Bór Kunowski (July 4, 1943) were particularly bloody. The culmination of the terror campaign, was the massacre in Michniów.

Michniów's pacification was prepared very carefully by the Germans. After the war, it was established that the plan of the criminal expedition was discussed at a special meeting in Radom (July 8, 1943). However, it is not entirely clear what the origin of the decision to pacify Michniów was. It is known that the Gestapo had a list of villagers suspected of cooperating with the resistance movement. It contained details of suspects, such as name and date of birth. Even before the end of the war, the village tragedy began to be associated with the person of lieutenant Jerzy Wojnowski pseudonym "Motor" – a formidable German informer located in the partisan unit of lieutenant Jan Piwnik. Cezary Chlebowski (researcher of the history of the Home Army, author of the Pozdrówcie Góry Świętokrzyskie, eng. "Greet the Świętokrzyskie Mountains") was convinced that the reports of "Motor" caused the pacification of Michniów. Longin Kaczanowski, without diminishing the significance of the betrayal of "Motor," pointed out that it is unlikely that German action would be caused by the denunciations of only one informer - in addition, visiting the village relatively sporadically. In his opinion, the Germans managed to work out the underground network in Michniów also thanks to reports of other agents - e.g. a certain Twardowski from Orzechówka and volksdeutsch Jekla from Zagnańsk (forester who led the Germans along forest roads to Michniów on the night of 11/12 July). According to Kaczanowski, it is also possible that the cooperation of the residents of Michnik with the resistance movement was only an excuse to burn the village and kill its inhabitants.

== Massacre on July 12 ==
On Sunday, July 11, 1943, cars stopped at the edge of Michniów, from which several German officers got off. Witnesses mentioned that the Germans thoroughly surveyed the village and the surrounding area, and behaved extremely politely towards the inhabitants.

On the night of Sunday to Monday Michniów was surrounded by a double chain of German posts. The inner lap ring was closed directly around the village. In turn, the outposts forming the outer ring were located on the edge of the forests (surrounding the village from three sides), as well as on the hill west of Michniów. The Germans also manned both inlets of the road from Suchedniów to Bodzentyn. Dozens of men, going to work early in the morning in nearby factories or felling trees, were detained and gathered at the edge of the forest. The Germans subjected the detainees to a thorough search and then ordered them to lie face down on a nearby forest road. The same applies to women going to work. Several inhabitants tried to sneak out of the village imperceptibly, but all were stopped by German posts.

The Germans entered Michniów about an hour after closing the lap. Men and boys were brutally dragged out of their homes, beating them and abusing them. Germans quickly began to kill people in the village. The first to die were brothers Antoni and Jan Gołębiowski, who were shot by German policemen while marching to the assembly point. A moment later, on the so-called running out near the local school, 18 men were lined up. The Germans thoroughly checked the details of the detainees, and then shot 17 men in the back of the head. Only Józef Dupak avoided execution. A German officer allowed him to leave, because he considered that the man's hands, damaged by hard work, were "proof" that he could not have anything to do with the guerilla. The remaining men from Michniów were gathered at the bend of the road running through the village. There, on the basis of a list by name, the read persons were called in. During this procedure, 18-year-old Walerian Krogulec was shot, who, according to a German officer, responded too slowly (the man was moving slowly due to disability). The other men had to stand in line, awaiting the decision of the Germans. At the slightest signs of movement, they were brutally beaten.

After some time, the men read from the list were divided into several groups and driven to four barns located in the southern part of the village – belonging to Władysław Dulęba, Wawrzyniec Gil, Antoni Grabiński and joint Bolesław Biela and Władysław Wątrobiński. A group of men detained in the morning at the edge of the forest (their names were also on the proscription list) was brought to the latter building. Dozens of men locked in Grabiński's barn managed to open the gate and get outside, but German policemen surrounded them in a semi-circle, then pushing back with rifle butts and pushed them back into the building. Victims crammed into barns, the Germans shelled and threw grenades at them, then set fire to the buildings. Most of the victims probably burned alive

Village residents were also murdered on other farms. The gamekeeper Władysław Wikło, who cooperates with the underground, was taken with his family to the buildings of Teofil Materek. There, one after another, the gamekeeper Władysław Wikło was shot, his five children (16-year-old Roman, 14-year-old Zofia, 11-year-old Halina, 8-year-old Maria, 5-year-old Józef), and finally his wife, Stanisława Wikło. Then the farm was set on fire, and the corpses of the Gołębiewski brothers who had already been murdered were thrown into the fire. The Germans also thoroughly searched the farm of Władysław Materk. The host was earlier taken to Antoni Grabiński's barn and murdered there. His wife Jadwiga was stabbed with bayonets during the search. Then, under the false pretext that a shot was fired from the house towards German officers, the buildings were set on fire. Materk's son, Henryk, was shot dead when he escaped from a burning house.

That day, the Germans murdered 102 residents of Michniów – including 95 men (aged 16 to 63), two women (44 and 48 years) and five children (aged 5 to 15). All women and children died from bullet or bayonet pushes. In turn, 23 men were shot and the others died in the arched barns. The Germans completely burned down the farms of Teofil Materek and Władysław Materek and Władysław Wikło, as well as four barns that served as a place of execution. In addition, a dozen other buildings were to burn down, which caught fire from buildings set on fire by the Germans. Germans had robbed livestock and all valuable items from burned farms.

When leaving the village, the Germans abducted 28 people with them. 10 Poles suspected of cooperating with the underground were taken to the police barracks at ul. Leśna in Kielce. This group includes: Piotr Charaszymowicz aka Charasymowicz (a resident of Jędrów), Kazimierz Krogulec, Władysław Krogulec, Antoni Materek, Bogdan Materek, Jan Materek, Teofil Materek, Zofia Materek (wife of Teofil), as well as Feliks Daniłłowski vel Fagasiński and his wife Władysława. In turn, 18 young women and girls were put at the disposal of the Kielce "Arbeitsamt" (in English: "Employment Office" in German Third Reich). Those arrested included 12 people who were sent to German concentration camps and 18 women who were taken away for forced labor.

The day after the pacification, the commander of the Sicherheitsdienst and security police unit in Kielce, SS-Hauptsturmführer Karl Essig, sent a telegraphy to Radom with a brief description of the action. This report was formulated cautiously and contained a number of misrepresentations. SS Karl Essig reported that "while combing the area with police forces 56 people were suspected of banditry. Most of those shot come from Michniów. While exploring the village, various objects burned because people who tried to resist hid there".

== The retaliation of the Polish Resistance ==
The news about the start of the massacre in Michniów reached the soldiers of Jan Piwnik, nickname "Ponury" in their base on the hill "Wykus". The lieutenant Jan Piwnik immediately picked up his unit to the rescue, but the German criminal expedition left Michniów before the arrival of the partisans. The village tragedy caused a great stir and regret in the guerrilla unit of Jan Piwnik. Many soldiers came from Michniów; many others had cordial relations with its inhabitants.

Lieutenant Jan Piwnik ("Grim") decided to conduct immediate retaliation. Later that evening, Home Army soldiers captured the nearby block post Podłazie and occupied the local section of the Warsaw-Kraków railway line. From the Polish railwaymen detained at the station, "Grim", he received information that a German holiday train was going to Kraków in this direction, carrying soldiers returning from the Eastern Front. The Grim's unit set up an ambush. However, the explosive charge on the tracks turned out to be defective and the train went away.

Polish railwaymen informed then that at 2:40 a fast train from Kraków to Warsaw would travel the same route. When the train approached the station, the guerrillas stopped it using a semaphore, then stormed the wagons of "Nur für Deutsche" (in English: "For Germans only"). There was a fierce battle in which at least a dozen Germans were killed or wounded. Polish losses were limited to five wounded. On the walls of the captured wagons, partisans engraved the inscriptions "Za Michniów" (in English: "For Michniów"). In the morning, "Grim", expecting a German chase, organized an ambush near Michniów. However, the Germans did not appear, so after about two hours the lieutenant ended the ambush and withdrew his unit to "Wykus" hill.

== Massacre on July 13 ==
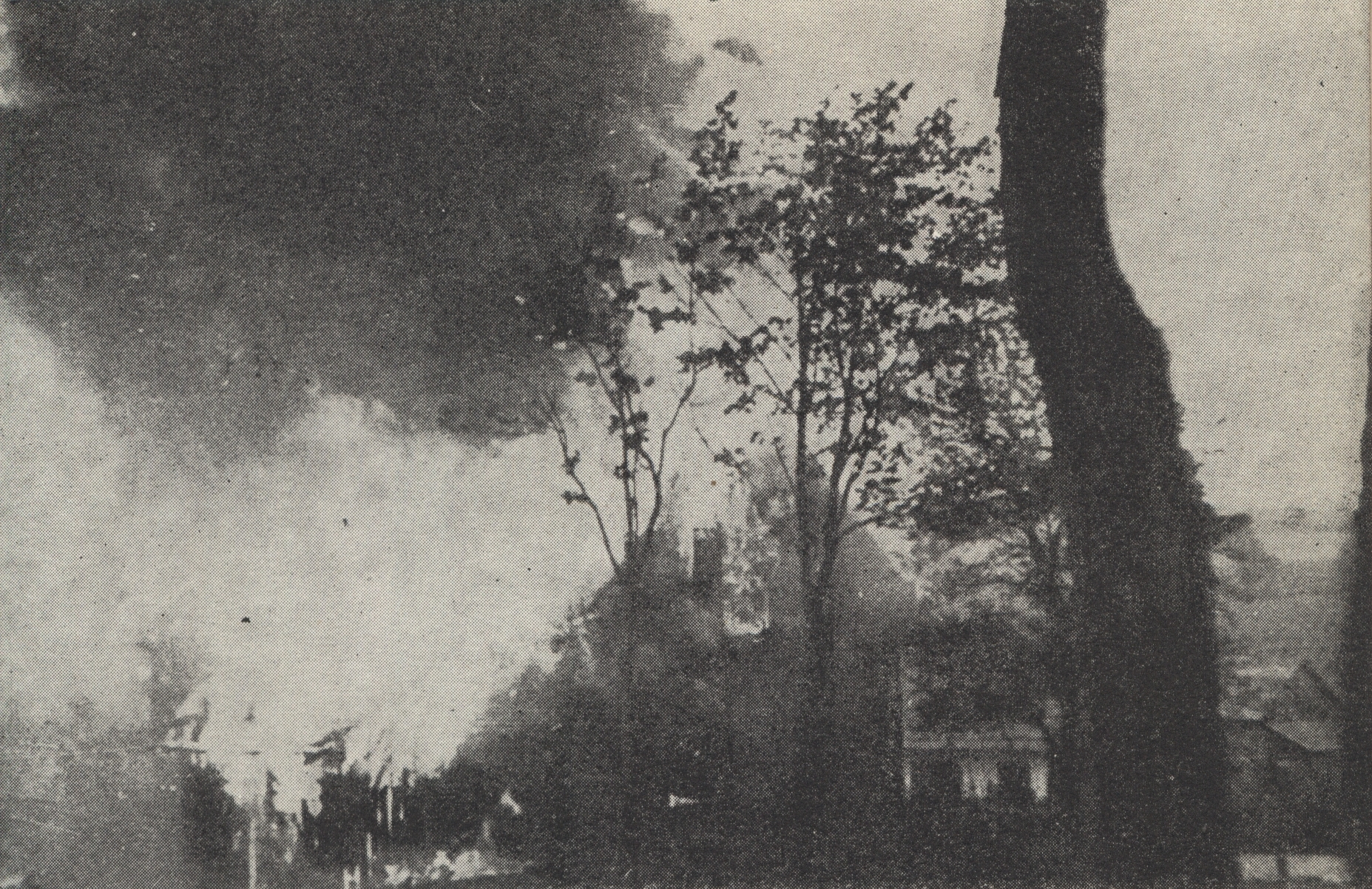
Michniów massacre by Nazi Germany. Burning of village Michniów

Meanwhile, on July 13, in the early morning, trucks filled with police officers appeared on the road connecting Kielce with Skarżysko-Kamienna. The German column came from Kielce and stopped near Ostojów. There, the policemen formed a tyraliery and then headed towards Michniów. The Germans also took a hill west of the village and opened fire on the buildings. At the same time, a second group of policemen, passing to the edge of the forest, blocked the village from Suchedniów. At the very end, the Germans cut off the escape route from Wzdół Rządowy.

At night, at the news of the retaliatory attack of partisans, many residents of Michniów fled their homes for fear of further repression of the occupier. At least a dozen people also managed to get into the forest after the start of the German attack – before the Germans surrounded the village. However, about 120 inhabitants remained in Michniów. Some women and children gave up escaping because it was expected that, as on the first day of pacification, repression would be targeted primarily at men suspected of cooperating with the resistance

Meanwhile, after reaching the village, the Germans began a systematic massacre. The buildings were thoroughly searched. Germans killed inhabitants regardless of age and gender. Many Poles were shot in the fields, roads and courtyards. Usually, the victims were driven to the buildings, where they were murdered using grenades and machine guns. The buildings were completely burnt after fire. There were cases when captured Poles, including women and children, were thrown into the fire alive. The youngest victim of the massacre was baby 9-day Stefan Dąbrowa. On that day, the boy's grandmother and his godmother took the baby to the church in Wzdół Rządowy, where he was baptized (the boy's mother, Irena Dąbrowa, remained in the village because she felt bad after childbirth; his father, Piotr Dąbrowa, died on the first day of pacification). The women returning from Wzdół Rządowy were herded with child to one of the barns and burned alive. The boy's mother and his older sister also died in the same massacre.

On July 13, 1943, 102 Poles were murdered in Michniów – including 7 men, 52 women and 43 children. About 20 people survived the pacification. The Germans ordered sixteen inhabitants, including four children, to rush animals looted by the occupiers to the forest north of the village, where the animals were loaded onto trucks and taken to Suchedniów, and from there rushed to Kielce. Initially, the Germans made preparations for the execution of the sixteen, but eventually allowed them to leave. They also released the widow of the Szczepański's (forester) and her brother and sister. Several people managed to survive the execution or hide from the torturers. The village was completely burnt down – only the stone barn of the forester Malinowski survived and the forester's lodge located off the beaten track.

== Aftermath ==
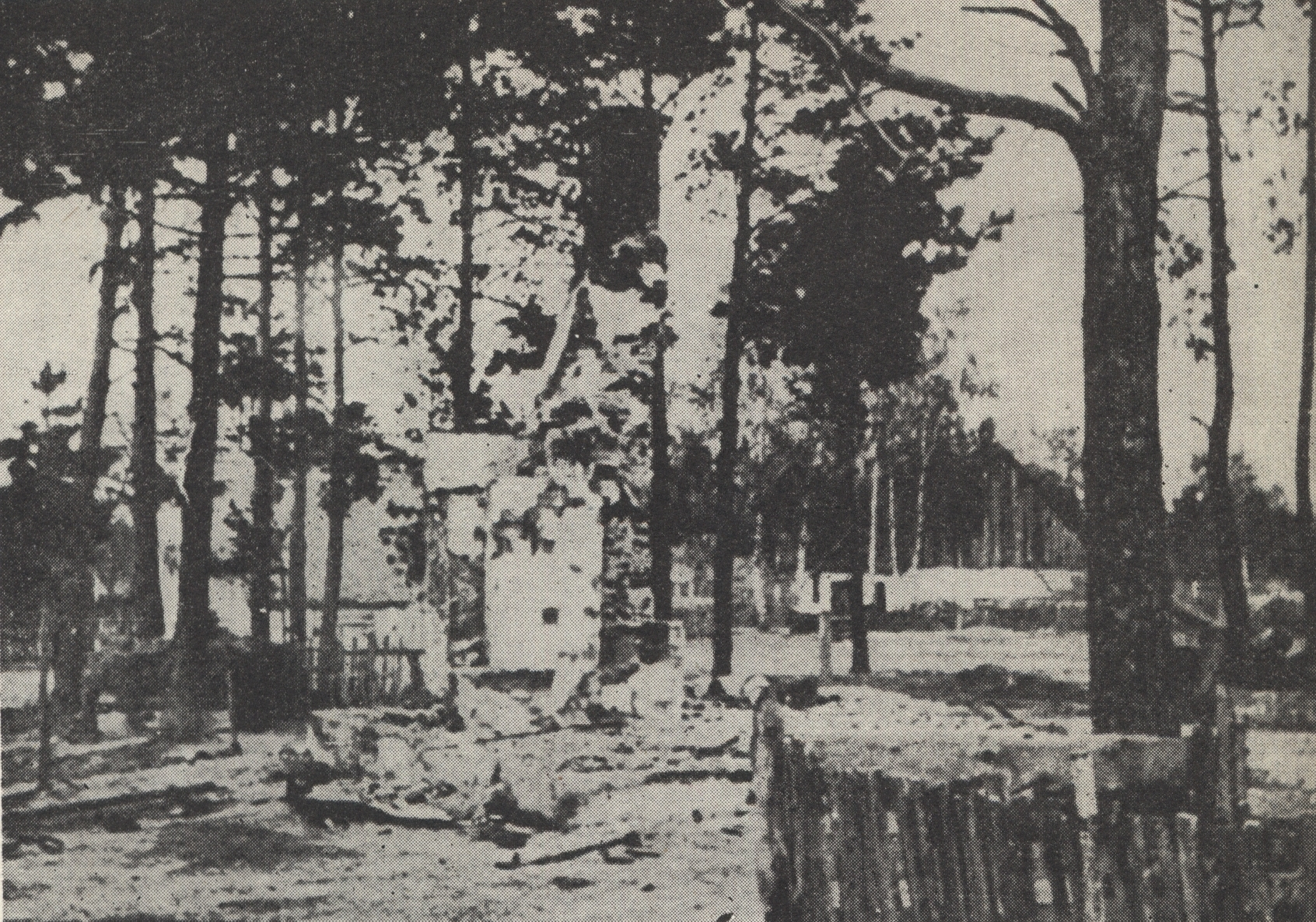
Ruins of Michniów after massacre

On July 15, 1943, the inhabitants of neighboring villages buried the remains of the murdered Michałów residents in a common grave excavated on a plot near the school. The Germans agreed to the burial of the victims. However, they ordered the tomb to be plowed and they did not allow the grave to be marked with a cross or other mark.

A few days after the pacification of Michniów, scouts from the Gray Ranks erected two boards with German inscriptions at the Warsaw-Kraków railway tracks. The first table had the inscription Deutsche Katyń (English: "German Katyn"), and the second: Waffen SS haben hier in Dorf Michniów 200 Männen, Frauen und Kinder ermordet uns dises Dorf verbant (in English: "Waffen SS murdered in Michniów village 200 men, women and children, and the village burnt down").

The Germans forbade the reconstruction of the village and cultivation of the surrounding fields. The survivors of Michniów were treated as outlaws. After the war, no written order could be found in this matter, but according to Polish historians, a number of evidence shows that such orders were issued. The mayors of the surrounding villages were forbidden to help the survivors, and the Michniów area was intensively patrolled by the German military police. Two days after the pacification, Wiktor Wikło was arrested in Skarżysko-Kamienna. A few days after the pacification, the Germans murdered another villager, Ignacy Wikło. In turn, on August 17, 1943, a German patrol shot Stefania Materek, trying with her husband and son to collect crops from one of the fields in Michałów (for fear of Germany, the local priest did not allow the victims to be buried at the Bodzentyn parish cemetery). Adolf Materk's family from Michniów was also one step away from death. After pacification, Materek, together with his mother and five children, settled in Wzdół Rządowy, where on September 14, 1943, they were stopped by a German military police. Materek's family was taken to Bodzentyn, where they were to be shot. However, the life of the family was saved by an officer of the Polish blue police, who not only persuaded the stay of execution to be done in Germany, but even managed to obtain the release of the victims.

10 people arrested on the first day of pacification were subjected to heavy investigation. Władysław Krogulec managed to get out of the prison in Kielce, for whose release the underground resistance movement paid a bribe of 20,000 złoty. After a few months, the Germans transported the remaining nine detainees to Auschwitz. Wiktor Wikło, who was arrested after pacification, was also sent to the same camp. Only three residents of Michałów survived their stay in the Nazi concentration camps (Bogdan Materek, Zofia Materek and Kazimierz Krogulec). A slightly different fate happened to young women and girls, detained on July 12, 1943. Wacława Materek was employed as a domestic help at the house of a German police officer, Gustaw Biel. The remaining 17 women were deported to forced labor in Germany.

== Victims ==
The latest research on the number of victims of the Michniów pacification, conducted by Ewa Kołomańska, found that on July 12–13, 1943, 204 residents of Michniów were murdered – including 102 men, 54 women and 48 children (aged from 9 days to 15 years). Slightly different numbers can be found in older sources. All victims were of Polish nationality. 11 families were completely murdered. Post-war censuses indicated that the names "Imiołek" and "Dąbrowa" were no longer found among the inhabitants of Michniów.

The victims of pacification include two people shot after the end of the German action, as well as seven people murdered in Nazi concentration camps. It is also possible that among those murdered on July 12–13, 1943, there were unrecognized people who were not permanent residents of Michniów - i.e. exiles settled there from the Polish areas annexed by Nazi Germany, or who accidentally found themselves in the pacification village. According to Longin Kaczanowski, the number of unrecognized victims of pacification can reach 20 people. Other sources say that up to 265 people could have died in Michniów. In addition, the fate of two Michnians – teacher Helena Głodzik and maid Józefa Bandura – remains unclear to this day.

== Perpetrators ==
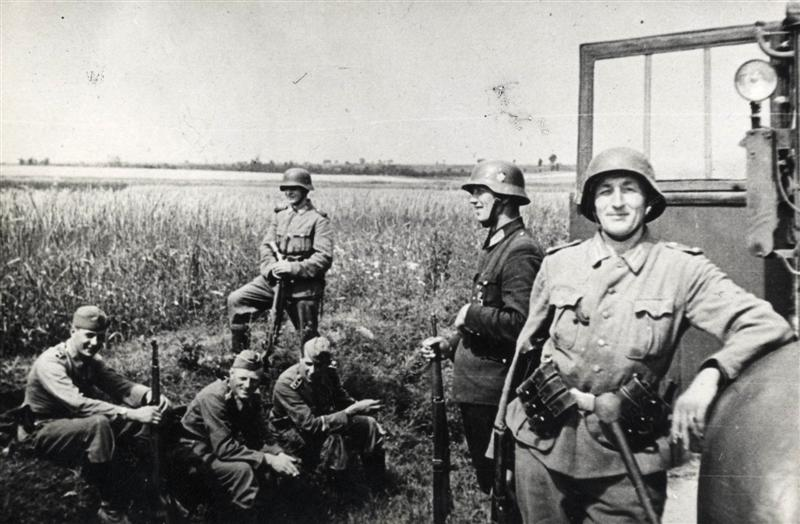
German gendarmerie on the way to Polish village Michniów. On 12–13 July 1943 German occupants completely destroyed Michniów and massacred 204 its inhabitants

The order to pacify of Michniów was probably issued by the commander of the SD and security police in Kielce, SS-Hauptsturmführer Karl Essig. At least several Sicherheitspolizei officers reporting to him were present in the village during the action on July 12, 1943. Witnesses of the pacification recognized, among others SS-Surmscharführer Wolfgang Rehn and SS-Sturmscharführer Otto Büssig. SS-Oberscharführer Franz Kautzky, SS-Hauptscharführer Otto vel Josef Göhring and SS-Surmscharführer Willy vel Rudolf Hintze participated in the escorting and brutal interrogation of Michniów's inhabitants. According to some sources, SS-Hauptsturmführer Adolf Feucht, an officer of the German security police, was responsible for a number of repressive actions in the Radom district.

The German Sicherheitspolizei gave orders for the massacre. The massacre was carried out by the hands of officers of the German police (German: Ordnungspolizei) – serving both in units of protective police (Schutzpolizei), as well as in units operating in rural German gendarmerie. It was established that policemen from the 3rd Battalion of the 17th Protective Police Regiment (in particular his 2nd company), as well as officers from various subunits of the 2nd Battalion of the 22nd Police Regiment participated in the Michnów massacre. It is to the barracks of the last battalion, located in the building of the former women's gymnasium at ul. Leśna in Kielce, 10 residents of Michniów were detained on the first day of pacification. Among the perpetrators of the pacification of Michniów were, among others: Adalbert Mayer (2nd company of the 3rd Battalion of the 17th Police Regiment), Lieutenant Gustaw Biel, Lieutenant Wilhelm Gosewisch (Adjutant of the 3rd Battalion of the 17th Police Regiment), Rottwachmeister of the Otto Rode Reserve (2nd Company of the 3rd Battalion of the 17th Police Regiment) and reserve wachmeister Otto Bromberg (5th company of the 2nd Battalion of the 17th Police Regiment).

German gendarmes from Kielce, Skarżysko-Kamienna, Ostrowiec Świętokrzyski, Starachowice, and Częstochowa also took part in the pacification of Michniów. Gendarmerie sub-units were commanded by Captain Gerulf Mayer – commander of the Kielce Gendarmerie Hauptmannschaft. Witnesses recognized Mayer as an officer who on July 12, 1943, was present at the execution of 17 men near the school in Michałów, and also supervised the burning of victims in barns. Leo Metz, commandant of the gendarmerie post in Skarżysko-Kamienna was also seen in the village. Contrary to the information given in some sources, it was not possible to confirm that the motorized platoon of the gendarmerie, commanded by Lieutenant Schuster, participated in the pacification of Michniów.

=== The fate of perpetrators ===
The Michnów massacre case was relatively widely discussed during the post-war trial of the SS and Police Commander in the Radom District, SS-Brigadeführer Herbert Böttcher. Böttcher's trial took place in Radom in 1949. The accused was found guilty of the alleged offenses and sentenced to death (the sentence was carried out in 1950). The topic of Michniów's pacification was also discussed in the margins of the trial of SS-Sturmscharführer and criminal secretary Otto Büssig, pending in Kielce in 1949. During the trial a list of 21 persons signed by the accused was presented, who were shot in Michniów on July 13, 1943, "during an attempt to escape". Büssig was sentenced to death and executed. Julius Hein, another participant in the pacification, was sentenced to death and executed.

In 1969, gendarmerie captain Gerulf Mayer appeared in court in Graz, Austria. The case of Michniów's pacification was not included in the indictment. Finally, the court found that the captain was to blame for the liquidation of the Jewish ghettos in Chmielnik and Chęciny and the pacification of Skałka Polska. Mayer was sentenced to 11 years in heavy prison, which was reduced to 10 years on appeal.

Some participants of Michniów's pacification died during the war. This group included, among others Leo Metz (liquidated by the Polish resistance movement at the end of 1944), as well as SS-Hauptsturmführer Adolf Feucht and SS-Hauptscharführer Otto vel Josef Göhring (they died in 1945). Many others – among others SS-Hauptsturmführer Karl Essig – however, did not bear any responsibility for their crimes.

Treason of Second Lieutenant Jerzy Wojnowski pseudonym "Motor" came out less than half a year after the pacification of Michniów. Confident was executed on January 28, 1944, in Milejowice. The fate of the Twardowski confidant from Orzechówka is unknown.

In 1970, Schuster was arrested in East Germany after an investigation by Polish officials. In 1973, he was found guilty of war crimes and crimes against humanity, and sentenced to death. Schuster was executed on 31 May 1973.

== Memory ==
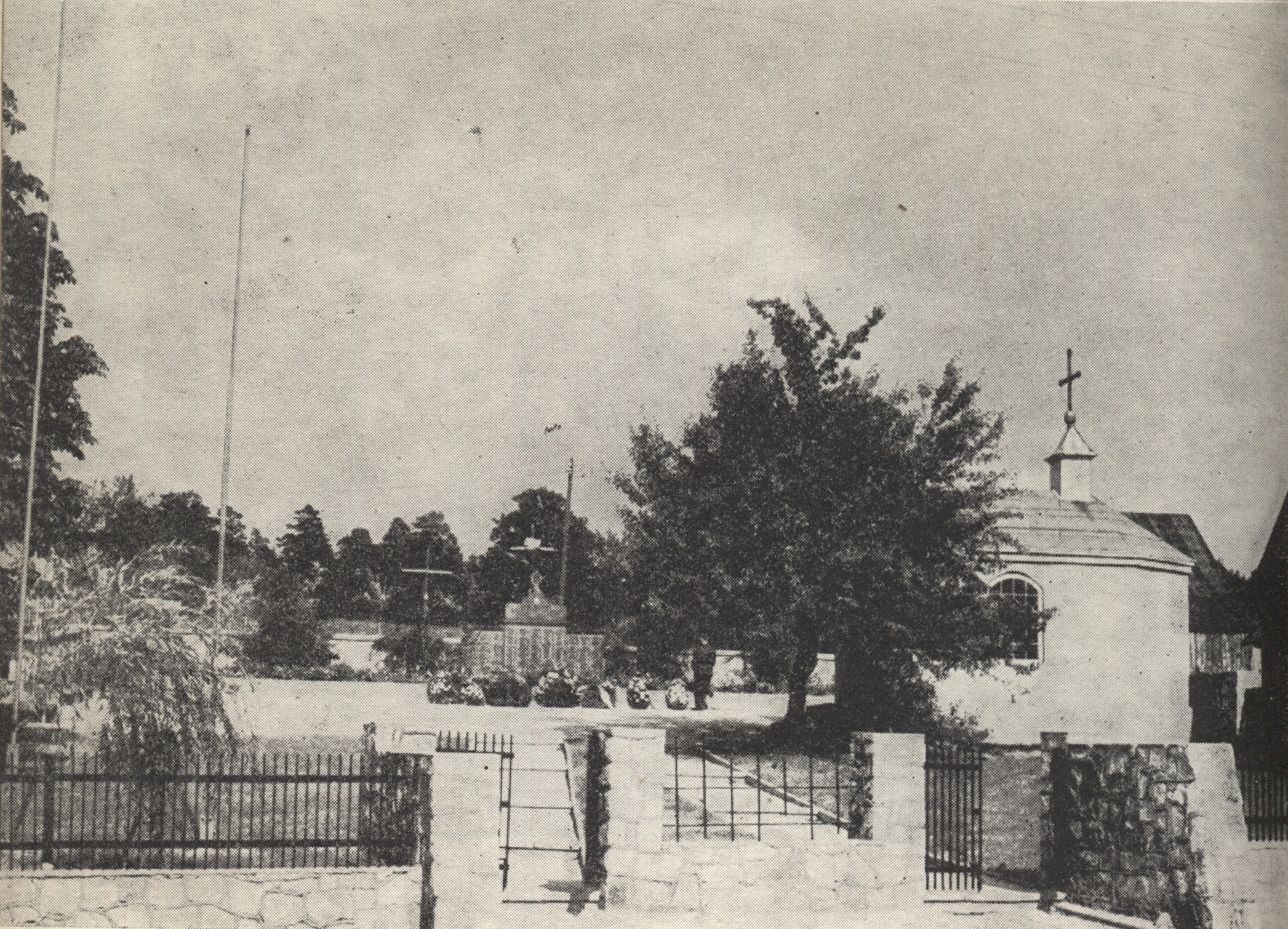
Cemetery and memorial to the victims of the Michniów massacre

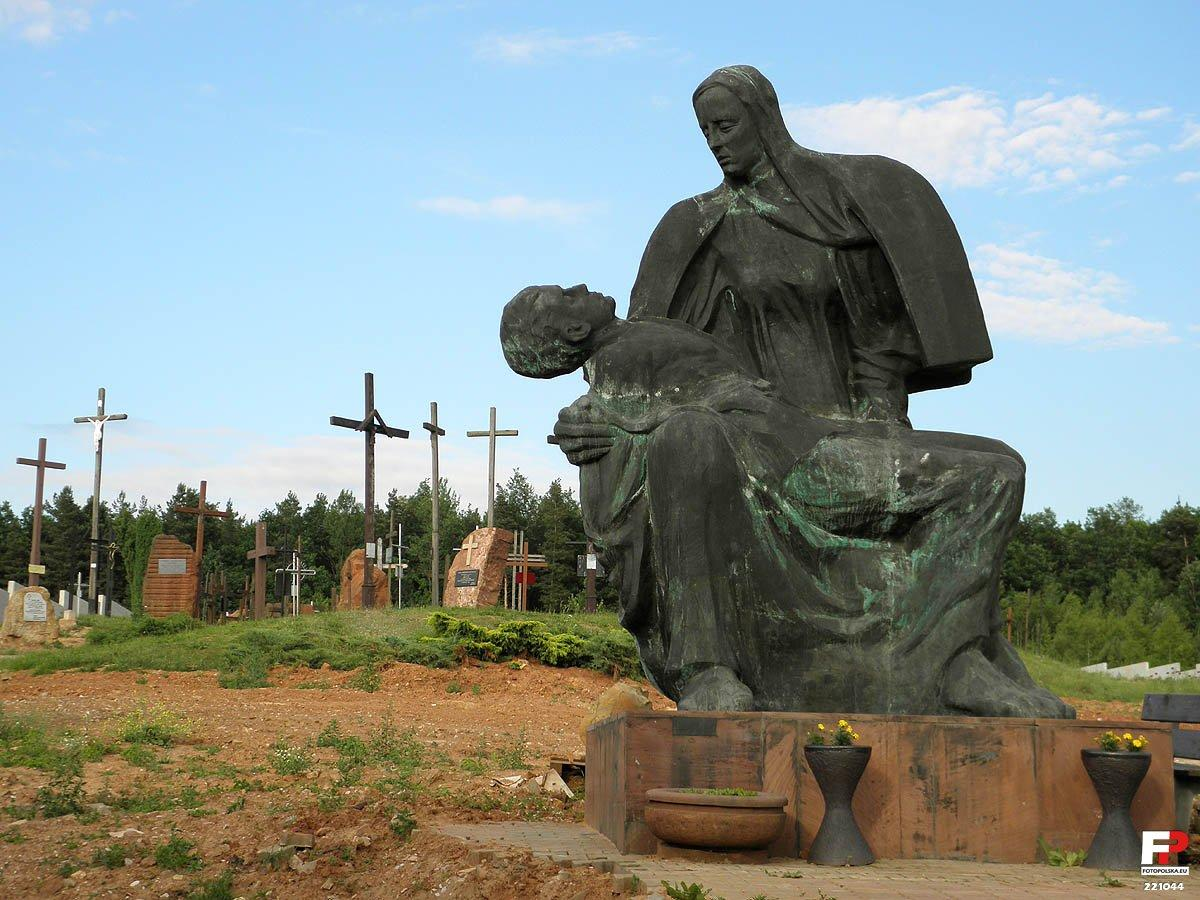
Monument to the mausoleum of martyrdom of Polish villages in Michniów, Pietà

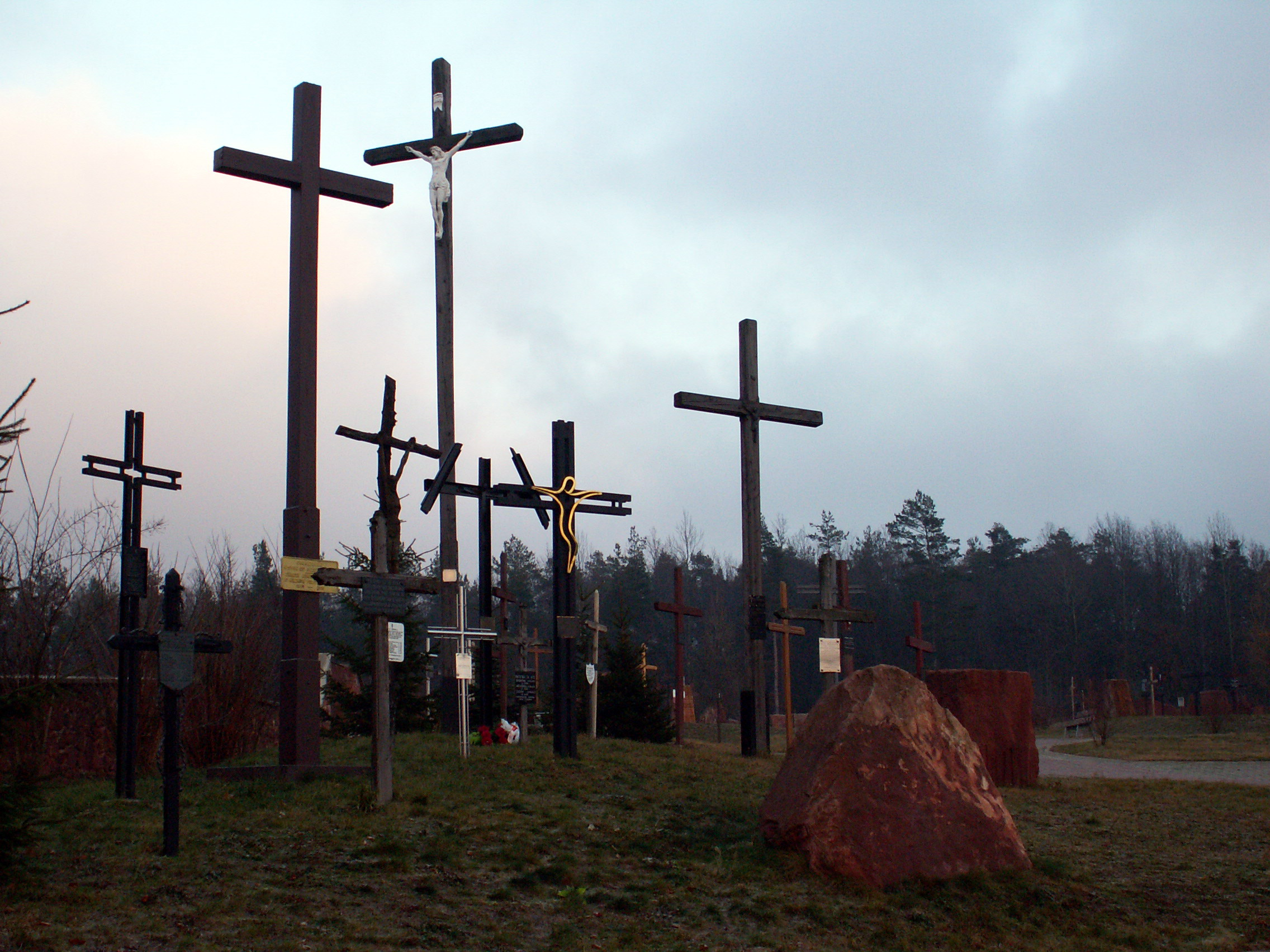
Mausoleum in Michniów, Poland

After the war, about 140 residents returned to the razed village. Initially, the survivors lived in dugouts and makeshift sheds. Despite the lack of greater support from the People's Poland authorities, the efforts of Michniów's inhabitants were rebuilt. However, the village returned to its pre-war population level only in the second half of the 1960s. The population of the surrounding towns called Michniów "the valley of death".

Shortly after the end of the occupation, a red sandstone monument was erected on a mass grave covering the remains of the victims of pacification. It carries the names of the inhabitants of Michniów who died and were killed during World War II. Over 20 years later, a Memorial Room was organized in the village. Initially, it occupied part of the premises of the Farmer's Club, opened in Michniów on May 30, 1971. In turn, in the years 1977–1997 the Memorial Room was located in a wooden house, formerly owned by the Grabiński family. Until her death in 2003, the Memorial Chamber was cared for by Maria Grabińska (she lost her husband and son during the massacre).

Michniów became a symbol of the martyrdom of Polish villages during World War II. Already during the occupation, the first poems and songs dedicated to the victims of pacification were created. The underground press also informed about the massacre. On July 22, 1977, Michniów was awarded the Order of the Cross of Grunwald 3rd Class. In the autumn of 1979, the Chief Commission for the Prosecution of Crimes against the Polish Nation proposed the creation of a nationwide Mausoleum of Martyrdom of Polish Villages. Michniów was indicated as the proposed location. In 1981, a joint appeal of the Kielce districts of the Fighters for Freedom and Democracy Association and the Polish Tourist and Sightseeing Society appeared in this matter. Three years later, the presidium of the Provincial National Council in Kielce established the Organizing Committee for the Construction of the Mausoleum of the Martyrology of the Polish Village in Michniów, headed by the defender of Westerplatte, and also the president of the provincial board of ZBoWiD – commander Leon Pająk. In 1987, the Honorary Committee was formed, chaired by Roman Malinowski – Speaker of the PRL Seym, president of the Supreme Committee of the ZSL. The cornerstone for the construction of the mausoleum was laid in November 1989. The original plans were very ambitious because they assumed the construction of a large spatial and functional complex in Michniów.

Political and economic changes that took place in Poland after 1989 resulted in the split of the Honorary Committee. This fact, as well as financial difficulties, forced modification of the project and significantly delayed its implementation. However, the idea of building a mausoleum has never been abandoned. On May 9, 1991, the "Monument-Mausoleum" Foundation was established in Michniów. In July 1993 – on the 50th anniversary of the pacification – the "Pieta Michniowska" statue by Wacław Stawecki was unveiled in Michniów. In July 1997 a new House of National Remembrance was opened. Since then, it houses a permanent exhibition and research center documenting the martyrdom of the Polish countryside during World War II. At the same time, the so-called Sanctuary of the Martyr's Polish Village, where crosses symbolizing Polish villages pacified by the Germans in 1939–1945 are placed (there are currently several hundred of them). A monument "Pożoga Wołyń" was unveiled in the sanctuary, commemorating Polish villages murdered in Volhynia by Ukrainian nationalists.

On July 12, 1999, upon the initiative of the Marshal of the Świętokrzyskie Province, Józef Szczepańczyk, a contract for the lending of assets was signed between the "Monument and the Mausoleum" Foundation and the Kielce Village Museum, under which the museum obtained the mausoleum's right to manage. Since 2008, the Kielce Countryside Museum is the official owner of the mausoleum. A broad historical education program is being implemented in Michniów, including through museum lessons and exhibitions. In 2008, a mausoleum extension project was presented. The first stage of expansion began in 2010.

The Act of the Sejm of the Republic of Poland of 29 September 2017 established 12 July, the day of pacification of Michniów, the Day of Struggle and Martyrdom of the Polish Village

== See also ==
- Ethnic cleansing of Zamojszczyzna by Nazi Germany
- Nazi crimes against the Polish nation
- Zamość uprising
- Katyn massacre
- Sochy massacre
- Lidice massacre
- Marzabotto massacre
- Oradour-sur-Glane massacre
- Sant'Anna di Stazzema massacre
- Distomo massacre
- Ochota massacre
- Wola massacre
- Ivanci massacre
