= Mausoleum of Polish Rural Martyrology in Michniów =

Mausoleum in Poland

Mausoleum of the Martyrdom of Polish Villages
- Mauzoleum Martyrologii Wsi Polskich
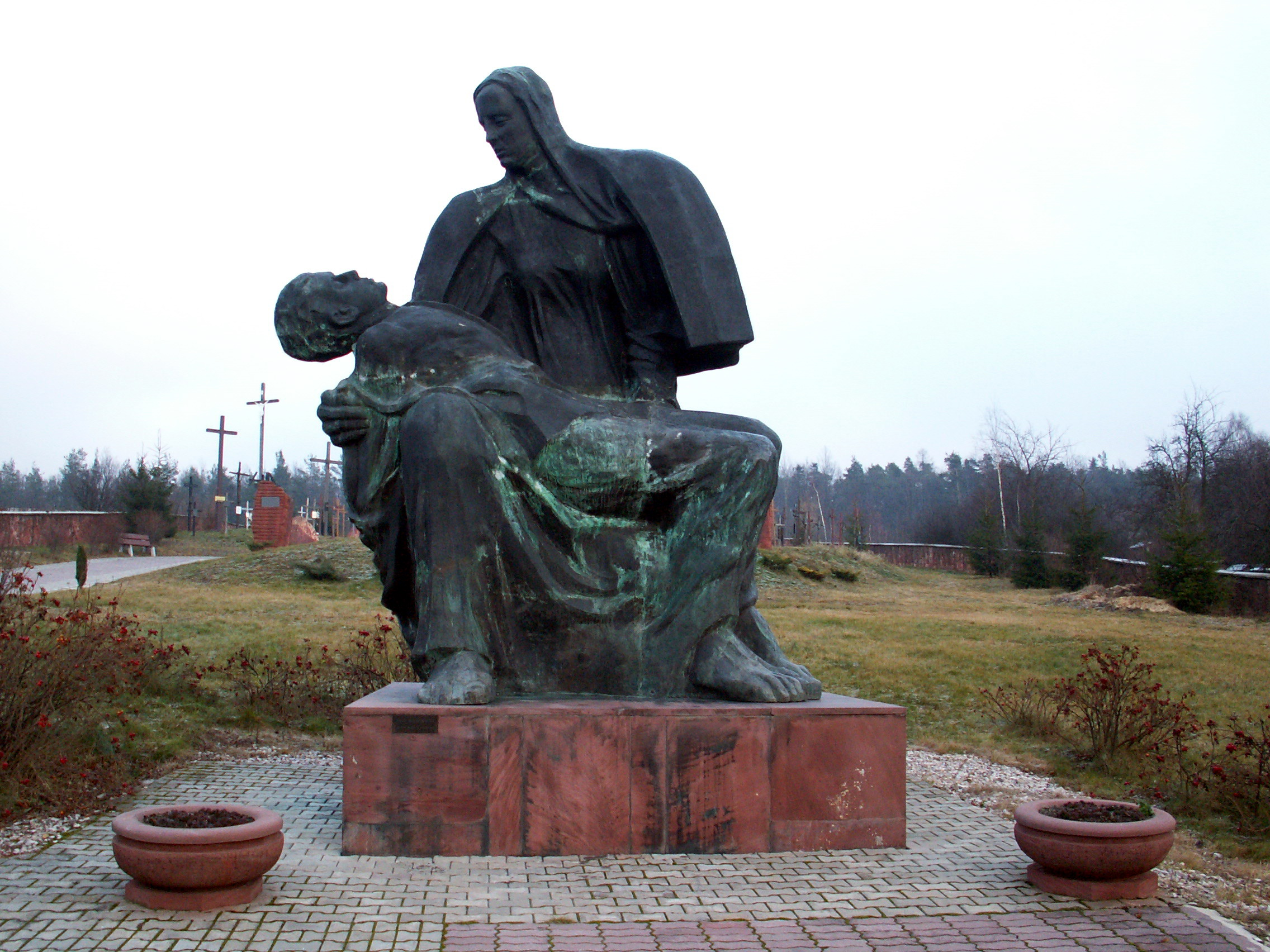
- Established: 1999
- Location: Michniów, Poland
- Coordinates: 51.0053°N 20.8489°E
- Visitors: 30,137 in 2014.
- Website: Official website

Location Michniów (in Świętokrzyskie Voivodeship) in Poland

The Mausoleum of the Martyrdom of Polish Villages (Polish: Mauzoleum Martyrologii Wsi Polskich) is a museum located in Michniów, in Świętokrzyskie Voivodeship, in Poland, constituting a branch of the Museum of the Kielce Village, commemorating the pacification actions in German-occupied Poland.

The initiative to build the Mausoleum was put forward in 1979 by the Chief Commission for the Prosecution of Crimes against the Polish Nation. The Mausoleum Organizing Committee was established in 1984, and the cornerstone was laid in 1989. Since 1999, the Mausoleum in Michniów has been under the protection of the Kielce Countryside Museum, while since 2008 it has been a branch of this Museum. The mausoleum currently includes: House of National Remembrance, Sanctuary of the Martyr's Polish Villages, cemetery and grave of victims of pacification, and a monument - "Pietà of Michniów".

In 2014, the museum was visited by 30,137 people compared to 28,311 in 2013.

== Michniów massacre ==
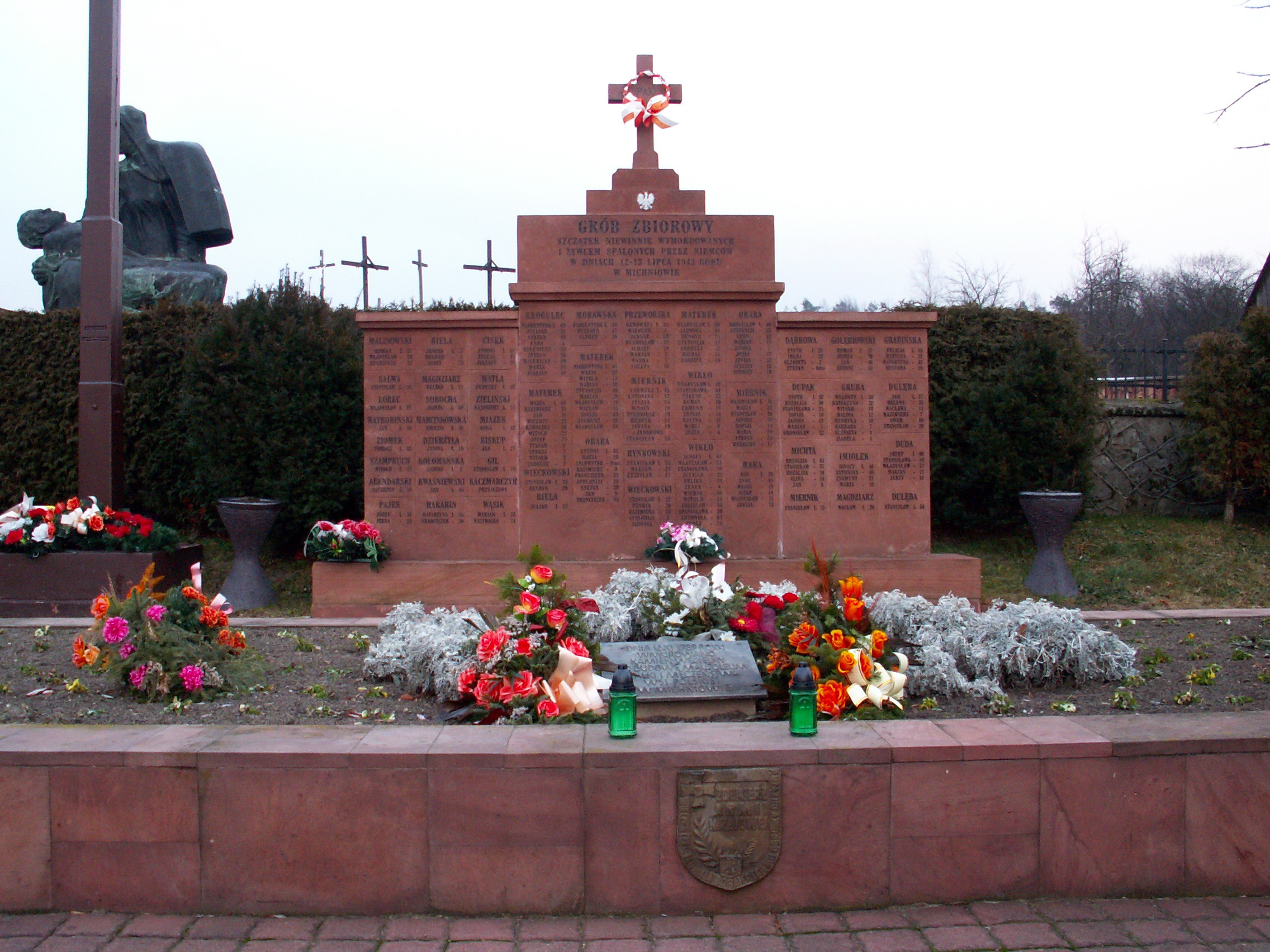
Mausoleum and Pieta in Michniów in Poland

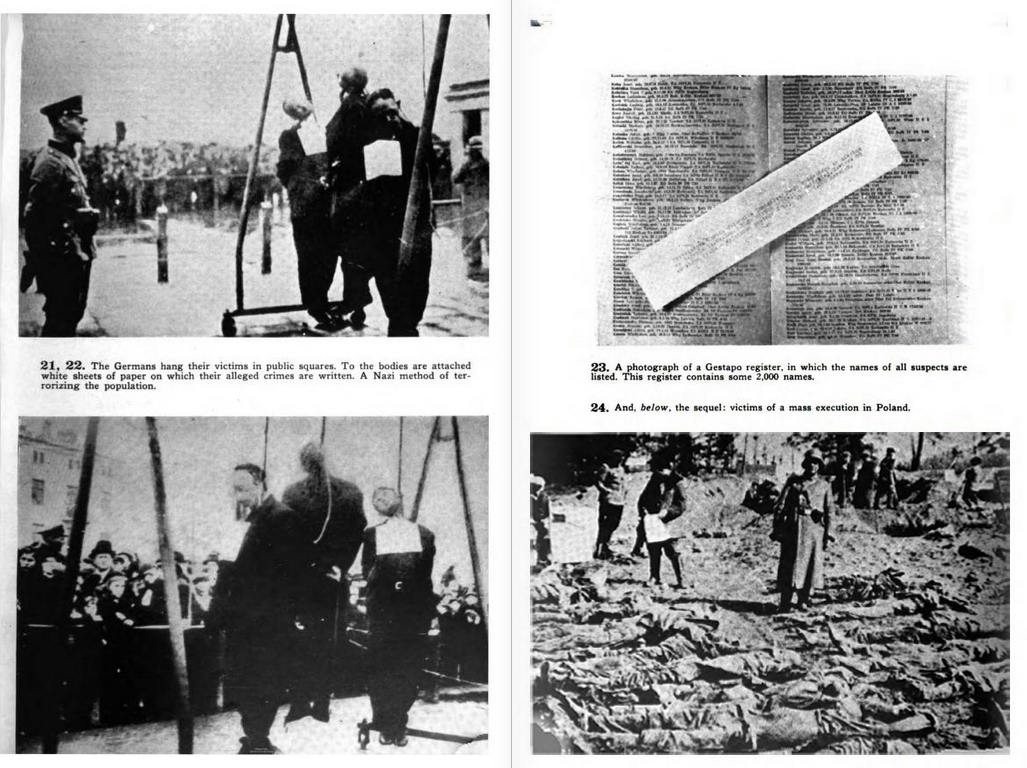
German atrocities in German-occupied Poland 1939–1945. The Black Book of Poland (21–24)

During World War II and the occupation of Poland by Nazi Germany (1939-1945), Poles were subjected to terror and mass German repression. Both in cities and in the villages. Hundreds of Polish villages were subjected to pacifications, massacres of people, executions of civilians, burning, often entire villages. During war, the inhabitants of Michniów actively cooperated with the Polish resistance movement, in particular with the Świętokrzyskie Home Army Groupings commanded by lieutenant Jan Piwnik, pseudonym "Ponury" ("Grim"), cichociemny ("Silent Unseen" special-operations paratroopers of the Polish Army in exile in SOE). Probably as a result of denunciators' reports, especially Jerzy Wojnowski pseudonym "Motor", the occupiers from Nazi Germany decided to carry out extensive repression in Michniów. On July 12, 1943, the village was massacred by a German forces, which included subunits of the 17th and 22nd Police Regiment, gendarmerie from nearby facilities, and Gestapo officers from Kielce. At that time, Germans partly burned Michniów and murdered 102 inhabitants (mostly by burning alive in barns). In retaliation that same night, soldiers of the Polish resistance movement from Jan Piwnik's unit attacked the express train Kraków-Warsaw in the area of Podłazie, killing or injuring at least a dozen soldiers of Nazi Germany. The next day, German policemen returned to Michniów, completely burning the village and murdering almost all Poles staying there. In total, at least 204 people were victims of the massacre in Michniów, including 54 women and 48 children, as many as ten of them were less than 10 years old. The youngest victim was a nine-day Stefanek Dąbrowa, thrown by a German military policeman into a burning barn. 10 people suspected of cooperating with the underground were deported to German concentration camps (only three survived), and 18 young women and girls were sent to forced labor in Nazi Germany. The village was completely burned (only two buildings survived). Occupational authorities forbade the reconstruction of Michniów and cultivation of the surrounding fields.

In the repressive actions of 1939–1945, the Germans murdered 19,792 people.

=== The first burial of victims ===
On July 15, 1943, the inhabitants of neighboring villages buried the remains of the murdered Michniów residents in a common grave dug on a plot near the school. The Germans agreed to the burial of the victims. However, they ordered to plow the grave and did not allow marking the grave with a cross or any other sign.

=== Memory ===
After the war, Michniów was rebuilt. Shortly after the end of the occupation, a red sandstone monument was erected on a mass grave covering the remains of the victims of pacification. It carries the names of the inhabitants of Michniów murdered in the 1943 massacre and murdered during World War II.

From 1945 on, every anniversary of the crime, residents of Michałów gather for mass for the victims. In the 1950s, residents of Michniów built a chapel of St. Margaret. Occasional religious ceremonies are held there, and Sunday masses in the summer.

In time, the Memorial Chamber was established in the village. Initially, it occupied part of the premises of the Farmer's Club, opened in Michniów on May 30, 1971. In July 1977, the Memorial Room was moved to a wooden house, formerly owned by the Grabiński family. Until her death in 2003, the Memorial Chamber was cared for by Maria Grabińska (she lost her husband and son during the pacification).

On July 22, 1977, Michniów was awarded the Order of the Cross of Grunwald 3rd Class.

=== Return of lieutenant Jan Piwnik ===
In September 1987, the ashes of Major Jan Piwnik were brought from Nowogródczyzna. Jan Piwnik pseudonym "Grim" was killed in the fight against Nazi Germany at Jewłasze (16 June 1944). In June 1988 his solemn funeral took place. The major's last route led from his hometown Janowice through Nagorzyce, Michniów, hill of "Wykus", Rataje to the Cistercian monastery in Wąchock. Bishop Edward Materski celebrated the mass in Michniów. In 1994, Michniów also said goodbye to the late soldier Eugeniusz Kaszyński, pseudonym "Nurt".

== Circumstances of the creation of the mausoleum ==
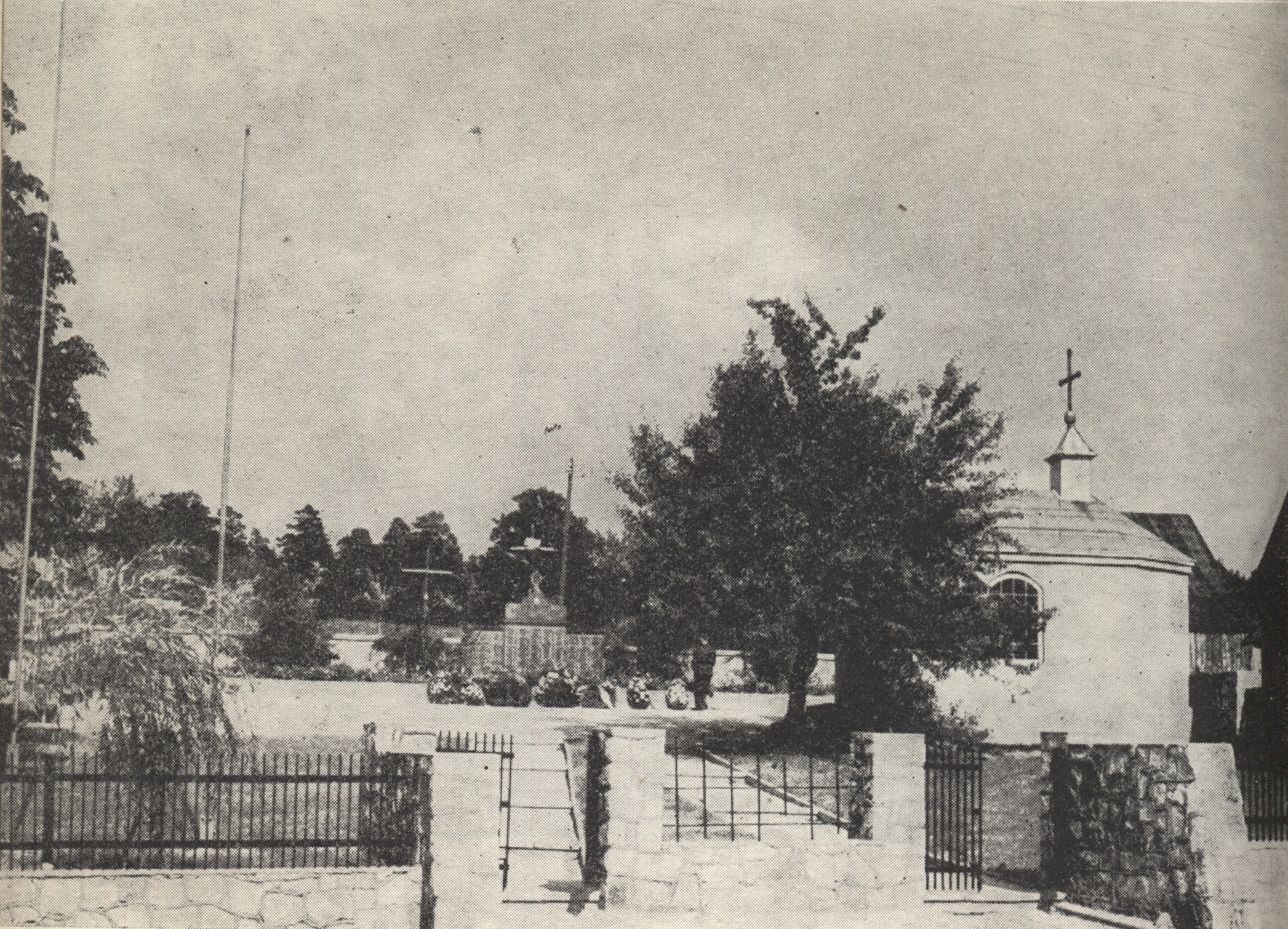
Monument at the cemetery of Polish victims of the German Nazi massacre in Michniów

After the war, Michniów became a symbol of the martyrdom of Polish villages during World War II. Already during the German occupation of Poland (1939–1945), the first poems and songs dedicated to the victims of pacification were created. The Polish underground press also informed about the massacre.

In the autumn of 1979, the Chief Commission for the Prosecution of Crimes against the Polish Nation put forward an initiative to establish a nationwide Mausoleum of Martyrdom of Polish Villages. Michniów was indicated as the proposed location. In 1981, a joint appeal of the Kielce districts of the Society of Fighters for Freedom and Democracy and the Polish Tourist and Sightseeing Society appeared in this matter. Three years later, the presidium of the Provincial National Council in Kielce established the Organizing Committee for the Construction of the Mausoleum of Martyrdom of the Polish Village in Michniów. The committee was headed by Westerplatte's defender in Battle of Westerplatte, and also the president of the ZBoWiD provincial board - commander Leon Pająk. In 1987, the Honorary Committee was established under the leadership of Roman Malinowski - Marshal of the Sejm of the Polish People's Republic. The cornerstone for the construction of the mausoleum was laid in November 1989. The original plans were very ambitious because they assumed the construction of a large spatial and functional complex in Michniów.

== The current nature of the mausoleum ==
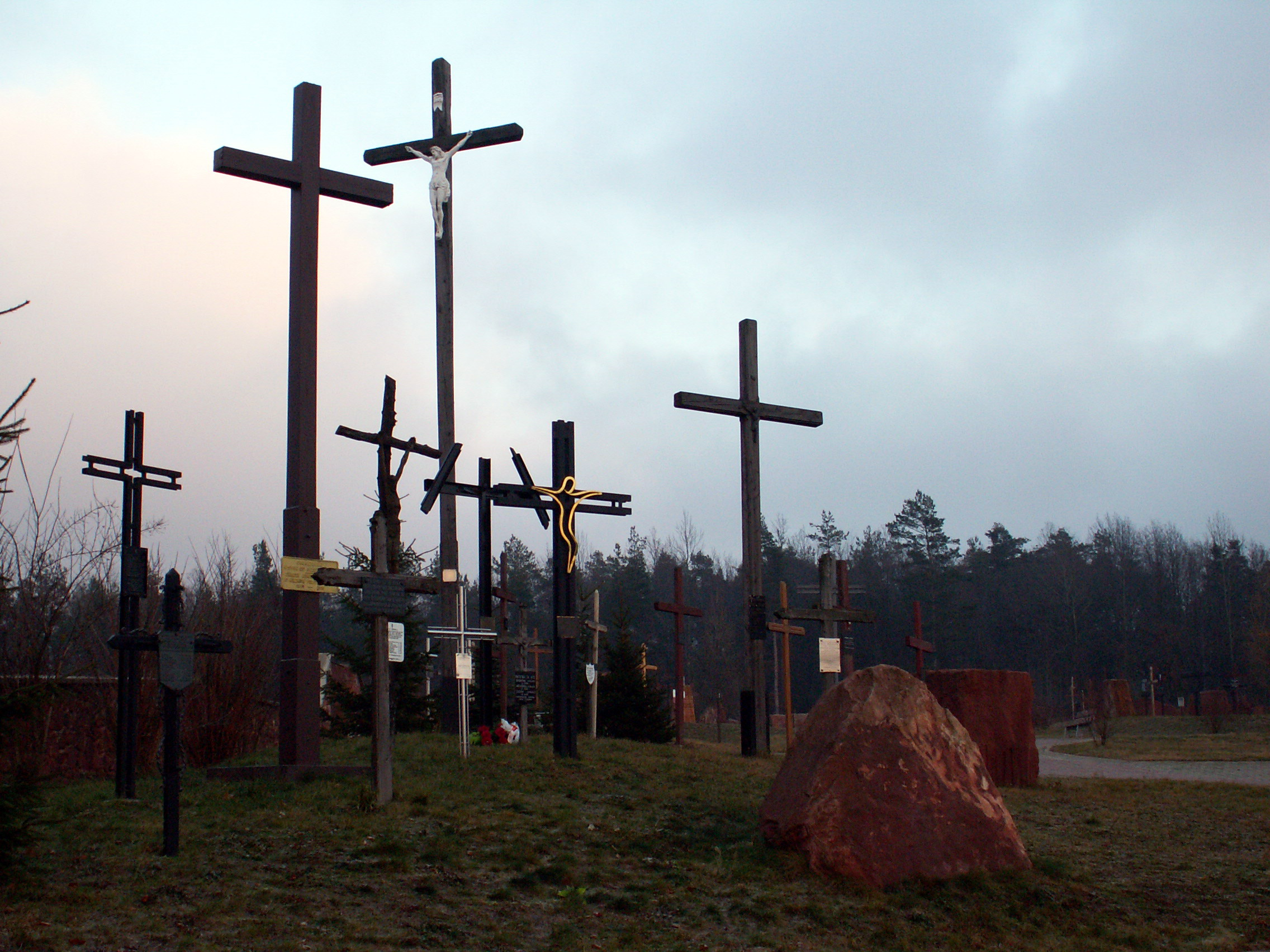
Mausoleum in Michniów

Political and economic changes that took place in Poland after 1989 caused the split of the Honorary Committee. This fact, as well as financial difficulties, forced modification of the project and significantly delayed its implementation. However, the idea of building a mausoleum has never been abandoned. On May 9, 1991, the "Monument-Mausoleum" Foundation was established in Michniów. Its goal was to activate all social and political forces to support the initiative to save from forgetting the martyrdom of Polish villages.

In July 1993 - on the 50th anniversary of the pacification - the "Pieta of Michniów" statue by Wacław Stawecki was unveiled in Michniów. In July 1997 a new House of National Remembrance was opened. It houses a permanent exhibition and research center documenting the martyrdom of Polish villages during World War II. In the square behind the grave of the victims of the massacre in Michniów, the Sanctuary of the Martyr's Polish Villages was opened. Crosses symbolizing Polish villages massacred by the Germans in 1939–1945 are placed in the sanctuary (there are now several hundred of them). In 2004, at the initiative of former soldiers of the 27th Home Army Infantry Division, a monument "Pożoga Wołynia" (English: "Volhynia Conflagration") was unveiled in the sanctuary. It commemorates Polish villages murdered in Volhynia by Ukrainian nationalists.

On July 12, 1999, at the initiative of the marshal of the Świętokrzyskie Province, Józef Szczepańczyk, an agreement was signed between the "Monument -Mausoleum" Foundation and the Museum of the Kielce Village in Kielce. Since 2008, the Museum of the Kielce Village in Kielce is the official owner of the mausoleum. A broad historical education program is being implemented in Michniów, including through museum lessons, publications and exhibitions.

On the 65th anniversary of the Michniów massacre (in 2008), a project was presented to expand the existing museum object, developed by Mirosław Nizio. Project assumptions include construction of a new exhibition building (consisting of 8 modules-segments). In 2010, the first stage of expansion began. At that time, the existing building was rebuilt and technical infrastructure was built: parking lots, fencing and technical buildings

== See also ==
- War crimes in occupied Poland during World War II
- Nazi crimes against the Polish nation
- Ochota massacre
- Wola massacre
- Warsaw Uprising Museum
- Katyń Museum
- Markowa Ulma-Family Museum of Poles Who Saved Jews in World War II
- Mausoleum of Struggle and Martyrdom
- Museum of the Second World War
- Oradour-sur-Glane massacre
- Lidice massacre
- Sant'Anna di Stazzema massacre
