= Pacification actions in German-occupied Poland =

- Location: German occupied Poland
- Date: 1939-1945
- Target: Polish people
- Attack type: Genocidal massacre, summary execution, reprisal, collective punishment, mass rape
- Perpetrators: Nazi Germany, Wehrmacht, General Governorate for the Occupied Polish Region
- Motive: Reprisal, Anti-Polish sentiment, Germanisation, pacification of the Polish people to Nazi authority

Pacification actions were one of many punitive measures designed by Nazi Germany to inflict terror on the civilian population of occupied Polish villages and towns with the use of military and police force. They were an integral part of the war of aggression against the Polish nation waged by Germany since September 1, 1939. The projected goal of pacification operations was to prevent and suppress the Polish resistance movement in World War II nevertheless, among the victims were children as young as 1.5 years old, women, fathers attempting to save their families, farmers rushing to rescue livestock from burning buildings, patients, victims already wounded, and hostages of many ethnicities including Poles and Jews.

War crimes committed during pacification actions in occupied Poland were probed by the West German Central Office of Justice in Ludwigsburg in September 1959 and, in accordance with the German Criminal Code (§ 78/3 pt. 2, and § 212), ultimately thrown out as already expired due to German statutes of limitations. No further investigations were conducted until June 1971 when the 1939 crimes of the 1st Panzer Division in Poland (Polenfeldzug) were also thrown out as unlikely after a statement by Major Walther Wenck, which was accepted on good faith. The inquiries by the Polish Institute of National Remembrance into massacres in specific locations are ongoing. Historical data collected in Poland confirms the complete destruction of 554,000 farms valued at 6.062 million złoty (1938 level) with 8 million dead cattle and horses, on top of terrible human losses. Several hundred villages were wiped off the map. In just a year and a half between January 1, 1943, and July 31, 1944, the Wehrmacht army alone conducted 1,106 pacification actions in occupied Poland, independent of the killing operations by Einsatzgruppen and auxiliary forces, and the ongoing Holocaust of the Jews.

== Background ==
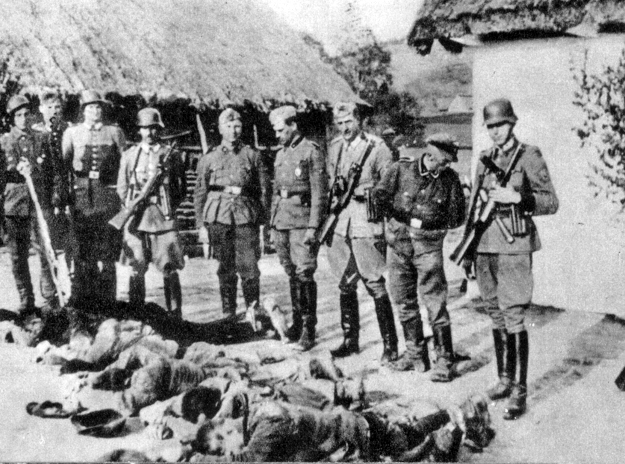
Polish villagers killed by the German police near Radom, occupied Poland, 1943

The so-called "pacification operations" were introduced along with all other extermination policies directed against Poland already in September 1939, and were of a large scale, resulting in the confirmed murder of approximately 20,000 villagers. Massacres were conducted in the areas of General Government, Pomorze, and in the vicinities of Białystok and Greater Poland. The number of Polish settlements targeted in these operations is approximately 825 (in modern-day Poland, see below). The regular German army conducted 760 mass executions during their march across central Poland. Material losses from wanton destruction of Polish countryside unrelated to military maneuvers are estimated at 30 million złoty in the area of General Government alone.

As noted by World War II historians, the pacification actions were separate from the likes of Operation Tannenberg. They were not a part of the indiscriminate killings by the mobile Einsatzkommando death squads active during the invasion of Poland of 1939, and characterized by often deliberate targeting of civilian population by the invading forces, with the active participation of the German minority living in the Second Polish Republic whose men joined the SS armed Volksdeutscher Selbstschutz battalions in West Prussia, Upper Silesia and Warthegau. In total, up to 200,000 Poles lost their lives at the beginning of war regardless of the nature of the conflict. Likewise, over 100,000 Poles died in the Luftwaffe's terror bombing operations.

The pacification actions were conducted in west-central Poland as well in the eastern Kresy regions re-captured from the USSR in 1941, including in the Polesie Voivodeship, Nowogródek Voivodeship and others, comprising most of contemporary West Belarus. These tactics were the main local means of the Holocaust in occupied Poland. Some 627 villages were razed in eastern Poland by the SS with the help of collaborationist battalions including Belarusian, Ukrainian and others, during 60 pacification and 80 punitive operations there. The battalions of Belarusian Home Defence (BKA) alone massacred some 30,000 Jews during pacification of villages. Collective punishment was used during such operations to discourage offering shelter to Soviet POWs and providing aid to any guerrilla forces. Pacifications included the extermination of entire villages including women and children, expulsions, the burning of homes, confiscation of private property, and arrests. In many instances the operations of this kind conducted jointly by the Einsatzgruppen and the German Order Police battalions, were characterized by extreme brutality. An example of such tactics was the burning alive of 91 hostages including 31 women and 31 children in the village of Jabłoń-Dobki in the Białystok region on March 8, 1944. Once the fire got going, a grenade was thrown in.

=== German advance into Poland ===
The first pacification action, conducted on the ground by the Wehrmacht officers and soldiers, took place in Złoczew on September 3 and 4, 1939, in which the German soldiers murdered some 200 Poles. According to historian Alexander B. Rossino, the atrocity was committed with the participation of the 1st SS Panzer Division Leibstandarte SS Adolf Hitler (LSSAH), which was also involved in the murder of 50 Polish Jews in Błonie near Warsaw, and the shooting actions in Bolesławiec, Torzeniec, Goworowo, Mława, and Włocławek. LSSAH torched villages along the road without military justification.

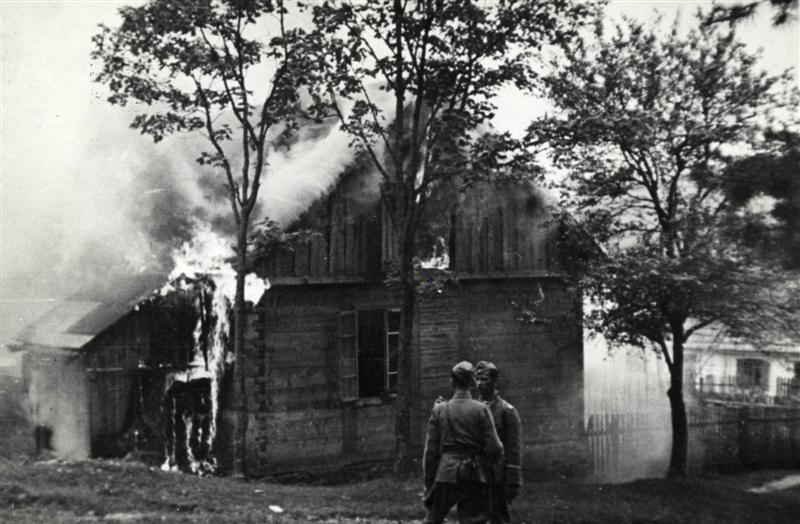
Pacification of Michniów, July 12–13, 1943; massacre of 204 inhabitants: 102 men, 54 women and 48 children.

The Polish Institute of National Remembrance has documented the use of military force with the goal of inflicting terror and suppressing Polish resistance. One example was a reprisal action by units of the 19th Panzer Corps Division taken for the operations of the Suwalska Cavalry Brigade of the Polish Army. During the evening of 13 September 1939, thirteen people from Olszewo and ten people from the nearby village of Pietkowo were killed. The victims among the villagers include women and children who were murdered in several ways, such as stabbing by bayonets, shooting, being blown apart by grenades, and being burned alive in a barn.

According to article by Witold Kulesza published in Komentarze Historyczne by the Institute of National Remembrance, German Regiment SS-Leibstandarte "Adolf Hitler" of the 17th Division arrived in Złoczew on September 3, 1939 on motorcycles and on bicycles. The burning of the town and mass killings began the same night. According to eye-witness Janina Modrzewska, who survived the pacification of Złoczew, the soldiers were killing everyone they saw. Total casualties amounted to 200 dead victims. From the air, Luftwaffe planes bombed the villages of Momoty Dolne, Momoty Górne, Pawłów, Tokary, Sochy and Klew. Some places were subjected to multiple pacification operations. In the town of Aleksandrów in Biłgoraj County between 1939 and 1944, German authorities murdered 290 civilians (444 according to WIEM), wounded 43, deported 434 to forced labour camps, and burned at least 113 households.

The Białystok region fell under German occupation twice. Overrun by the Wehrmacht in 1939 it was the site of mass pacification actions even before it was ceded to the Soviets two weeks later in accordance with the Nazi-Soviet pact. It was invaded again in the course of Operation Barbarossa with similar results. At least 750 villages there had at least 10 inhabitants murdered, and at least 75 villages were destroyed completely (see: table for partial list of names of villages and the number of dead victims). (Note: Marcin Markiewicz, OBEP IPN Białystok (2003–2004), Represje Hitlerowskie wobec Wsi Białostockiej. Biuletyn Instytutu Pamięci Narodowej, NR 12–1 (35–36). In his article for the Biuletyn IPN journal published by the Institute of National Remembrance Markiewicz wrote that in September 1939 alone, with no connection with military manoeuvres, Wehrmacht razed to the ground 30 villages in Bielsk County, Wysokie Mazowieckie County, Suwałki County and Łomża County, while 19 villages were pacified and burned in the Bialystok Voivodeship alone. The most brutal were the pacifications and killings in the villages of Wyliny-Ruś, Drogoszewo, Rutki and Pietraszki, where the Germans were shooting children and the elderly.) Modern international law considers these types of actions against civilians to constitute genocide, whether conducted within national boundaries or in occupied territories.

=== The forcible depopulation of Zamojszczyzna ===
Between November 1942 and March 1943 on direct orders from Heinrich Himmler, 116,000 Polish men and women were expelled in just a few months during Action Zamość. In Polish historiography the events surrounding the Nazi German roundups are often named alternatively as the Children of Zamojszczyzna to emphasize the apprehension of around 30,000 children at that time, snatched away from their parents who were transported from Zamojszczyzna to concentration camps. The expulsions encompassed the districts of Hrubieszów, Tomaszów Lubelski, Zamość and Biłgoraj, and were completed in March 1943. In total 297 Polish villages were depopulated.

== Villages and dead victims ==
Investigations by the Polish Institute of National Remembrance into pacifications of specific villages focus on locations within contemporary Poland. They are exponentially greater within the prewar borders of the Republic.

Village name	Killed	Village name	Killed	Village name	Killed
Borów	232 (103 children)	Cyców	111	Jamy	147
Kaszyce	117	Kitów	174	Krasowo-Częstki	257 (83 children)
Krusze	148	Kulno	100	Lipniak-Majorat	over 370
Łążek	187	Michniów	204 (48 children)	Milejów	150
Mrozy	over 100	Olszanka	103	Rajsk	over 143
Różaniec	circa 200	Skłoby	265	Smoligów	circa 200
Sochy	183	Sumin	118	Szczecyn	368 (71 children)
Wanaty	109	Zamość	470	Szczebrzeszyn	208
Łabunie	210	Krasnobród	285 (200 Jews)	Mokre	304
Nielisz	301	Nowa Osada	195	Radecznica	212
Skierbieszów	335	Stary Zamość	287	Suchowola	324
Sułów	252	Tereszpol	344	Wysokie	203
Zwierzyniec	412	Kitów	165	Królewiec / Szałas	over 100 each

The list of pacified villages within the borders of postwar Poland was arranged by the IPN according to one of Poland's eleven present-day voivodeships (administrative regions) which were not a part of Nazi Germany upon the 1939 invasion of Poland. Likewise, all settlements presently within the borders of post-Soviet Ukraine and Belarus are excluded from the list. They belonged to Poland's prewar Lwów Voivodeship, Nowogródek Voivodeship (1919–39), Polesie Voivodeship, Stanisławów Voivodeship, Tarnopol Voivodeship, Wilno Voivodeship (1926–39), and Wołyń Voivodeship (1921–39). The number of pacified villages for each of the present-day voivodeships is as follows.

Poland's prewar and postwar borders, 1939–1945. The Institute of National Remembrance, which has prosecution powers in post-communist Poland, limits its own inquiries into German atrocities committed within the present-day borders of the country.

1. Kujawsko-Pomorskie Voivodeship: 29
2. Lubelskie Voivodeship: 103
3. Łódzkie Voivodeship: 26
4. Małopolskie Voivodeship: 24
5. Podkarpackie Voivodeship: 21
6. Podlaskie Voivodeship: 34
7. Pomorskie Voivodeship: 6
8. Śląskie Voivodeship: 15
9. Świętokrzyskie Voivodeship: 53
10. Warmińsko-Mazurskie Voivodeship: 2
11. Wielkopolskie Voivodeship: 26

== See also ==
- War crimes in occupied Poland during World War II
- Nazi crimes against the Polish nation
- Valley of Death (Bydgoszcz)
- Operation Tannenberg
- Generalplan Ost plan of colonization
- German camps in occupied Poland during World War II
- Anti-Polish sentiment
- Convention on the Prevention and Punishment of the Crime of Genocide
- Mausoleum of Polish Rural Martyrology in Michniów
- German crimes during the September Campaign
