= Krzyżka =

- Village
- Location within Poland
- Coordinates: 51°0′0″N 20°49′35″E
- Country: Poland
- Voivodeship: Świętokrzyskie
- County: Skarżysko
- Gmina: Suchedniów
- Population: 180

Krzyżka [ˈkʂɨʂka] is a village in the administrative district of Gmina Suchedniów, within Skarżysko County, Świętokrzyskie Voivodeship, in south-central Poland. It lies approximately 6 km (4 mi) south of Suchedniów, 15 km (9 mi) south-west of Skarżysko-Kamienna, and 20 km (12 mi) north-east of the regional capital Kielce.
