= Mostki, Skarżysko County =

Mostki
- Village
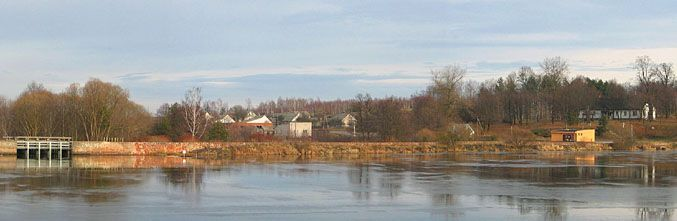

- Location within Poland
- Coordinates: 51°3′25″N 20°54′4″E
- Country: Poland
- Voivodeship: Świętokrzyskie
- County: Skarżysko
- Gmina: Suchedniów
- Population: 510
- Website: http://www.mostki.pl/

Mostki [ˈmɔstki] is a village in the administrative district of Gmina Suchedniów, within Skarżysko County, Świętokrzyskie Voivodeship, in south-central Poland. It lies approximately 5 km (3 mi) east of Suchedniów, 7 km (4 mi) south of Skarżysko-Kamienna, and 28 km (17 mi) north-east of the regional capital Kielce.
