= Herbert Böttcher =

SS and Police Leader and SS-Brigadeführer

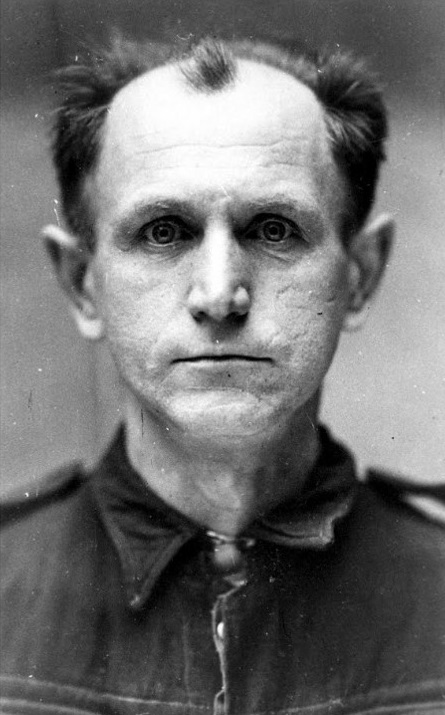
- Böttcher in captivity in Poland (c.1947–1950) in a photograph taken by the Main Commission for the Investigation of Nazi Crimes in Poland
- Born: 24 April 1907; Prökuls, East Prussia Kingdom of Prussia, German Empire
- Died: 12 June 1950 (aged 43); Radom, People's Republic of Poland
- Cause of death: Execution by hanging
- Military career
- Allegiance: Nazi Germany
- Branch: Schutzstaffel (SS)
- Service years: 1939–1945
- Rank: SS-Brigadeführer and Generalmajor of Police
- Commands: SS and Police Leader, "Radom"; Police Director, Memel; Police President, Kassel
- Conflicts: World War II
- Awards: War Merit Cross, 1st and 2nd class, with Swords

Herbert Kurt Böttcher (24 April 1907, Prökuls – 12 June 1950, Radom) was a German lawyer, and chief of police of Memel (today, Klaipėda) and Kassel. He was also an SS-Brigadeführer and Generalmajor of police who served as the last SS and Police Leader in Radom during the Second World War. After the war, he was tried and executed for Holocaust-related crimes.

== Early life ==
Böttcher was born in Prökuls, East Prussia (today, Priekulė, Lithuania) the son of a local politician, and attended the Memel gymnasium. After passing his Abitur, he studied law at the University of Königsberg, the Ludwig-Maximilians-Universität München, and the University of Vienna. In 1925, he became active in the Corps Littuania, a German Student Corps in Königsberg. He was awarded a Doctor of Laws degree in May 1931 at the University of Leipzig. After passing the state law examination in 1933, he settled into practice as a lawyer and notary in Memel.

In the interwar years, Memelland had been ceded by Germany in the Versailles Treaty and was governed by Lithuania. Böttcher was active in the Socialist People's Community of the Memel Region (Sozialistische Volksgemeinschaft des Memelgebiets, SOVOG) and became involved in political agitation on behalf of reunification of the region with Germany. Along with dozens of other agitators around this time, he was brought to trial, convicted of actions against the state and sentenced to eight years in prison in 1934. After being released from prison in 1937, Böttcher was elected to the Parliament of the Klaipėda Region in September 1935 as a representative of the Unified German List. In January 1939, Böttcher became one of the six members of the Directorate of the Klaipėda Region, the region's executive. (His father Otto, had served as the Directorate President in 1931–1932.) Böttcher remained in office until the German ultimatum to Lithuania resulted in the cession of Memelland to Germany on 23 March 1939.

== SS and police career ==
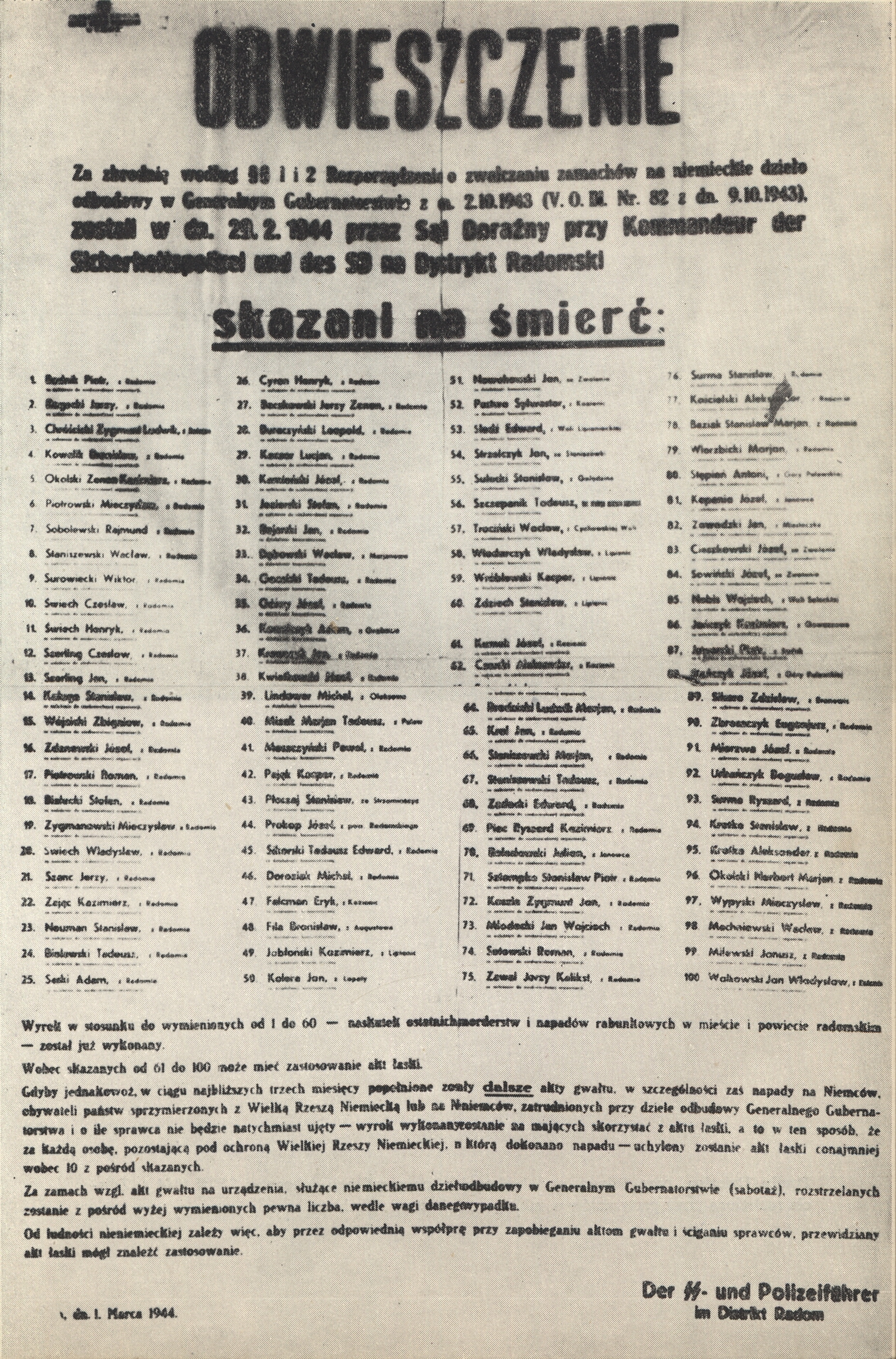
Böttcher's notice of the execution of Polish hostages in Radom, 1 March 1944.

In the spring of 1939, Böttcher became a member of the Nazi Party (membership number 7,093,097) and also joined the SS (SS number 323,036) on 23 March with the rank of SS-Sturmbannführer. From 1 August 1939 to 15 March 1941 he headed the 105th SS-Standarte "Nordost," headquartered in Memel. In addition, he was named Acting Police Director for the Memel region on 27 March 1940. On 1 October 1940, he transferred to become the Police President in Kassel. On 12 May 1942 he succeeded SS-Brigadeführer Carl Oberg as the last SS and Police Leader (SSPF) of the Radom District in the General Government. There he oversaw the deportation of more than 300,000 Jews from the Radom Ghetto to the Treblinka extermination camp between August 1942 and June 1944. In an effort to prevent Poles from assisting those Jews who tried to escape from the ghetto, Böttcher issued the following instructions:

In the Radom District ... police superintendent Herbert Böttcher’s order to German police stations ... provided that if weapons or Jews were found in a Polish house all persons living there (including children) were to be killed and the house was to be burnt down. Such actions were to serve as a warning to other Poles who might want to help those fleeing the ghettos.

Böttcher also was implicated in the related Michniów massacre of 12–13 July 1943, in which 204 inhabitants were murdered, and their village burned to the ground in retaliation for their alleged assistance to the Polish resistance. On 9 November 1944, Böttcher was promoted to SS-Brigadeführer and Generalmajor of police. The Red Army liberated Radom on 16 January 1945, and Böttcher's command was effectively eliminated.

== SS and police ranks ==
Böttcher's SS and police ranks
Date	Rank
23 March 1939	SS-Sturmbannführer
1 August 1940	SS-Obersturmbannführer
9 October 1941	SS-Standartenführer
20 April 1943	SS-Oberführer
9 November 1943	Oberst der polizei
9 November 1944	SS-Brigadeführer und Generalmajor der polizei

== Postwar capture, prosecution and execution ==
After the end of the war in Europe, Böttcher was arrested by the Royal Military Police and sent to internment camps in Neumünster-Gadeland and Neuengamme located in the British occupation zone. He was extradited to the People's Republic of Poland by the British in 1947. He was put on trial in Radom, sentenced to death on 18 June 1949, and a year later executed by hanging.

== Sources ==
- Klee, Ernst (2007). Das Personenlexikon zum Dritten Reich. Wer war was vor und nach 1945. Frankfurt-am-Main: Fischer-Taschenbuch-Verlag. ISBN 978-3-596-16048-8.
- Yerger, Mark C. (1997). Allgemeine-SS: The Commands, Units and Leaders of the General SS. Schiffer Publishing Ltd. ISBN 0-7643-0145-4.
