= Ostojów =

- Village
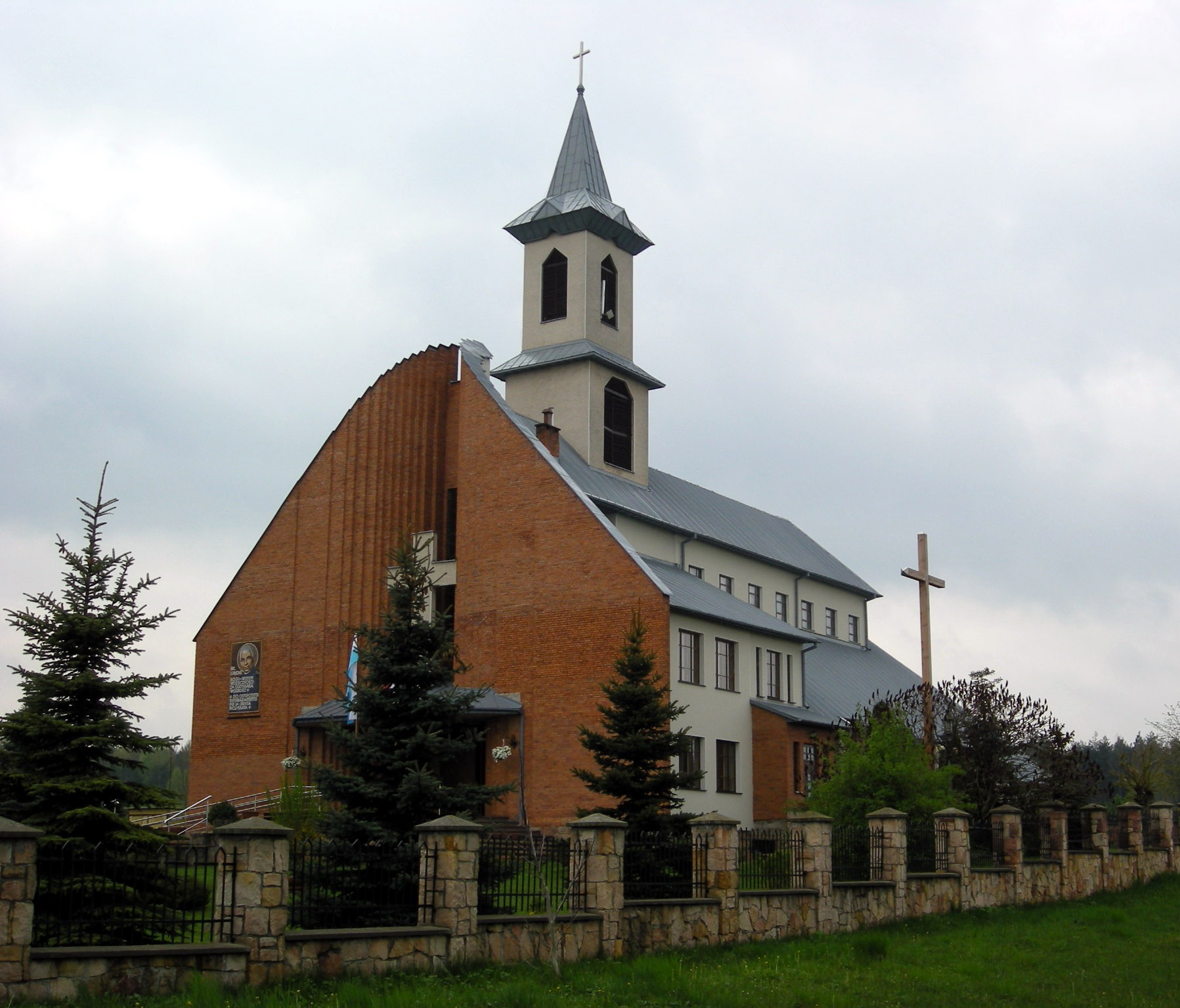

- Location within Poland
- Coordinates: 51°1′1″N 20°49′11″E
- Country: Poland
- Voivodeship: Świętokrzyskie
- County: Skarżysko
- Gmina: Suchedniów
- Population: 940

Ostojów [ɔsˈtɔjuf] is a village in the administrative district of Gmina Suchedniów, within Skarżysko County, Świętokrzyskie Voivodeship, in south-central Poland. It lies approximately 4 km (2 mi) south of Suchedniów, 13 km (8 mi) south-west of Skarżysko-Kamienna, and 21 km (13 mi) north-east of the regional capital Kielce.
