= Smoligów =

- Village
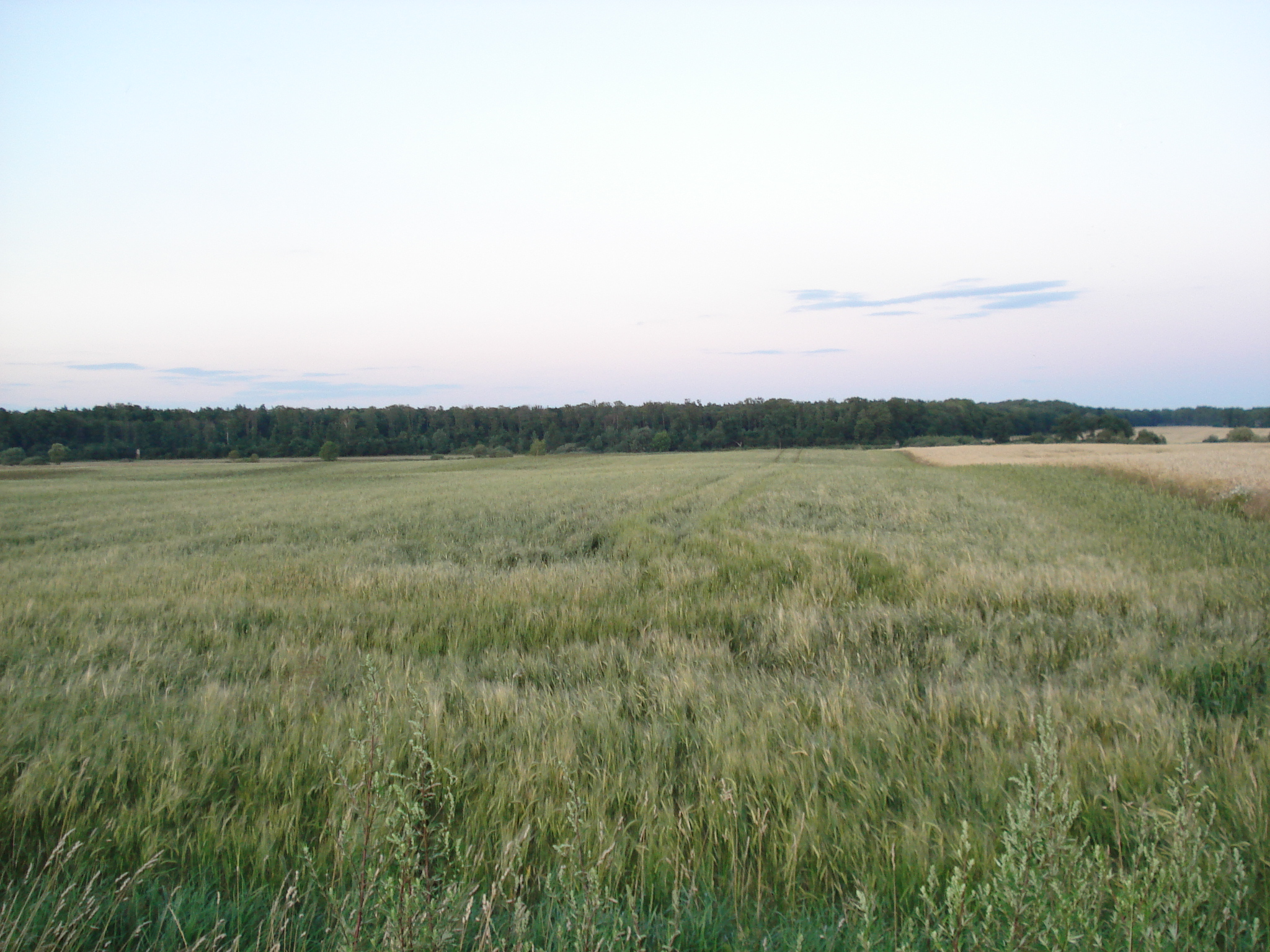

- Location within Poland
- Coordinates: 50°38′N 23°57′E
- Country: Poland
- Voivodeship: Lublin
- County: Hrubieszów
- Gmina: Mircze
- Time zone: UTC+1 (CET)
  - Summer (DST): UTC+2 (CEST)
- Vehicle registration: LHR

Smoligów [smɔˈliɡuf] is a village in the administrative district of Gmina Mircze, within Hrubieszów County, Lublin Voivodeship, in eastern Poland, close to the border with Ukraine.

== History ==
During the German occupation (World War II), on 27 March 1944, the village was pacified by the Germans and Ukrainian collaborators in reprisal for the villagers support for the Peasant Battalions Polish resistance organization. The number of victims is estimated between 66 and 232. There is a memorial in the village.
