= Sieradowice Landscape Park =

Protected area in Poland

Coordinates: 51.0279°N 20.9633°E

- Sieradowicki Park Krajobrazowy
- IUCN category V (protected landscape/seascape)
- Interactive map of Sieradowice Landscape Park
- Location: Świętokrzyskie Voivodeship
- Area: 121.06 km^{2} (46.74 sq mi)

Sieradowice Landscape Park (Sieradowicki Park Krajobrazowy) is a protected area (Landscape Park) located in south-central Poland, covering an area of 121.06 square kilometres (46.74 sq mi).

The Park lies within Świętokrzyskie Voivodeship: in Kielce County (Gmina Bodzentyn), Skarżysko County (Gmina Suchedniów) and Starachowice County (Gmina Pawłów, Gmina Wąchock).

In this park are three nature reserves.
