= Rajsk =

- Village
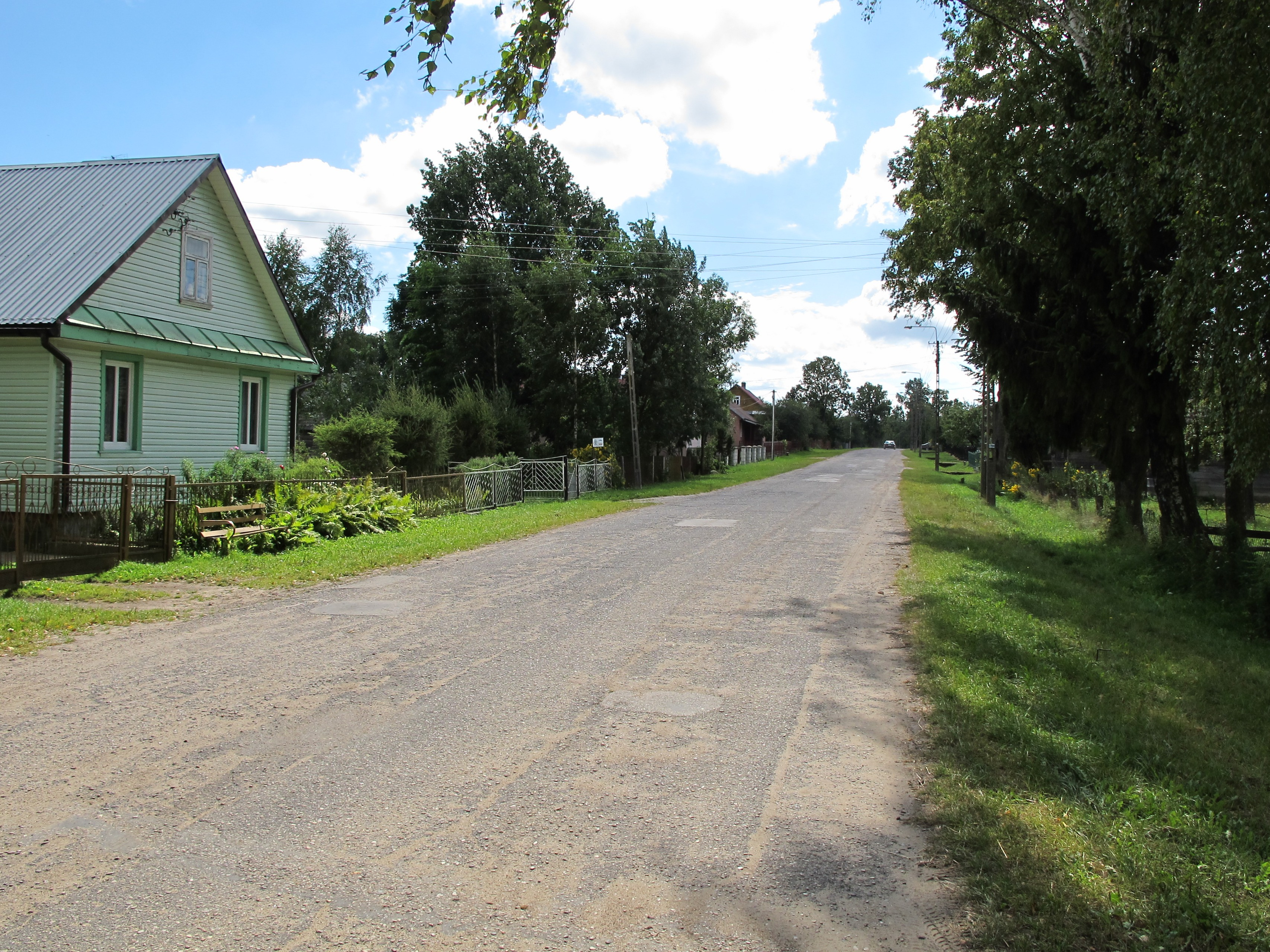

- Location within Poland
- Coordinates: 52°51′N 23°9′E
- Country: Poland
- Voivodeship: Podlaskie
- County: Bielsk
- Gmina: Bielsk Podlaski
- Time zone: UTC+1 (CET)
  - Summer (DST): UTC+2 (CEST)
- Vehicle registration: BBI

Rajsk [rai̯sk] is a village in the administrative district of Gmina Bielsk Podlaski, within Bielsk County, Podlaskie Voivodeship, in north-eastern Poland.

== History ==
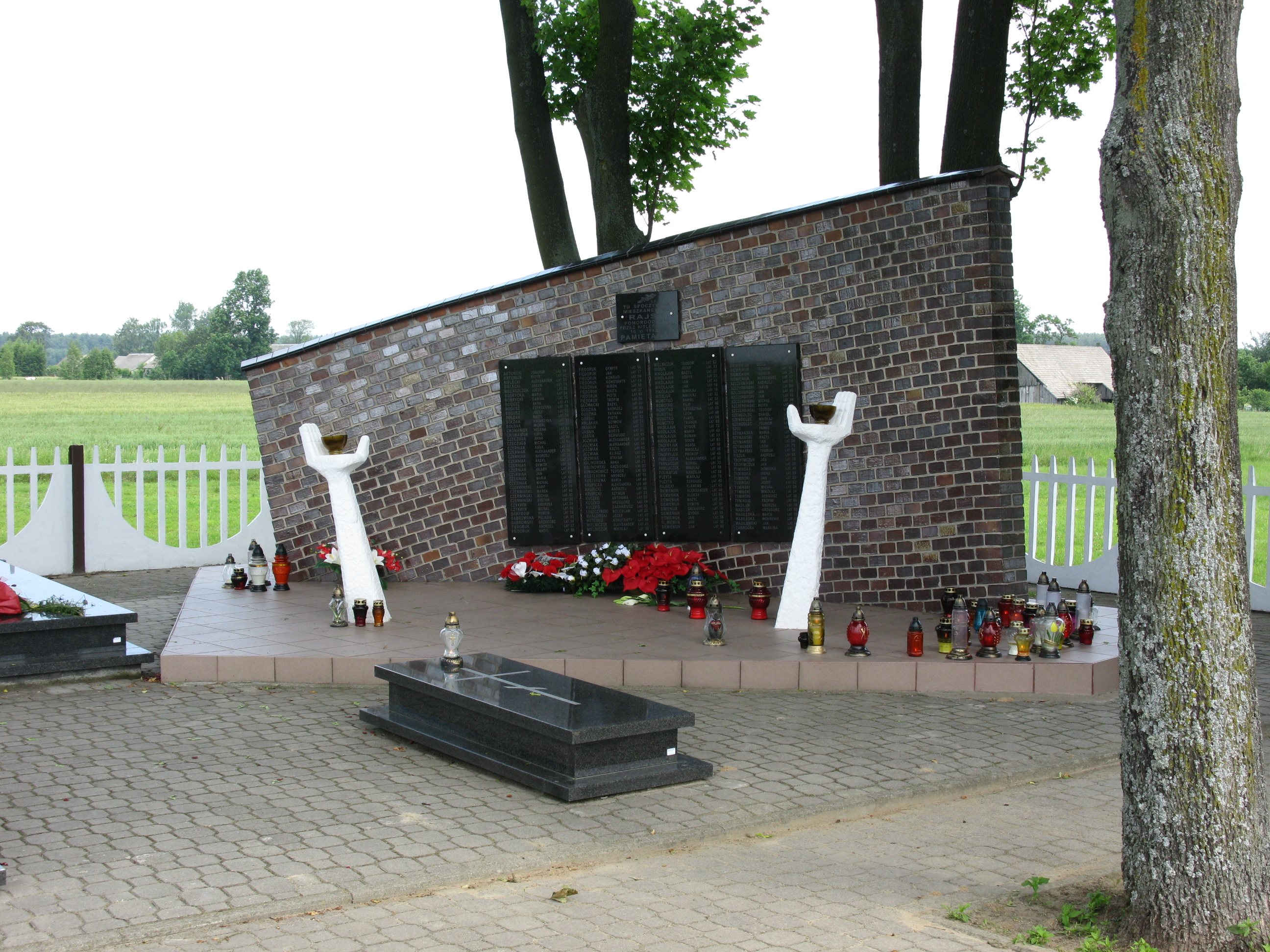
Mass grave of the victims of the German massacre

According to the 1921 census, the village was inhabited by 341 people, among whom 15 were Roman Catholic, 322 Orthodox, and 4 Jewish. At the same time, 196 inhabitants declared Polish nationality, 145 Belarusian. There were 71 residential buildings in the village.

Following the joint German-Soviet invasion of Poland, which started World War II in September 1939, the village was first occupied by the Soviet Union until 1941, and then by Germany until 1944. On July 16, 1942, on the order of regional SS and Police Leader Werner Fromm, the German gendarmerie, SS and Wehrmacht pacified the village, murdering 142 people. The Germans burned down houses, farm buildings and the church, and destroyed access roads to erase traces of the village's existence.
