= Gmina Suchedniów =

Gmina Suchedniów Suchedniów Commune
- Gmina
- Coat of arms
- Interactive map of Gmina Suchedniów
- Coordinates (Suchedniów): 51°3′6″N 20°49′57″E
- Country: Poland
- Voivodeship: Świętokrzyskie
- County: Skarżysko
- Seat: Suchedniów

Area
  - Total: 74.94 km^{2} (28.93 sq mi)

Population (2006)
  - Total: 10,843
  - Density: 144.7/km^{2} (374.7/sq mi)
  - Urban: 8,911
  - Rural: 1,932
- Website: http://www.suchedniow.pl

Gmina Suchedniów is an urban-rural gmina (administrative district) in Skarżysko County, Świętokrzyskie Voivodeship, in south-central Poland. Its seat is the town of Suchedniów, which lies approximately 10 kilometres (6 mi) south-west of Skarżysko-Kamienna and 25 km (16 mi) north-east of the regional capital Kielce.

The gmina covers an area of 74.94 square kilometres (28.9 sq mi), and as of 2006 its total population is 10,843 (out of which the population of Suchedniów amounts to 8,911, and the population of the rural part of the gmina is 1,932).

The gmina contains parts of the protected areas called Sieradowice Landscape Park and Suchedniów-Oblęgorek Landscape Park.

== Villages ==
Apart from the town of Suchedniów, Gmina Suchedniów contains the villages and settlements of Krzyżka, Michniów, Mostki and Ostojów.

== Neighbouring gminas ==
Gmina Suchedniów is bordered by the town of Skarżysko-Kamienna and by the gminas of Bliżyn, Bodzentyn, Łączna and Wąchock.
