= Wzdół Rządowy =

- Village
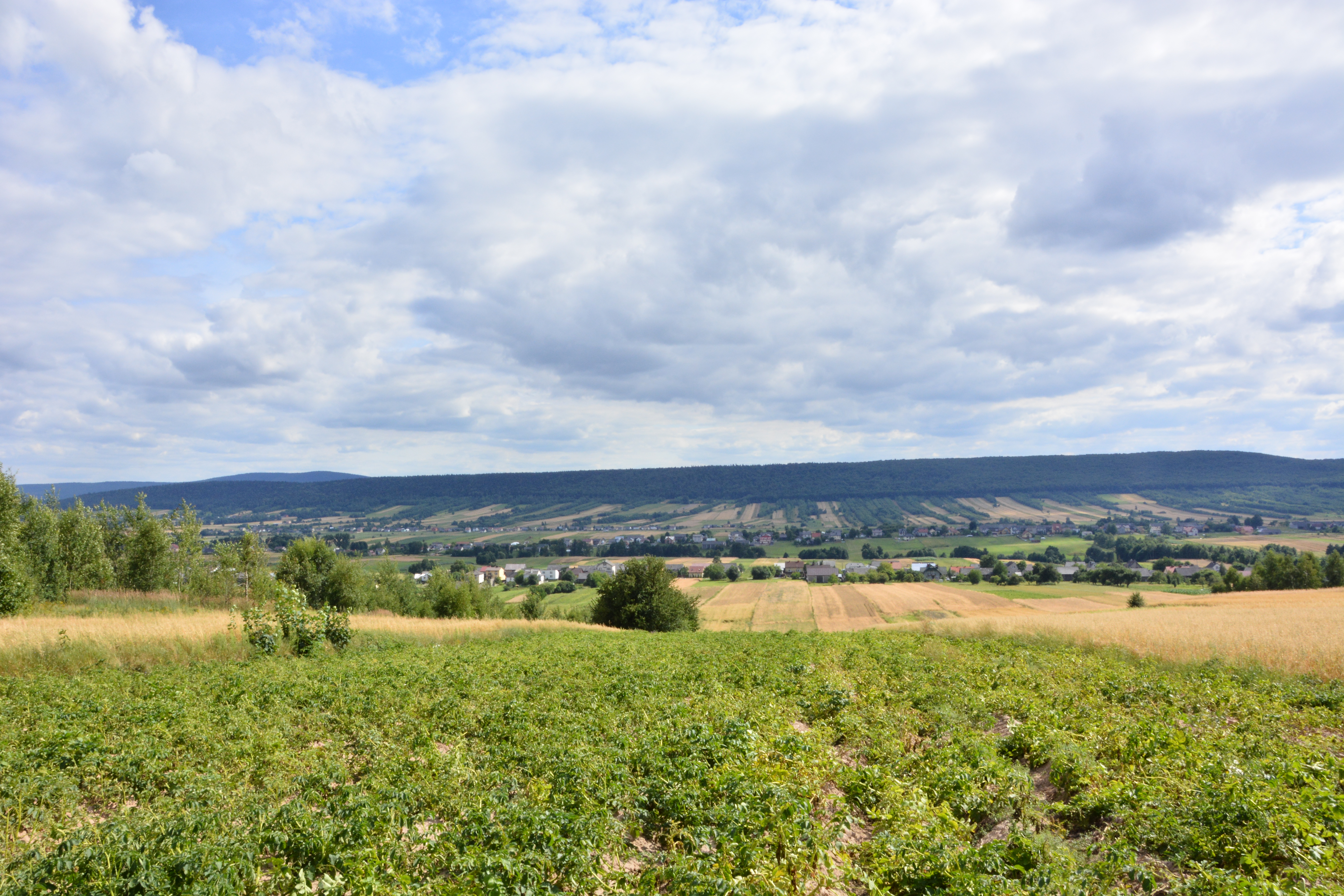

- Location within Poland
- Coordinates: 50°58′54″N 20°51′50″E
- Country: Poland
- Voivodeship: Świętokrzyskie
- County: Kielce
- Gmina: Bodzentyn
- Population: 550

Wzdół Rządowy [ˈvzduu̯ ʐɔnˈdɔvɨ] is a village in the administrative district of Gmina Bodzentyn, within Kielce County, Świętokrzyskie Voivodeship, in south-central Poland. It lies approximately 8 km (5 mi) north-west of Bodzentyn and 21 km (13 mi) north-east of the regional capital Kielce.
