= Michniów =

- Village
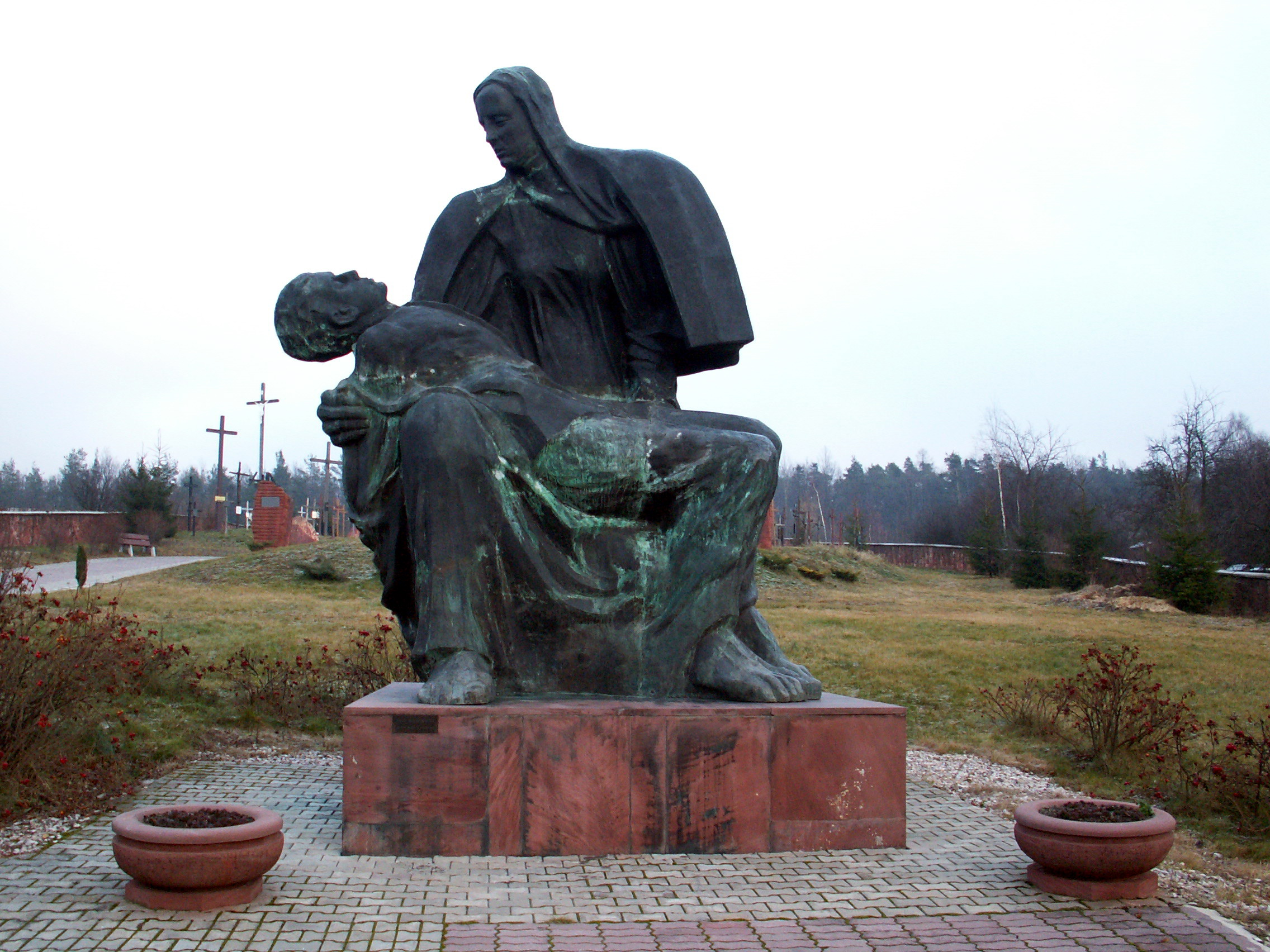
- Mausoleum to victims of pacification

- Location within Poland
- Coordinates: 51°0′29″N 20°50′38″E
- Country: Poland
- Voivodeship: Świętokrzyskie
- County: Skarżysko
- Gmina: Suchedniów
- Population: 440

Michniów pronounced [ˈmixɲuf] is a village in the administrative district of Gmina Suchedniów, within Skarżysko County, Świętokrzyskie Voivodeship, in south-central Poland. It lies approximately 5 km (3 mi) south of Suchedniów, 14 km (9 mi) south-west of Skarżysko-Kamienna, and 22 km (14 mi) north-east of the regional capital Kielce.

== Michniów massacre ==
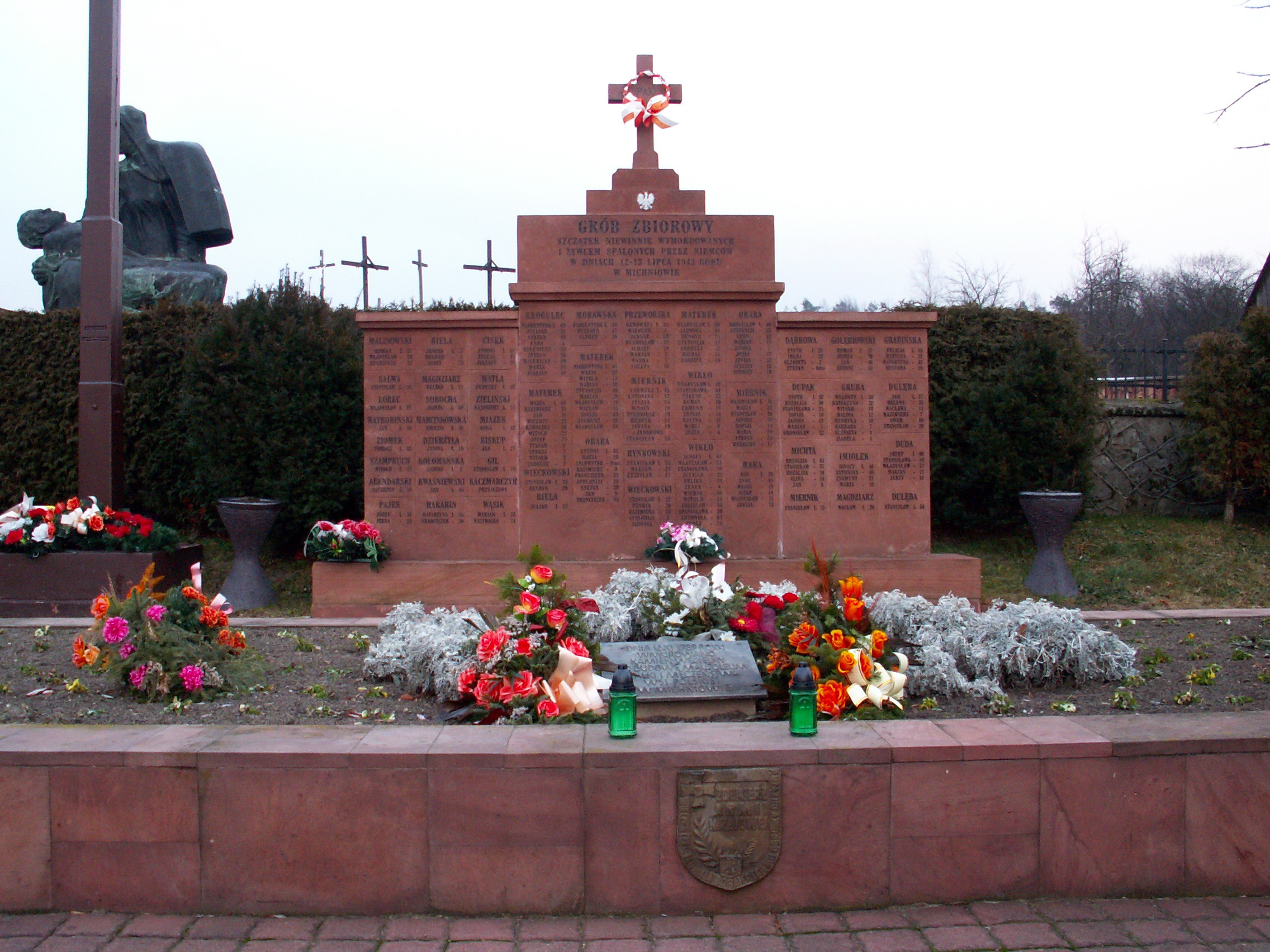
Mass grave of Michniów massacre victims

During World War II, the region of Michniów was occupied by the Germans from September 1939 until January 1945. Under the occupation, it was one of the local centres of the Polish underground resistance movement. On 12–13 July 1943, the population of Michniów was massacred by the German Police units of the 17th and the 22nd Police Regiments, commanded by Hauptmann Gerulf Mayer, in punishment for the partisan activity in the area. In the first massacre, on 12 July 1943, 98 men were burned alive locked in barns. The same night, the partisans headed by Jan Piwnik "Ponury", made a retaliatory assault on a German train from Kraków to Warsaw. The Germans returned to the village the next day and committed a second punitive massacre. During two days, at least 203 inhabitants were killed: 103 men, 53 women and 47 children. After ad hoc investigation, a further 11 persons, the only ones suspected by the Germans of underground activities, were sent to Auschwitz concentration camp, where 6 died. The village was then completely burned.

After the war, Michniów was resettled again. The village became one of the best-known symbols of the Nazi German atrocities committed in rural Poland, although there were several greater massacres. From early 1980s, on the initiative of the Główna Komisja Badania Zbrodni Hitlerowskich w Polsce a museum and a mausoleum to all Polish pacified villages was built in Michniów.
