= Kitów =

Village in Poland

- Village
- Location within Poland
- Coordinates: 50°48′N 22°56′E
- Country: Poland
- Voivodeship: Lublin
- County: Zamość
- Gmina: Sułów

Kitów [ˈkituf] is a village in the administrative district of Gmina Sułów, within Zamość County, Lublin Voivodeship, in eastern Poland.

== History ==
During the Nazi occupation of Poland, on December 11, 1942, a minimum of 164 inhabitants of Kitów, including numerous women and children, were massacred by the German punitive expedition.
