= Suchedniów =

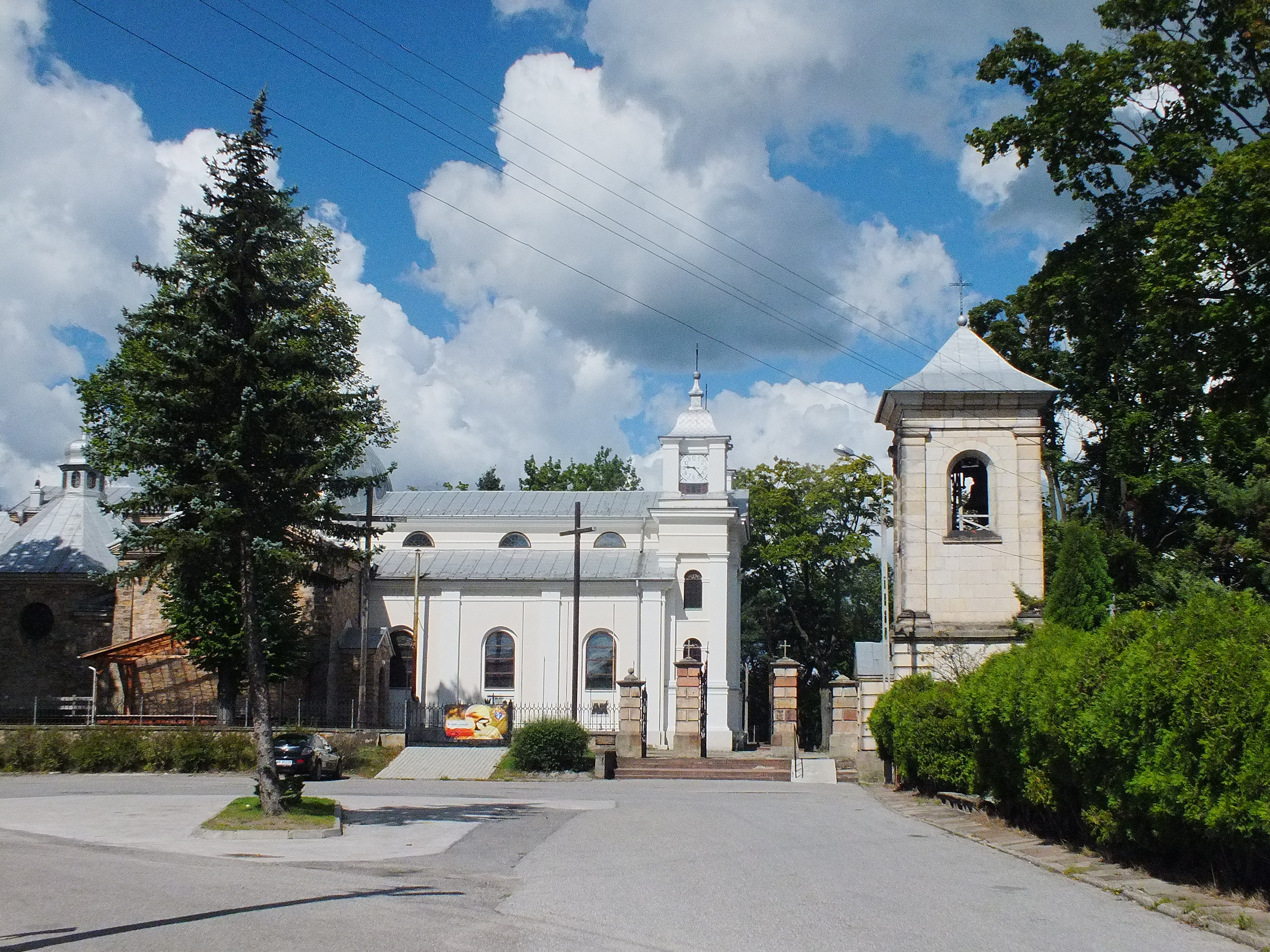
- Church of Saint Andrew

- Coat of arms

- Location within Poland
- Coordinates: 51°3′6″N 20°49′57″E
- Country: Poland
- Voivodeship: Świętokrzyskie
- County: Skarżysko
- Gmina: Suchedniów
- Established: 16th century
- Town rights: 1962

Government
  - Mayor: Dariusz Miernik (Ind.)

Area
  - Total: 59.40 km^{2} (22.93 sq mi)

Population (2012)
  - Total: 8,773
  - Density: 147.7/km^{2} (382.5/sq mi)
- Time zone: UTC+1 (CET)
  - Summer (DST): UTC+2 (CEST)
- Postal code: 26-130
- Area code: +48 41
- Car plates: TSK
- Website: http://www.suchedniow.pl

Suchedniów [suˈxɛdɲuf] is a town in Skarżysko County, Świętokrzyskie Voivodeship, Poland, with 9,067 inhabitants (2004). It is the seat of the urban-rural district Gmina Suchedniów.
