= Kamionki =

Kamionki may refer to the following places:

- Kamionki, Greater Poland Voivodeship (west-central Poland)
- Kamionki, Masovian Voivodeship (east-central Poland)
- Kamionki, Świętokrzyskie Voivodeship (south-central Poland)
- Kamionki, Pomeranian Voivodeship (north Poland)
- Kamionki, Giżycko County in Warmian-Masurian Voivodeship (north Poland)
- Kamionki, Gołdap County in Warmian-Masurian Voivodeship (north Poland)
- Kamionki, West Pomeranian Voivodeship (north-west Poland)
