= Zaskale, Świętokrzyskie Voivodeship =

Zaskale
- Village
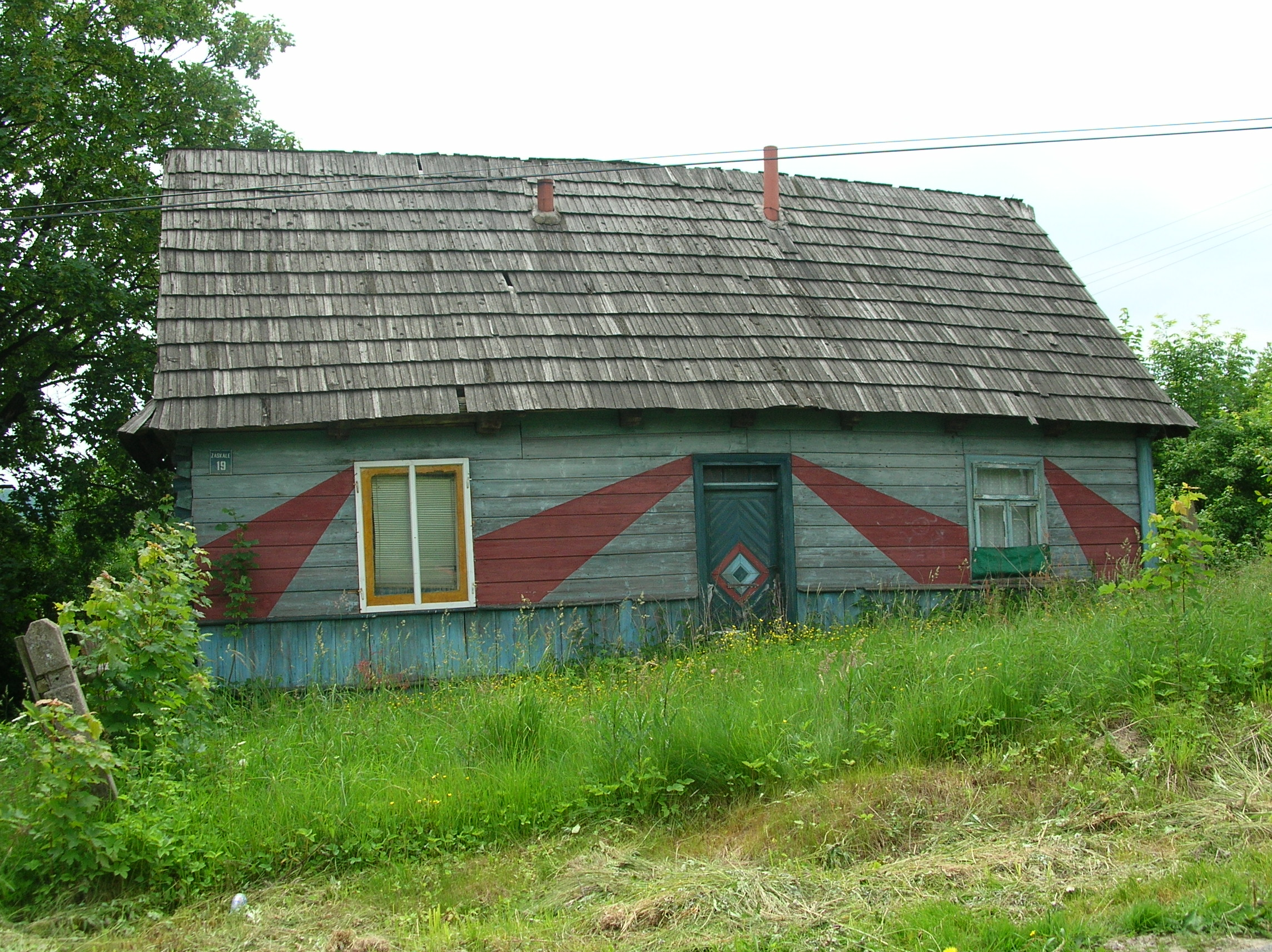
- Cottage in Zaskale

- Location within Poland
- Coordinates: 50°58′45″N 20°49′26″E
- Country: Poland
- Voivodeship: Świętokrzyskie
- County: Skarżysko
- Gmina: Łączna
- Population: 250

Zaskale [zasˈkalɛ] is a village in the administrative district of Gmina Łączna, within Skarżysko County, Świętokrzyskie Voivodeship, in south-central Poland. It lies approximately 3 km (2 mi) south-east of Łączna, 17 km (11 mi) south-west of Skarżysko-Kamienna, and 19 km (12 mi) north-east of the regional capital Kielce.
