= Klonów, Świętokrzyskie Voivodeship =

Klonów
- Village
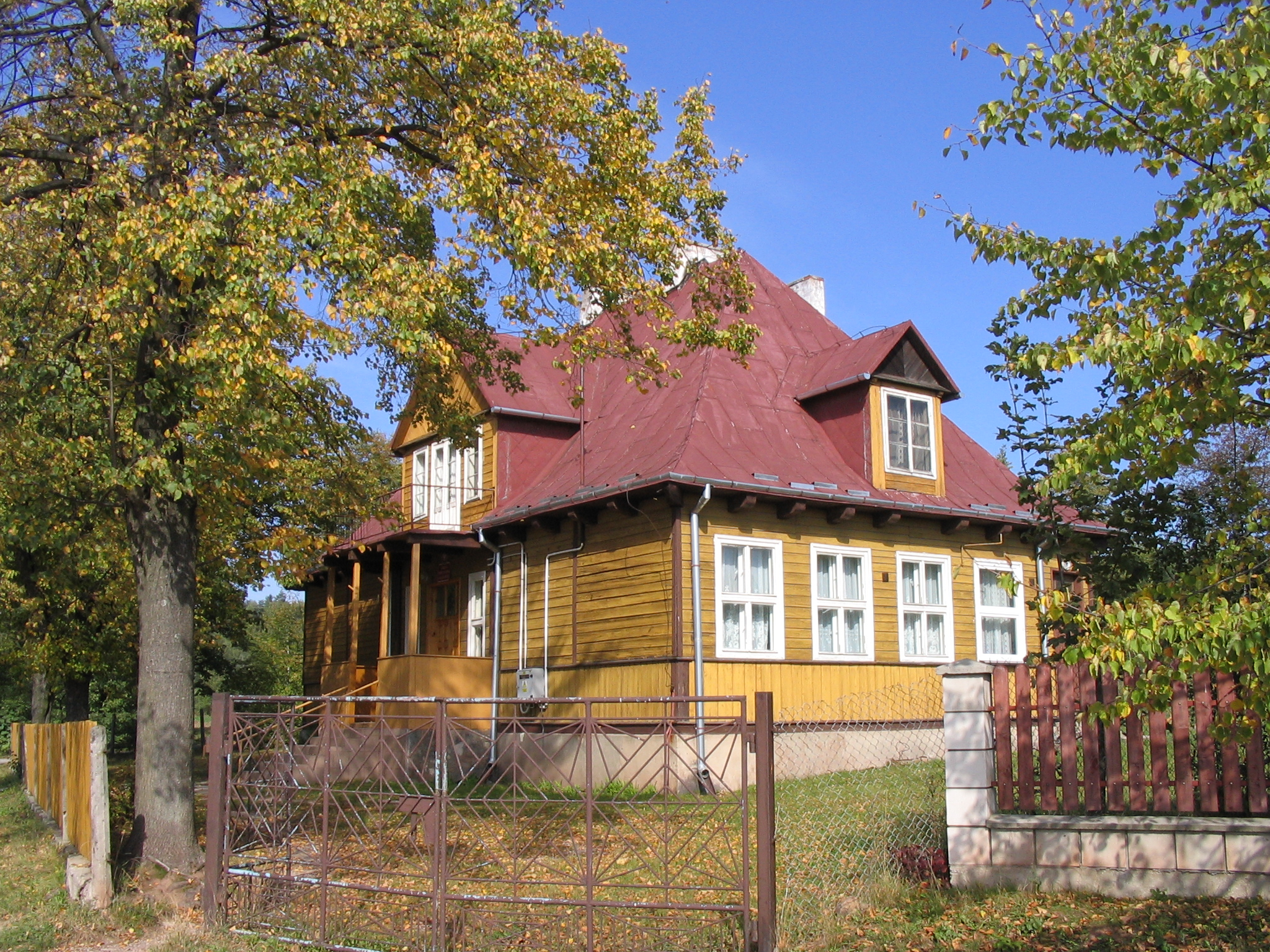
- School

- Location within Poland
- Coordinates: 50°57′0″N 20°49′1″E
- Country: Poland
- Voivodeship: Świętokrzyskie
- County: Skarżysko
- Gmina: Łączna
- Population: 270

Klonów [ˈklɔnuf] is a village in the administrative district of Gmina Łączna, within Skarżysko County, Świętokrzyskie Voivodeship, in south-central Poland. It lies approximately 6 km (4 mi) south-east of Łączna, 20 km (12 mi) south of Skarżysko-Kamienna, and 16 km (10 mi) north-east of the regional capital Kielce.
