= Osełków =

- Village
- Location within Poland
- Coordinates: 51°0′9″N 20°48′36″E
- Country: Poland
- Voivodeship: Świętokrzyskie
- County: Skarżysko
- Gmina: Łączna

Osełków [ɔˈsɛu̯kuf] is a village in the administrative district of Gmina Łączna, within Skarżysko County, Świętokrzyskie Voivodeship, in south-central Poland. It lies approximately 2 km (1 mi) north-east of Łączna, 15 km (9 mi) south-west of Skarżysko-Kamienna, and 19 km (12 mi) north-east of the regional capital Kielce.
