= Dziarnowo =

Dziarnowo may refer to the following places in Poland:

- Dziarnowo, Masovian Voivodeship
- Dziarnowo, Kuyavian-Pomeranian Voivodeship
