= Gózd, Świętokrzyskie Voivodeship =

Gózd
- Village
- Location within Poland
- Coordinates: 50°59′16″N 20°46′35″E
- Country: Poland
- Voivodeship: Świętokrzyskie
- County: Skarżysko
- Gmina: Łączna
- Population: 560

Gózd [ɡust] is a village in the administrative district of Gmina Łączna, within Skarżysko County, Świętokrzyskie Voivodeship, in south-central Poland. It lies approximately 2 km (1 mi) south-west of Łączna, 18 km (11 mi) south-west of Skarżysko-Kamienna, and 17 km (11 mi) north-east of the regional capital Kielce.

North of Gózd at 50°58′57.6″N 20°44′47.1″E there is a 104 metres tall free-standing lattice tower used as radio relay.
