= Zagórze, Gmina Łączna =

Zagórze
- Village
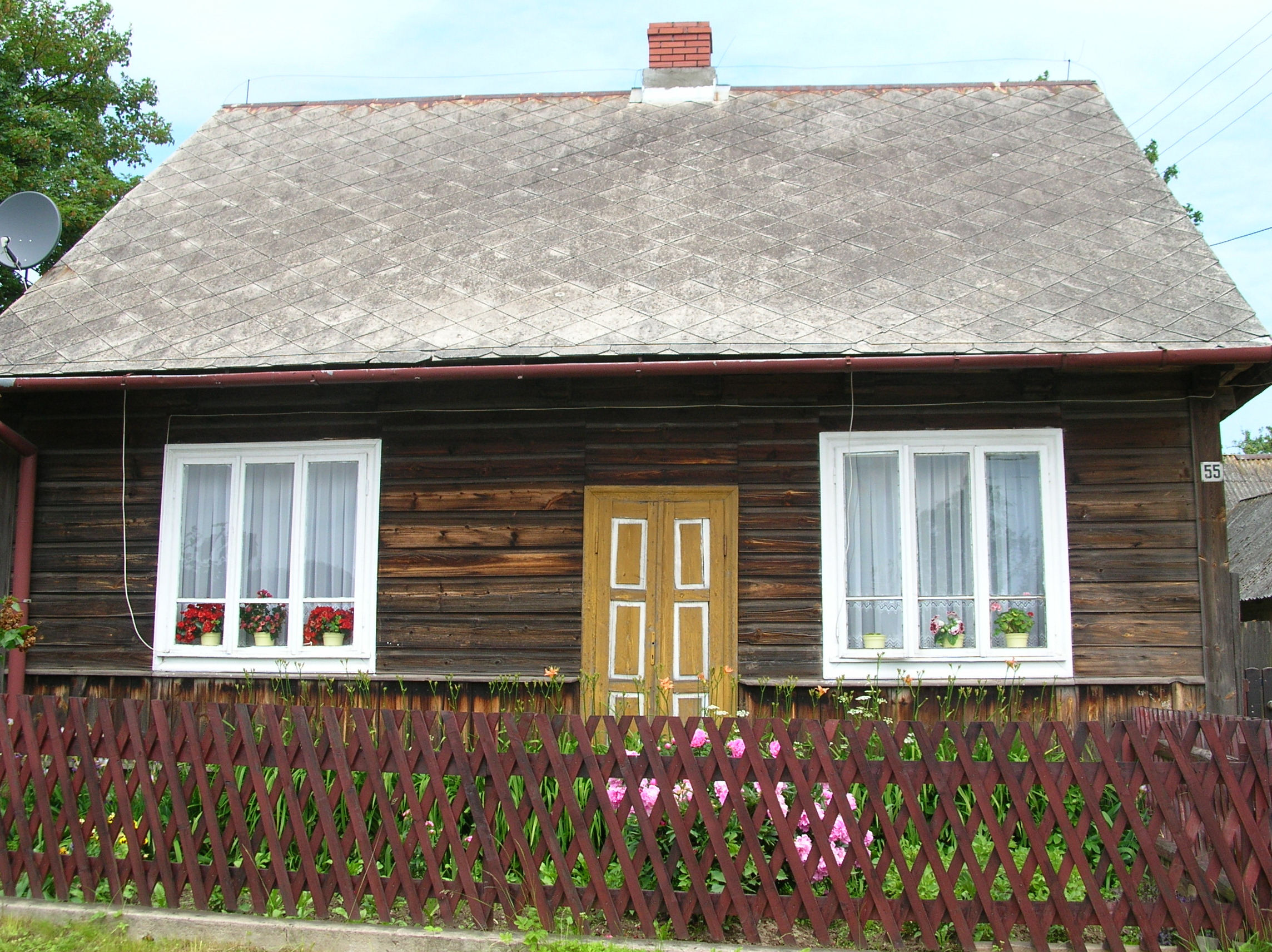
- Cottage in Zagórze

- Location within Poland
- Coordinates: 50°58′22″N 20°49′11″E
- Country: Poland
- Voivodeship: Świętokrzyskie
- County: Skarżysko
- Gmina: Łączna

Zagórze [zaˈɡuʐɛ] is a village in the administrative district of Gmina Łączna, within Skarżysko County, Świętokrzyskie Voivodeship, in south-central Poland. It lies approximately 4 km (2 mi) south-east of Łączna, 18 km (11 mi) south-west of Skarżysko-Kamienna, and 18 km (11 mi) north-east of the regional capital Kielce.
