= Podłazie, Skarżysko County =

Podłazie
- Village
- Location within Poland
- Coordinates: 50°59′28″N 20°49′41″E
- Country: Poland
- Voivodeship: Świętokrzyskie
- County: Skarżysko
- Gmina: Łączna
- Population: 460

Podłazie [pɔdˈwaʑɛ] is a village in the administrative district of Gmina Łączna, within Skarżysko County, Świętokrzyskie Voivodeship, in south-central Poland. It lies approximately 3 km (2 mi) east of Łączna, 16 km (10 mi) south-west of Skarżysko-Kamienna, and 20 km (12 mi) north-east of the regional capital Kielce.
