= Podzagnańszcze =

- Village
- Location within Poland
- Coordinates: 50°59′23″N 20°48′32″E
- Country: Poland
- Voivodeship: Świętokrzyskie
- County: Skarżysko
- Gmina: Łączna

Podzagnańszcze [pɔd͡zaɡˈnaɲʂt͡ʂɛ] is a village in the administrative district of Gmina Łączna, within Skarżysko County, Świętokrzyskie Voivodeship, in south-central Poland. It lies approximately 2 km (1 mi) east of Łączna, 16 km (10 mi) south-west of Skarżysko-Kamienna, and 18 km (11 mi) north-east of the regional capital Kielce.
