= Występa =

- Village
- Location within Poland
- Coordinates: 50°58′51″N 20°44′35″E
- Country: Poland
- Voivodeship: Świętokrzyskie
- County: Skarżysko
- Gmina: Łączna
- Population: 380

Występa [vɨsˈtɛmpa] is a village in the administrative district of Gmina Łączna, within Skarżysko County, Świętokrzyskie Voivodeship, in south-central Poland. It lies approximately 4 km (2 mi) west of Łączna, 20 km (12 mi) south-west of Skarżysko-Kamienna, and 14 km (9 mi) north-east of the regional capital Kielce.
