= Jęgrzna =

- Village
- Location within Poland
- Coordinates: 50°59′8″N 20°46′52″E
- Country: Poland
- Voivodeship: Świętokrzyskie
- County: Skarżysko
- Gmina: Łączna
- Population: 490

Jęgrzna [ˈjɛnɡʐna] is a village in the administrative district of Gmina Łączna, within Skarżysko County, Świętokrzyskie Voivodeship, in south-central Poland. It lies approximately 1 km (1 mi) south-west of Łączna, 18 km (11 mi) south-west of Skarżysko-Kamienna, and 17 km (11 mi) north-east of the regional capital Kielce.
