= Kobierniki, Masovian Voivodeship =

Kobierniki
- Village
- Location within Poland
- Coordinates: 52°37′N 19°35′E
- Country: Poland
- Voivodeship: Masovian
- County: Płock
- Gmina: Stara Biała

Population
  - Total: 250
- Time zone: UTC+1 (CET)
  - Summer (DST): UTC+2 (CEST)
- Vehicle registration: WPL

Kobierniki [kɔbjɛrˈniki] is a village in the administrative district of Gmina Stara Biała, within Płock County, Masovian Voivodeship, in central Poland.
