= Srebrna, Płock County =

Srebrna
- Village
- Location within Poland
- Coordinates: 52°38′N 19°37′E
- Country: Poland
- Voivodeship: Masovian
- County: Płock
- Gmina: Stara Biała
- Postal code: 09-411

Srebrna [ˈsrɛbrna] is a village in the administrative district of Gmina Stara Biała, within Płock County, Masovian Voivodeship, in central Poland.
