= Maszewo Duże =

- Village
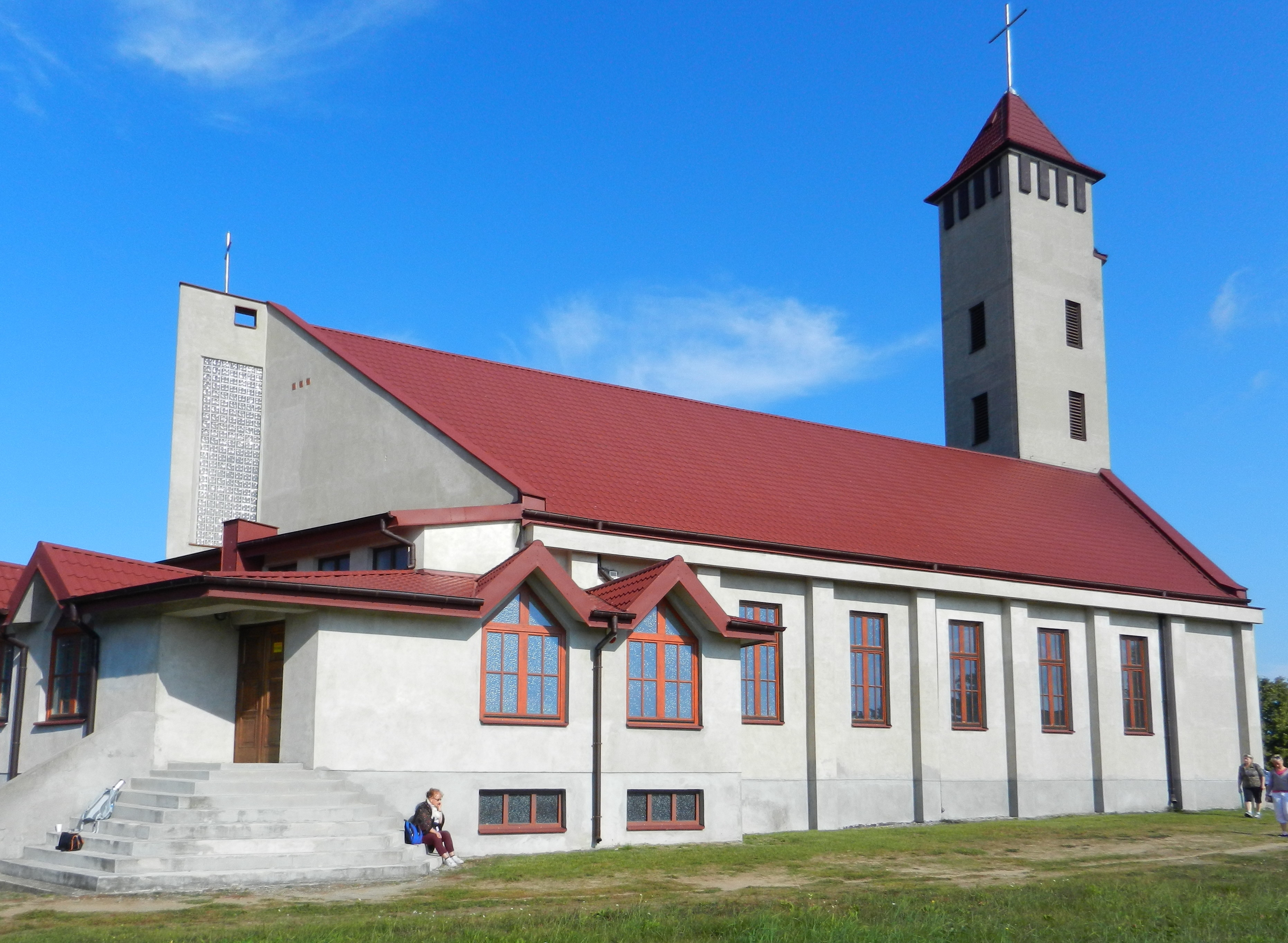
- Church in Maszewo Duże

- Location within Poland
- Coordinates: 52°34′N 19°37′E
- Country: Poland
- Voivodeship: Masovian
- County: Płock
- Gmina: Stara Biała

Population
  - Total: 1,400
- Time zone: UTC+1 (CET)
  - Summer (DST): UTC+2 (CEST)
- Vehicle registration: WPL

Maszewo Duże [maˈʂɛvɔ ˈduʐɛ] is a village in the administrative district of Gmina Stara Biała, within Płock County, Masovian Voivodeship, in central Poland.
