= Brwilno, Gmina Stara Biała =

Brwilno
- Village
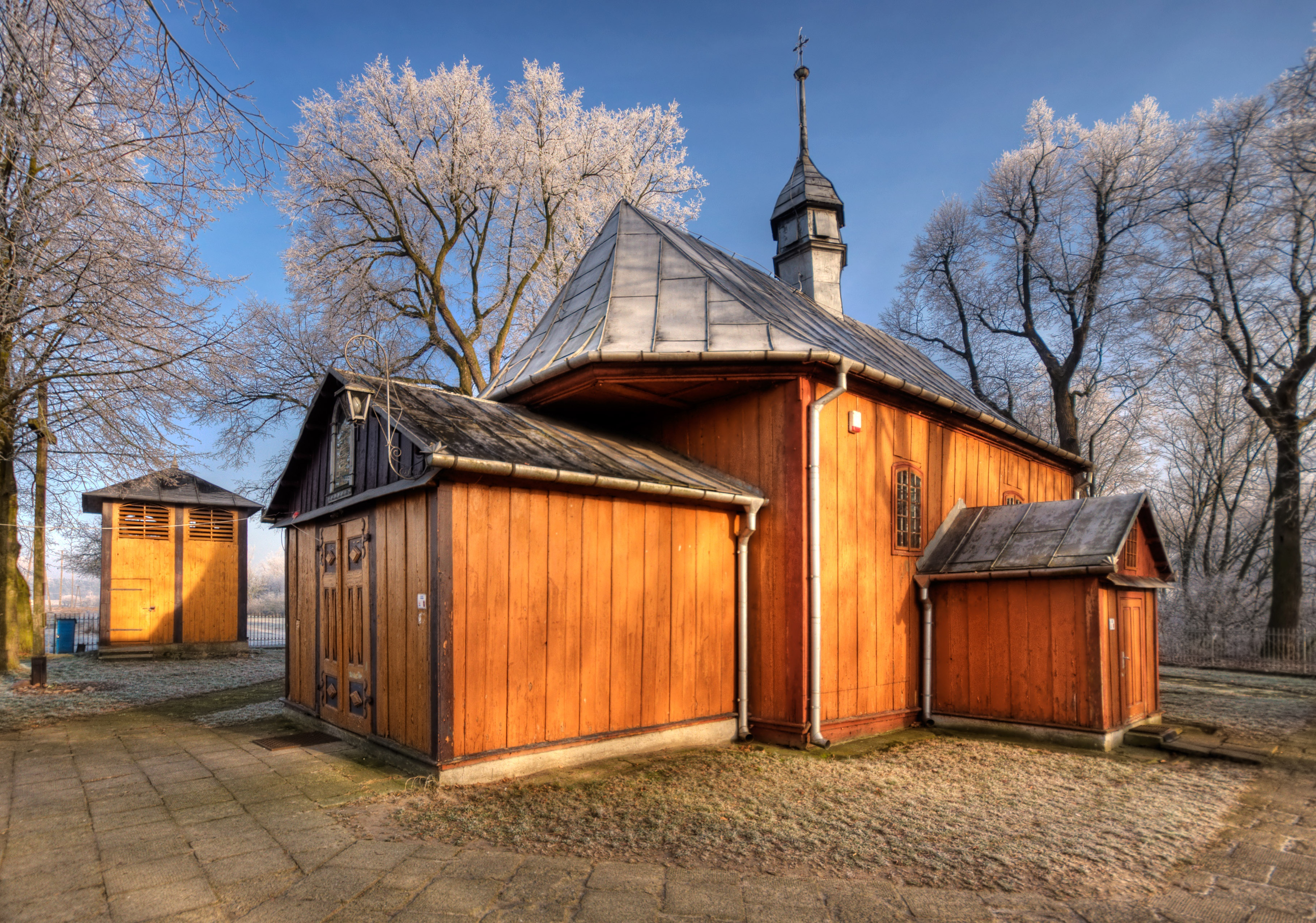
- Wooden church in Brwilno (18th century)

- Location within Poland
- Coordinates: 52°34′0″N 19°36′0″E
- Country: Poland
- Voivodeship: Masovian
- County: Płock
- Gmina: Stara Biała
- Time zone: UTC+1 (CET)
  - Summer (DST): UTC+2 (CEST)
- Vehicle registration: WPL

Brwilno [ˈbrvilnɔ] is a village in the administrative district of Gmina Stara Biała, within Płock County, Masovian Voivodeship, in central Poland. The village is on the eastern bank of the Vistula River.

== History ==
Archaeology suggests that the site of the town was inhabited by the Lusatian cultural group, dating from the Neolithic period, through the Bronze Age and into the Early Iron Age. There is also a burial ground of the Pomeranian culture dated to the early Iron Age.

The current village has relics from the early Middle Ages.

The village church building was built in 1740 and dedicated to Saint St Andrew the Apostle and, consecrated in 1787 by Bishop of Płock Wojciech Józef Gadomski. The western porch of the church was built in the 19th century and the side altar, is of late Renaissance period around 1630, originally in the Franciscan church from Dobrzyń on the Vistula. The lintel at the sacristy has a foundation inscription "IR MK PP", probably referring to Mateusz Krzemiński, and 1740. On the rood beam there is a late-Gothic sculpture of Crucified Christ from the first half of the 16th century.

The church belfry dates from 1882, but it was constructed from beams from the previous belfry, dating from the mid-18th century. The bells were looted during the First World War by German troops.

In the churchyard there is a tombstone of the major of the Polish Army Officer, Wincenty Poznański, was buried in the churchyard during the first half of the 19th century.

A complex of buildings designed by Stefan Szyller for use as a Seminary were built in 1926–1927.

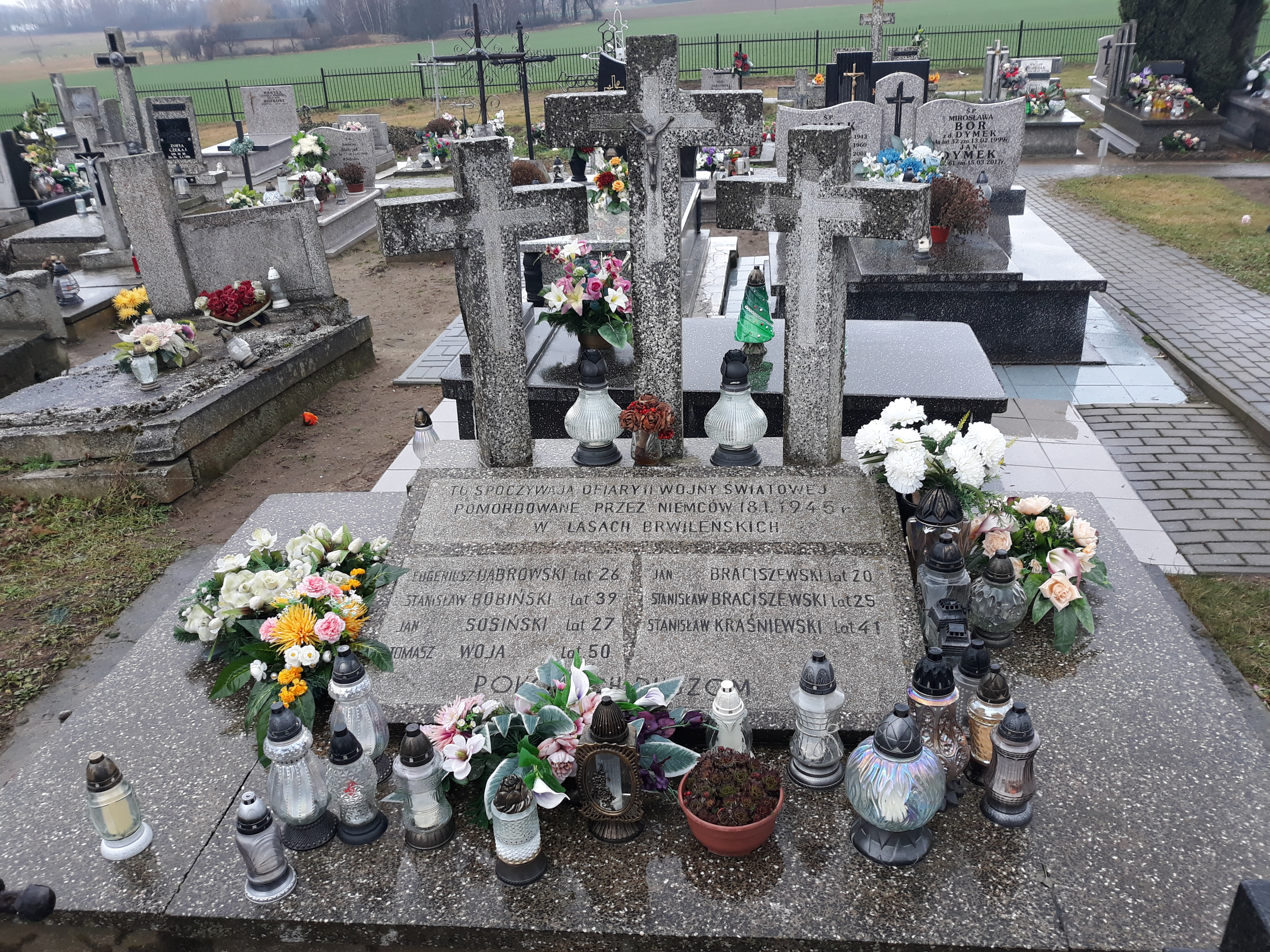
Mass grave of victims of Nazi Germany

During the German occupation in World War II, over 300 people from Płock and surrounding areas were executed in the nearby Brwile Woods. They were shot by the Nazi German occupiers in January 1940 and again on January 16 and 17, 1945. A memorial marks the location.
