= Bronowo Kmiece =

- Village
- Location within Poland
- Coordinates: 52°37′29″N 19°42′00″E
- Country: Poland
- Voivodeship: Masovian
- County: Płock
- Gmina: Stara Biała

Population (2011)
  - Total: 135
- Time zone: UTC+1 (CET)
  - Summer (DST): UTC+2 (CEST)
- Vehicle registration: WPL

Bronowo Kmiece [brɔˈnɔvɔ ˈkmjɛt͡sɛ] is a village in the administrative district of Gmina Stara Biała, within Płock County, Masovian Voivodeship, in central Poland.
