= Nowe Trzepowo =

- Village
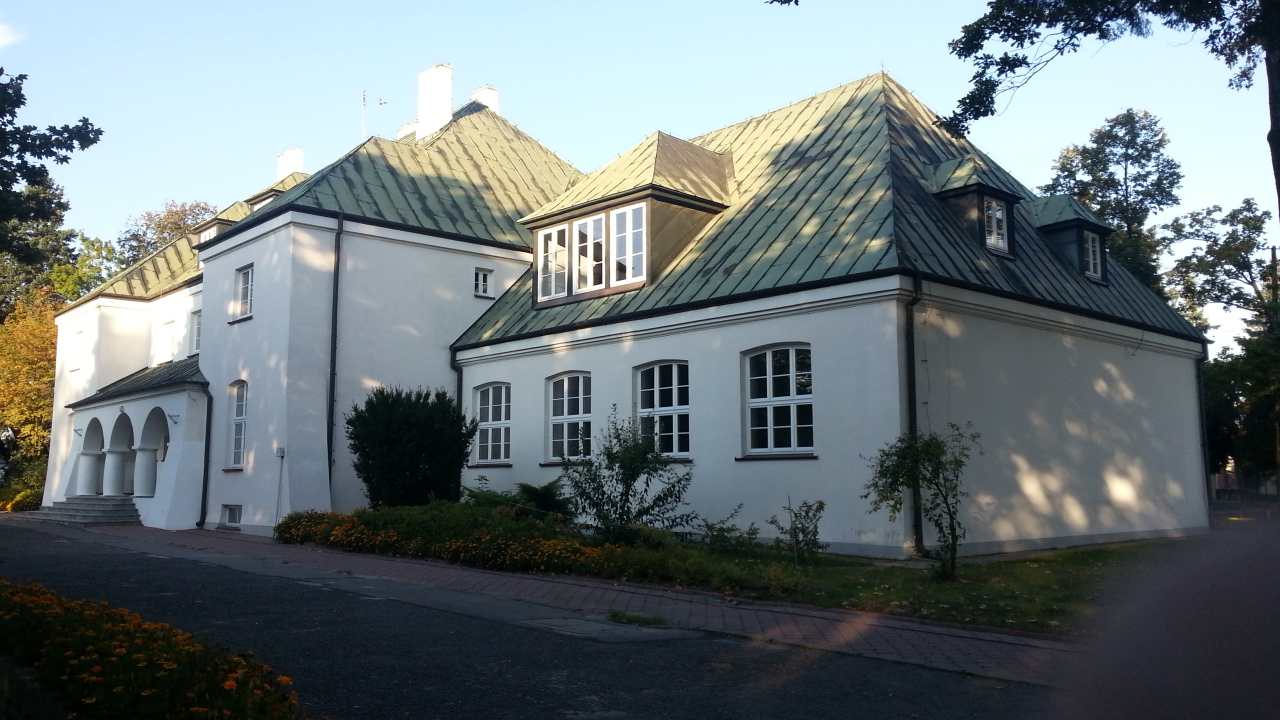
- School in Nowe Trzepowo

- Location within Poland
- Coordinates: 52°35′33″N 19°44′20″E
- Country: Poland
- Voivodeship: Masovian
- County: Płock
- Gmina: Stara Biała

Population
  - Total: 377 (2,011)
- Time zone: UTC+1 (CET)
  - Summer (DST): UTC+2 (CEST)
- Postal code: 09-402
- Vehicle registration: WPL

New Trzepowo [ˈnɔvɛ tʂɛˈpɔvɔ] is a village in the administrative district of Gmina Stara Biała, within Płock County, Masovian Voivodeship, in central Poland.

In 1975–1998, the town was administratively part of the Plock province.
