= Wyszyna, Masovian Voivodeship =

Wyszyna
- Village
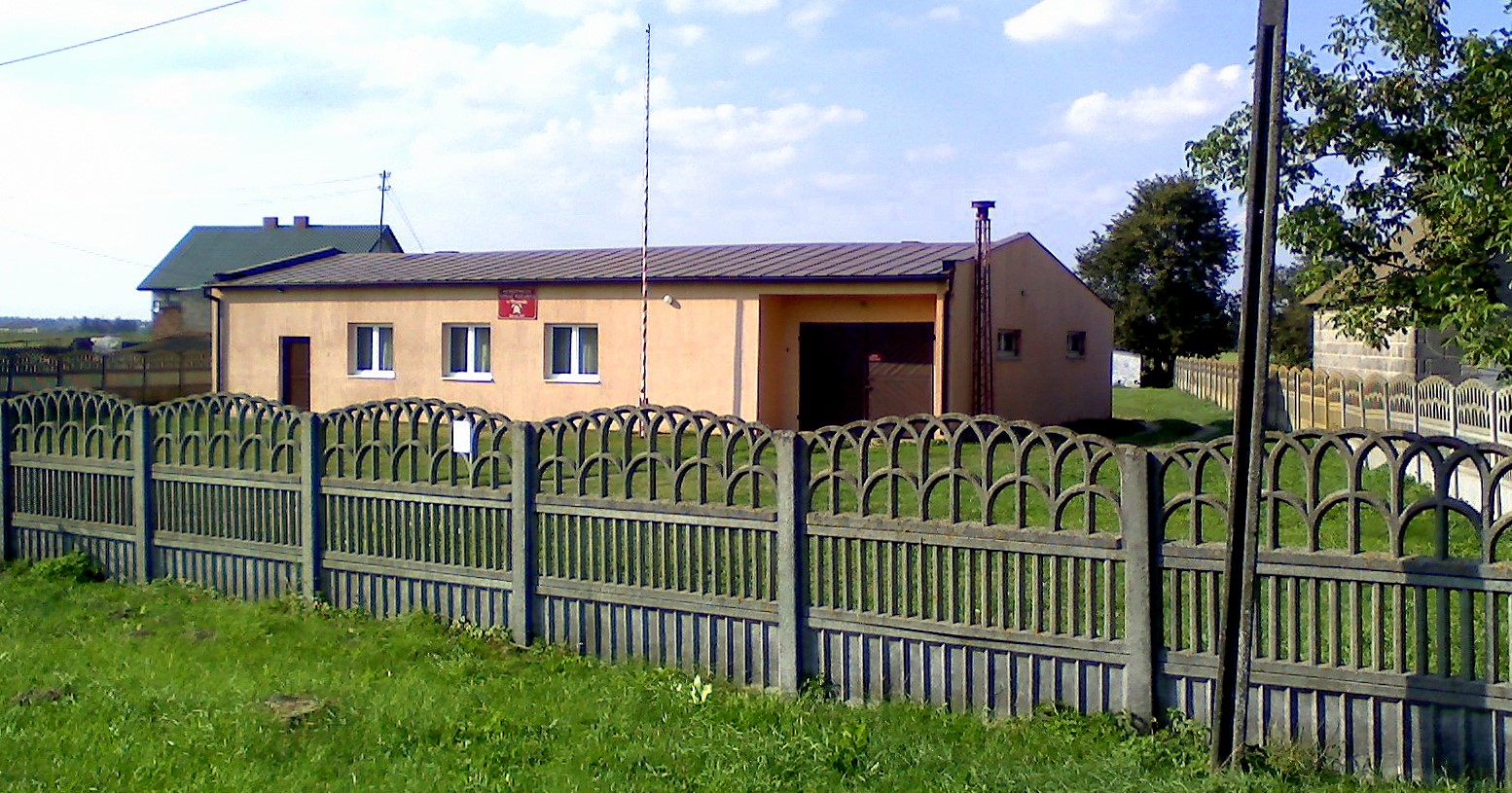
- Volunteer fire department

- Location within Poland
- Coordinates: 52°36′N 19°36′E
- Country: Poland
- Voivodeship: Masovian
- County: Płock
- Gmina: Stara Biała
- Time zone: UTC+1 (CET)
  - Summer (DST): UTC+2 (CEST)
- Postal code: 09-411
- Vehicle registration: WPL

Wyszyna [vɨˈʂɨna] is a village in the administrative district of Gmina Stara Biała, within Płock County, Masovian Voivodeship, in central Poland.
