= Kamionki, Świętokrzyskie Voivodeship =

Kamionki
- Village
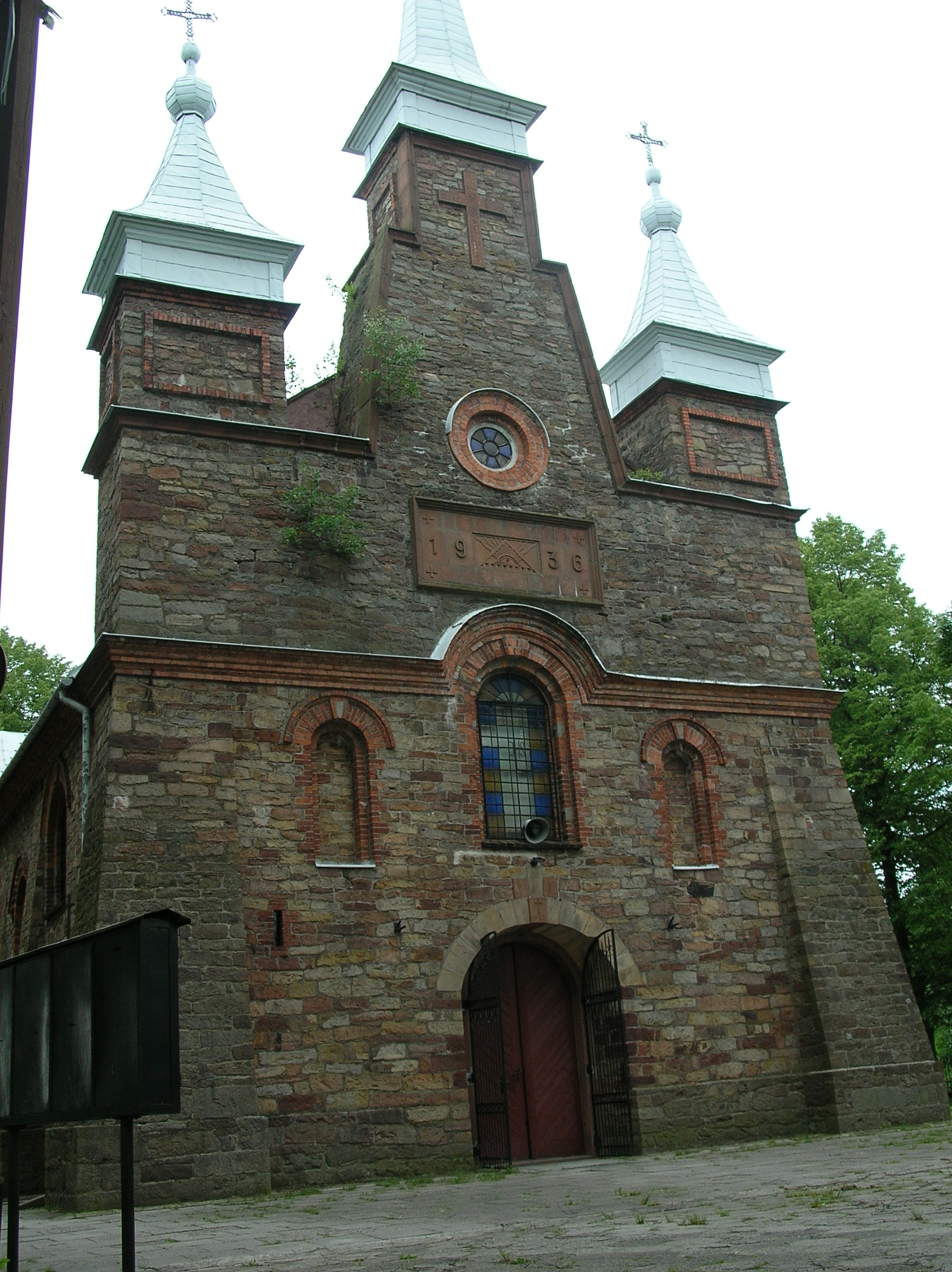
- Catholic church

- Location within Poland
- Coordinates: 50°59′49″N 20°48′19″E
- Country: Poland
- Voivodeship: Świętokrzyskie
- County: Skarżysko
- Gmina: Łączna

Kamionki [kaˈmjɔnki] is a village in the administrative district of Gmina Łączna, within Skarżysko County, Świętokrzyskie Voivodeship, in south-central Poland. It lies approximately 2 km (1 mi) east of Łączna, 16 km (10 mi) south-west of Skarżysko-Kamienna, and 19 km (12 mi) north-east of the regional capital Kielce.
