= Nowa Biała, Masovian Voivodeship =

Nowa Biała
- Village
- Location within Poland
- Coordinates: 52°35′26″N 19°38′32″E
- Country: Poland
- Voivodeship: Masovian
- County: Płock
- Gmina: Stara Biała
- Time zone: UTC+1 (CET)
  - Summer (DST): UTC+2 (CEST)
- Postal code: 09-411
- Vehicle registration: WPL

Nowa Biała [ˈnɔva ˈbjawa] is a village in the administrative district of Gmina Stara Biała, within Płock County, Masovian Voivodeship, in central Poland.

As of August 2025 Nowa Biała has a population of 310 people.

The village is located on a broad alluvial plain and is an important river crossing. The village is known for a series of large rocky outcrops on the river bank. The town has a school on the periphery, and at the center is a small shopping strip opposite a parish church.
