= Jaśle =

- Village
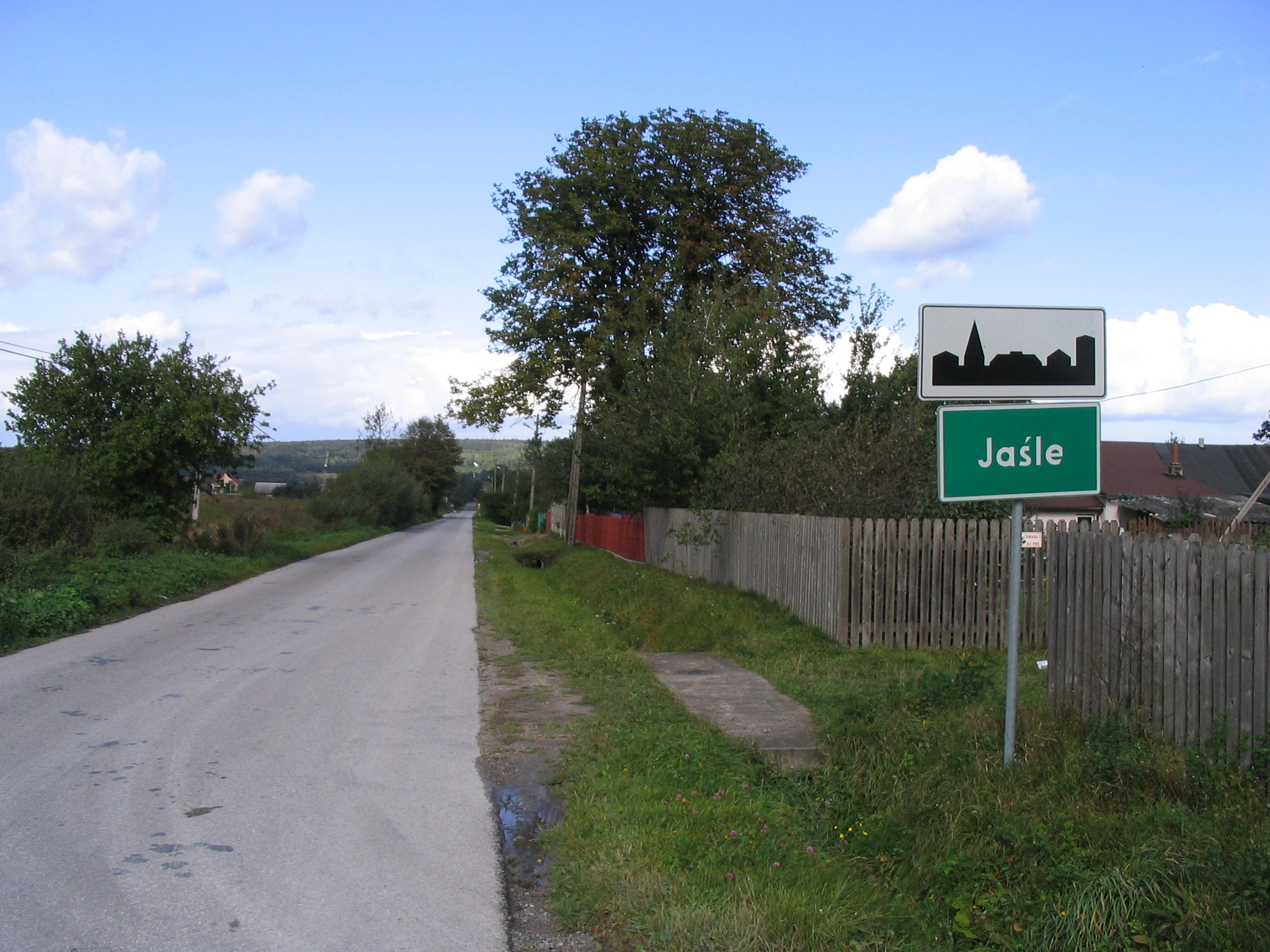
- Street and road sign of Jaśle village

- Location within Poland
- Coordinates: 51°00′04″N 20°46′30″E
- Country: Poland
- Voivodeship: Świętokrzyskie
- County: Skarżysko
- Gmina: Łączna

Jaśle [ˈjaɕlɛ] is a village in the administrative district of Gmina Łączna, within Skarżysko County, Świętokrzyskie Voivodeship, in south-central Poland.
