= Biała, Masovian Voivodeship =

Biała
- Village
- Location within Poland
- Coordinates: 52°36′21″N 19°39′9″E
- Country: Poland
- Voivodeship: Masovian
- County: Płock
- Gmina: Stara Biała
- Time zone: UTC+1 (CET)
  - Summer (DST): UTC+2 (CEST)
- Vehicle registration: WPL

Biała [ˈbjawa] is a village in Płock County, Masovian Voivodeship, in central Poland. It is the seat of the gmina (administrative district) called Gmina Stara Biała.
