= Stare Proboszczewice =

- Village
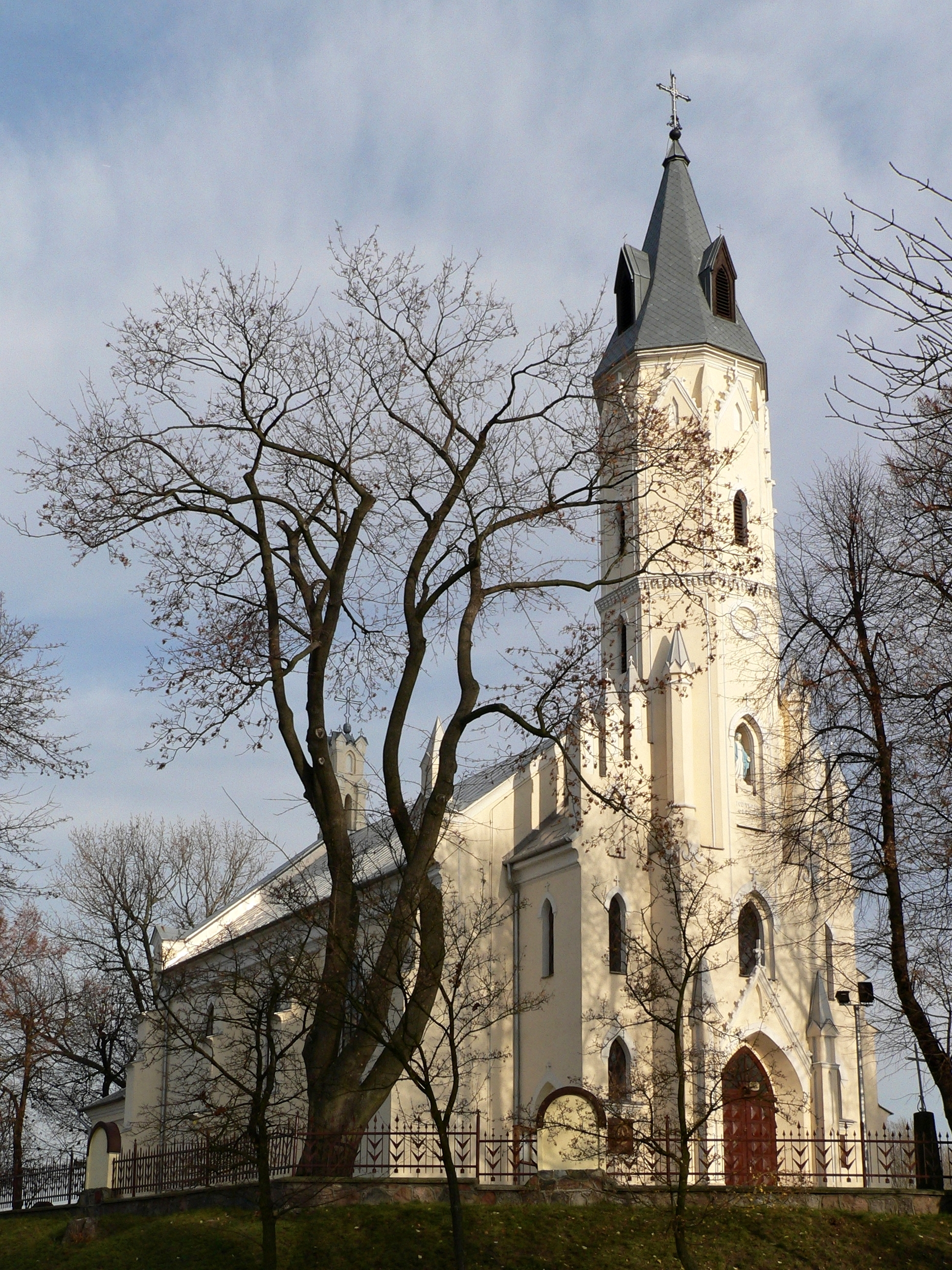
- Parish Church of St Florian

- Location within Poland
- Coordinates: 52°39′N 19°41′E
- Country: Poland
- Voivodeship: Masovian
- County: Płock
- Gmina: Stara Biała
- Elevation: 100 m (330 ft)
- Population: 404
- Time zone: UTC+1 (CET)
  - Summer (DST): UTC+2 (CEST)
- Vehicle registration: WPL

Stare Proboszczewice [ˈstarɛ prɔbɔʂt͡ʂɛˈvit͡sɛ] is a village in the administrative district of Gmina Stara Biała, within Płock County, Masovian Voivodeship, in central Poland.

== Location ==
It is located on the northern edge of the Wierzbica stream valley, which is a tributary of Skrwa. The intensive settlement of the area is confirmed by historical material that appears on the surface of the fields surrounding the settlement from the east.

== History ==
In the 10th century the village was the site of a Slavic fort. It was one of the largest early medieval settlements in Mazovia. It was situated on the bank of the River, surrounded by a moat it was 110 m by 130 m.

From the 12th century when the town was owned by the provosts of the Plock Cathedral. Proboszczewice probably took its name from the provost.

In 1375 Dobiesław Sówka, bishop of Plock, granted the village of "Petro servitori nostri" in three fields, settling after floret from the annual rent and 6 grain measures. Records show the tithing, was 4 finches and 2 chickens (Cod. 85).

In 1578 both villages of greater Proboszczewice and lesser Proboszczewice have a parish church, they pay from 22 lans, they have 6 farmers, a craftsman, a widow of a blacksmith, a liquor of beer and vodka. There is also a mill. The village was owned by the Bishop of Plock, Piotr Dunin Wolski who was also Crown Deputy Chancellor.

After the Second Partition of Poland in 1793, the village was annexed by Prussia. In 1807, it became part of the short-lived Polish Duchy of Warsaw, and after the duchy's dissolution in 1815, it fell to the Russian Partition of Poland. In 1822, it was a national village. In 1828 there was a mill here. In 1888, the village was recorded with a church, a tavern and a farm. Following World War I, in 1918, Poland regained independence and control of the village.

During the German occupation in World War II, in October 1939 the occupiers transferred the village to be part of the Zichenau (region) of East Prussia. German occupation ended in 1945.

== Landmarks ==
- The parish church, of St Florian, a neo-Gothic, brick building erected in 1868–1869 with the efforts of Fr. Mikolaj Bilinski, and in 1906, consecrated by Bishop Apolinary Wnukowski. It has murals made in 1907, which were renovated and supplemented in 1980 by Ludwik Jedrzejewski from Plock. In the neo-Gothic main altar from the end of the 19th century, there is a sculpture of Christ Crucified, a replica of a crucifix from the altar of the main reformatory church in Plock (1777). During World War II, the church was closed. In its interior, the Baroque fonts: a baptismal font, a monstrance and a reliquary deserve attention. The bell tower is 20th century.
- Graveyard chapel built in 1892.
- The old Evangelical cemetery, now completely destroyed.
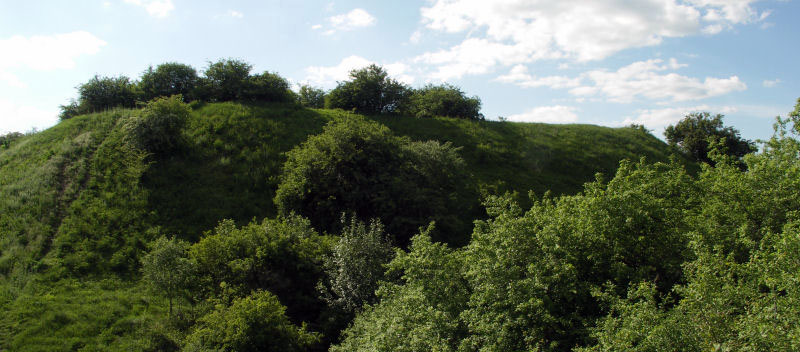
  Hairy Mountain near the village.
- A Slavic stronghold from the 10th century, called the Hairy Mountain. The settlement in Proboszczewice is today well-preserved object with impressive dimensions of 110 mx 130 m. The width of the embankments at the base reaches up to 40 m and their height reaches 8 m, counting from the inside from the mezzanine and 16 m from the outside. From the elevation side, the shaft is cut off by a ditch with a width of up to 15 m and a depth of up to 8 m. The settlement with the surrounding ditch covers an area of ??about 2.5 ha. From the eastern side of the hill, the cultivated fields stretch out, from the west the stronghold is limited by a deep valley of the Wierzbica stream covered with intense alders. During the survey, which established the basic settlement period for the 11th century, a 2 x 42 m excavation was guided through the middle of the Maidan. In the central part of the excavation no traces of settlement were found, while intense layers were exposed in the flood bays - both in the south, as well as the northern end of the survey excavation. In the northern part of the trench, beneath the hopper layers with a thickness of up to 1.8 m, a 10-cm cultural layer containing ceramics dated back to the 11th century and a multi-layered cluster of stones on the outer slope of the flood basin were found. Also documented is a heap of embankments with a thickness up to 1.3 m containing large amounts of burnt wood and stones. Analogous layering was observed in the southern part of the survey excavation, where it was also discovered near the embankment a three-layer cluster of stones located in a hollow about 6 m wide and 2 m deep. During the exploration of this object, fragments of the 11th century pottery and a fragment of an iron bit were obtained with a mustache.
- Manor house from 1906, currently the headquarters of the Health Center.

== See also ==
- Nowe Proboszczewice
