= Gmina Łączna =

Gmina Łączna Łączna Commune
- Gmina
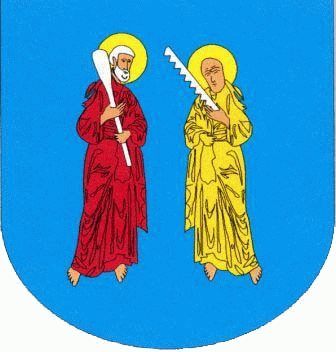
- Coat of arms
- Interactive map of Gmina Łączna
- Coordinates (Łączna): 50°59′34″N 20°47′20″E
- Country: Poland
- Voivodeship: Świętokrzyskie
- County: Skarżysko
- Seat: Łączna

Area
  - Total: 61.65 km^{2} (23.80 sq mi)

Population (2006)
  - Total: 5,245
  - Density: 85.08/km^{2} (220.3/sq mi)
- Website: https://www.laczna.pl

Gmina Łączna is a rural gmina (administrative district) in Skarżysko County, Świętokrzyskie Voivodeship, in south-central Poland. Its seat is the village of Łączna, which lies approximately 17 kilometres (11 mi) south-west of Skarżysko-Kamienna and 18 km (11 mi) north-east of the regional capital Kielce.

The gmina covers an area of 61.65 square kilometres (23.8 sq mi), and as of 2006 its total population was 5,245.

The gmina contains part of the protected area called Suchedniów-Oblęgorek Landscape Park.

== Villages ==
Gmina Łączna contains the villages and settlements of Czerwona Górka, Gózd, Jaśle, Jęgrzna, Kamionki, Klonów, Łączna, Osełków, Podłazie, Podzagnańszcze, Stawik, Występa, Zagórze, Zalezianka and Zaskale.

== Buildings and structures ==
North of Gózd, there is at 50°58′57.6″N 20°44′47.1″E a 104 metres tall free-standing lattice tower used as radio relay.

== Neighbouring gminas ==
Gmina Łączna is bordered by the gminas of Bliżyn, Bodzentyn, Masłów, Suchedniów and Zagnańsk.
