= Bronowo-Zalesie =

- Village
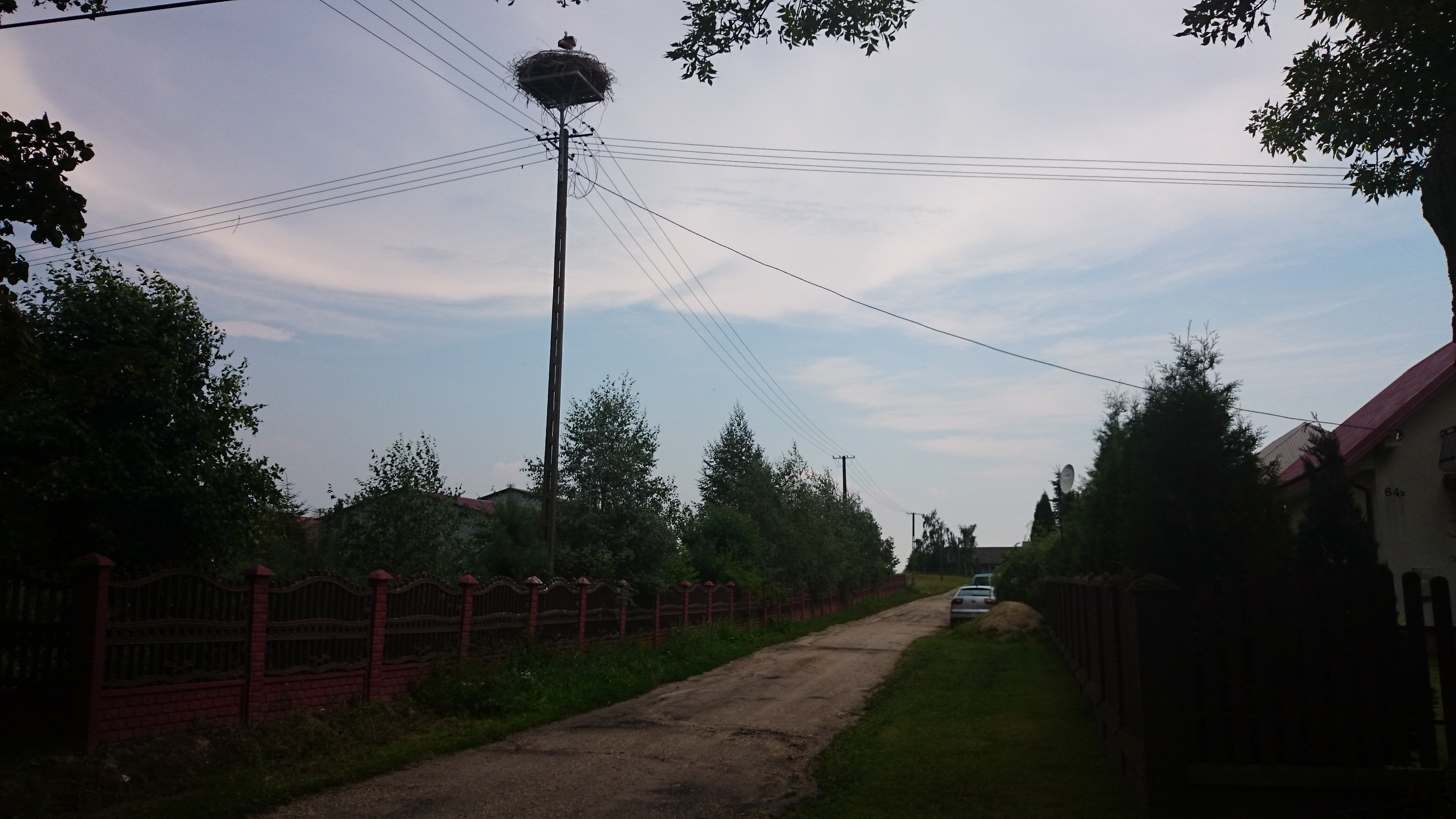
- Bronowo-Zalesie

- Location within Poland
- Coordinates: 52°36′58″N 19°44′28″E
- Country: Poland
- Voivodeship: Masovian
- County: Płock
- Gmina: Stara Biała

Population (2011)
  - Total: 397
- Time zone: UTC+1 (CET)
  - Summer (DST): UTC+2 (CEST)
- Vehicle registration: WPL

Bronowo-Zalesie [brɔˈnɔvɔ zaˈlɛɕɛ] is a village in the administrative district of Gmina Stara Biała, within Płock County, Masovian Voivodeship, in central Poland.
