= Nowe Proboszczewice =

- Village
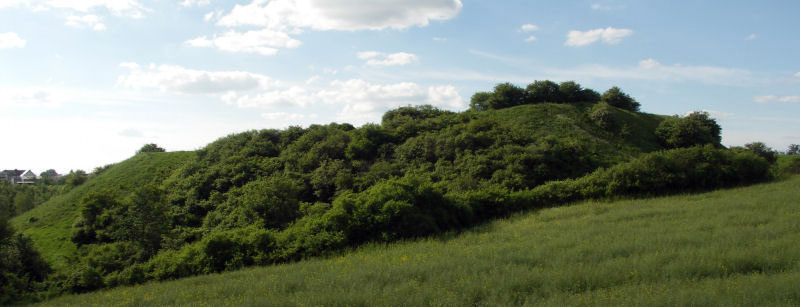

- Location within Poland
- Coordinates: 52°39′N 19°41′E
- Country: Poland
- Voivodeship: Masovian
- County: Płock
- Gmina: Stara Biała
- Elevation: 100 m (330 ft)

Population
  - Total: 1,470 (2,011)
- Time zone: UTC+1 (CET)
  - Summer (DST): UTC+2 (CEST)
- Vehicle registration: WPL

Nowe Proboszczewice [ˈnɔvɛ prɔbɔʂt͡ʂɛˈvit͡sɛ] is a village in the administrative district of Gmina Stara Biała, within Płock County, Masovian Voivodeship, in central Poland.

The village is located on the Wierzbica River, a tributary of the Skrwa River. In 1975–1998, it was part of the Plock province.

== See also ==
- Old Proboszczewice
- Proboszczewice Plockie
