= Nowe Bronowo =

- Village
- Location within Poland
- Coordinates: 52°36′50″N 19°43′06″E
- Country: Poland
- Voivodeship: Masovian
- County: Płock
- Gmina: Stara Biała

Population
  - Total: 127
- Postal code: 09-411
- Vehicle registration: WPL

Nowe Bronowo [ˈnɔvɛ brɔˈnɔvɔ] is a village in the administrative district of Gmina Stara Biała, within Płock County, Masovian Voivodeship, in central Poland.

In 2011 Novo Bronowo had a population of 127.
