= Gmina Stara Biała =

Gmina Stara Biała Stara Biała Commune
- Gmina
- Coat of arms
- Interactive map of Gmina Stara Biała
- Coordinates (Biała): 52°36′21″N 19°39′9″E
- Country: Poland
- Voivodeship: Masovian
- County: Płock County
- Seat: Biała

Area
  - Total: 111.12 km^{2} (42.90 sq mi)

Population (2006)
  - Total: 10,040
  - Density: 90.35/km^{2} (234.0/sq mi)
- Time zone: UTC+1 (CET)
  - Summer (DST): UTC+2 (CEST)
- Vehicle registration: WPL
- Website: http://www.starabiala.pl

Gmina Stara Biała is a rural gmina (administrative district) in Płock County, Masovian Voivodeship, in central Poland. Its seat is the village of Biała, which lies approximately 8 kilometres (5 mi) north-west of Płock and 101 km (63 mi) north-west of Warsaw. The gmina takes its name from the village of Stara Biała.

The gmina covers an area of 111.12 square kilometres (42.9 sq mi), and as of 2006 its total population was 10,040.

The gmina contains part of the protected area called Brudzeń Landscape Park.

== Villages ==
Gmina Stara Biała contains the villages and settlements of Biała, Bronowo Kmiece, Bronowo-Zalesie, Brwilno, Dziarnowo, Kamionki, Kobierniki, Kowalewko, Kruszczewo, Ludwikowo, Mańkowo, Maszewo, Maszewo Duże, Miłodróż, Nowa Biała, Nowe Bronowo, Nowe Draganie, Nowe Proboszczewice, Nowe Trzepowo, Ogorzelice, Srebrna, Stara Biała, Stare Draganie, Stare Proboszczewice, Trzebuń, Ulaszewo, Włoczewo and Wyszyna.

== Neighbouring gminas ==
Gmina Stara Biała is bordered by the city of Płock and by the gminas of Bielsk, Brudzeń Duży, Gozdowo, Nowy Duninów and Radzanowo.
