= Włoczewo =

- Village
- Location within Poland
- Coordinates: 52°40′N 19°39′E
- Country: Poland
- Voivodeship: Masovian
- County: Płock
- Gmina: Stara Biała
- Postal code: 09-412

Włoczewo [vwɔˈt͡ʂɛvɔ] is a village in the administrative district of Gmina Stara Biała, within Płock County, Masovian Voivodeship, in central Poland.

== Geography ==
The village is in the valley of the Vistula river outside of Płock. In 2011 the population of the village was 141

== History ==
After the Second Partition of Poland in 1793, the village was annexed by Prussia. In 1807, it became part of the short-lived Polish Duchy of Warsaw, and after the duchy's dissolution in 1815, it fell to the Russian Partition of Poland. Following World War I, in 1918, Poland regained independence and control of the village.

During the German occupation in World War II, in October 1939 the occupiers transferred the village to be part of the Zichenau (region) of East Prussia. German occupation ended in 1945.
