= Stara Biała =

- Village
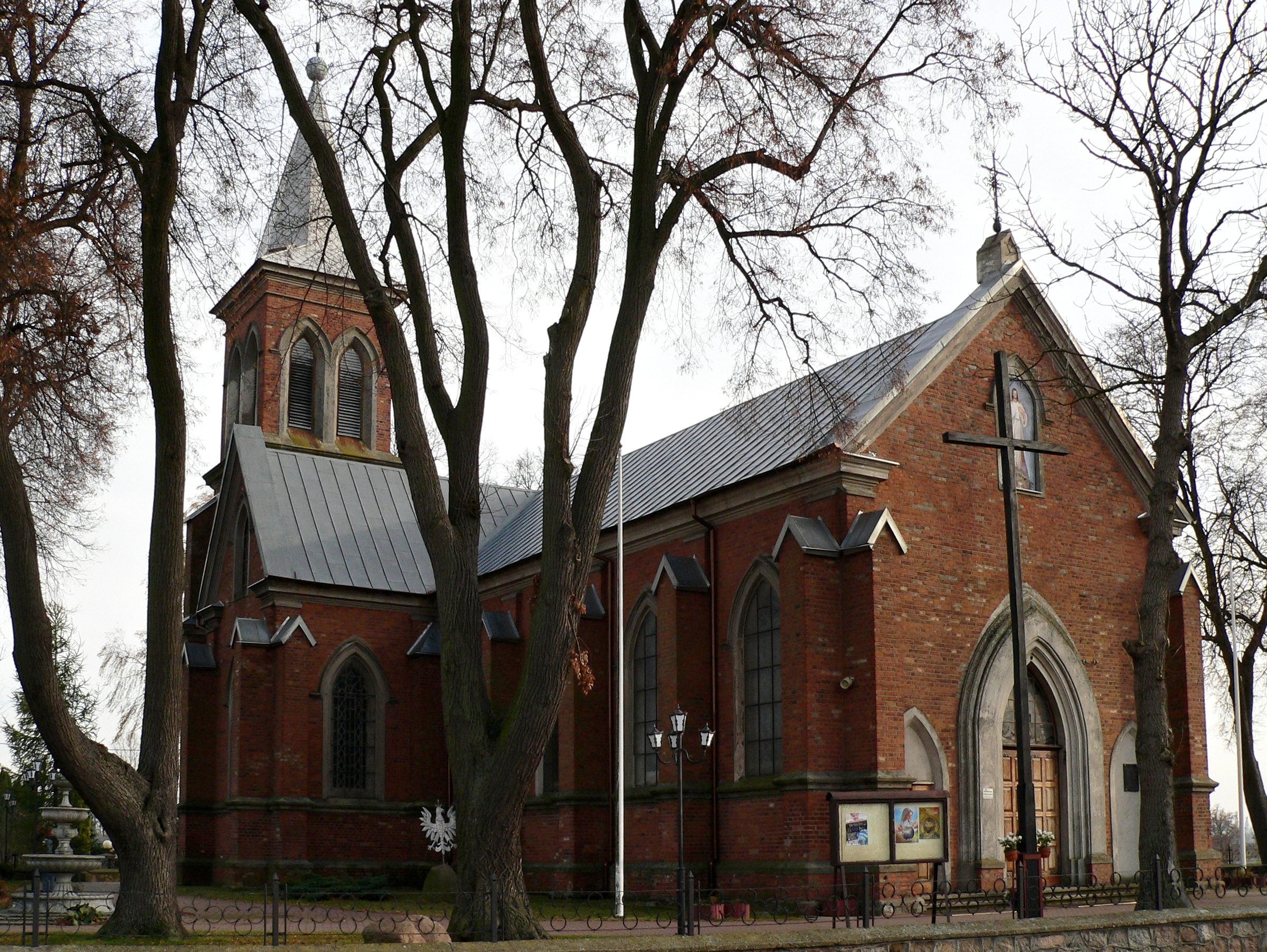
- Church of Saint Hedwig of Silesia

- Location within Poland
- Coordinates: 52°37′N 19°39′E
- Country: Poland
- Voivodeship: Masovian
- County: Płock
- Gmina: Stara Biała
- Time zone: UTC+1 (CET)
  - Summer (DST): UTC+2 (CEST)
- Vehicle registration: WPL

Stara Biała [ˈstara ˈbjawa] is a village in the administrative district of Gmina Stara Biała, within Płock County, Masovian Voivodeship, in central Poland.

The population of the village is 442 and the post code is 09-411.

== Landmarks ==
- Church of Saint Hedwig of Silesia
- John Paul II primary school.
- Communal Public Library
- A road connecting the village with Kamionki runs through the center of Stara Biała.
