= Stawik, Świętokrzyskie Voivodeship =

Stawik
- Village
- Location within Poland
- Coordinates: 51°00′10″N 20°47′14″E
- Country: Poland
- Voivodeship: Świętokrzyskie
- County: Skarżysko
- Gmina: Łączna

Stawik [ˈstavik] is a village in the administrative district of Gmina Łączna, within Skarżysko County, Świętokrzyskie Voivodeship, in south-central Poland.
