= Stare Draganie =

- Village
- Location within Poland
- Coordinates: 52°36′20″N 19°41′45″E
- Country: Poland
- Voivodeship: Masovian
- County: Płock
- Gmina: Stara Biała
- Postal code: 09-411

Stare Draganie [ˈstarɛ draˈɡaɲɛ] is a village in the administrative district of Gmina Stara Biała, within Płock County, Masovian Voivodeship, in central Poland.
