= Łączna, Świętokrzyskie Voivodeship =

Łączna
- Village
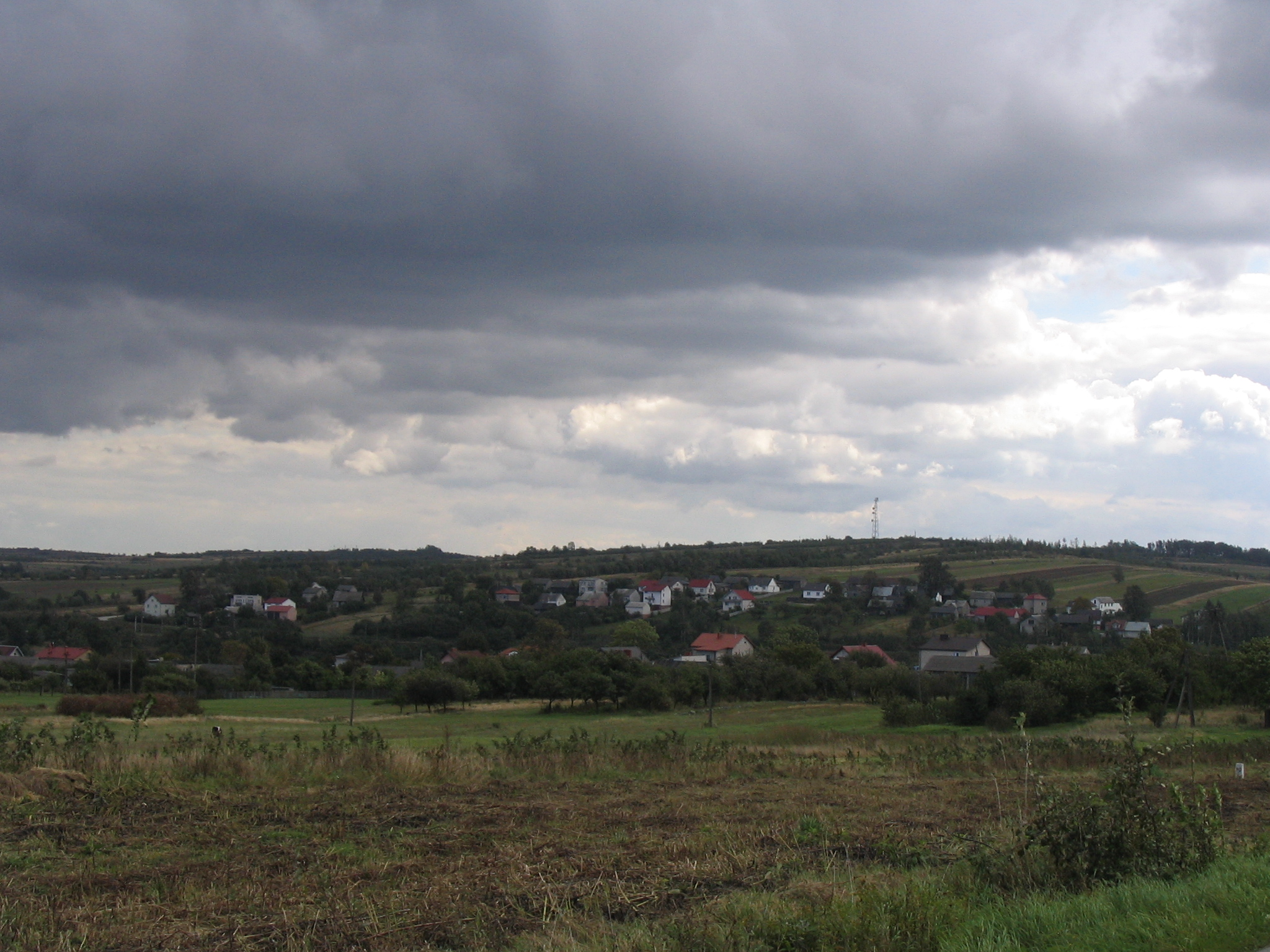

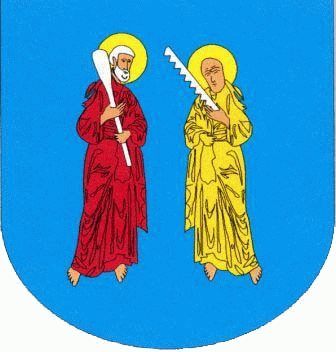
- Coat of arms

- Location within Poland
- Coordinates: 50°59′34″N 20°47′20″E
- Country: Poland
- Voivodeship: Świętokrzyskie
- County: Skarżysko
- Gmina: Łączna
- Population: 780

Łączna [ˈwɔnt͡ʂna] is a village in Skarżysko County, Świętokrzyskie Voivodeship, in south-central Poland. It is the seat of the gmina (administrative district) called Gmina Łączna. It lies approximately 17 km (11 mi) south-west of Skarżysko-Kamienna and 18 km (11 mi) north-east of the regional capital Kielce.
