= Stanislav (given name) =

Given name of Slavic origin

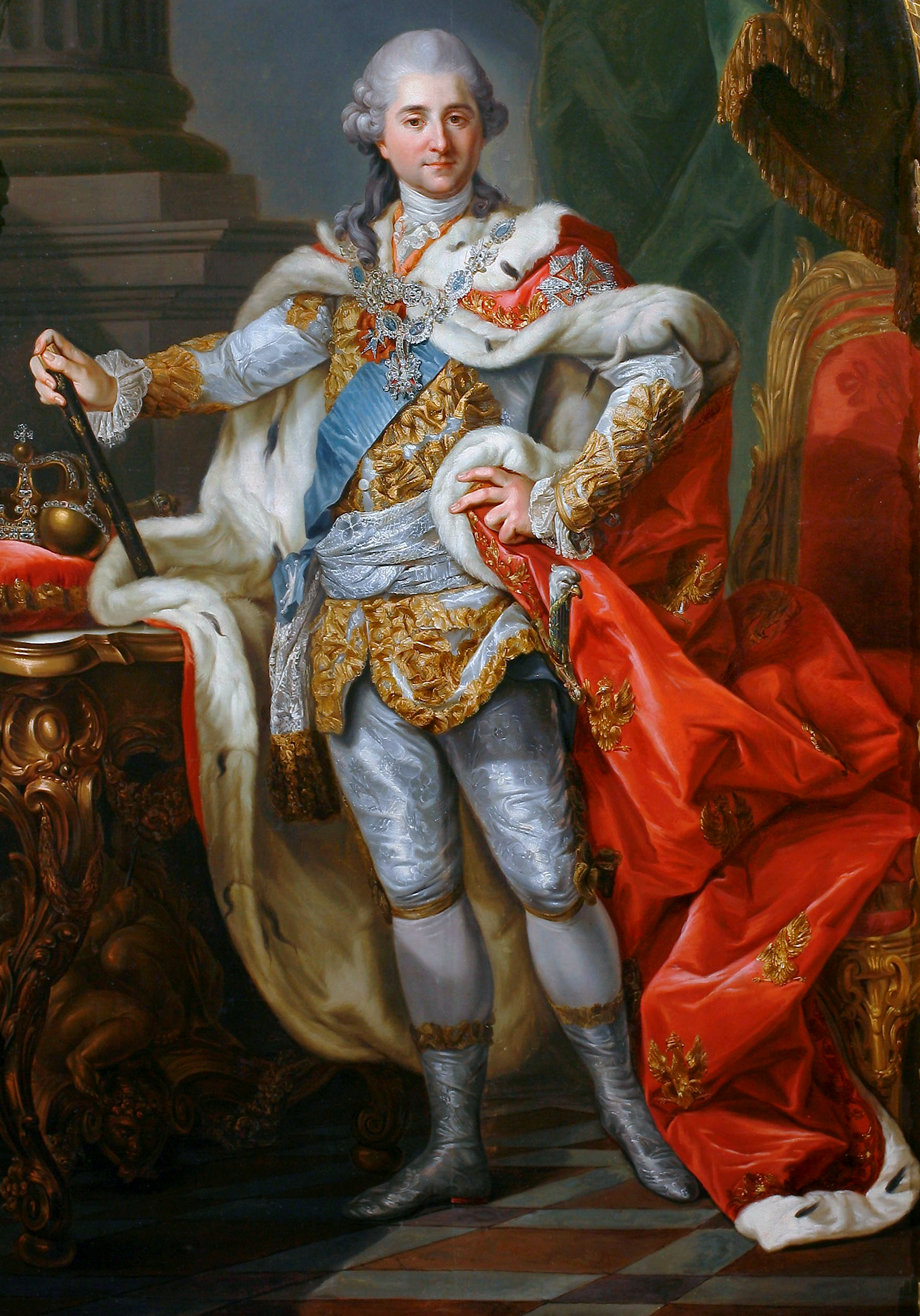
- Stanisław II August, King of Poland and Grand Duke of Lithuania
- Gender: male

Origin
- Origin: Slavic
- Meaning: stani ("to become") + slava ("glory, fame")

Other names
- Alternative spelling: Stanislaus (Latin, German), Stanislav (Slovak), Stanislau, Stanislaw (Belarusian), Stanislas (French), Staņislavs (Latvian), Stanislovas (Lithuanian), Stanisław (Polish), Estanislau (Portuguese), Estanislao (Spanish), Szaniszló (Hungarian), Stanislao (Italian)

Stanislav is a masculine given name of Slavic origin. It is derived from the Slavic elements stan(i)- ("to stand, become") and slav(a) ("glory, fame"), and is generally interpreted as "one who achieves glory" or "one who becomes glorious". Stanislaus is a Latin form of the name. It is used in several Slavic countries, particularly in Central and Eastern Europe. The name has also been adopted in some non-Slavic languages, including French (Stanislas) and German (Stanislaus).

A feminine form of the name is Stanislava.

== Polish language ==
In Polish, the name Stanisław has the following common diminutives: Stach, Stan, Stańko, Staś, Stasio, Stasiek, Staszek. By 15th century the following diminutives were recorded: Stachnię, Stachnik, Stachno, Stachosz, Stachura, Stacher, Stachyr, Stachyra, Stasz, Staszak, Staszeczko, Staszek, Staszel, Stasiu. Many of them turned into family names.

Variants: Stasław, Tasław, Stanislaw.

Its feminine form is Stanisława.

Stasiek, Stach may also be surnames.

Other derived surnames:

- Stachow, Stachowiak, (fem.: Stachowiakowa, Stachowiakówna) Stachowicz Stachowska Stachowski Stachurka Stachwiak
- Stanisławski (fem. Stanisławska), Stanczak
- Stasiak, Stasicki, Stasiewski, Stasiński, Stasiuk, Staśkiewicz, Stasik
- Staszak (Staszakowa), Staszewski, Staszkiel, Staszkiewicz, Staszyński (Ukrainian: Stashynsky)

== East Slavic languages ==
In Belarusian, Russian, and Ukrainian, the diminutive forms of the name are Stas, Stas' and Stasik.

== Croatian and Slovene ==
In Croatian and Slovene, the name Stanislav is usually abbreviated either to Stanko, Stane or Slavko.

== Other ==
Станіслаў / Stanisłaŭ (Belarusian), Stanislav (Croatian, Czech, Romanian, Serbian, Slovak and Slovene), Станіслав (Ukrainian), Станислав (Bulgarian, Russian, Serbian, Macedonian), Stanislas (French), Stanislaus (German, Latin), Stanislovas (Lithuanian), Staņislavs (Latvian), Stanislao (Italian), Estanislau (Portuguese), Ainéislis (Irish/Gaelic), Estanislao (Spanish) and Szaniszló (Hungarian).

This given name is often Anglicized to "Stanley", although "Stanley" has non-Slavic origin as well in English-speaking countries.

== People with the name ==
=== Saints ===
- Stanislaus of Szczepanów (1030–1079), Roman Catholic bishop and martyr
- Stanisław Kazimierczyk (1433–1489), Roman Catholic priest
- Stanislaus Kostka (1550–1568), Jesuit
- Stanisław Kubista (1898–1940), Polish Roman Catholic priest and martyr
- Stanisław Musiał (1938–2004), Polish Jesuit writer
- Stanislav Nasadil (1907–1941), Orthodox hieromartyr
- Stanisław Nowak (1935–2021), Polish archbishop
- Stanislaus Papczyński (1631–1701), Roman Catholic priest
- Stanisław Bohusz Siestrzeńcewicz (1731–1826), Belarusian archbishop
- Stanisław of Skarbimierz (1360–1431), Polish academic and Christian religious leader
- Stanisław Sówka, Polish bishop
- Stanisław Szymecki (1924–2023), Polish Roman Catholic archbishop
- Stanisław Trzeciak (1873–1944), Polish Catholic priest and Nazi collaborator
- Stanisław Wielgus (born 1939), Polish prelate of the Catholic Church
- Stanisław Załęski (1843–1908), Polish priest and historian of Jesuit history
- Stanisław Kazimierz Zdzitowiecki (1854–1927), Polish Roman Catholic bishop

=== Roman Catholic Prelates ===
- Stanisław Adamski (1875–1967), Polish bishop and politician
- Stanisław Bedliński (died 1689), Roman Catholic bishop
- Stanisław Dąmbski (c. 1638–1700), 17th-century Polish prelate
- Stanisław Gądecki (born 1949), Polish archbishop
- Stanisław Gall (1865–1942), Polish Roman Catholic bishop
- Stanislav Hočevar (born 1945), Slovenian archbishop
- Stanislaus Hosius (1504 – 1579), Polish Roman Catholic Cardinal
- Stanisław Karnkowski (1520–1603), Polish bishop
- Stanisław Krakiewicz (1892–1985), Polish Ministry of Public Works
- Stanislav Lipovšek (born 1943), Slovenian Roman Catholic prelate
- Stanisław Łoza (1573–1639), Roman Catholic prelate
- Stanisław Łubieński (1573–1640), Polish bishop
- Stanisław Kostka Łukomski (1874–1948), Polish Catholic bishop
- Stanisław Ryłko (born 1945), Polish Roman Catholic cardinal
- Stanislav Shyrokoradiuk (born 1956), Ukrainian bishop
- Stanisław Słomowski (died 1575), 16th-century Polish archbishop
- Stanisław Stefanek (1936–2020), Polish prelate of the Catholic Church
- Stanislav Stolárik (born 1955), Slovak Roman Catholic Bishop
- Stanisław Szembek (1650–1721), Polish Catholic prelate
- Stanisław Zaremba (died 1648), Polish cleric and scholar
- Stanislav Zore (born 1958), Slovenian Catholic archbishop
- Stanislav Zvolenský (born 1958), Slovak Roman Catholic Archbishop

=== Monarchs ===
- Stanisław Leszczyński (1677–1766), King of Poland
- Stanisław of Masovia (1501–1524), Duke of Masovia
- Stanisław August Poniatowski (1732–1798), King of Poland
- Louis Stanislas Xavier (1755–1824), King of France as Louis XVIII
- Francesco Giuseppe Carlo Ambrogio Stanislao (1779–1846), Duke of Modena as Francis IV

=== Nobilities ===
- Stanislav (čelnik) (fl. 1377), Serbian noble
- Stanisław Ernest Denhoff (c. 1673–1728), Polish noble
- Stanisław Dunin-Wąsowicz (1785–1864), Polish noble
- Stanisław Golski (died 1612), Polish nobleman
- Stanisław Jan Jabłonowski (1634–1702), Polish nobleman
- Stanisław Kiszka (1584–1626), Roman Catholic bishop
- Stanisław Koniecpolski (c.1592–1646), Polish nobleman, voivode of Sandomierz
- Stanisław Krasiński, multiple people
- Stanisław Kurnatowski (1823–1912), Polish nobleman and politician
- Stanisław Lubomirski, several people
- Stanisław Mokronowski (1761–1821), Polish nobleman and general
- Stanisław Niemira (1597–1648), Polish-Lithuanian noble
- Stanisław Antoni Potocki (1837–1884), Polish noble
- Stanisław Kostka Potocki (1755–1821), Polish noble, politician, writer, 3rd Prime Minister
- Stanisław Albrecht Radziwiłł (1914–1976), Polish-British nobleman and philanthropist
- Stanisław Ferdynand Rzewuski (c. 1737–1786), Polish noble
- Stanisław Mateusz Rzewuski (c. 1662–1728), Polish nobleman
- Stanisław Sołtyk (1752–1833), Polish noble
- Stanisław Stadnicki (c. 1551–1617), Polish nobleman
- Stanisław Antoni Szczuka (1654–1710), Polish noble, politician and political writer
- Stanisław Tarło (died 1599/1601), Polish noble
- Stanisław Tarnowski (1837–1917), Polish nobleman
- Stanisław Kostka Zamoyski (1775–1856), Polish nobleman
- Stanisław Żółkiewski (1547–1620), Polish szlachta (nobleman), magnate and military commander

=== Art, film and television ===
- Stanisław Albinowski (1923–2005), Polish economist, columnist and journalist
- Stanislav Aseyev (born 1989), Ukrainian writer and journalist
- Stanisław Baczyński (1890–1939), Polish writer
- Stanisław Baj (born 1953), Polish painter
- Stanisław Baliński (1898–1984), Polish poet, writer and diplomat
- Stanisław Barańczak (1946–2014), Polish poet, literary critic, scholar, editor, translator and lecturer
- Stanisław Bareja (1929–1987), Polish filmmaker
- Stanislav Bartůšek (born 1961), Czech journalist
- Stanisław Bereś (born 1950), Polish poet, literary critic, translator and literary historian
- Stanisław Bergman (1862–1930), Polish painter
- Stanislav Binar (1908–1969), Czech sculptor
- Stanisław Bohusz-Siestrzeńcewicz (1869–1927), Polish painter
- Stanislav Boklan (born 1960), Ukrainian actor
- Stanisław Brzozowski (born 1938), Polish mime artist
- Estanislao del Campo (1834–1880), Argentine poet
- Stanislav Chekan (1922–1994), Soviet actor
- Stanisław Chlebowski (1835–1884), Polish painter
- Stanisław Dębicki (1866–1924), Polish painter and illustrator
- Stanisław Dobosiewicz (1910–2007), Polish writer and school teacher
- Stanisław Dróżdż (1939–2009), Polish poet
- Stanislav Duzhnikov (born 1973), Russian actor
- Stanisław Dygat (1914–1978), Polish writer
- Stanisław Eleszkiewicz (1900–1963), Polish painter and draftsman
- Stanislav Feikl (1883–1933), Czech painter and portrait painter
- Stanislav Fišer (1931–2022), Czech actor
- Stanisław Frenkiel (1918–2001), Polish painter
- Stanisław Gawlik (1925–1990), Polish actor
- Stanislav Govorukhin (1936–2018), Russian film director
- Stanisław Grabowski (1901–1957), Polish painter
- Stanisław Grocholski (1858–1932), Polish painter
- Stanisław Grochowiak (1934–1976), Polish poet and dramatist
- Stanisław Grolicki (1892–1947), Polish actor
- Stanisław Gronkowski (1922–2004), Polish actor
- Stanislas de Guaita (1861–1897), French poet, expert on esotericism and European mysticism
- Stanislav Hanzík (1931–2021), Czech sculptor
- Stanislav Holý (1943–1998), Czech graphic artist, caricaturist, and designer of animated films
- Stanisław Horno-Popławski (1902–1997), Russian-polish sculptor
- Stanislav Ianevski (born 1985), Bulgarian actor who played Viktor Krum in Harry Potter
- Stanislav Issaev (born 1956), Russian ballet dancer
- Stanisław Jachowicz (1796–1857), Polish poet
- Stanisław Jackowski (1887–1951), Polish sculptor
- Stanisław Jaśkiewicz (1907–1980), Polish actor
- Stanisław Jędryka (1933–2019), Polish film director and writer
- Stanisław Kaczor-Batowski (1866–1946), Polish realist and romanticist painter
- Stanisław Kamocki (1875–1944), Polish painter
- Stanislav Kolíbal (born 1925), Czech artist
- Stanisław Konarski (1700–1773), Polish pedagogue, educational reformer, political writer, poet, dramatist and priest
- Stanisław Korab-Brzozowski (1876–1901), Polish poet and translator
- Stanisław Kazimierz Kossakowski (1837–1905), Polish heraldist, photographer and landowner
- Stanisław Egbert Koźmian (1811–1885), Polish translator, writer and poet
- Staņislavs Kreics (1909–1992), Latvian landscape painter
- Stanislav Kunyaev (born 1932), Russian poet and writer
- Stanisław Łapiński (1895–1972), Polish actor
- Stanisław Jerzy Lec (1909–1966), Polish poet and aphorist
- Stanisław Lem (1921–2006), Polish science fiction author and philosopher
- Stanislav Latal (1919–1994), Czech animator
- Stanislav Ledinek (1920–1969), German actor
- Stanisław Lentz (1861–1920), Polish artist
- Stanisław Roman Lewandowski (1857–1940), Polish sculptor
- Stanislav Libenský (1921–2002), Russian contemporary artist
- Stanislav Lolek (1873–1936), Czech painter, illustrator and comics artist
- Stanislav Lyubshin (born 1933), Russian actor, film director and People's Artist of the RSFSR (1981)
- Stanisław Mackiewicz (1896–1966), Polish writer
- Stanisław Masłowski (1853–1926), Polish painter
- Stanislav Meleiko (1937–2021), Russian journalist
- Stanislas Merhar (born 1971), French actor of Slovene descent
- Stanisław Michalski (1932–2011), Polish actor
- Stanisław Miedza-Tomaszewski (1913–2000), Polish artist
- Stanisław Mikulski (1929–2014), Polish actor
- Stanisław Milski (1897–1972), Polish actor
- Stanislav Netšvolodov (born 1935), Estonian sculptor
- Stanislav Kostka Neumann (1875–1947), Czech poet
- Stanislav Neumann (1902–1975), Czech actor
- Stanislao Nievo (1928–2006), Italian writer, journalist and director
- Stanisław Niwiński (1932–2002), Polish actor
- Stanisław Nogaj, Polish journalist and writer
- Stanisław Ostoja-Chrostowski (1897–1947), Polish artist
- Stanisław Pagaczewski (1916–1984), Polish journalist and writer
- Stanislav Párnický (1945–2023), Slovak director
- Stanisław Piasecki (1900–1941), Polish journalist
- Stanisław Prauss (1902–1967), Polish painter
- Stanislaw Przespolewski (1910–1989), Polish painter
- Stanisław Przybyszewski (1868–1927), Polish novelist, dramatist and poet
- Stanislav Rapotec (1911–1997), painter and patriot
- Stanislav Rostotsky (1922–2001), Soviet film director and screenwriter
- Stanisław Jakub Rostworowski (1858–1888), Polish painter
- Stanisław Różewicz (1924–2008), Polish film director and screenwriter
- Stanislav Rudolf (1932–2022), Czech writer, screenwriter, and journalist
- Stanislav Sadalsky (born 1951), Soviet and Russian actor
- Stanisław Samostrzelnik (c. 1485–1541), Polish renaissance painter
- Stanislav Šárský (1939–2025), Czech actor
- Stanisław Sheybal (1891–1976), Polish photographer
- Stanisław Sielański (1899–1955), Polish actor
- Stanislav Sokolov (born 1947), Russian stop-motion animation director
- Stanislav Solovkin (born 1977), Russian film director
- Stanislav Stanojevic (born 1938), Serbian film director
- Stanislav Stratiev (1941–2000), Bulgarian writer
- Stanislav Strnad (1930–2012), Czech film director
- Stanisław Stwosz (1478–1528), Polish sculptor
- Stanislav Sucharda (1866–1916), Czech sculptor
- Stanislav Sychov (1937–2003), Ukrainian underground artist
- Stanisław Szebego, Polish film director and composer
- Stanisław Szukalski (1893–1987), Polish-born painter and sculptor
- Stanisław Szymański (1930–1999), Polish ballet dancer
- Stanisław Tarnowski (1838–1909), Polish painter
- Stanislav Tereba (1938–2023), Czech photojournalist
- Stanisław Tondos (1854–1917), Polish painter
- Stanislas Torrents (1839–1916), French painter
- Stanisław Trembecki (c. 1730–1812), Polish writer
- Stanisław Tym (1937–2024), Polish actor, writer and director
- Stanislaus "Stan" Valchek, character in The Wire
- Stanislav Vinaver (1891–1955), Serbian writer
- Stanislav Voronov (born 1957), Russian artist
- Stanko Vraz (1810–1851), Slovenian-Croatian poet
- Stanisław Ignacy Witkiewicz (1885–1939), Polish writer, playwright, painter and philosopher
- Stanisław Witkiewicz (1851–1915), Polish artist, writer and architect
- Stanisław Wygodzki (1907–1992), Polish writer
- Stanisław Wyspiański (1869–1907), Polish playwright, painter and poet
- Stanisław Zaczyk (1923–1985), Polish actor
- Stanisław Zamecznik (1909–1971), Polish graphic artist, poster artist, scenographer and architect
- Stanislav Zelvensky (born 1978), Russian film critic and journalist
- Stanislav Zhukovsky (1873–1944), Polish-Russian painter
- Stan Borys (born 1941), Polish singer-songwriter, actor, director and poet
- Bern Nadette Stanis (born Bernadette Stanislas 1953), American actress
- Franchot Tone (1905–1968), birth name Stanislaus Pascal Franchot Tone, American actor

=== Military and politics ===
- Stanisław Abłamowicz, Polish political activist and lawyer
- Stanislas Marie Adelaide, comte de Clermont-Tonnerre (1757–1792), French aristocrat, military officer and politician
- Stanislav Anastasov (born 1983), Bulgarian politician
- Stanisław Aronson (born 1925), anti-nazi resistance fighter and IDF officer
- Stanisław Marcin Badeni (1850–1912), Polish politician
- Stanisław Basaj, Polish soldier and later a partisan of the Peasant Battalions
- Stanislav Belkovsky (born 1971), Russian political analyst
- Stanislas de Boufflers (1738–1815), French statesman and writer
- Stanisław Brochwicz, Polish Nazi collaborator
- Stanisław Brykalski (1912–1939), lieutenant of the Polish Army
- Stanisław Brzeski (1918–1972), Polish World War II flying ace
- Stanisław Bukowiec (born 1972), Polish politician
- Stanisław Bułak-Bałachowicz (1883–1940), Belarusian-Polish general
- Stanisław Car (1882–1938), Polish politician
- Stanislav Čeček (1866–1930), Czechoslovak legioneer and general
- Stanisław Chmielewski (born 1958), Polish politician
- Stanisław Chodecki (died 1529), Polish military commander and marshal
- Stanisław Chomętowski (1673–1728), Polish politician, military commander and diplomat
- Stanisław Ciosek (1939–2022), Polish diplomat and politician
- Stanisław Czapliński, Polish colonel
- Stanisław Dąbek (1892–1939), Polish infantry colonel
- Stanislav Daskalov (born 1952), Bulgarian politician
- Stanisław Dobrzański (born 1949), Polish politician
- Stane Dolanc (1925–1999), Slovenian and Yugoslav Communist politician
- Stanisław Dulias (1939–2020), Polish politician
- Stanisław Fiszer (1769–1812), Polish military officer
- Stanisław Flato (1910–1972), Polish intelligence officer
- Stanislav Fořt (born 1977), Slovak politician
- Stanisław Kostka Gadomski, Polish-Lithuanian general
- Stanislav Galić (born 1943), Bosnian Serb commander
- Stanisław Gawłowski (born 1968), Polish politician
- Stanisław Germałowicz (1903–1984), Polish politician
- Stanisław Głąbiński (1862–1941), Polish politician
- Stanisław Gmitruk (born 1955), Polish politician
- Stanisław Gogacz (born 1959), Polish politician
- Stanisław Gorczyca (born 1958), Polish politician
- Stanisław Sylwester Alfonzy Grodyński (1898–1971), Polish Starosta and Military Officer
- Stanislav Gross (1969–2015), former Prime Minister of the Czech Republic
- Stanisław Grzmot-Skotnicki (1894–1939), Polish military commander and a general of the Polish Army, one of the principal commanders of Battle of Tuchola Forest
- Stanisław Gucwa (1919–1994), Polish politician and economist
- Stanisław Gudowski (1918–2011), Polish Army officer
- Stanisław Haller (1872–1940), Polish politician and divisional general
- Stanislav Hazheev (born 1941), Minister of Defence in Transnistria
- Stanislav Huml (1955–2021), Czech police officer and politician
- Stanislav Hurenko (1936–2013), leader of the Ukrainian Soviet Socialist Republic
- Stanisław Huskowski (born 1953), Polish politician
- Stanisław Iwan, Polish politician
- Stanisław Iwanicki (born 1951), Polish lawyer and politician
- Stanisław Janikowski (1891–1965), Polish diplomat
- Stanisław Jarmoliński (born 1944), Polish politician and physician
- Stanisław Kalemba (born 1947), Polish politician
- Stanisław Kania (1927–2020), Polish politician
- Stanislav Kankurov (born 1985), Kazakhstani politician
- Stanisław Karubin (1915–1941), Polish fighter ace
- Stanislav of Kiev, last Kiev ruler of the Rurik Dynasty
- Stanisław Kiszka (died 1513 or 1514), Lithuanian diplomat
- Stanisław Klimecki (1833–1942), Polish politician
- Stanisław Kogut (1953–2020), Polish politician
- Stanisław Kopański (1895–1976), Polish general
- Stanislav Kosior (1889–1939), Polish-born Soviet politician
- Stanislav Kravchenko (born 1967), Ukrainian jurist
- Stanisław Król (1916–1944), Polish fighter pilot
- Stanisław Kulczyński (1895–1975), Polish politician
- Stanisław Kunicki (1860–1886), Polish revolutionary
- Stanisław Lamczyk (born 1957), Polish politician
- Estanislao López (1786–1838), governor and caudillo of Santa Fe, Argentina
- Stanislav Lunev, Soviet military officer
- Stanisław Łyżwiński (born 1954), Polish politician
- Stanisław Maczek (1892–1994), Polish tank commander of World War II
- Stanisław Małachowski (1736–1809), Polish statesman
- Stanislav Markelov (1974–2009), Russian lawyer
- Stanisław Masternak (1946–2022), Polish farmer and politician
- Stanislav Melnyk (1961–2015), Ukrainian politician
- Stanisław Mikołajczyk (1901–1966), Polish politician
- Stanisław Motty (1826–1900), Polish parliamentarian
- Stanisław Narutowicz or Stanislovas Narutavičius (1862–1932), Polish-Lithuanian lawyer and politician
- Stanislav Naumov (born 1972), Russian politician
- Stanislav Nikolaenko (born 1956), Ukrainian politician
- Stanislav Osadchiy (born 1951), Russian diplomat
- Stanisław Osiecki (1875–1967), Polish politician
- Stanisław Julian Ostroróg, Polish colonel and Royal photographer
- Stanisław Ostrowski (1892–1982), Polish politician
- Stanisław Ostwind-Zuzga (1899–1945), Polish resistance member
- Stanisław Ożóg (born 1953), Polish politician
- Stanisław Papież (1965–2023), Polish politician
- Stanisław Patek (1866–1944), Polish lawyer, freemason and diplomat
- Stanislav Pavlovschi (born 1955), Moldovan politician
- Stanisław Pawlak (born 1933), Polish diplomat
- Stanislav Petrov (1939–2017), Soviet Air Defense Forces lieutenant colonel
- Stanisław Pięta (born 1971), Polish politician
- Stanisław Piosik, Polish politician
- Stanislav Polčák (born 1980), Czech politician
- Stanislav Poplavsky (1902–1973), general in the Soviet and Polish armies
- Stanisław Florian Potocki (1776–1830), Polish general
- Stanisław Prutis (born 1948), Polish jurist and professor of law
- Stanisław Radkiewicz (1903–1987), Polish communist
- Stanislav Redens (1892–1940), Soviet NKVD official
- Stanisław Rydzoń (born 1950), Polish politician
- Stanisław Ryniak (1915–2004), Polish political prisoner
- Stanisław Sędziak (1913–1978), Polish army officer and partisan leader
- Stanislav Shumovsky (1902–1984), former soldier and Soviet spy
- Stanislav Shushkevich (1934–2022), Belarusian statesman and scientist
- Stanisław Skalski (1915–2004), Polish fighter ace during World War II
- Stanisław Skarżyński (1899–1942), Royal Air Force officer
- Stanisław Skrzeszewski (1901–1978), Polish politician
- Stanisław Smoleń (born 1952), Polish diplomat
- Stanisław Sojczyński (1910–1947), Polish Army officer
- Stanisław Sosabowski (1892–1967), Polish general in World War II
- Stanislav Stanilov (born 1943), Bulgarian politician and historian
- Stanisław Kostka Starowieyski (1895–1941), Polish officer, social activist, blessed
- Stanislav Stashevsky (born 1943), Ukrainian politician
- Stanisław Stec (born 1941), Polish politician
- Stanisław Stempowski (1870–1952), Polish-Ukrainian politician
- Stanisław Stomma (1908–2005), Polish lawyer
- Stanislav Stoyanov (born 1981), Bulgarian politician
- Stanislav Strebko (1937–2008), Soviet sailor and Ukrainian politician
- Stanisław Stroński (1882–1955), Polish politician
- Stanisław Świtalski, Polish colonel general
- Stanisław Szczepanowski (1846–1900), Polish businessman and politician
- Stanisław Szmajzner, Polish-born Holocaust survivor
- Stanisław Szwed (born 1955), Polish politician
- Stanisław Taczak (1874–1960), Polish general
- Stanisław Thugutt (1873–1941), Polish politician
- Stanislaw Tillich (born 1959), German CDU politician of Sorbian ethnicity
- Stanislaw Trabalski (1896–1985), German politician
- Stanisław Trepczyński (1924–2002), Polish diplomat
- Stanisław Tymiński (born 1949), Polish-Canadian politician
- Stanisław Tyszka (born 1979), Polish politician and university lecturer
- Stanislav Vorobyov (born 1960), Russian ultra-nationalist leader
- Stanislav Voskresensky (born 1976), Russian politician
- Stanisław Waltoś (born 1932), Polish legal scholar and academic
- Stanisław Wigura (1903–1932), Polish aircraft designer and aviator
- Stanisław Witkowski (1883–1957), Polish Army officer and politician
- Stanisław Wojciechowski (1869–1953), Polish President
- Stanisław Gabriel Worcell (1799–1857), Polish revolutionary
- Stanisław Wycech (1902–2008), Last Polish veteran of World War I
- Stanisław Wyganowski (1919–2017), Polish politician and economist
- Stanisław Zadora, Polish politician
- Stanisław Zając (1949–2010), Polish lawyer and politician
- Stanisław Zenon Zakrzewski, Polish sailing activist
- Stanislav Žalud (1932–2023), Czech politician
- Stanisław Żaryn (born 1984), Polish politician
- Stanisław Zarzecki (1915–1939), corporal pilot of the Polish Armed Forces
- Stanislav Zas (born 1964), Belarusian general and politician
- Stanisław Żelichowski, Polish politician
- Stanislav Zimprich (1916–1942), Czech pilot who flew with the RAF in the Battle of Britain
- Stanisław Żmijan, Polish politician
- Stanisław Żółtek (born 1956), Polish politician and a former member of the European Parliament
- Stanisław Żurakowski (1920–2023), Polish war veteran and historian
- Stanisław Zybała (1924–2002), Polish political prisoner, resistance member, economist and activist
- Stanisław Żytkowski (1948–2022), Polish lawyer and politician

=== Music ===
- Stanislas de Barbeyrac, French operatic tenor
- Stanisław Barcewicz (1858–1929), Polish violinist, conductor and teacher
- Stanislav Baretsky (born 1972), Russian musician
- Stanislav Binički (1874–1942), Serbian composer, conductor and pedagogue
- Stanislav Bunin (born 1966), Russian-born pianist
- Stanisław Drzewiecki (born 1987), Polish pianist and composer
- Stanislao Gastaldon (1861–1939), Italian composer of light music
- Stanislav Gorkovenko (1938–2018), Soviet and Russian composer
- Stanislav Gribkov, Russian conductor
- Stanisław Grzesiuk (1918–1963), Polish singer and writer
- Stanislav Heller (1924–2000), German musician
- Stanislav Igolinsky (born 1953), Russian pianist
- Stanislav Ioudenitch (born 1971), Uzbekistani-born pianist
- Stanislav Khegai, Kazakhstani classical pianist
- Stanislav Khristenko (born 1984), Ukrainian pianist
- Stanislav Leontiev, Russian operatic tenor
- Stanislao Mattei (1750–1825), Italian composer, musicologist and teacher
- Stanisław Moniuszko (1819–1872), Polish composer, conductor and teacher
- Stanislav Neuhaus (1927–1980), Soviet-Russian classical pianist
- Stanislav Pozhlakov (1937–2003), Russian composer
- Stanko Premrl (1880–1965), author of the music for the Slovenian National Anthem
- Niska (born Stanislas Dinga Pinto), French rapper
- Stanisław Radwan (1939–2023), Polish composer
- Stanisław Skrowaczewski (1923–2017), Polish composer and conductor
- Stanisław Sojka (born 1959), Polish singer
- Stanisław Sylwester Szarzyński, Polish composer
- Stanisław Wiechowicz (1893–1963), Polish composer
- Stanisław Wisłocki (1921–1998), Polish conductor
- Stanisław Majda, former Polish rapper known professionally as "Stasio"

=== Sports ===
- Stanislav Agkatsev (born 2002), Russian football player
- Stanislav Alshevsky (born 1991), Russian ice hockey player
- Stanislav Andreev (born 1988), Uzbekistani footballer
- Stanisław Andrzejewski (1916–1997), Polish footballer
- Stanislav Angelov (born 1978), Bulgarian footballer
- Stanislav Angelovič (born 1982), Slovak footballer
- Stanisław Aniołkowski (born 1997), Polish cyclist
- Stanislav Antipin (born 1995), Russian footballer
- Stanislav Antonov (born 1986), Bulgarian footballer
- Stanislav Atrashkevich (born 2002), Belarusian footballer
- Stanislav Bachev (born 1978), Bulgarian footballer
- Stanislav Bacílek (1929–1997), Czech ice hockey player
- Stanislav Balán (born 1986), Czech ice hockey player
- Stanisław Baran (1920–1993), Polish footballer
- Stanislav Baranov (born 2005), Finnish footballer
- Estanislau Basora (1926–2012), Spanish Catalan footballer
- Stanislav Batishchev (1940–2011), Soviet weightlifter
- Stanislav Benyov (born 1991), Bulgarian luger
- Stanislav Bessmertny (born 2004), Russian footballer
- Stanislav Biblyk (born 2001), Ukrainian footballer
- Stanislav Bičák (1905–1947), Czech swimmer
- Stanislav Bilenkyi (born 1998), Ukrainian footballer
- Stanislav Birner (born 1956), Czech tennis player
- Stanisław Bobak (1956–2010), Polish ski jumper
- Stanislav Bocharov (born 1991), Russian professional ice hockey player
- Stanislav Bogdanovich (1993–2020), Ukrainian chess player
- Stanislav Bohush (born 1983), Ukrainian footballer
- Stanislav Bondarenko (born 1987), Ukrainian judoka
- Stanislav Bondarev (born 1968), Russian footballer
- Stanislav Boreyko (born 1965), Russian canoeist
- Stanislav Boyadzhiev (1945–2020), Bulgarian basketball player
- Stanislav Buchnev (born 1990), Armenian footballer
- Stanisław Bukowski (1923–2002), Polish cross-country skier
- Stanisław Burza (born 1977), Polish speedway rider
- Stanisław Burzyński (1948–1991), Polish association football player
- Stanislav Chalaev (born 1986), New Zealand weightlifter
- Stanislav Chaplygin (born 1967), Russian footballer
- Stanislav Cherchesov (born 1963), Russian football manager and former international goalkeeper
- Stanisław Chiliński (1956–2024), Polish wrestler
- Stanislav Chistov (born 1983), Russian ice hockey player
- Stanislav Chokhlaev (born 1989), Russian cross-country skier and biathlete
- Stanislav Cifka, Czech Magic: The Gathering player
- Stanisław Cikowski (1899–1959), Polish footballer
- Stanisław Czaykowski (1899–1933), Polish racing driver
- Stanisław Czulak (1900–1974), Polish footballer
- Stanisław Gąsienica Daniel (born 1951), Polish ski jumper
- Stanislav Danko (born 1994), Slovak footballer
- Stanisław Dawidczyński (born 1944), Polish football manager
- Stanislav Demkiv (born 2000), Ukrainian footballer
- Stanislav Denisov (born 1993), Russian taekwondo fighter
- Stanislav Detkov (born 1980), Russian snowboarder
- Stanislav Dineykin (born 1973), Russian volleyball player
- Staņislavs Dobrotvorskis (born 1961), Latvian modern pentathlete
- Stanislav Donets (born 1983), Russian swimmer from Dimitrovgrad
- Stanislav Dostál (footballer, born 1963), Czech footballer
- Stanislav Dostál (born 1991), Czech footballer
- Stanisław Dragan (1941–2007), Polish boxer
- Stanislaw Drahun (born 1988), Belarusian footballer
- Stanislav Drastich (born 1954), Czech ice dancer
- Stanislav Dryanov (born 1995), Bulgarian footballer
- Stanislav Dubrovin (born 1974), Russian-Uzbekistani footballer
- Stanislav Dubrovsky (born 1974), Russian Nordic combined skier
- Stanislav Emelyanov (born 1990), Russian race walker
- Stanislav Eremin (born 1985), Russian volleyball player
- Stanislav Fajstavr (born 1943), Czech biathlete
- Stanislav Feoktistov (1965–2017), Russian footballer
- Stanislav Filimonov (born 1979), Kazakhstani ski jumper
- Stanisław Flanek (1919–2009), Polish footballer
- Stanisław Fołtyn (1936–2003), Polish footballer
- Stanisław Frączyk (born 1952), Austrian-Polish para table tennis player
- Stanisław Fryźlewicz (born 1944), Polish ice hockey player
- Stanislav Galiev (born 1992), Russian ice hockey player
- Stanislav Galimov (born 1988), Russian ice hockey player
- Stanisław Gazda (1938–2020), Polish cyclist
- Stanislav Genchev (born 1981), Bulgarian footballer
- Stanislav Georgiev (born 1971), Bulgarian sprinter
- Stanislav Gnedko (born 1987), Belarusian footballer
- Stanislav Goldberg (born 1992), Estonian footballer
- Stanislav Gomozkov (born 1948), Soviet table tennis player
- Stanislav Goncharov (born 1983), Russian footballer
- Stanisław Gościniak (born 1944), Polish volleyball player and coach
- Stanislav Govedarov (born 1980), Bulgarian basketball player
- Estanislao Goya (born 1988), Argentine professional golfer
- Stanisław Grędziński (1945–2022), Polish sprinter
- Stanislav Griga (born 1961), Slovak retired football player and manager
- Stanislav Grigorov (born 1968), Bulgarian wrestler
- Stanislav Gron (born 1978), Slovak ice hockey player
- Stanisław Grzelak (1920–?), Polish cyclist
- Stanisław Gzil (born 1949), Polish footballer
- Stanisław Hachorek (1927–1988), Polish footballer and coach
- Stanislav Henych (born 1949), Czech cross-country skier
- Stanislav Hofmann (born 1990), Czech association footballer
- Stanislav Honcharenko (born 1960), Soviet footballer and coach
- Stanislav Horuna (born 1989), Ukrainian karateka
- Stanislav Hudec (born 1982), Slovak ice hockey player
- Stanislav Hudzikevych (born 1978), Ukrainian footballer
- Stanislav Iljutcenko (born 1990), Russian-German footballer
- Stanislav Ivanov, multiple people
- Stanisław Iwaniak (born 1948), Polish volleyball player
- Stanislav Izhakovsky (born 1994), Belarusian footballer
- Stanisław Jankowiak (1941–1999), Polish canoeist
- Stanislav Jarábek (born 1938), Slovak footballer
- Stanislav Jasečko (born 1972), Slovak ice hockey player
- Stanisław Jasiński (born 1959), Polish equestrian
- Stanisław Jaskułka (born 1958), Polish long jumper
- Stanislav Ježek (born 1976), Czech slalom canoeist
- Stanislav Ježík (born 1972), Slovak cross-country skier
- Stanislav Jirkal (1955–2002), Czech sports shooter
- Stanislas Julien (1797–1873), French sinologist
- Stanislav Jungwirth (1930–1986), Czechoslovak runner
- Stanislav Karakoz (born 1999), Russian footballer
- Stanislav Karasi (born 1946), Serbian football manager and player
- Stanisław Karpiel (1909–1992), Polish cross-country skier
- Stanisław Karwat (born 1965), Polish footballer
- Stanislav Kašpárek (born 1996), Czech handball player
- Stanisław Kasprzyk (1942–2022), Polish hockey player
- Stanislav Katana (born 1992), Ukrainian footballer
- Stanisław Kawulok (born 1953), Polish Nordic combined skier
- Stanisław Kaźmierczak, multiple people
- Stanislav Khan (born 1987), Russian footballer
- Stanislav Kharitonov (born 1980), Russian footballer
- Stanislav Khoteyev (born 1981), Russian footballer
- Stanislav Kišš (born 1978), Slovak footballer
- Stanislav Kitto (born 1972), Estonian footballer
- Stanislav Klobása (born 1994), Czech footballer
- Stanisław Klocek (born 1955), polish ice hockey player
- Stanisław Kohn, Polish chess player
- Stanislav Kokorin (born 1990), Russian speed climber
- Stanislav Kokoyev (born 1985), Russian footballer
- Stanislav Kolář (1912–2003), Czech table tennis player
- Stanislav Kolykhalov (born 1986), Russian Paralympic footballer
- Stanislav Komočar (born 1967), Slovenian footballer
- Stanislav Konopásek (1923–2008), Czechoslovak ice hockey player and coach
- Stanislav Kostov (born 1991), Bulgarian footballer
- Stanisław Kostyra (born 1951), Polish chess player
- Stanislav Kotyo (born 1994), Ukrainian footballer
- Stanislav Koval (born 2002), Ukrainian footballer
- Stanislav Kovalev (born 1991), Russian figure skater
- Stanislav Kovalov (born 1991), Ukrainian rower
- Stanisław Kowal (1928–2001), Polish triple jumper
- Stanisław Kowalczewski (1890–1939), Polish sports shooter
- Stanisław Kowalski (1910–2022), Polish athlete and supercentenarian
- Stanisław Kozera (born 1943), Polish rower
- Stanislav Kozubek (born 1980), Czech cyclist
- Stanislav Kozyrev (born 1987), Russian footballer
- Stanislav Krapukhin (born 1998), Russian footballer
- Stanislav Kravchuk (born 1978), Ukrainian freestyle skier
- Stanislav Krejčík (born 1972), Czech footballer
- Stanislav Kritsyuk (born 1990), Russian footballer
- Stanislav Kriventsov (born 1973), Canadian chess player and coach
- Stanislav Kropilák (1955–2022), Slovak basketball player
- Stanislav Krystin (born 2001), Ukrainian footballer
- Stanisław Krzesiński (born 1950), Polish wrestler
- Stanislav Kubíček (born 1940), Czech speedway rider
- Stanislav Kukurudz (born 1998), Ukrainian acrobatic gymnast
- Stanislav Kulinchenko (born 1971), Russian handball player
- Stanislav Kulish (born 1989), Ukrainian footballer
- Stanisław Kuryłłowicz (1909–1945), Polish rower
- Stanislav Kuzma (born 1976), Slovenian footballer
- Stanislav Kuzmin (born 1986), Kazakhstani swimmer
- Stanislav Lapkes (born 2006), Belarusian footballer
- Stanislav Larionov (born 1976), Russian football player
- Stanislav Lebamba (born 1988), Russian footballer
- Stanislav Lebedintsev (born 1978), Russian footballer
- Stanislav Leonovich (1958–2022), Russian pair skater and coach
- Stanislav Levý (born 1958), Czech footballer and manager
- Stanislav Loban (born 1977), Ukrainian footballer
- Stanislav Lobotka (born 1994), Slovak footballer
- Stanislav Lopachuk (born 1992), Belarusian ice hockey player
- Stanislav Lopukhov (born 1972), Russian breaststroke swimmer
- Stanislav Loska (born 1968), Czech paralympic athlete
- Stanisław Lubiejewski (born 1947), Polish hammer thrower
- Stanislav Luca (born 1986), Moldovan footballer
- Stanislav Lugailo (1938–2021), Ukrainian volleyball player
- Stanisław Łukaszczyk (born 1944), Polish biathlete
- Stanislav Lunin (1993–2021), Kazakhstani footballer
- Stanislav Lysenko (born 1972), Russian footballer
- Stanislav Magkeyev (born 1999), Russian footballer
- Stanisław Majcher (1936–2014), Polish footballer
- Stanisław Majerczak, Polish canoeist
- Stanisław Makowiecki (1942–2015), Polish wrestler
- Stanisław Makowiejew (born 1991), Polish handball player
- Stanisław Makula, Polish sport pilot
- Stanislav Malamov (born 1989), Bulgarian footballer
- Stanisław Malczyk (1910–1973), Polish footballer
- Stanisław Małysa (born 1960), Polish weightlifter
- Stanislav Manolev (born 1985), Bulgarian footballer
- Stanislav Marek (born 1970), Czech footballer
- Stanislav Mareyev (born 1996), Russian footballer
- Stanisław Marucha (1937–2008), Polish sports shooter
- Stanislav Matyash (born 1991), Russian footballer
- Stanislav "Slava" Medvedenko (born 1979), Ukrainian basketball player
- Stanislav Medřík (born 1966), Slovak ice hockey player
- Stanislav Melnykov (born 1987), Ukrainian hurdler
- Stanislav Micinski (1899–1955), Romanian footballer
- Stanisław Mielech (1894–1962), Polish footballer
- Stanislav Mikheev (born 1989), Russian luger
- Stan Mikita (born Stanislav Guoth, 1940–2018), Slovak/Canadian ice hockey player for the Chicago Blackhawks
- Stanislav Morarenko (born 2001), Ukrainian professional footballer
- Stanislav Morozov (born 1979), Ukrainian pairs figure skater
- Stanislav Moskvin (1939–2025), Russian cyclist and coach
- Stanisław Motyka (1906–1941), Polish Olympic skier
- Stanislav Murikhin (born 1992), Russian footballer
- Stanislav Murygin (born 1984), Russian footballer
- Stan Musial (born Stanisław Musiał, 1920–2013), American baseball player
- Stanislav Mykytsey (born 1989), Ukrainian footballer
- Stanislav Namașco (born 1986), Moldovan footballer
- Stanislav Neckář (born 1975), Czech ice hockey player
- Stanislav Nedkov (born 1981), Bulgarian mixed martial arts fighter
- Stanislav Nenashev (born 1934), Soviet hammer thrower
- Stanislav Nikitin (born 1995), Russian freestyle skier
- Stanislav Nohýnek (born 1983), Czech footballer
- Stanislav Oksenenko (born 2006), Ukrainian footballer
- Stanisław Olczyk (1932–1996), Polish ice hockey player
- Stanisław Olejniczak (1938–2022), Polish basketball player
- Stanislav Olejník (born 2002), Slovak footballer
- Stanislav Oliferchyk (born 1996), Ukrainian diver
- Staņislavs Olijars (born 1979), Latvian hurdler
- Stanisław Oślizło (born 1937), Polish footballer
- Stanislav Ossinskiy (born 1984), Kazakhstani backstroke swimmer
- Stanislav Otáhal (1913–2004), Czech middle-distance runner
- Stanisław Ożóg (1930–1998), Polish long-distance runner
- Stanisław Paczka (1945–1969), Polish luger
- Stanislav Palkin (born 1996), Kazakhstani speed skater
- Stanisław Pastecki (1907–1988), Polish ice hockey player
- Stanisław Pawłowski (born 1966), Polish wrestler
- Stanisław Pawlusiak (born 1958), Polish ski jumper
- Stanislav Pelc (born 1955), Czechoslovak footballer
- Stanislav Peredystyi (born 1989), Ukrainian footballer
- Stanislav Pertsov (born 1992), Ukrainian figure skater
- Staņislavs Petkēvičs (1908–1960), Latvian athlete
- Stanislav Petkov (born 1987), Bulgarian volleyball player
- Stanislav Petrík (born 1977), Slovak ice hockey player
- Stanislav Petrov (born 1979), Bulgarian footballer
- Stanislav Petukhov (born 1937), Russian ice hockey player
- Staņislavs Pihockis (born 1988), Latvian footballer
- Stanisław Piłat (1909–1993), Polish boxer
- Stanisław Podgórski (1905–1981), Polish cyclist
- Stanislav Pokhilko (born 1975), Russian ski jumper
- Stanislav Polodna (born 1989), Czech ice hockey player
- Stanislav Pozdnyakov (born 1973), Russian fencer and president of the Russian Olympic Commission
- Stanislav Prins (born 1988), Estonian footballer
- Stanislav Procházka (born 1973), Czech ice hockey player
- Stanislav Prokofyev (born 1987), Russian footballer
- Stanislav Prychynenko (born 1991), Ukrainian-Russian footballer
- Stanislav Prýl (1942–2015), Czech ice hockey player
- Stanisław Przybylski, polish modern pentathlete
- Stanislav Ptáčník (born 1956), Czech luger
- Stanisław Ptak (1902–1939), Polish footballer
- Stanislav Pukhov (born 1977), Russian badminton player
- Stanislav Rabotov (born 2002), Bulgarian footballer
- Stanislav Rajdl (1911–?), Czechoslovak boxer
- Stanislav Řezáč (born 1973), Czech cross-country skier
- Stanislav Reznikov (born 1986), Russian footballer
- Stanisław Rola (born 1957), Polish race walker
- Stanislav Romanov (born 1987), Russian ice hockey player
- Stanisław Romik (1926–2016), Polish sports shooter
- Stanisław Różankowski (1925–2004), Polish footballer
- Stanislav Ruban (born 2005), Ukrainian-born Russian footballer
- Stanislav Rudenko (born 1962), Russian footballer
- Stanislav Rumenov (born 1980), Bulgarian footballer
- Stanislav Rybalchenko (born 1971), Ukrainian weightlifter
- Stanislav Sajdok (born 1983), Czech sprint hurdler
- Stanislav Savchenko (born 1967), Ukrainian chess grandmaster
- Stanislav Sazonovich (born 1992), Belarusian footballer
- Stanislav Sel'skiy (born 1991), Russian rugby union player
- Stanislav Selyanin (born 1936), Soviet speed skater
- Stanislav Semenov (born 1990), Russian judoka
- Stanislav Senyk (born 1996), Ukrainian male athlete
- Stanislav Šesták (born 1982), Slovak football striker
- Stanislav Sharay (born 1997), Ukrainian footballer
- Stanislav Sharov (born 1995), Russian basketball player
- Stanislav Shopov (born 2002), Bulgarian footballer
- Stanislav Shtanenko (born 1996), Ukrainian football player
- Stanislav Shvedov (born 1998), Kazakhstani water polo player
- Stanislav Shymansky (born 1985), Ukrainian canoeist
- Stanisław Gąsienica Sieczka (1904–1975), Polish ski jumper
- Stanisław Sieniawski (1949–2020), Polish footballer
- Stanislav Škorvánek (born 1996), Slovak ice hockey player
- Stanisław Skupień (1907–1983), Polish ice hockey player
- Stanisław Skwira (born 1951), Polish modern pentathlete
- Stanisław Sobczyński (born 1951), Polish footballer
- Stanislav Sorokin, multiple people
- Stanisław Sośnicki (1896–1962), Polish sprinter
- Stanisław Stachura (born 1941), Polish association football player and manager
- Stanisław Stefański (born 1947), Polish sailor
- Stanislav Štefkovič (1929–2023), Slovak decathlete
- Stanislav Stepashkin (1940–2013), Russian boxer
- Stanislav Stoyanov (footballer) (born 1976), Bulgarian football defender
- Stanislav Strelchanka (born 1983), Belarusian canoeist
- Stanislav Štrunc (1942–2001), Czech footballer
- Estanislao Struway, (born 1968) Paraguayan football midfielder
- Stanisław Styrczula (1929–2020), Polish biathlete
- Stanislav Sukhina (born 1968), Russian footballer
- Stanislav Sventek (1930–2000), Czech ice hockey player
- Stanislav Svoboda, multiple people
- Stanislav Svozil (born 2003), Czech ice hockey player
- Stanisław Swatowski (1934–2008), Polish sprinter
- Stanisław Świerk (1935–2004), Polish footballer and coach
- Stanisław Świętochowski (1899–1940), Polish sprinter
- Stanisław Szczepaniak (1934–2015), Polish biathlete
- Stanisław Szenic (1904–1987), Polish lawyer and writer
- Stanisław Szlendak (1920–1998), Polish ice hockey player
- Stanisław Szostecki (1968–2021), Polish wrestler
- Stanisław Szozda (1950–2013), Polish cyclist
- Stanislav Tarasenko (born 1966), Russian long jumper
- Stanislav Tarasyuk (born 1987), Russian footballer
- Stanislav Tecl (born 1990), Czech footballer
- Stanisław Terlecki (1955–2017), Polish footballer
- Stanislav Timchenko (born 1983), Russian figure skater
- Stanisław Tkocz (1936–2016), Polish speedway rider
- Stanislav Todorov, Bulgarian international referee
- Stanislav Topinka (born 2006), Russian footballer
- Stanislav Tskhovrebov (born 1969), Russian footballer and coach
- Stanislav Tsonkov (born 1991), Bulgarian basketball player
- Stanislav Tůma (born 1948), Czech former wrestler
- Stanislav Tymofeyenko (born 1989), Ukrainian basketball player
- Stanislav Tyshchenko (born 1974), Ukrainian-Russian footballer and manager
- Stanislav Tyulenev (born 1973), Kyrgyzstani footballer
- Stanisław Urban (1907–1940), Polish rower
- Stanisław Ustupski (born 1966), Polish Nordic combined skier
- Stanislav Vagaský (born 1974), Slovak boxer
- Stanislav Vahala (born 1960), Czech footballer
- Stanislav Varga (born 1972), Slovak footballer
- Stanislav Vávra (born 1993), Czech footballer
- Stanislav Velický (born 1981), Slovak footballer
- Stanislav Vezhel (born 1958), Belarusian former racewalker
- Stanislav Vidaković (born 1985), Croatian footballer
- Stanislav Vlček (born 1976), Czech football striker
- Stanislav Volzhentsev (born 1985), Russian cross-country skier
- Stanislav Vorotilin (1938–2013), Russian footballer and manager
- Stanislav Vovk (born 1991), Russian tennis player
- Stanisław Wagner (born 1947), Polish sprinter
- Stanislas "Stan" Wawrinka (born 1985), Swiss professional tennis player
- Stanisław Waśkiewicz (1947–2012), Polish middle-distance runner
- Stanislaw Więciorek (born 1965), Polish rugby player
- Stanisław Wierzbicki (1959–2018), Polish rower
- Stanisław Wieśniak (1930–2012), Polish rower
- Stanisław Wilczyński (1900–1982), Polish cross-country skier
- Stanisław Wójcik (1904–1981), Polish footballer
- Stanisław Wołodko (1950–2021), Polish discus thrower
- Stanisław Wróblewski (1959–2019), Polish wrestler
- Stanislav Zabrodsky (born 1962), Kazakh archer
- Stanislav Zakharchenko (born 1994), Russian footballer
- Stanislav Zakharov (born 1981), Russian pairs figure skater
- Stanislav Zavidonov (1934–2021), Russian footballer and coach
- Stanisław Zawadski (born 1984), Polish chess player
- Stanisław Zduńczyk (born 1942), Polish volleyball player
- Stanislav Zhekov (born 1980), Bulgarian footballer
- Stanislav Zhmakin (born 1982), Russian ice hockey winger
- Stanislav Zhuk (1935–1998), Soviet figure skater and coach
- Stanislav Zhukov (born 1992), Ukrainian handball player
- Stanisław Zieliński (1912–1939), Polish cyclist
- Stanisław Ziemiański (1892–1965), Polish footballer and referee
- Stanisław Ziffer (1904–?), Polish athlete

=== Other ===
- Estanislao (c. 1798–1838), Native American chieftain
- Stanislav of Lesnovo (fl. 1330–42), Serbian monk-scribe
- Stanislav Andreski (1919–2007), Polish-British sociologist
- Stanisław Arnold (1895–1973), Polish historian
- Stanislav Arzhevitin (born 1961), Ukrainian businessman
- Stanislav Beloruscev, Russian serial killer
- Stanisław Bielecki (born 1946), Polish chemist
- Stanisław Biniecki (1907–1999), Polish chemist
- Stanko Bloudek (1890–1959), Slovenian plane and automobile designer
- Stanisław Bolkowski (1930–2023), Polish engineer
- Stanislav Braginsky (1926–?), Russian geophysicist
- Stanisław Brzozowski (1878–1911), Polish philosopher
- Stanislav Buyanskiy (born 1980), Russian scholar
- Stanislao Cannizzaro (1826–1910), Italian chemist remembered for the Cannizzaro reaction and the Karlsruhe Congress of 1860
- Stanisław Chełchowski (1866–1907), Polish botanist
- Stanisław Czerniecki, Polish soldier, property manager, chef and writer
- Stanislav George Djorgovski, American scientist
- Stanislav Drobyshevsky (born 1978), Russian anthropologist
- Stanisław Dubois (1901–1942), Polish journalist and political activist
- Stanisław Dziwisz (born 1939), Polish prelate of the Roman Catholic Church
- Stanislav Emelianov, professor of biomedical engineering
- Stanisław Estreicher (1869–1939), Polish historian
- Stanisław Feliksiak (1906–1992), Polish zoologist
- Stanisław Flejterski (born 1948), Polish economist and professor
- Stanisław Gebhardt (1928–2025), Polish economist and activist
- Stanisław Gołąb (1902–1980), Polish politician
- Stanislaw Gonerka (1927–1987), Polish murderer
- Stanisław Grabski (1871–1949), Polish economist and politician
- Stanislav Grof (born 1931), one of the founders of the field of transpersonal psychology
- Stanislaus Grumman, character from His Dark Materials
- Stanisław Grzepski, Polish humanist mathematician
- Stanisław Herbst (1907–1973), Polish historian
- Stanislaus Hosius (1504–1579), Polish Roman Catholic cardinal and Prince-Bishop of Warmia
- Stanisław Jankowski (1911–2002), Polish architect and resistance fighter
- Stanisław Jaśkowski (1906–1965), Polish logician and philosopher
- Stanisław Gustaw Jaster (1921–1943), Polish escapee from Auschwitz
- Stanisław Jastrzębski, Polish writer, lawyer and historian
- Stanislaus Joyce (1884–1955), brother of James Joyce
- Stanisław Bonifacy Jundziłł (1761–1847), Polish priest and botanist
- Stanisław Karczewski (born 1955), Polish surgeon and politician
- Stanislaus Katczinsky, All Quiet on the Western Front character
- Stanisław Kętrzyński (1878–1950), Polish historian
- Stanisław Kluza (1972–2006), Polish economist and politician
- Stanisław Knapowski (1931–1967), Polish mathematician
- Stanislav Komárek (born 1958), Czech biologist, philosopher and writer
- Stanisław Komorowski (1953–2010), Polish physician and diplomat
- Stanisław Konturek (1931–2019), Polish physiologist and gastroenterologist
- Stanisław Kostanecki (1860–1910), Polish chemist
- Stanisław Kot (1885–1975), Polish historian
- Stanislav Kozlovsky (born 1976), Russian scientist-psychologist
- Stanisław Krajewski, Polish philosopher
- Stanisław Kronenberg (1846–1894), Polish financier
- Stanisław Krzyżanowski (1874–1917), Polish physician
- Stanislav Kudzh (born 1979), Russian scientist
- Stanislaw "Stanley" Kuklinski (1906–1977), father of Richard Kuklinski
- Stanislav Kurilov (1936–1998), Soviet, Canadian, and Israeli oceanographer
- Stanisław Kuś (1925–2020), Polish constructor and architect
- Stanisław Kutrzeba (1876–1946), Polish historian
- Stanislav Lakoba (1953–2025), Abkhazia academician and politician
- Stanisław Leśniewski (1886–1939), Polish mathematician and philosopher
- Stanisław Leszczycki (1907–1996), Polish geographer
- Stanisław Lisowski (1880–1964), Polish-Lithuanian librarian
- Stanisław Łojasiewicz (1926–2002), Polish mathematician
- Stanisław Lorentz (1899–1991), Polish scholar
- Stanisław Maroński (1825–1907), Polish educator and historian
- Stanisław Mazur (1905–1981), Polish mathematician
- Stanislav Menshikov (1927–2014), Russian economist
- Stanislav Mikheyev (1940–2011), Russian physicist
- Stanisław Młodożeniec (1895–1959), Polish futurist
- Stanisław Modzelewski (1929–1969), Polish serial killer
- Stanislav Molchanov (born 1940), Soviet American mathematician
- Stanisław Moskal (1935–2019), Polish scientist and writer
- Stanisław Noakowski (1867–1928), Polish painter and architect
- Stanisław Olszewski (1852–1898), Polish engineer and inventor
- Stanisław Ossowski (1897–1963), Polish sociologist
- Stanisław Pachołowiecki, Polish resistance cartographer
- Stanisław Panczakiewicz, Polish engineer and designer
- Stanisław Pietruski (1811–1874), Polish zoologist and horticulturist
- Stanislav Prokofiev (born 1968), Russian economist
- Stanislaus von Prowazek (1875–1912), Czech zoologist and parasitologist
- Stanisław Radziszowski (born 1953), Polish-American mathematician and computer scientist
- Stanisław Rembek (1901–1985), Polish novelist, teacher and soldier
- Stanislav Rogolev (1941–1984), Soviet serial killer
- Stanisław Rogalski (1904–1976), Polish aircraft designer
- Stanisław Rolbieski, Polish engineer and entrepreneur
- Stanisław Rospond (1906–1982), Polish linguist
- Stanisław Jerzy Rothert (1900–1962), Polish sprinter and journalist
- Stanisław Ruziewicz (1889–1941), Polish mathematician
- Stanisław Saks (1897–1942), Polish mathematician
- Stanisław Salmonowicz (1931–2022), Polish historian
- Stanisław Sarnicki (1532–1597), Polish historian
- Stanisław Sedlaczek (1892–1941), Polish professor and scoutmaster
- Stanislav Segert (1921–2005), scholar of Semitic languages
- Stanislav Shatalin (1934–1997), Soviet and Russian economist
- Stanislav Shatsky (1878–1934), late Tsarist and early Soviet humanistic educator, writer, and educational administrator
- Stanislav Edward Shmelev, ecological economist
- Stanislav Shwarts (1919–1976), Soviet ecologist and zoologist
- Staņislavs Šķesters (born 1958), Latvian engineer and politician
- Stanislav Smirnov (born 1970), Russian mathematician
- Stanisław Smolka (1854–1924), Polish historian
- Stanisław Sołdek (1916–1970), Polish engineer and labour worker
- Stanisław Solski (1622–1701), Polish mathematician and architect
- Stanisław Staszewski (1925–1973), Polish architect and poet
- Stanisław Staszic (1755–1826), Polish philosopher and writer
- Stanislav Strumilin (1877–1974), Soviet economist who developed the Strumilin index
- Stanisław Swianiewicz (1899–1997), Polish economist and historian
- Stanisław Świerczkowski (1932–2015), Polish mathematician
- Stanisław Szarek (born 1953), Polish mathematician
- Stanisław Tochowicz (1923–1994), Polish metallurgist and academic
- Stanisław Tołpa (1901–1996), Polish botanist
- Stanisław Tomkiewicz (1945–2022), Polish journalist, farmer, and politician
- Stanisław Trela (1892–1950), Polish architect
- Stanisław Trybuła (1932–2008), Polish mathematician and statistician
- Stanislaw Ulam (1909–1984), Polish born American mathematician
- Stanisław Urbańczyk (1909–2001), Polish linguist
- Stanislav Vydra (1741–1804), Bohemian writer, mathematician and Jesuit
- Stanisław Wawrzecki (1921–1965), Polish criminal
- S. L. Woronowicz (born 1941), Polish mathematician and physicist
- Stanislaw Zagórski (born 1933), Polish graphic designer
- Stanisław Zahradnik (1932–2023), Polish historian
- Stanisław Zakrzewski (1873–1936), Polish historian
- Stanisław Zaremba (1863–1942), Polish mathematician and engineer
- Stanisław Żaryn (1910–1964), Polish architect
- Stanisław Zawadzki (1743–1806), Polish architect
- Stanisław Zuber (1883–1947), Polish geologist
- Stanisław Żuk (born 1954), Polish engineer and politician

== See also ==
- Stanko
- Stanislav (disambiguation)
- Saint Stanislaus (disambiguation)
