= Kaźmierczak =

Kaźmierczak or Kazmierczak is a Polish-language patronymic surname derived from the given name Kazimierz.

Notable people with the surname include:

- Anthony Kazmierczak, American man who plead guilty to assaulting U.S. Representative Ilhan Omar
- Barbara Kazmierczak, American microbiologist
- Grzegorz Kaźmierczak (born 1964), Polish poet
- Ludwig Kasner (born Ludwik Kaźmierczak; 1896–1959), German policeman
- Marie Kazmierczak (1920–2000), American basketball outfielder
- Monika Kaźmierczak, Polish musician
- Przemysław Kaźmierczak (born 1982), Polish footballer
- Stanisław Kaźmierczak, multiple persons
- Steven Kazmierczak (1980–2008), perpetrator of the 2008 Northern Illinois University shooting
- Stanley Kazmierczak Keyes (born 1953), Canadian diplomat and politician
