= Tomkiewicz =

Tomkiewicz is a Polish surname. Notable people with the surname include:

- Micha Tomkiewicz (born 1939), Polish scientist, professor and writer
- Stanisław Tomkiewicz (1945–2022), Polish journalist, farmer, and politician
