= Stasiak =

Origin
- Origin: Poland
- Meaning: Derived from the personal name "Stasio"

Stasiak is a Polish surname of patronymic origin. It is derived from the personal name "Stasio", a pet form of the name "Stanisław", and the suffix "-ak", denoting "descendant of". So, the surname Stasiak signifies "son or descendant of Stasio (Stanisław)".

Notable people with this surname include:

- Aron Stasiak (born 1999), Polish footballer
- Damian Stasiak (born 1990), Polish mixed martial artist
- Jurek Stasiak, Polish-Australian tennis player
- Ludwik Stasiak, Polish painter, writer and publisher
- Karolina Stasiak, Polish official and diplomat
- Małgorzata Stasiak, Polish handball player
- Michał Stasiak, Polish football player
- Paweł Stasiak (born 1967), Polish singer
- Sebastian Stasiak (born 1994), Polish modern pentathlete, Olympian
- Shawn Stasiak, Canadian chiropractor and semi-retired professional wrestler
- Stan Stasiak, former Canadian professional wrestler, father of professional wrestler Shawn Stasiak
- Waldemar Stasiak (born 1969), Polish entrepreneur
- Władysław Stasiak, Polish politician

== See also ==
- Stasiak KSZO Celsa Ostrowiec Świętokrzyski, Polish football club
- Stasiak Opoczno, Polish football club
