= Feoktistov (disambiguation) =

Feoktistov may refer to:

- Anton Feoktistov (born 2001), Russian para-athlete
- Igor Feoktistov (1928–2013), Soviet sprint canoeist
- Konstantin Feoktistov (1926–2009), Soviet aerospace engineer and cosmonaut
  - Feoktistov (crater), lunar crater named for Konstantin Feoktistov
- Stanislav Feoktistov (born 1965), Russian footballer
