= Gapicomine =

Chemical compound

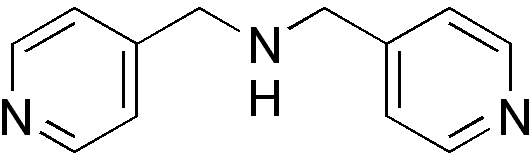

Clinical data
- Routes of administration: By mouth (tablet)
- ATC code: none

Legal status
- Legal status: off market (was used in EU countries)

Identifiers
- IUPAC name: 1-Pyridin-4-yl-N-(pyridin-4-ylmethyl)methanamine
- CAS Number: 1539-39-5
- PubChem CID: 68955
- ChemSpider: 62178
- UNII: WWW0P95393
- ChEMBL: ChEMBL2103958
- CompTox Dashboard (EPA): DTXSID10165477

Chemical and physical data
- Formula: C_{12}H_{13}N_{3}
- Molar mass: 199.257 g·mol^{−1}
- 3D model (JSmol): Interactive image
- SMILES: n1ccc(cc1)CNCc2ccncc2
- InChI: InChI=1S/C12H13N3/c1-5-13-6-2-11(1)9-15-10-12-3-7-14-8-4-12/h1-8,15H,9-10H2; Key:AUQQZPGNRKTPSQ-UHFFFAOYSA-N

Gapicomine (INN) is a coronary vasodilator. It has been withdrawn from the market in the countries it was used in.

Also, gapicomine is a major component in the drug Bicordin.

== History ==
Gapicomine was discovered in 1970 by Polish chemist Stanisław Biniecki. It was first published about in an article of The Polish Journal of Medicine and Pharmacy describing the derivative drug Bicordin in 1974.

== Synthesis ==
Patent:

The oxime formation between isonicotinaldehyde [872-85-5] (1) and hydroxylamine gives 4-Pyridinealdoxime [696-54-8] (2). This is then reduced by catalytic hydrogenation over Raney-Nickel into 4-Picolylamine [3731-53-1] (3). Reductive amination of the last with a second equivalent of isonicotinaldehyde affords gapicomine (4).
