= Staszel =

Staszel is a Polish-language surname. Originally it was a given name derived from the name Stanislaw, diminutive: Stach. Notable people with the surname include:

- Jan Staszel, Polish cross-country male skier
- Bronisława Staszel-Polankowa (1912–1988), Polish cross-country male skier, 8 times champion of Poland
