= Stachnik =

Stachnik is a Polish-language surname. Originally it was a given name derived from the name Stanislaw, diminutive: Stach. Notable people with the surname include:

- Sebastian Stachnik (born 1986), German footballer
- Walter Stachnik, Inspector General of the U.S. Securities and Exchange Commission
