= Stachyra =

Stachyra is a Polish-language surname. Originally it was a given name derived from the name Stanislaw, diminutive: Stach. Notable people with the surname include:

- Kamil Stachyra (born 1987), Polish footballer
- Michał Stachyra (born 1978), Polish game designer and publisher

== See also ==
- Stachura (surname)
