= Stachura (surname) =

Polish surname

Stachura is a Polish-language surname. Originally it was a given name derived from the name Stanisław, diminutive: Stach. Notable people with the surname include:

- Bogusław Stachura (1927–2008), Polish Communist politician
- Bożena Stachura (born 1974), Polish actress
- Cyril Stachura (born 1965), Slovak footballer and manager
- Danyło Stachura (1860–1936), Austrian politician
- Dariusz Stachura (born 1962), Polish tenor
- Edward Stachura (1937–1979), Polish poet and writer
- Ewa Stachura (born 1957), Polish architect
- Jan Stachura (born 1948), Polish cyclist
- Jerzy Stachura (1937–2008), Polish pathologist
- Jerzy Stachura (poet) (born 1956), Polish poet
- Maciej Stachura, Polish rugby union player
- Peter Stachura, British historian and writer
- Stanisław Stachura (born 1941), Polish football manager

== See also ==
- Stachyra
