= Stasiuk =

Stasiuk is a Ukrainian-language surname. Originally it was a given name derived from the name Stanislaw, diminutive: Stach. Notable people with the surname include:

- Andrzej Stasiuk, Polish writer
- Vic Stasiuk, Canadian retired professional ice hockey left winger and a former NHL head coach
- Peter Stasiuk, Canadian-born Australian Ukrainian Greek Catholic hierarch
- Iryna Charnushenka-Stasiuk, Belarusian long jumper
- Melissa Stasiuk, Ukrainian-born Argentinian model
- Mykola Stasyuk, Ukrainian politician
