= Stanislav Leontiev =

Russian operatic tenor

Stanislav Leontiev (Russian: Станислав Леонтьев) is a Russian operatic tenor who was born in Leningrad. He graduated from the Glinka Choral School of the Academic Capella and Rimsky-Korsakov Conservatory in 1995 and 2000 respectively. Prior to joining with Mariinsky Theatre in 2010, he used to be the Zazerkalie Theatre soloist.

== Mariinsky Theatre repertoire ==
- Khovanshchina — Minion
- Boris Godunov — Misail
- Eugene Onegin — Monsieur Trique
- Semyon Kotko — Mikola
- Dead Souls — Seliphan
- Il barbiere di Siviglia — Almaviva
- The Marriage of Figaro — Don Bazilio
- Aida — Messenger
- Rigoletto — Duke of Mantua
- Macbeth — Malcolm
- Oedipus Rex — Shepherd
- Les Troyens — Iopas
- A Midsummer Night's Dream — Flute
- The Makropulos Affair — Count Hauk-Šendorf
- La vida breve — 1st and 2nd voices of Salesman
