= Stanisławski =

The name Stanisławski (feminine: Stanisławska; plural: Stanisławscy) is a Polish surname. Derived forms are Stanislowski or Stanislavsky. The name is a toponym rather than a patronymic and literally means 'a person from a place such as Stanisławice, Stanisław, or Stanisławów'. Of the latter alone, there are at least seven villages of the same name in Poland. The name of the place itself traces back to Stanisław, a popular given name and the name of Poland's national patron saint. Today, a concentration of the surname Stanisławski can be found particularly in the Polish district of Chojnice as well as in and around Poznań.

Originally a noble name documented since the 14th century, Stanisławski was represented in at least nine noble heraldic clans (Herb), including Kościesza, Sulima, Rola, Pilawa, Radwan, Szeliga, Gryf, Pobóg, and Sas. It therefore belongs to the oldest family names in Poland. Among the Polish bourgeoisie and rural population, surnames only became common between the 16th and 19th centuries.

Heraldic clans were a unique Polish feature. Since 1412, bearing a coat of arms was a privilege of the Polish nobility. Up to several hundred noble families were united in a heraldic clan (Polish: „Herb“, from German: „Erbe“), all of whom bore the same coat of arms. Consequently, there were only about 160–200 different coats of arms in Poland. Families within a heraldic clan were likely related by blood. In contrast, families with the same name from different heraldic clans usually had different origins.

The Polish nobility held a unique position in Europe. Comparable structures can be found in the Scottish clans. Noble titles or predicates, as seen in other European countries, did not exist. Nobles were referred to as „szlachetny“ (noble), „nobilis“ (Latin for nobleman), „dzierżawca“ (leaseholder), „urodzony“ (well-born, landowner), „generosus“ (Latin for magnanimous), „wielmożny“ (venerable), or „magnificus“ (Latin for eminent). Additionally, the terms „dziedzic“ (heir/owner) for landowning nobility or „obywatel/ka“ (citizen) for citizens of the Polish Noble Republic were used. By 1331 at the latest, all nobles in Poland (Szlachta) were legally equal and voted together in the parliament (Sejm). Since 1347, proof of noble descent was a requirement for membership in the nobility. From 1496, land ownership in Poland was tied to noble status. The duties of the nobility included military service on horseback, administration of the country, and the exercise of local jurisdiction. In Poland, the proportion of nobles in the total population was particularly high at 8–10% compared to other countries. As a result, Polish nobles often possessed little land or few serfs and frequently had to till their own fields. Noble status was hereditary and linked to land ownership. If the latter was missing, the active noble status often faded over time.

The surname may refer to:

- Anna Stanisławska (1651–1701), Polish author and poet
- Danuta Stanisławska (born 1958), Polish field hockey player
- Gary Stanislawski (born 1959), American politician
- Holger Stanislawski (born 1969), German football player and manager
- Jan Stanisławski (painter) (1860–1907), Polish painter
- Jan Stanisławski (lexicographer) (1893–1973), Polish lexicographer
- Konstantin Stanislavsky (1863–1938), Russian actor and theater director
- Michael Stanislawski (born 1952), American historian
- Olga Stanisławska (born 1967), Polish writer and freelance journalist
- Teresa Stanisławska-Adamczewska (1924–2003), Polish writer
- Włodzimierz Stanisławski (born 1956), Polish field hockey player

== See also ==
- Stanislavski
