= Stachowski =

Stachowski (feminine Stachowska, plural Stachowscy) is a Polish surname. It may refer to:

- Amber Stachowski, American water polo player
- Marek Stachowski (composer), Polish composer
- Marek Stachowski, Polish linguist
- Monika Stachowska, Polish handball player
- William Stachowski, American politician
