= Stanisław Zenon Zakrzewski =

Polish sailing activist

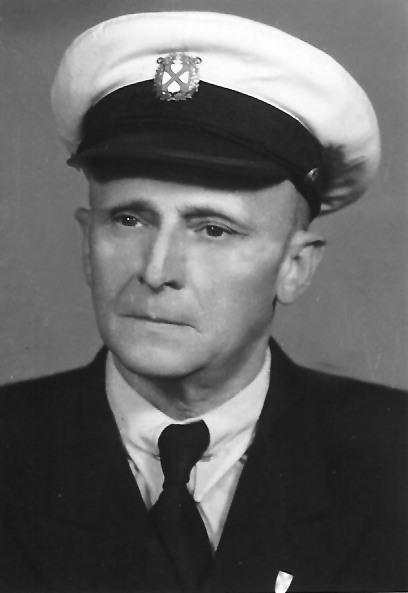
- Born: 1890
- Died: 1976 (aged 85–86)

Stanisław Zenon Zakrzewski (1890–1976) was a Polish sailing activist. He was a co-founder of the Club of Polish Seascapists (Klub Marynistów Polskich), vice-captain of the Yacht Club of Poland (Yacht Klub Polski). Zakrzewski was an author of the first Polish post-World War II yachting handbook Druh wiatr.
