= Stachowicz =

Stachowicz is a Polish surname. The Russian and Belarusian language version is Stakhovich, Ukrainian: Stakhovych

Stachowicz is believed to generally mean family, son, or of bearing to Stanisław/ Stanislav. As the diminutive Stach was commonly used to shorten Stanisław/ Stanislav. The ending -wicz usually implies son of, or clan of.

Notable people with the surname include:

Stachowicz

- Damian Stachowicz (1658–1699), Polish composer
- Mary Stachowicz (1951–2002), American murder victim
- Michał Stachowicz (1768–1825), Polish painter and graphic artist
- Ray Stachowicz (born 1959), American football player

Stakhovich

- Alexey Stakhovich, high-ranking Imperial Russian Chevalier Guard Regiment officer
- Mikhail Aleksandrovich Stakhovich, Russian politician
