= Stanisław Sieniawski =

Polish footballer (1949–2020)

Personal information
- Date of birth: 31 August 1949
- Date of death: 16 September 2020 (aged 71)
- Place of death: Rzeszów, Poland
- Position: Defender

Youth career
- –1969: Stal Rzeszów

Senior career*
Years	Team	Apps	(Gls)
1969–1976	Stal Rzeszów	37+	(3+)
- * Club domestic league appearances and goals

Stanisław Sieniawski (31 August 1949 – 16 September 2020) was a Polish footballer who played as a defender.

He is widely considered one of Stal's legends, as in 1975, at the age of 26, he won the Polish Cup and promotion to the top division, which meant he played in the UEFA Cup Winners' Cup the following season too; hailing the greatest successes of the club to this day. He played in 37 first division matches scoring three goals. He died on 16 September 2020 at the age of 71.

== Honours ==
Stal Rzeszów

- Polish Cup: 1974–75
