= Stanislav Issaev =

Russian Ballet Dancer

Stanislav Issaev (born August 6, 1956, city of Gorky, Russian Federation, USSR) is a Russian ballet teacher and former (1974 - 1990) Principal Dancer with the Moscow Classical Ballet.(Moscow State Ballet Theatre) He studied at the Perm school of ballet (1966 - 1974, class of I.I. Plakht and M.M. Mirgaripov) He toured internationally with Moscow Classical Ballet more than 40 countries before the fall of the USSR.

== Career ==
During his career, Issaev was a frequent partner of Ekaterina Maximova, prima ballerina of the Bolshoi Ballet. In 2009, appeared as a celebrity judge on the NBC show "Superstars of Dance".

Issaev led the dance program at the South Carolina Governor's School for the Arts and Humanities from 2001 to 2013, before going on to be the master men's ballet teacher at the Kirov Academy of Ballet in Washington, DC in 2014. He currently teaches at the CityDance Conservatory at Strathmore, in Washington, DC.

== Awards and honors ==
Issaev won a number of awards during his career, including a gold medal at the Varna International Ballet Competition (1980) and the Vaslav Nijinsky Prize from the Paris Academy of Dance (1984). In 1990, he was named a People's Artist of Russia.
