= Stanislav Shumovsky =

Former soldier and Soviet spy

Stanislav Shumovsky (Russian: Станислав Антонович Шумовский, May 3 1902 - November 4 1984), known as Stan Shumovsky in U.S., was a Soviet former Red Army Soldier, aviator, covert intelligence agent and physicist. Codenamed Agent Blériot, Shumovsky operated in the United States where he along with others leaked aeronautical secrets back to his home country.

== Biography ==
Shumovsky was born in a Polish family in Zhytomyr, Volhynian Governorate. His mother, Amalia Fominichna Kaminskaya (1884-1933), was a pianist; his father, Adam Vikentievich Shumovsky (1873-1928), worked in a bank. He is the eldest of the family's three boys. His brother Theodor is a renowned scholar of Arabian studies. During the World War I, his family moved to Shamakhi, Azerbaijan. In 1919, he joined the Red Army and changed his nationality from 'Pole' to 'Ukrainian'. In the late 1920s, he studied at the aeromechanical faculty of Bauman Moscow State Technical University.

From 1931 to 1935, Stanislav went to the United States officially as an exchange student and worked at M.I.T. where he graduated, specializing in aeronautics and earning a master's degree. Embedded into the United States as part of a 65-strong cohort of Soviet students who had come to America to attend prestigious universities, Stanislav arrived in New York in September 1931. His intelligence was used by the Soviet Union both during the Second World War and the Cold War. It is quite likely that his intelligence was used to create the Tu-4, a Soviet clone of the B-29 Superfortress.

After graduation, he worked at the USSR Embassy in the USA. His brief was to transfer cutting-edge aeronautical technology to the Soviet Union and to recruit American students as spies. He coordinated the flights of Valery Chkalov and Mikhail Gromov, and organized meetings of leading Soviet aircraft designers with major US aviation specialists. He reached such high esteem in the USA that he was invited to parties attended by Shirley Temple, and to the White House to meet then President Franklin D Roosevelt.

He evaded detection his entire life and returned to the Soviet Union in the late 1940s. Before the war, he served as the deputy head of Central Aerohydrodynamic Institute on issues of the latest aviation technology. During the war years, he was part of a group of Soviet specialists managing the supply of aircraft equipment from the United States within the framework of Lend-Lease. After the war, he contributed to the founding of the Moscow Engineering Physics Institute.

== Discovery ==
Archives By-Fellow Svetlana Lokhova at Churchill College, Cambridge discovered Shumovsky's real activity after reading documents and papers from the Mitrokhin Archive. In 2018 she published a book on Stanislav called 'The Spy Who Changed History'. He is believed to be a member of a wider Soviet program aimed at technology transfer from the USA.

== Legacy ==
During the early Cold War, once either superpower could produce atom bombs, delivery of such bomb was of crucial importance. Since rocketry was still in its infancy and ICBMs had yet to be developed, long range bombers were the sole method of delivery. Shumovsky's espionage was an important part of providing a Soviet nuclear deterrent.

== Sources ==
- Wilson, Frances (2018-06-24). "The spy who came into the lab — how the Soviets infiltrated MIT". The Telegraph.
- "The Spy Who Changed History — Archives By-Fellow Svetlana Lokhova on the impact of Soviet infiltration in US universities – Churchill College". www.chu.cam.ac.uk. August 2018.
- Lokhova, Svetlana (2018-06-14). The Spy Who Changed History. William Collins. ISBN 978-0008238117.
