= Stanislav Emelianov =

Professor of biomedical engineering

Stanislav (Stas) Emelianov is a former professor of biomedical engineering at University of Texas at Austin. He is also the founder of Ultrasound Imaging and Therapeutics Laboratory. Since August 2015, he moved to Georgia Institute of Technology, where he has been appointed as the Joseph M. Pettit Chair in Microelectronics and as a Georgia Research Alliance Eminent Scholar. He is based in the Georgia Tech School of Electrical and Computer Engineering with a joint appointment in the Wallace H. Coulter Department of Biomedical Engineering at Georgia Tech and Emory University.
