= Stanisław Krasiński =

Stanisław Krasiński may refer to:

- Stanisław Krasiński (1558-1617)
- Stanisław Krasiński (1585-1649)

== See also ==
- Stanisław Krusiński
