= Stanisław Biniecki =

Polish chemist

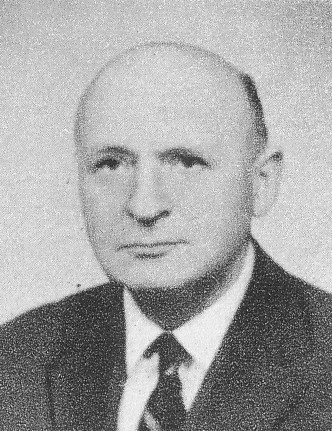
Image of Stanisław Biniecki

Stanisław Biniecki (Polish pronunciation: [staˈɲiswav biˈɲɛt͡skʲi]; born 29 July 1907 in Sławno; died 3 May 1999 in Warsaw) was a Polish doctor, pharmacist, and chemist. He discovered Todralazine (introduced into medical treatment in 1964) and Gapicomine (intouduced in 1970).

== Life ==
He graduated from Państwowe Gimnazjum im. Bolesława Chrobrego w Gnieźnie where he passed his secondary school-leaving examination in 1927. In 1933, he finished his pharmaceutical studies at Adam Mickiewicz University in Poznań. In 1945–1947 he headed the Department of Pharmaceutical Technology at the Faculty of Pharmacy of the University of Poznań, in 1947, after moving to Warsaw, he took a similar position at the Medical Academy, he also became a member of the Main Board of the Polish Pharmaceutical Society. In 1958 he obtained the title of professor and in the same year completed his studies in chemistry with a master's degree.

He is buried at the Powązki Military Cemetery (quarter H II, row 7, grave 20)
