= Staszewski =

Staszewski (feminine Staszewska) is a Polish surname. Notable people include:

- Adrian Staszewski, Polish volleyball player
- Bartosz Staszewski, Polish activist
- Dorota Staszewska, Polish sport sailor
- Kazik Staszewski, Polish singer
- Mariusz Staszewski, Polish speedway rider
- Stanisław Staszewski, Polish architect and poet
- Stefan Staszewski, Jewish-Polish communist apparatchik
