= Stanisław Wawrzecki =

Alleged Polish criminal

- Born: 5 October 1921; Mława, Polish People's Republic
- Died: 19 March 1965 (aged 43); Warsaw, Polish People's Republic
- Employer: Warsaw-Praga Municipal Meat Trading Company
- Criminal charges: Corruption
- Criminal penalty: Execution by hanging
- Children: 3, including Paweł Wawrzecki

Stanisław Wawrzecki (5 October 1921 – 19 March 1965) was a director of State-Directed Meat Trade in Praga (a district of Warsaw), and the last person executed by Poland for economy-related crimes after 1956.

== Biography ==
Warzecki was born into a farming family in Mława, and moved to Warsaw at 20 years old. He was an active member of the Polish United Workers' Party (PZPR), which likely earned him his promotion to the director of the Warsaw-Praga Municipal Meat Trading Company. He was known to be wealthy, with an unspecified media organization writing after his arrest that he owned, amongst other things, "96 gold twenty-dollar coins, two gold ten-dollar coins, seven gold five-ruble coins, 14 gold bars with a total weight of 1.4 kilograms (3.1 lb), nine gold bracelets, a gold watch, 26 rings, including several with diamonds, […] PLN 135,000 in cash and PLN 100,000 in the PKO book, and finally a villa worth half a million in Michałowice, near Warsaw."

One of his sons, Paweł Wawrzecki, became an actor.

== Trial and execution ==
=== Background ===
The demand for meat increased sharply in 1950s Poland due to the rural transplants to cities adopting the excessive consumption of the upper-classes. Poland was exporting its best quality meat abroad, and the best quality meat was the most in demand domestically. This created a vast black market for meat, since the state could not supply enough meat to meet the public's demand for it.

In 1962, there was another meat shortage, which was exacerbated by the "severe winter of 1962/1963" and was followed by "a summer drought". In response, the PZPR rationed meat to restaurants and established new exclusively vegetarian restaurants. These measures failed to improve the supply of meat, so the PZPR established a National Inspectorate for the Meat Economy (Polish: Państwowa Inspekcja Gospodarki Mięsnej) to accompany police investigations into the meat black market. This National Inspectorate discovered the "Meat Scandal".

=== Trial ===
Wawrzecki, was accused of being involved in fraud connected to the "Meat Scandal". He was convicted of corruption and sentenced to death, allegedly without the right to appeal his death sentence, in violation of his rights under the Constitution of the Polish People's Republic.

The government seized Wawrzecki's apartment and forcibly evicted his wife and three children. Several hundred people were arrested as part of the same case. Along with Wawrzecki, four other directors, four shop managers, and the owner of a butcher's shop were also charged. The prosecutor's office sought death sentences for Wawrzecki and two others, Henryk Gradowski and Kazimierz Witowski, but the judge only sentenced Wawrzecki to death. The four directors were sentenced to life imprisonment, and the other seven defendants were sentenced to nine to twelve years in prison, along with state seizure of property and fines. In the 1970s, the life sentences of some of the accused were commuted to 25 years in prison after the introduction of a new penal law.

Three days after his arrest, Wawrzecki admitted to receiving about 3.5 million złoty. Investigators promised him that if he confessed, they would help him get a lower sentence or even a suspended sentence. However, the State Council refused his request for commutation. His trial was influenced by strong pressure from the communist authorities, especially from then PZPR First Secretary, Władysław Gomułka, who had insisted on the death penalty.

Contrary to popular belief, Wawrzecki was not the only person sentenced to death by the Polish People's Republic for economic crimes, but he was the only one on whom the sentence was carried out. In 1960, Bolesław Dedo was sentenced to death for his alleged involvement in the "leather affair", but his sentence was commuted to life imprisonment by the State Council. He was released after he spent more than 17 years in prison.

=== Execution ===
He was hanged on 19 March 1965 in Warsaw.

== Aftermath ==
One of the judges that issued the death sentence, Roman Kryże, inspired the Polish saying "Sądzi Kryże – będą krzyże " ('Kryże is judging – there will be crosses'), referring to the disproportionate amount of death sentences he issued compared to other judges. The Institute of National Remembrance considers Kryże to have acted as "an agent of the apparatus of Stalinist repression". He sentenced over 80 members of the Home Army to death, including resistance leader Witold Pilecki.

According to historian Dariusz Jarosz, Wawrzecki's execution did not "significantly reduce crimes in the meat industry". Historian Jerzy Kochanowski concluded that Wawrzecki's trial "would have not ended as it did" if it was not for the "economic and political environment" surrounding the trial.

In 2004, the Supreme Court of Poland overturned the sentences of the defendants involved in the "Meat Scandal", ruling that the sentences were a miscarriage of justice. Nevertheless, the Court did not pardon Wawrzecki because it was the nature of the sentence which was disputed, rather than his guilt. In 2007, a Warsaw court ruled that Wawrzecki's relatives were not owed compensation for the property that the government had seized from him, citing that the asset seizure was mandatory under the laws at the time and would have been applied even if the court issued a different verdict in 1965. In 2010, a court in Warsaw ruled that the prosecutor of Wawrzecki's trial, Eugeniusz W., could not be prosecuted due to the statute of limitations.

In April 2021, one of Wawrzecki's sons, Piotr Wawrzecki, was granted 200,000 złoty (51813.47 in USD) as compensation.

== See also ==
- Capital punishment in Poland
