= Stanisław Zduńczyk =

Polish volleyball player (born 1942)

Personal information
- Nationality: Polish
- Born: 26 February 1942 (age 83); Łucka, Poland

Sport
- Sport: Volleyball

Stanisław Zduńczyk (born 26 February 1942) is a Polish volleyball player. He competed in the men's tournament at the 1968 Summer Olympics.
