= Stanisław Nogaj =

Polish journalist and writer from Silesia

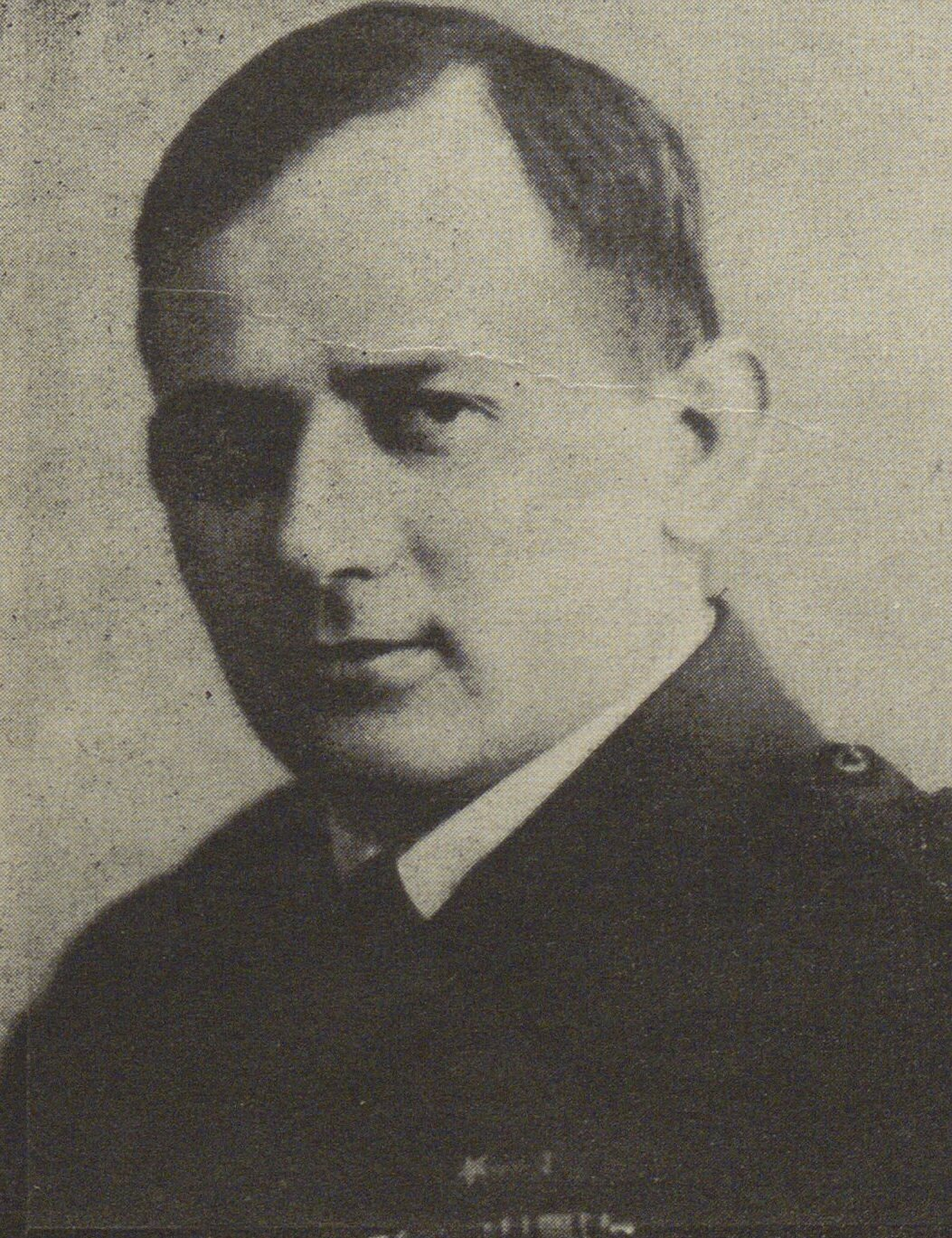
Stanisław Nogaj

Stanisław Nogaj was a Polish journalist and writer from Silesia. During the World War II he was arrested by the Germans and sent to the Dachau concentration camp and then to the Mauthausen-Gusen concentration camp, where he had been working at the camp's chancellery of Concentration Camp Gusen I. After the war his personal notes became one of the bases for estimation of the death toll in that camp. He also published his memoirs of the ordeal.
