= Stashinsky =

Stashinsky, Stashynsky (masculine), Stashinskaya, Stashynskaya (feminine) is an East Slavic surname. Polish variant: Staszyński, Lithuanian: Stašinskas. Notable people with the surname include:

- Bogdan Stashinsky
- Vladislav Stashinsky
