= Stanislav Ivanov =

Stanislav Ivanov may refer to:

- Stanislav Ivanov (footballer, born 1980), Moldovan football player
- Stanislav Ivanov (footballer, born 1999), Bulgarian football player
