= Stanisław Dulias =

Polish politician (1939–2020)

Stanisław Dulias (12 April 1939 – 17 November 2020) was a Polish politician.

== Biography ==
Born in Zbaraż, Ukraine, he served as a member of the Sejm (the lower house of the parliament of Poland. from 2001–2005 for Law and Justice.

Dulias died from COVID-19 in Mysłowice, Poland, on 17 November 2020, at the age of 81.
