= Stanisław Iwaniak =

Polish volleyball player (born 1948)

Personal information
- Nationality: Polish
- Born: 31 August 1948 (age 76); Słupsk, Poland

Sport
- Sport: Volleyball

Stanisław Iwaniak (born 31 August 1948) is a Polish former volleyball player. He competed in the men's tournament at the 1972 Summer Olympics.
