= Stanislav Bartůšek =

Czech journalist

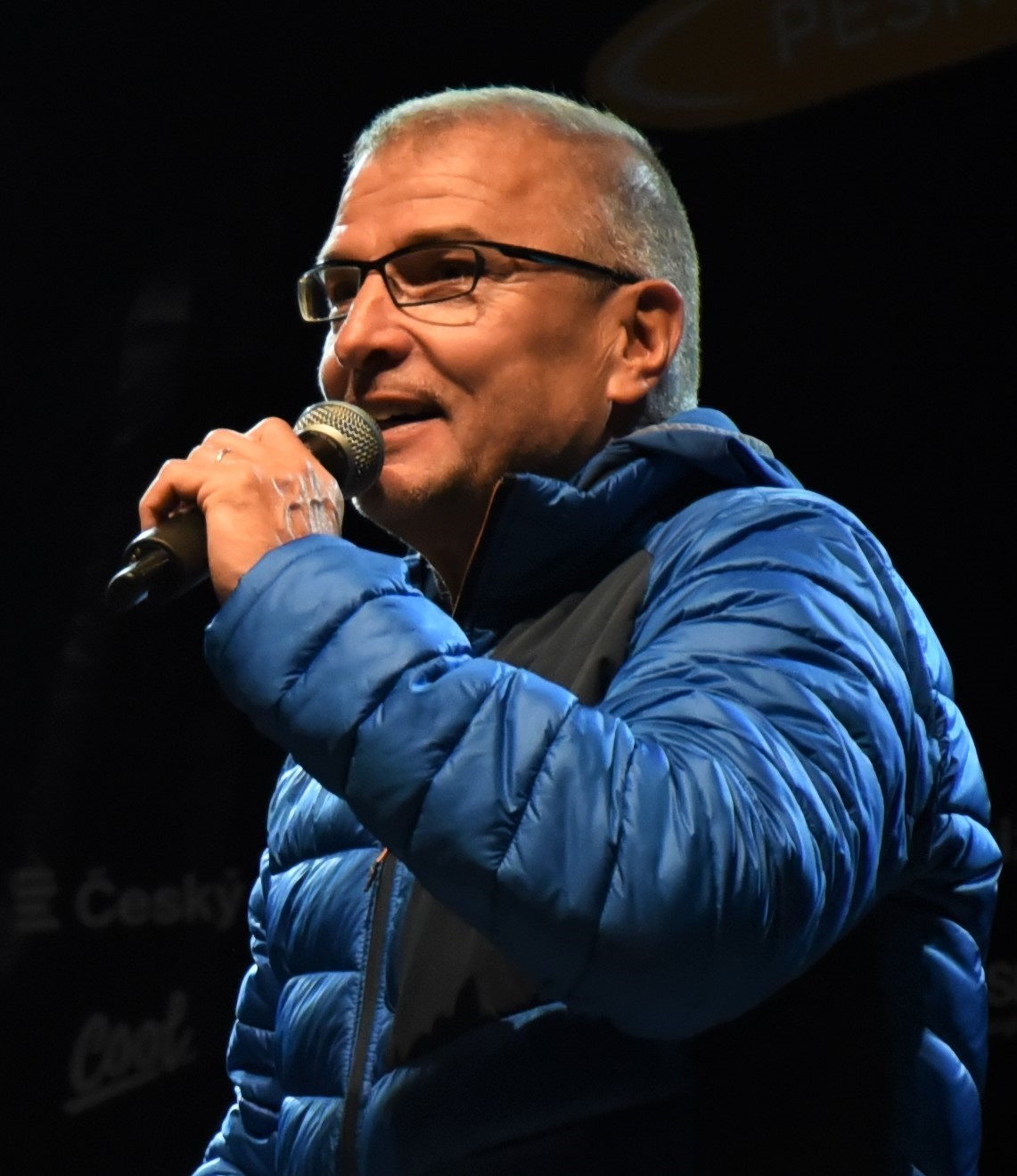
- Bartůšek in 2021
- Born: 19 May 1961 (age 64); Ústí nad Labem, Czechoslovakia
- Occupation: Journalist

Stanislav Bartůšek (born 19 May 1961 in Ústí nad Labem, Czechoslovakia) is a Czech television journalist.

Bartůšek worked as high school teacher before succeeding at the auditions for the sports section of the Czech Television. He presents daily sports news programs and works as a commentator for swimming as well as triathlon events. Bartůšek also has written scripts for several documentaries about various sports.

In 2000, his documentary named Za císaře... (lit. 'For the Emperor...') presenting the life story of Czech cyclist Jan Veselý won the Juan Antonio Samaranch Award at the Santander Sports Movies Festival.

Bartůšek was also a prominent athlete who finished the Hawaii Ironman Triathlon in 2002 and swam across the English Channel in 2005, reaching the seashore after ten hours and seven minutes, the second best national result that time. He participated in the Czech Cho Oyu and Mount Everest expedition.
