= Stanislav Kotyo =

Ukrainian footballer

Personal information
- Full name: Stanislav Ivanovych Kotyo
- Date of birth: 6 April 1994 (age 32)
- Place of birth: Zakarpattia Oblast, Ukraine
- Height: 1.75 m (5 ft 9 in)
- Position: Defender

Youth career
- 2010–2011: Youth Sportive School Uzhhorod

Senior career*
Years	Team	Apps	(Gls)
2013–2016	FC Hoverla Uzhhorod	1	(0)
- * Club domestic league appearances and goals as of 12 August 2016

Stanislav Kotyo (Ukrainian: Станіслав Іванович Котьо; born 6 April 1994 in Zakarpattia Oblast, Ukraine) is a Ukrainian football defender who played for FC Hoverla Uzhhorod in the Ukrainian Premier League.

Kotyo is a product of the Uzhhorod Youth Sportive School System. In 2013, he signed a contract with FC Hoverla, but played only in the FC Hoverla Uzhhorod reserves. In the main-team squad Kotyo made his debut playing as a substitute in the match against FC Volyn Lutsk on 14 May 2016 in the Ukrainian Premier League.

He is a son of the retired Ukrainian footballer Ivan Kotyo, who played for FC Zakarpattia Uzhhorod in the middle 1990s.
