= Stanisław Abłamowicz =

Polish political activist and lawyer

Stanisław Abłamowicz (9 May 1844 – 4 June 1901) was a Polish political activist and lawyer. A member of the January Uprising, he was imprisoned, and from 1870 to exile; was a defender in the political process in Kraków, an activist of the Gymnastic Society "Sokół".
