= Stacher =

Stacher is a surname. Notable people with the surname include:

- Ally Stacher (born 1987), American cyclist
- Joseph Stacher (c. 1902–1977), American mobster
- Joshua Stacher (born 1975), American political scientist

== See also ==
- Sacher
