= Stanisław Solski =

Polish mathematician and architect (1622–1701)

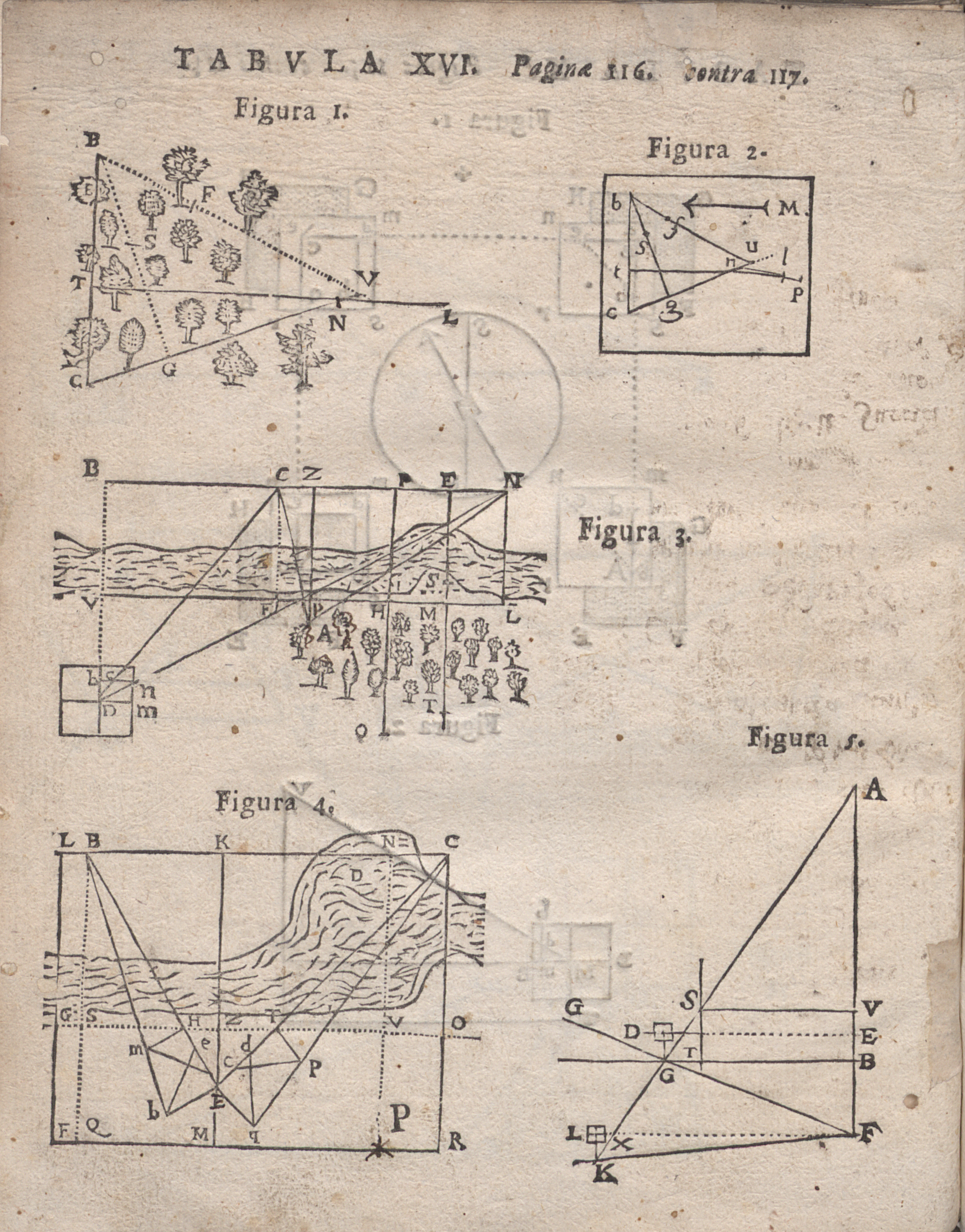
Praxis nova et expeditissima mensurandi geometrice, 1688

Stanisław Solski (September 21, 1622, in Kalisz – August 9, 1701, in Kraków) was a Polish Jesuit mathematician and architect. He published several works in Polish and Latin.

== Life ==
There aren't information on early life and origin. Solski joined the Jesuit Order in 1638, before he studied in a school in Kalisz. He studied philosophy in Kalisz and then theology in Poznań. From 1652 to 1653 he was a teacher of poetry in Krosno and from 1653 to 1654 he taught poetry and rhetoric in Kamieniec Podolski. In 1670 he left the mansion and move to Cracow where he occupied primarily architectural work, because he was the architect of the bishop Jan Malachowski. He designed and supervised the reconstruction and construction of churches and monasteries, including the church of St. Barbara.

== Works ==
- Machina motum perpetuum exhibens, 1661
- Machina exhibendo motui perpetuo artificiali idonea, 1663
- Geometra Polski: Księga 1, Księga 2, Księga 3, 1683–1686
- Architekt Polski, 1688
- Solski, Stanislaw (1688). Praxis nova et expeditissima mensurandi geometrice (in Latin). Cracoviae: Franciszek Cezary.
