= Stanislav Zimprich =

Czech pilot (1916–1942)

Stanislav Zimprich (3 March 1916 – 12 April 1942) was a Czech pilot who flew with the RAF in the Battle of Britain.

== Biography ==
Stanislav Zimprich was born on 3 March 1916 at Havlíčkův Brod in Bohemia, Austria-Hungary (now the Czech Republic). He joined the Military Aviation Academy at Prostějov for pilot training, and was posted to the academy at Hranice where he graduated in 1937. He was then posted to the 5th Air Regiment. When Germany occupied Czechoslovakia in March 1939, Zimprich was demobilised with all the other members of the Air Force, but on 29 May, he and five Air Force colleagues escaped to Poland. They travelled at first by train, and then walking across the Ostravia region and over the border into Poland. After being briefly interned by the Polish authorities, the six Czech personnel were transferred to Kraków and reported to the Czechoslovak Consulate. On 17 June, Zimprich and forty-one other Czech airmen sailed from Gdynia on the Sobieski, arriving at Boulogne on 18 June 1939.

The Czechoslovak airmen were required to join the French Foreign Legion for a five-year period, with the agreement that, should war be declared, they would be transferred to French military units. Zimprich was placed in the Legion barracks at Nanterre, near Paris, and then transferred to the training base at Sidi Bel Abbès, Algeria. When war broke out he was transferred to l'Armée de l'Air and was posted to its Paris airbase. On 1 December 1940 he was posted to CIC Chartres for training on French equipment. He completed this training on 18 May 1940 and was assigned to GC I/8, based at Chantilly-les-Aigles, north of Paris. The rapidity of the German advance in May 1940 caused GCI/8 to move frequently as it retreated westward. By mid-June it was at Corme-Ecluse, near Royan, in south west France. When France collapsed, the Czech airmen of GCI/8 were released from l’Armee de l’Air service, and they travelled to the port of Bayonne. On 22 June they boarded the Konig Emma which landed them in England at Plymouth two days later.

Zimprich was at 4 Recruit Centre until 1 July when he went to the RAF Czechoslovak Depot at Cosford. He was commissioned in the RAFVR on 12 July and he joined 310 Squadron at Duxford. He made his first operational flight on 18 August. Zimprich probably destroyed two Bf 110's on 7 September, destroyed a Do 17 and damaged a Bf 110 on 9 December, and probably destroyed a Do 17 on 18 December.

Still with 310 Squadron as a Flight Lieutenant, 26 year-old Zimprich died on 12 April 1942 during a combat training exercise using on-board cine cameras with six other 310 Squadron Spitfires near Perranporth airfield in Cornwall. He was flying Spitfire BL497, and appeared to make a mock attack, coming from the port side rear of Spitfire AD420 flown by Sergeant Stanislav Halama. He clipped the tail of Halama's aircraft causing it to go into a vertical dive and crash into Gear Sands, killing the pilot. Zimprich's Spitfire was seen to be flying very low from the sandhills towards the beach, its undercarriage up, but with its flaps down and the engine cut. Zimprich overshot the beach and landed in the sea, close to the shore. For some minutes, shore observers saw the tail of the Spitfire sticking out from the sea and a dark object, wearing a life jacket, floating away from it. An attempt was made to form a human chain to reach the aircraft but the people were beaten back by the sea. Zimprich's body was washed up near Combe Martin on 20 July.

Flight Lieutenant Stanislav Zimprich was buried in St Augustine's Churchyard, Heanton Punchardon, North Devon, on 22 July 1942.

He is credited with one confirmed and four probable kills. He mainly flew in a Hawker Hurricane. He was featured on a Czechoslovak postage stamp in 1945.
