= ELiX Group =

Polish manufacturer of air fresheners and home fragrance products

ELiX
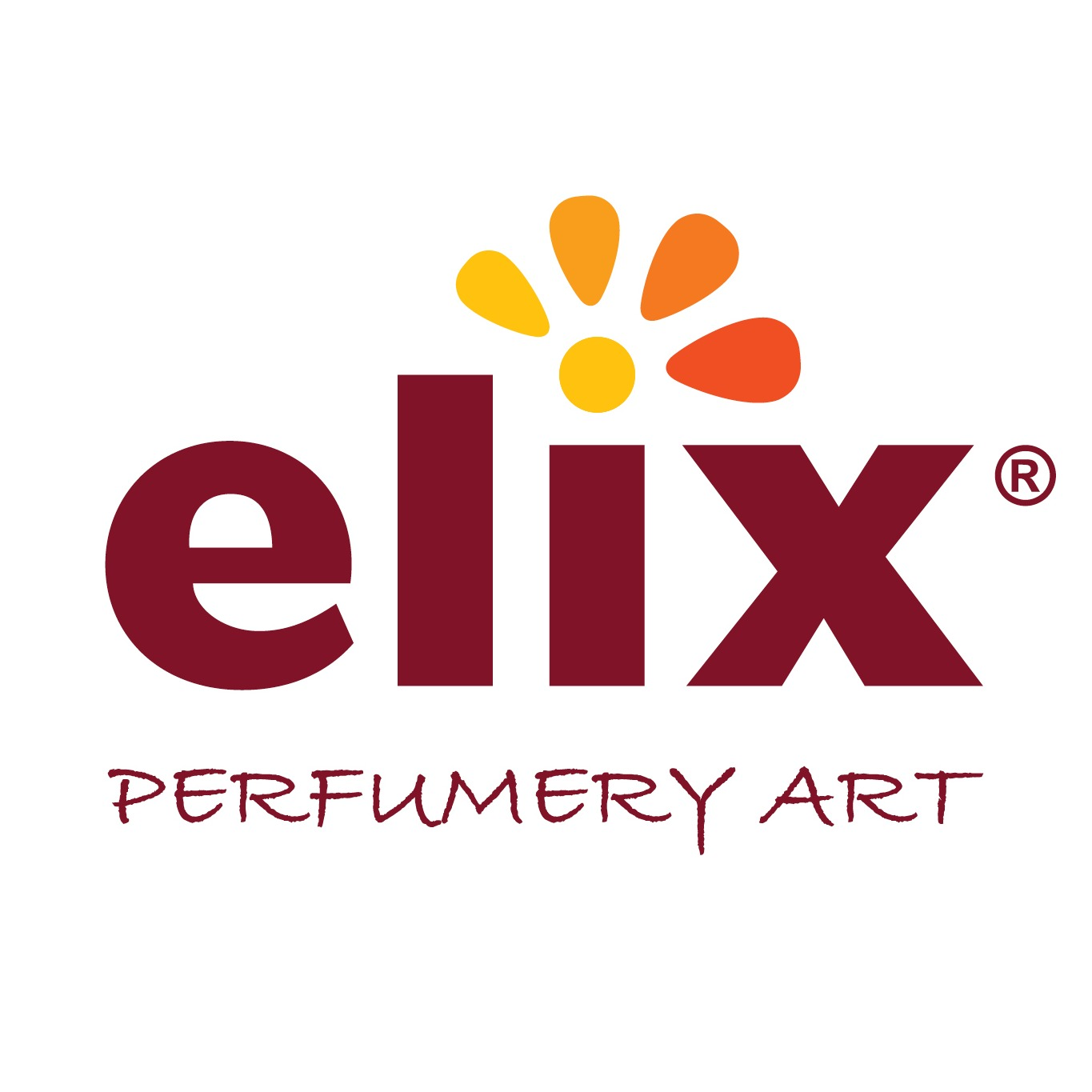
- Native name: MB ELiX sp. z o.o. sp.k.
- Type: Limited partnership (sp. k.) with a limited-liability company (sp. z o.o.) as general partner
- Industry: Consumer goods (air fresheners; home fragrance)
- Founded: 1999
- Headquarters: Wrocław, Poland
- Area served: Europe, Middle East, Asia (exports)
- Products: Air fresheners for automotive and household use
- Brands: ELiX, Aromatone, Amarella
- Website: https://elixscent.com/

ELiX (also stylized as MB ELiX sp. z o.o. sp.k.) is a Polish manufacturer of air fresheners and home fragrance products headquartered in Wrocław, Poland. The company supplies the automotive and household sectors under its own brands and via private-label contracts, with exports to multiple regions. The company manufactures air-care and fragrance products and supplies own brands and private-label/OEM programmes. Registry and directory profiles indicate the current limited-partnership form dates to 25 March 2008; the Polish Automotive Group lists ELiX as founded in 1999.

== History ==
The business traces its origins to 1999 in Wrocław. In March 2008 it was reorganized as MB ELiX sp. z o.o. sp.k. (a limited partnership with a limited-liability company as the general partner).

In 2000, the word mark elix was filed with Poland’s Patent Office (UPRP). The sign appears in the official journal Wiadomości Urzędu Patentowego 09/2004 and is recorded under registration no. R.15152 in the UPRP registry.

== Operations ==
ELiX manufactures air-freshening products for both automotive and household use from its Wrocław site. According to an industry cluster profile, the firm also operates a second production facility in New Delhi serving the Indian market.

== Products and brands ==
The company produces a range of car and home air fresheners under its own labels and for retail private labels. External exhibitor listings and industry sources attribute to ELiX the brand lines Aromatone and Amarella.

== Trade fairs and market activity ==
ELiX regularly presents at international trade fairs:

- Automechanika Dubai (2022) – listed exhibitor (Hall 8, stand F21).
- Private Label Middle East, Dubai (2024/2025 cycle) – organizer’s site lists MB ELiX sp. z o.o. sp.k. as an exhibitor (Hall 8, D8-19) with brand pages for ELiX, Aromatone and Amarella.
- Taipei AMPA / Autotronics Taipei (2023) – participation noted in a Taiwan mission coordinated by the Polish Automotive Group (PGM).

In 2025 ELiX formed part of a Lower Silesia (Poland) beauty & cosmetics delegation to Singapore. Coverage by public agencies and trade media reported on the regional stand and participating firms, with mentions of ELiX and its fragrance lines.

ELiX also markets ODORANO (odour-neutralisation approach) and RELAXEEN (herb-based fragrance line); these are brands and technologies rather than patents and are documented primarily in company communications.

== Relations with the United Arab Emirates ==
Poland and the UAE intensified economic engagement around 2015, including a Poland–UAE business forum in Abu Dhabi and subsequent Joint Economic Committee work, documented by UAE government and state media.

== Certifications ==
Independent registries indicate ELiX previously held the following certifications:

- ISO 9001 – DEKRA record shows certificate 000112006/2 for ELIX Sp. z o.o.; MB ELIX Sp. z o.o. Sp.k., later withdrawn (2016-10-19).
- GMP for cosmetics (ISO 22716) – PIHZ Certyfikacja registry lists certificate 9/22716 for MB Elix (status: withdrawn).

The company’s own materials state compliance with BRCGS, ISO 9001, ISO 14001, and TÜV SÜD standards; the BRCGS Directory is the official database for BRC certifications, though public listings can be limited by status or visibility settings.

== Corporate social responsibility ==
During the COVID-19 pandemic, ELiX donated disinfectants to major Wrocław hospitals; the city’s official portal reported the initiative, and later press coverage quoted company management on regional support.

== Waldemar Stasiak ==
Waldemar Stasiak
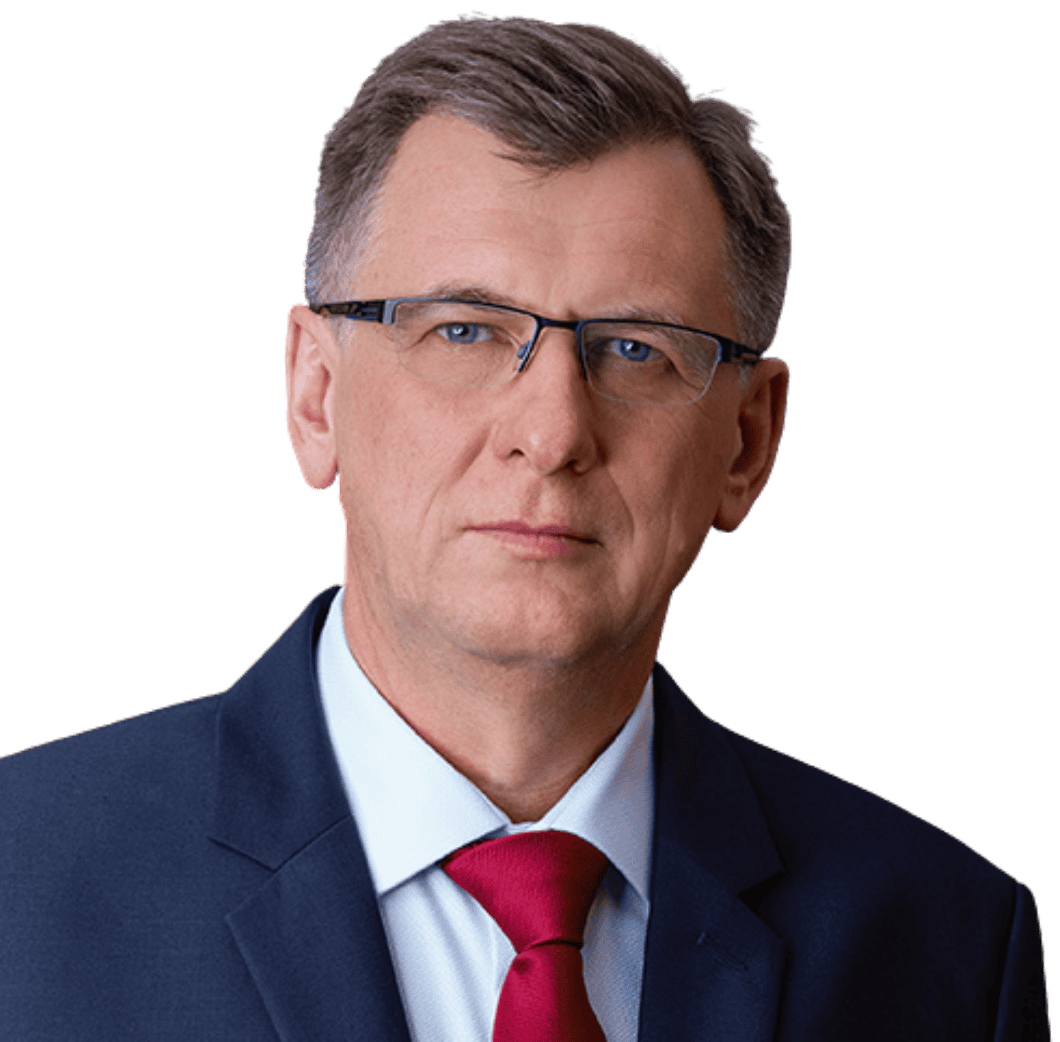
- Born: August 27, 1969 (age 57); Jelenia Góra, Poland
- Education: Wrocław University of Science and Technology
- Occupations: Entrepreneur, scent-marketing specialist
- Known for: Founder and president of ELiX

Waldemar Stasiak (born 27 August 1969) is a Polish entrepreneur who is a specialist in aroma marketing and in the impact of scents on consumer behaviour and quality of life. He is the founder and president of ELiX.

=== Early life and education ===
Stasiak was born in Poland in 1969 and graduated from the Wrocław University of Science and Technology, Faculty of Computer Science and Management. As part of research into how scent influences purchasing decisions, he compiled a knowledge base on scent marketing; the results were published in 2005 in the journal Marketing w Praktyce as “Czar aromamarketingu / The Charm of Aromamarketing”.

=== Career ===
Stasiak has been associated with ELiX since the enterprise’s beginnings. In industry programming, Stasiak has appeared as a speaker on practical applications of generative AI for SMEs (Polish Automotive Group, 11 May 2023).

=== Product development and intellectual property ===
A vent-mounted gel air freshener (Polish: „Żelowy odświeżacz powietrza”) naming Waldemar Stasiak as inventor was disclosed in the Polish Patent Office bulletin no. 21/2016.

== Publications (selected) ==
- e-Autonaprawa – “Ewolucja samochodowych odświeżaczy zapachowych.” Feature explaining historical and current formats; quotes Stasiak on polymers and delivery safety. (7 Jun 2023).
- MotoPodPrąd – “Zapach nowego samochodu: ELiX ujawnia zapachowe sekrety producentów aut.” (24 May 2023).
- MotoFaktor – “ELiX zachęca zmienić ‘zawieszki’ na ‘polimery’.” (20 Jun 2023).
- MotoWeb – “Zmień klimat we wnętrzu swojego auta.” (17 Apr 2023).
- Przegląd Oponiarski – “Nie zasłaniaj szyby.” (2025).
- Świat Opon – “Jeszcze więcej branży! Rekordowe targi Automechanika Shanghai.” (29 Dec 2016).
- Stasiak, Waldemar. “Czar aromamarketingu.” Marketing w Praktyce 3/2005: 6–9. Indexed in OPAC and cited in later academic works on sensory marketing and olfactory marks.

== Memberships ==
- Polska Grupa Motoryzacyjna (PGM) — ELiX/MB ELiX is listed among PGM members, with a profile describing its product focus and export reach.
