= Stanislav Kokoyev =

Russian footballer (born 1985)

Personal information
- Full name: Stanislav Vadimovich Kokoyev
- Date of birth: 13 November 1985 (age 40)
- Place of birth: Ordzhonikidze, Russian SFSR
- Height: 1.90 m (6 ft 3 in)
- Position: Midfielder

Senior career*
Years	Team	Apps	(Gls)
2003–2006	FC Avtodor Vladikavkaz	91	(15)
2007	FC Alania Vladikavkaz	11	(0)
2008–2009	FC Nosta Novotroitsk	21	(2)
2009	→ FC Torpedo-ZIL Moscow (loan)	16	(2)
2010	FC Avtodor Vladikavkaz	22	(4)
2011	FC Druzhba Maykop	6	(0)
2013	FC Oktan Perm	8	(0)
2014–2015	FC Alania Vladikavkaz	11	(0)
- * Club domestic league appearances and goals

Stanislav Vadimovich Kokoyev (Russian: Станислав Вадимович Кокоев; born 13 November 1985) is a former Russian professional football player.

== Club career ==
He played two seasons in the Russian Football National League for FC Alania Vladikavkaz and FC Nosta Novotroitsk.
