= Stanisław Lisowski =

Polish-Lithuanian librarian (1880–1964)

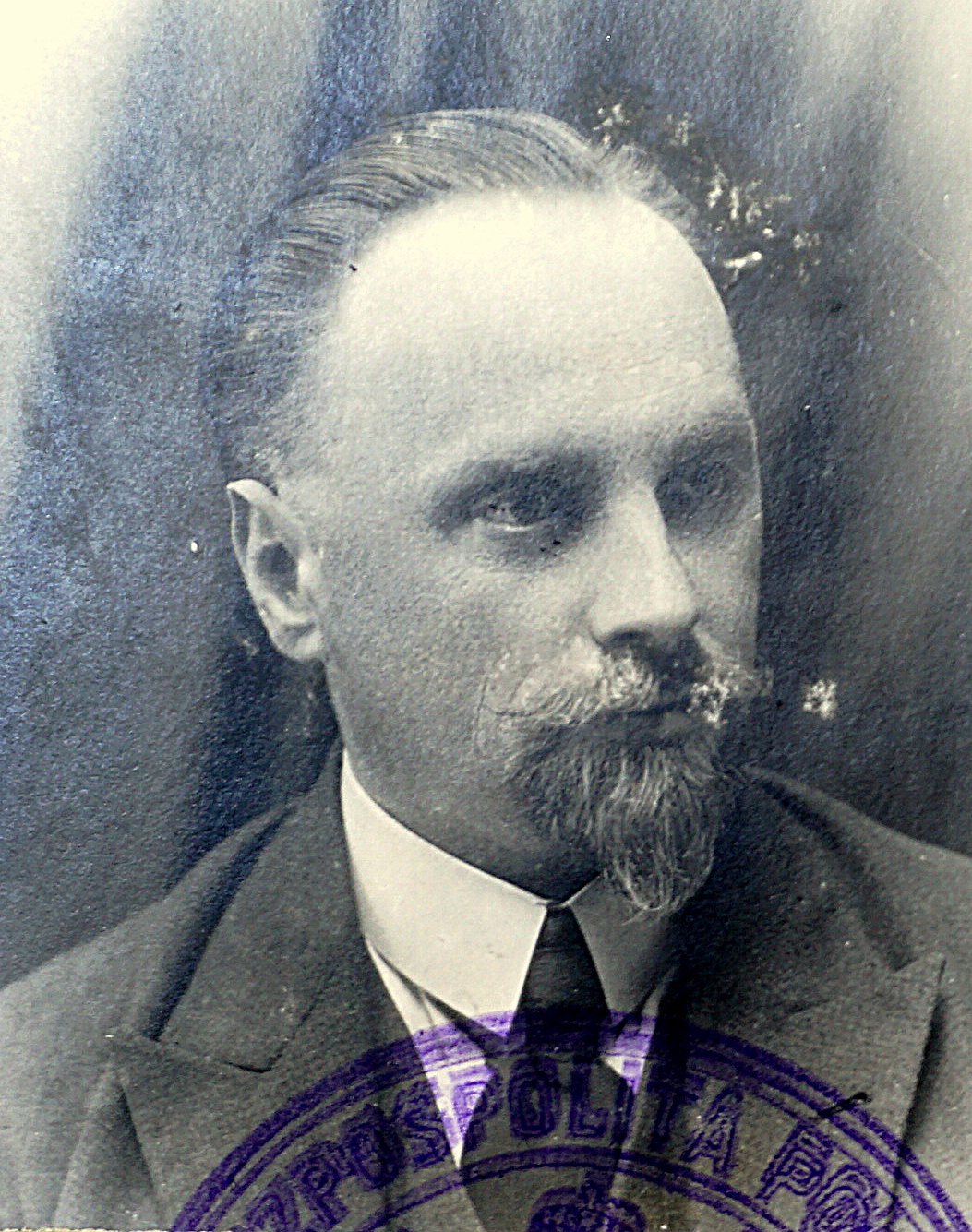
- Born: 1 January 1880; Vilnius, Russian Empire
- Died: 5 October 1964 (aged 84); Toruń, Polish People's Republic
- Education: St. Petersburg University
- Occupations: Librarian, bibliographer, expert in old prints and incunabula, bibliophile, archivist

Stanisław Lisowski (Polish pronunciation: [staˈɲi.swaf liˈsɔf.ski] 1 January 1880 – 5 October 1964) was a Polish-Lithuanian librarian, bibliographer, and an expert in old prints and incunabula. He was archivist in the State Archive in Lublin, custodian of the University Library in Vilnius and the University Library in Toruń, and a member of the Polish delegation of the Special Mixed Commission for the revindication and restitution of Polish cultural property, acting on the basis of Article XI, clause 15 of the Treaty of Riga.

== Early life and education ==
Stanisław Lisowski was born in Vilnius into an impoverished noble family. His father was a railway official.

He graduated from the Classical Gymnasium in Vilnius, an elite secondary school with a profile in humanities and mathematics and natural sciences. After obtaining his secondary school certificate in 1900, he signed up for the Faculty of Law at St. Petersburg University, from which he graduated in 1914 with a first-class degree. As an auditing student, he attended the Faculty of Philology, where he studied philosophy, psychology, introduction to comparative grammar of the Indo-European languages and Bulgarian and Czech. He took classes from Jan Baudouin de Courtenay and Alexei Shakhmatov. At the same time, under the tutelage of Stanisław Ptaszycki, he studied library science and bibliography.

Beginning in 1910, he took an active part in the student bibliographical circle, where he gave a number of lectures on subjects relating to the history of books and libraries, with a particular emphasis on the history of the Polish book and Polish libraries.

== Early library work, travels and research ==
From August 1911 to the end of 1915, Lisowski worked as assistant chief librarian in the Polish book department of the Library of the Russian Academy of Sciences in St. Petersburg.

Lisowski was active in the Russian Bibliographical Society accredited to the academy, in time even becoming a member of its board and delivering a number of lectures this forum on the Polish library science and bibliography.

In 1912, he made a research trip to Bulgaria and Serbia, where he became acquainted with the library system operating there.

In 1913, he was sent by the St. Petersburg Academy of Sciences to Moscow to attend library courses in order to improve his expertise in the library science. On his return to his former position in the library, he prepared a report for the Russian Bibliological Society on Moscow courses in library science for publication.

== Move to Lublin ==
In November 1922, Lisowski returned to Poland and settled in Lublin, where he was given the post of contract archivist at the State Archive in Lublin in the company of Stanisław Ptaszycki.

On 1 July 1924, he was appointed as a full-time archivist of the same archive. He worked there until the end of 1927, during that time he was appointed several times as a scientific expert to the Special Mixed Commission in St. Petersburg to receive old prints seized and taken out of the former Polish–Lithuanian Commonwealth, subject to revindication under the Treaty of Riga.

As part of these works, he compiled, among other pieces, a list of incunabula (more than 4,500) from Polish monasteries and he wrote a series of exhaustive papers on the cultural significance of Polish monasteries, Aldines and Elzevirs of Polish provenance in the St. Petersburg collections, and the collecting passion of Józef Andrzej Załuski.

== Return to Vilnius ==
On 1 January 1928, he was appointed as the head of the department of old prints and manuscripts of the University and Public Library of the Stefan Batory University in Vilnius. He worked there until the library was handed over to the Lithuanians in the aftermath of the Soviet–Lithuanian Mutual Assistance Treaty (15 December 1939). On 15 January 1940, he was appointed to the post of a bibliographer, where he remained until 15 April 1945, when he returned to Poland.

During his stay in Vilnius, he organised and systematised the department of old prints and developed the catalogue of incunabula. At the same time, he served as deputy director.

== Publications ==
In 1915, the Academy of Sciences in St. Petersburg published his bibliographical work Pol'skaâ literatura, istorììâ i drevnosti v 1912-1913 gg. Biblìografììâ. A year later, he edited and published Polski Kalendarz Piotrogrodzki na rok przestępny 1916. Rocznik ilustrowany informacyjno-historyczno-literacki (praca zbiorowa tych, których los rzucił nad Newę) [The Polish Petrograd Calendar for the Leap Year 1916. An Illustrated Informative-Historical-Literary Yearbook (a collective work of those whose fate threw them over the Neva river)] published by Wacław Zgoda.

His more important publications include Uniwersytecka Biblioteka Publiczna za czasów rosyjskich [University Public Library during the Russian times] (Vilnius 1932), Uniwersytecka Biblioteka Publiczna w Wilnie w latach 1919-1929 [University Public Library in Vilnius in 1919-1929] (Vilnius 1931), Starodruki Biblioteki Uniwersyteckiej [Old Prints of the University Library] (Vilnius 1932), O losach ksiąg Zygmuntowych [On the Fate of Zygmunt Books] ("Vilnius. Quarterly devoted to the matters of the city of Vilnius”, 1939, r. 1, no. 2, pp. 145–152).

Lisowski was the scriptwriter and organiser of large monographic exhibitions such as: "Old prints of the University Library", "Centenary of Pan Tadeusz", "Jędrzej Śniadecki" (chemist, physician), "Gutenberg against the background of the development of printing up to the present day", "Creativity of Adam Mickiewicz", etc.

== Organisational affiliations ==
He was involved in activities of the Vilnius Circle of the Polish Librarians' Union. Initially, as a member, later as vice-president, he developed and delivered lectures on bibliology, bibliography, librarianship, and history of libraries. For his library activities and promotion of reading, at the request of Wojciech Alojzy Świętosławski, the Minister of the Ministry of Culture and Labour, Lisowski was decorated in November 1938 with the Academic Laurel.

Lisowski was a member of the Polish Bibliophile Society in Vilnius. Already in the year of his arrival at Vilnius, he was involved in the preparation of exhibits for the regional exhibition devoted to the history of the Polish book in Vilnius, organised by the Polish Bibliophile Society in Vilnius.

In April 1928, Lisowski prepared an exhibition of incunabula from the collection of the University Public Library for a meeting of the Polish Bibliophile Society in Vilnius. In May 1929, he became chairman of the Polish Bibliophile Society in Vilnius. However, he had to resign for health reasons and was replaced by Ludwik Chomiński in October 1930.

From 1933, the Polish Bibliophile Society organised lectures on book production which were led by Lisowski together with Gracjan Archemowicz. The Vilnius Circle of Polish Librarians was invited to cooperate. He was a member of, among other organisations, the Toruń Circle of the Polish Librarians and Archivists Association, the Joachim Lelewel Society of Bibliophiles in Toruń, the Adam Mickiewicz Literary Society.

In 1951–1952, he gave lectures on book science to students of the Faculty of Humanities at the Nicolaus Copernicus University and to students of courses organised by the Association of Polish Librarians and Archivists (1952/1953).

== Collection ==
Lisowski had a collection of some 5,000 volumes and nearly 3,000 Polish, German, Lithuanian and Russian ex-librises from the 17th to the 20th century. His own ex-libris was made by Gracjan Achrem Achremowicz, a graphic artist connected with Vilnius.

== Awards ==
For his merits in the scientific, bibliological and literary fields he was awarded, among other distinctions: Academic Laurel (1938) and Knight's Cross of the Order of Polonia Restituta (1958).

== Personal life ==
On 15 October 1922, in the Church of St. Catherine (the main church of the Roman Catholic community in St. Petersburg), he married Jadwiga Wolańska, daughter of a doctor. Stanisław Ptaszycki was the witness.

Lisowski died in Toruń on 5 October 1964 and was buried in the Cemetery of St. George.
