= Stanislav Sorokin =

Stanislav Sorokin may refer to:

- Stanislav Sorokin (boxer) (1941–1991), Russian boxer
- Stanislav Sorokin (footballer) (born 2000), Ukrainian football player
