= Zazerkalie (theatre) =

Coordinates: 59°55′46″N 30°20′35″E

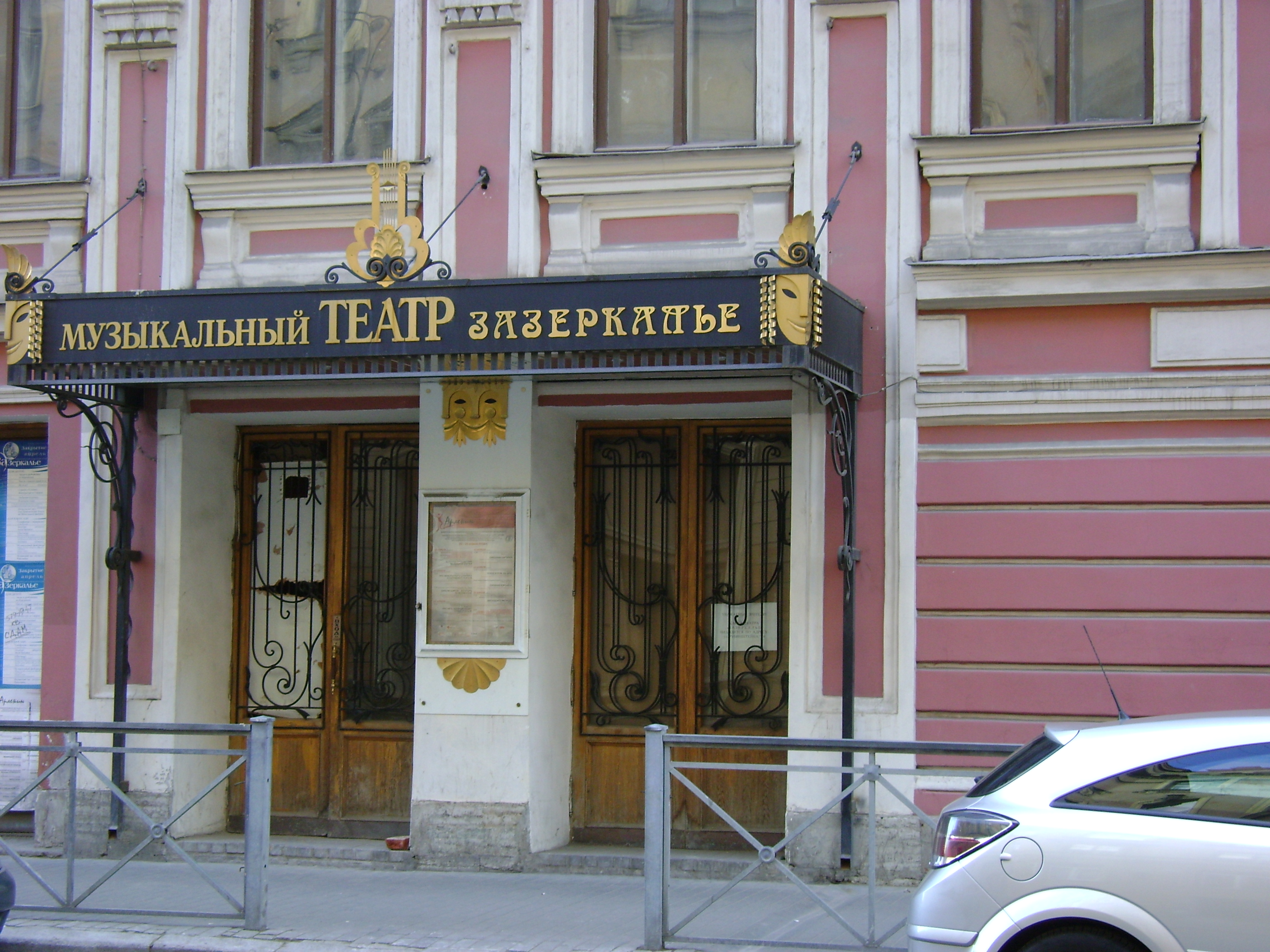
Zazerkalie Theatre

The "Looking Glass" Children's Musical Theatre (Russian: Детский музыкальный театр «Зазеркалье») is a theatre in Saint Petersburg on 13 Rubinstein Street.

== History ==
In the 1870s, the building was occupied by the Petersburg Actor's Club.

The theatre was established in August 1987 by director A.V. Petrov and conductor P.A. Bubelnikov. It's opened on 27 December 1987 with the opera of L.A. Desyatnikov "Bravo-Bravissimo, pioneer Anisimov or no one wants to sing". It was named after the Lewis Carroll's "Through the Looking-Glass".

"Zazerkalie" established the children's theatre in 1992, teaching acting skills, choreography and scenic speech as well as setting up children theatre performances.

The building in which the theater is located (the former apartment building and the assembly hall of M. F. Ruadze, later the house of A. I. Pavlova), is an architectural monument and is included in the Unified State Register of Cultural Heritage Sites (Historical and Cultural Monuments) of the Peoples of the Russian Federation as an object of cultural heritage of regional significance.

== Notable productions ==
The majority of productions draw on the repertoire of both children and adult and audiences.

== Awards ==
The performances "Love potion", "Kashtanka", "La Boheme" are marked with "Gold mask" and "Gold soffit" prizes.

== See also ==
- Through the Looking-Glass, and What Alice Found There
- Lewis Carroll
