= Stanislav Svoboda =

Stanislav Svoboda may refer to:

- Stanislav Svoboda (cyclist) (born 1930), Czech cyclist
- Stanislav Svoboda (speedway rider) (1919–1992) Czech speedway rider
