= Stanisław Pachołowiecki =

Polish Renaissance cartographer

Stanisław Pachołowiecki (Polish pronunciation: [staˈɲiswaf paˈxɔwɔvjɛtskʲi]) was a Polish Renaissance cartographer and the author of the Atlas of the Principality of Polatsk (1580).

He served in the Polish chancery as a royal secretary and cartographer during the Livonian War (1579–1582) between the Polish-Lithuanian Commonwealth and Muscovy. As a reward for his cartographical works, king Stephen Báthory ennobled Pachołowiecki in 1581. Only one of his works survived, the Atlas of the Principality of Polatsk. The maps were drawn during the Polatsk campaign in 1579. The same year, they were sent to Rome and published by Giovanni Battista Cavalieri in 1580. The Atlas consists of two large maps of the Principality of Polatsk and the siege of Polatsk in August 1579, and six smaller views of the castles captured by the royal army. This was the first Polish atlas.
