= Stanislav Rogolev =

Soviet serial killer

- Born: Stanislav Ivanovich Rogolev; 14 February 1941; Ogre district, Latvian SSR, Soviet Union
- Died: 19 June 1984 (aged 43); Leningrad, RSFSR, Soviet Union
- Cause of death: Execution by shooting
- Other names: "Agent 000" "Latvian Agent 007"
- Conviction: Murder
- Penalty: Death

Details
- Victims: 10
- Span of crimes: 1980–1982
- Country: Soviet Union

Stanislav Ivanovich Rogolev (Russian: Станислав Иванович Роголев, 14 February 1941 – 19 June 1984) was a Soviet serial killer. For one and a half years he attacked 21 women, killing 10 of them. In 1980, Rogolev was convicted four times, and charged once with rape. According to writer Alexander Chekhlov, Rogolev was the informer of Aloizs Vaznis, a police officer, who, in turn, tried to shield Rogolev. In particular, he gave Rogolev full information about the crimes, fabricating a confession in which he could be declared insane. It was also believed that Rogolev had information about the progress of the investigation. According to writer and lawyer Andris Grūtups, Rogolev was a secret agent of the deputy minister, General Anrijs Kavalieris.

The shock is still too soft a word to describe the state in which Latvia was in the early 80's. Schoolgirls went to classes in close-knit groups, husbands greeted wives from late trains, and all over the place were reinforced police detachments. In every doorway, law-abiding citizens, frightened by a man, seemed to see the worst and most bloody maniac of Latvia of the Soviet period - Stanislav Rogolev.

== Crimes ==
- His first rape, for which he was judged separately, Rogolev committed before the 1980s.
- In October 1980, Rogolev committed another sexual assault, along with his accomplice Aldis Svāre.
- On 26 October 1980, near the Jumprava station, Rogolev threatened a 17-year-old girl with a knife, dragging her into a nearby forest. When she started screaming, he beat her with the knife handle and tried to rape her, but couldn't. The girl escaped and reached her home, where her relatives lived.
- On 8 November in Salaspils, near the Dole station at seven in the morning, Rogolev twice stabbed a 44-year-old woman in the stomach because she did not want to talk to him. She survived the attack.
- On 18 November, together with Aldis Svāre, Rogolev beat and raped a woman, who managed to escape.
- On 26 November, 200 meters away from the Lielupe station, Rogolev stabbed a 27-year-old woman in the stomach, but she continued to resist. After people started approaching the scene, he fled.
- On 27 November, near the Jumprava station, Rogolev tried to attack a 24-year-old girl; she saved herself by blinding the attacker several times with a flashlight. She got off with a slight bodily injury.
- In December, he raped an 18-year-old girl 70 metres away from her house.
- On the night of the new year in Babīte, Rogolev and Svāre dragged a 34-year-old woman into the forest where they raped, robbed and murdered her.
- In March 1981 he robbed and killed a 47-year-old woman.
- On 8 April 1981, in the area of the Šķirotava station, Rogolev outlined another victim - a woman in a state of intoxication; he knocked her down, picked her up and took her to the nearest bushes, where he raped her twice and killed her afterwards.
- In July 1981, in Vecāķi, Rogolev tried to kill a man in self-defence. After deciding that the young man had died, he beat and robbed a 16-year-old girl close by.
- In late July 1981, after a joint dinner at a restaurant, Rogolev invited a 43-year-old vacationer from Chelyabinsk to his apartment, where he raped, robbed and then strangled her.
- On 27 August 1981, Rogolev was waiting at the train station when he saw a lonely 24-year-old girl who got off the train in Aizkraukle. He attacked her and inflicted about 80 blows on her. For this crime, three other men were initially charged (one of them sentenced to death), and only after Rogolev's confession were they dismissed.
- In September 1981, Rogolev made four attacks, and in March 1982, he attacked twice.
- In April 1982, after a party in the bar "Jūras pērle", Rogolev went to the beach with two girls, one of whom he killed, while the other managed to escape.

== Investigation ==
Wanted: Stanislav Ivanovich Rogolev, born in 1941. Height 180 cm, solid, athletic build, weight 100 kg; hair is dark, wavy.

To catch the maniac, a special detective group was formed. It is believed that Rogolev had information about the investigation process and because of that evaded the detective group for longer. After the murder in the "Jūras Perle" group, police experts employed an unprecedented measure: they took fingerprints from all the bottles that were on the tables that evening. And they then calculated Rogolev's fingerprints. After the criminal was put on the wanted list, his accomplice Svāre turned himself in to the Dubulti militia and suggested that Rogolev possibly resided in Ulbroka. The police, after this incident, received an informal order not to take him alive. Rogolev was detained by two young police officers, who did not know about the unofficial order. He tried to escape during the detention, but Rogolev was incapacitated by the officers and fell down on the ground. Evidence and tools from the crimes were found in his apartment. Rogolev himself willingly confessed after the detention. Psychiatric examination under the leadership of Prof. Shostakovich from the Serbsky Center recognized Rogolev as sane. The lawyer tried to appeal this decision, arguing that during the war Rogolev and his mother were bombed and buried alive, and excavated only after a few hours. All his life Rogolev had suffered from hallucinations, drank diazepam and other potent medicines, which, when paired with alcohol could cause increased aggressiveness. And in prison, he was always beaten because he was convicted of rape. Rogolev was sentenced to death and executed by firing squad in Leningrad on 19 June 1984. The case was conducted by the investigator for special cases Jānis Skrastiņš.

If you believe the police legend, after awarding him the highest measure Stanislav Rogolev behaved extremely apathetic and was completely indifferent to everything that happens around. But at the airport, when he, already sentenced, was taken to the place of execution in Leningrad, saw a beautiful girl, he suddenly enlivened and said: "If I could have one more of this - and then ... shoot."

== See also ==
- List of serial killers by country
- List of serial killers by number of victims

== Literature ==
- "Case number 1", Alexander Chekhlov, Riga, 1992, 1995.
- "Maniac" (Latvian: "Maniaks"), Andris Grutups, "Atēna", 2010

== Documentaries ==
- Documentary film "Agent 000" from the series "The investigation was conducted...", 2011.
