= Stachowiak =

Stachowiak (Polish pronunciation: [staˈxɔvjak]) is a Polish surname. Notable people include:

- Adam Stachowiak (born 1986), Polish footballer
- Adam Stachowiak (cyclist) (born 1989), Polish racing cyclist
- Clement Stachowiak (1902–1981), American politician
- Dariusz Stachowiak (born 1984), Polish footballer
- Hanna Gill-Piątek (née Stachowiak; born 1974), Polish politician
- Herbert Stachowiak (1921–2004), German philosopher
- Maciej Stachowiak (born 1976), Polish programmer
- Mirosława Stachowiak-Różecka (born 1973), Polish politician
- Wojciech Stachowiak (born 1999), Polish-German ice hockey player
