= Barbara Kazmierczak =

American female microbiologist

Academic background
- Education: Diploma, Maine South High School; B.A., University of Chicago; PhD., Rockefeller University; MD., Cornell University Medical College

Barbara Irene Kazmierczak is an American microbiologist. She is the Gustavus and Louse Pfeiffer Research Foundation MD-PhD Program Director at the Yale School of Medicine. Kazmierczak is also a professor of medicine and professor of microbial pathogenesis.

== Career ==
Kazmierczak joined the faculty at Yale School of Medicine in 2001. The next year, she was the recipient of the 2002 Donaghue Investigator Program award from the Donaghue Medical Research Foundation for her research on how human cells respond to disease-causing bacteria.

In 2014, she was named Director at the Yale Medical Scientist Training Program, replacing James D. Jamieson. By 2019, Kazmierczak was appointed to the Gustavus and Louise Pfeiffer Research Foundation M.D.-Ph.D. Program Director endowed professorship. She was also elected a fellow of the American Academy of Microbiology and named president of the National Association of MD-PhD Programs and chair of the AAMC's GREAT Group MD-PhD Steering Committee.
