= Stanislav Feoktistov =

Russian footballer

Personal information
- Full name: Stanislav Aleksandrovich Feoktistov
- Date of birth: 14 January 1965 (age 61)
- Height: 1.73 m (5 ft 8 in)
- Positions: Defender; midfielder; striker

Youth career
- DYuSSh-8 Gorky

Senior career*
Years	Team	Apps	(Gls)
1981–1982	FC Dynamo Kirov		
1983–1991	FC Geolog Tyumen	279	(51)
1992–1995	FC Lokomotiv Nizhny Novgorod	87	(4)
1996	FC Irtysh Tobolsk	2	(0)
1996–1997	FC Lokomotiv Nizhny Novgorod	0	(0)
1996–1997	→ FC Lokomotiv-d Nizhny Novgorod	45	(0)
1998–2001	FC Lokomotiv-d Nizhny Novgorod (amateur)		
2001	FC Lokomotiv Nizhny Novgorod	0	(0)

Managerial career
- 2001: FC Lokomotiv Nizhny Novgorod (caretaker)
- 2001: FC Lokomotiv Nizhny Novgorod (director)
- * Club domestic league appearances and goals

Stanislav Aleksandrovich Feoktistov (Russian: Станислав Александрович Феоктистов; born 14 January 1965) is a former Russian professional footballer.

== Club career ==
He made his professional debut in the Soviet Second League in 1983 for FC Geolog Tyumen.
