= Stanisław Tomkiewicz =

Polish journalist, farmer, and politician (1945–2022)

Member of the Sejm
- In office 18 June 1989 – 25 November 1991

Personal details
- Born: 10 October 1945 Przyborów, Poland
- Died: 2 May 2022 (aged 76)
- Party: KO "S"
- Education: University of Wrocław
- Occupation: Journalist; Farmer

Stanisław Tomkiewicz (10 October 1945 – 2 May 2022) was a Polish journalist, farmer, and politician. A member of the Solidarity Citizens' Committee, he served in the Sejm from 1989 to 1991. He died on 2 May 2022 at the age of 76.
