= Stanisław Kaźmierczak =

Stanisław Kaźmierczak can refer to:

- Stanisław Kaźmierczak (footballer)
- Stanisław Kaźmierczak (field hockey)
