= Estanislao (name) =

Estanislao is a male given name and occasional surname, the Spanish version of the Slavic name Stanislav. Notable people with the name include:

== Given name ==
- Cucunuchi, baptized Estanislao (c. 1798–1838), Lakisamni leader of Mission San José, Northern California
- Estanislao Argote (born 1956), Spanish former footballer
- Estanislao Artal (1912–1967), Spanish swimmer
- Estanislao Basora (1926–2012), Spanish footballer
- Estanislao de Grandes (1947–2022), Spanish diplomat
- Estanislao del Campo (1834–1880), Argentine poet
- Estanislao del Canto (1840–1923), Chilean military officer
- Estanislao Fernandez (1910–1982), Filipino judge, Associate Justice of the Supreme Court of the Philippines
- Estanislao Figueras (1819–1882), Spanish politician
- Estanislao Goya (born 1988), Argentine golfer
- Estanislao Esteban Karlic (1926–2025), Argentine Roman Catholic cardinal
- Estanislao Kocourek (born 1930), Argentine hurdler
- Estanislao López (1786–1838), Argentine caudillo
- Estanislao Lynch (1793–1849), Argentine military officer and businessman
- Estanislao Medina Huesca (born 1990), Equatorial Guinean author
- Estanislao Oziewicz (born 1952), Canadian journalist
- Estanisláo Przewodowski (22 October 1843 – 25 August 1903), Brazilian military officer and engineer
- Estanislao Rodríguez-Ponga, Spanish economist
- Estanislao Shilinsky (1911–1985), Lithuanian-born Mexican comedian
- Estanislao Struway (born 1968), Paraguayan football coach and former player
- Estanislao Tovilla Cortázar (1936–1994), Mexican engineer
- Estanislao Valdés Otero (born 1931), Uruguayan lawyer, author and politician
- Estanislao Vergara (1790–1855), Colombian lawyer and politician
- Estanislao Zeballos (1854–1923), Argentine lawyer and politician
- Estanislao Zuleta (1935–1990), Colombian philosopher, author and academic
- Miguel Estanislao Soler (1783–1849), Argentine military officer
- Ricardo Estanislao Zulueta (born 1962) Cuban-American artist, scholar and author

== Surname ==
- Abel Estanislao (born 1995), Filipino actor and model
- Jesus Estanislao, Filipino economist

== See also ==
- Estanislao (disambiguation)
- Estanislau, the Catalan and Portuguese version of the name
- Stanislao, the Italian version of the name
