= St. Michael's College School =

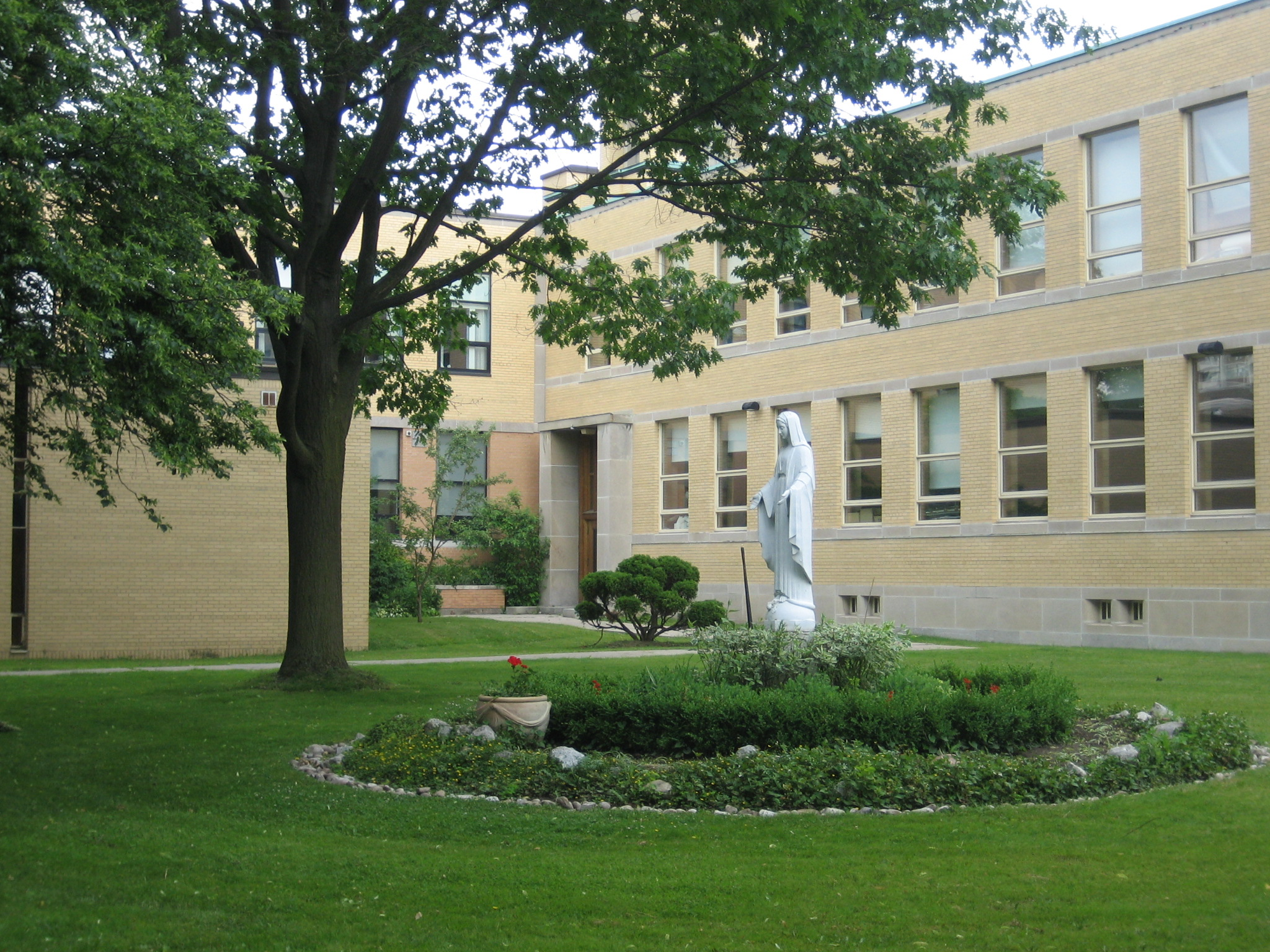

Location
- 1515 Bathurst Street; Toronto, Ontario, M5P 3H4; Canada; 43°41′04″N 79°25′03″W

Information
- Type: Private secondary school; Private primary school
- Motto: Latin: Doce me Bonitatem et Disciplinam et Scientiam
- Religious affiliation: Christian
- Denomination: Catholic
- Opened: September 1852; 174 years ago
- School board: Conference of Independent Schools of Ontario; Metropolitan Separate School Board (1967–1985)
- President: Fr. Andrew Leung, CSB
- Principal: Mr. Phil Wilson
- VP of Mission & Spirituality: Fr. William May, CSB
- Faculty: 70
- Grades: 7 to 12
- Enrolment: 850
- Language: English
- Campus: Urban, 11 acres (4.5 ha)
- Colours: Light blue, navy
- Athletics conference: Conference of Independent Schools of Ontario Athletic Association
- School fees: $26,400 to 33,200 per year
- Revenue: $32,264,487 (2024)
- Graduates (2026): 136
- Total assets: $159,399,777
- Website: stmichaelscollegeschool.com

St. Michael's College School (also known as St. Michael's, St. Mike's, and SMCS), is an all-boys Catholic private school in Toronto, Ontario, Canada. Administered by the Congregation of St. Basil, it is the largest school of its kind in Canada, with an enrolment of approximately 850 students from grades 7 to 12. It is known for its high standard of academics and athletics, notably its ice hockey, football and basketball programs. The hockey program has graduated numerous future National Hockey League ice hockey players. The basketball and football programs have graduated multiple NBA, NFL, and CFL players. St. Michael's College School previously served as the affiliate school of Holy Name of Mary College School, an independent, Catholic all-girls school in Mississauga. St. Michael's was part of the Metropolitan Separate School Board from 1967 to 1985, but has subsequently operated within the Conference of Independent Schools of Ontario.

== History ==
The Congregation of St. Basil (Basilian Fathers) was established as a religious congregation in France in 1822. As a result of the closing of seminaries in France during the French Revolution, two diocesan priests opened a secret school in the mountains of central France.

After several years of operation and a change in the French laws, ten priests serving there openly bound themselves into a religious community. They reasoned that the school, by then located in the nearby city of Annonay, would have a better chance of continuing if it were conducted by a religious congregation that could accept and train new members to continue its operation after the founding fathers' retirement.

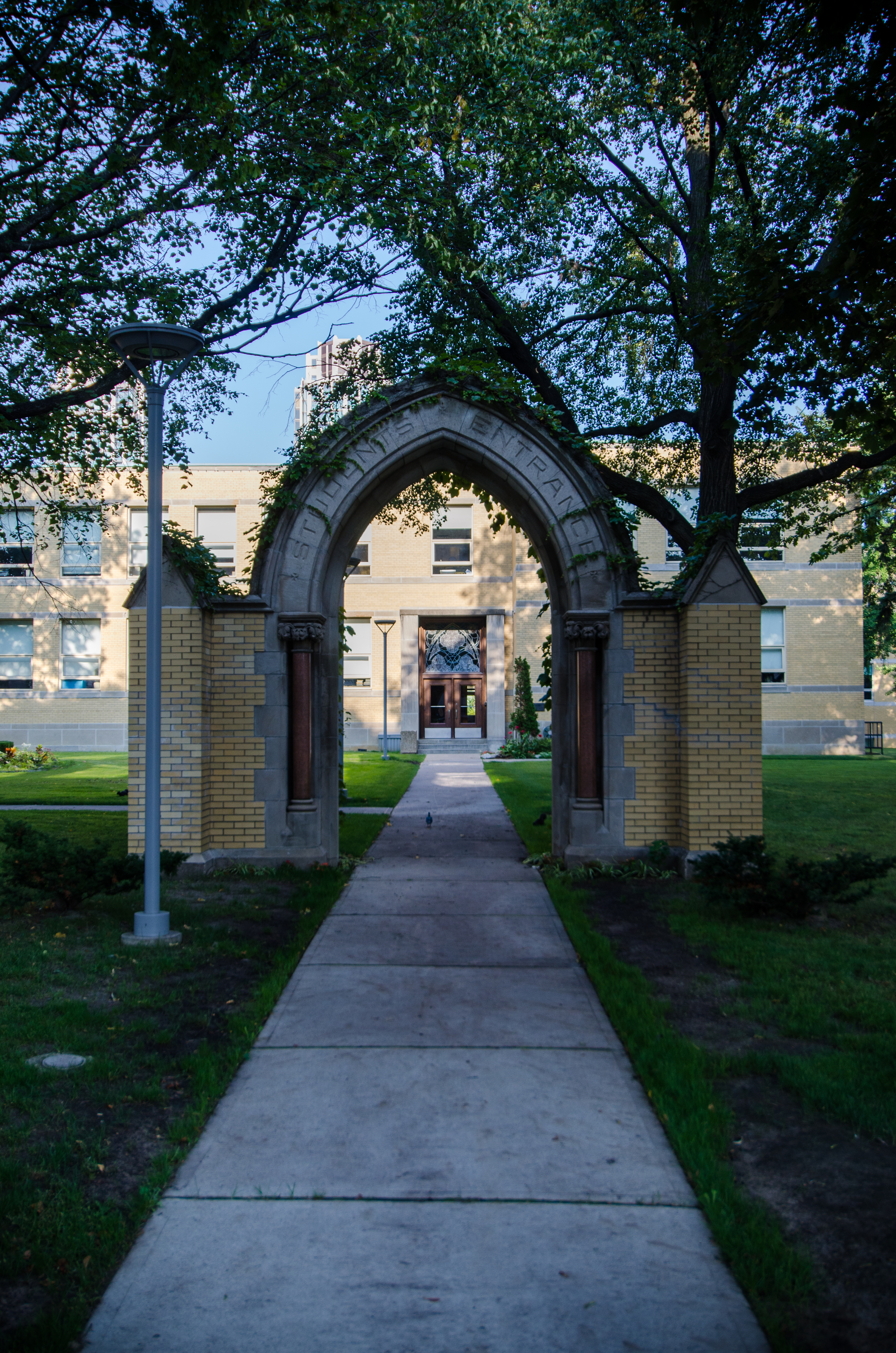
The Archway

The original members chose St. Basil the Great, a fourth-century teacher, bishop, and doctor of the Church, to be the namesake of the new community.

In the middle of the nineteenth century, the French Basilians came to Canada on an invitation from Bishop Armand-François-Marie de Charbonnel of Toronto. The Bishop saw the need for Catholic schools for the young people of his parishes, especially at the high school level. In his plans to bring Catholic education to more of his people, the Bishop immediately thought of his own education in France. He had been educated at the College of Annonay near Lyon, a school established by the Basilian Fathers.

In September 1852, St. Michael's College School opened. It quickly outgrew its original facilities in the basement of the Bishop's Palace on Church Street. In 1856, it moved to Clover Hill, a property donated to the Basilian Fathers by John Elmsley. Clover Hill was outside the city at that time, in an area now bounded by Bay, St. Joseph, and St. Mary's streets. In 1881, St. Michael's was affiliated with St. Michael's College at the University of Toronto for post secondary education.

The school specifically targeted Irish immigrants. The high school section expanded much more rapidly than the college section. In 1902, a new wing was added to the original building and the high school remained here until 1950.

In the years after World War II, it became apparent that the Bay Street buildings were not equal to the challenge of serving a growing student body. At this point the high school section was separated from the University College. In September 1950, St. Michael's College School opened its doors at Bathurst Street and St. Clair Avenue, where it is situated today.

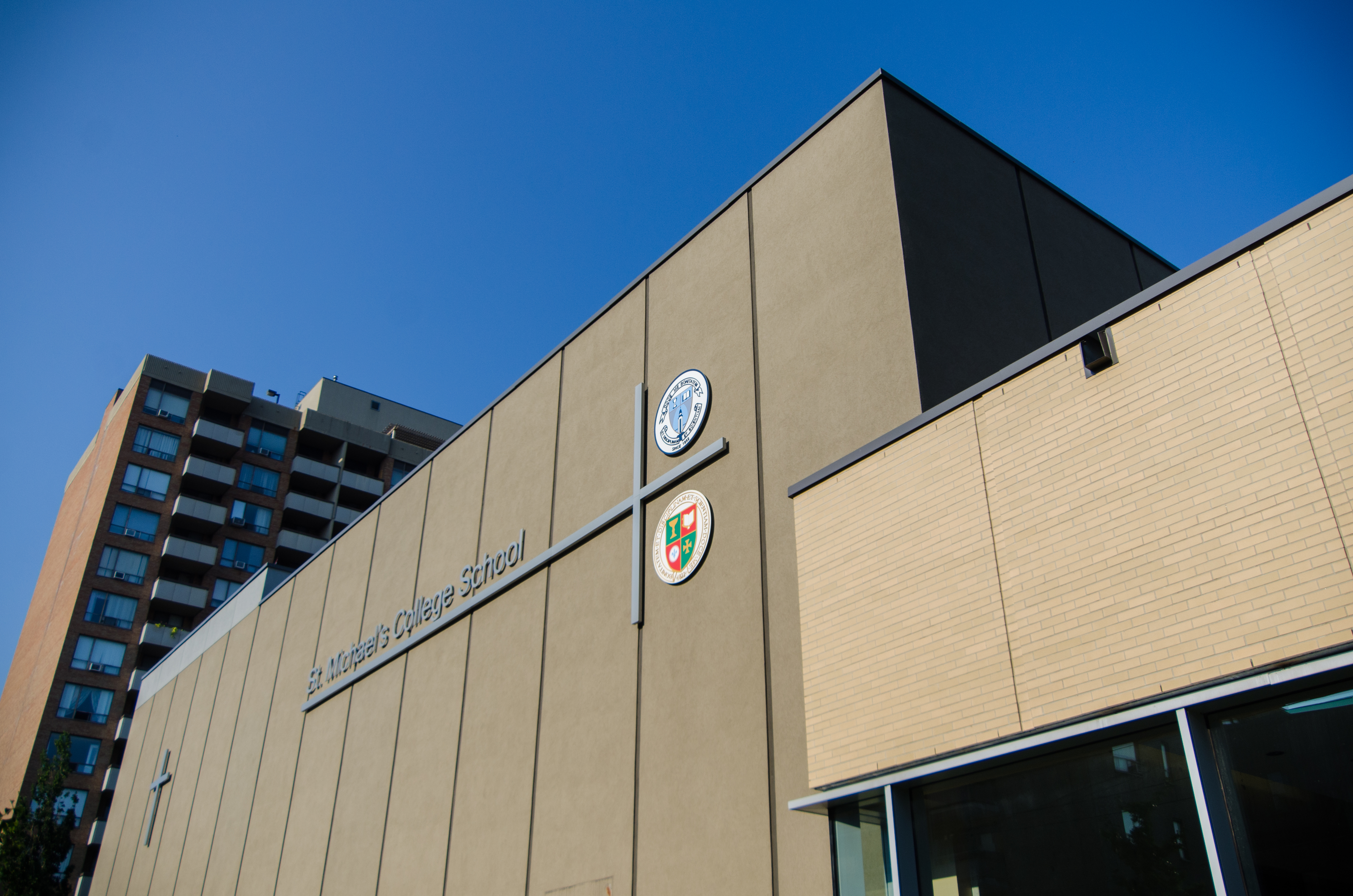
St. Michael's College School

In 1967, St. Michael's College School entered into partnership with the Metropolitan Separate School Board (known today as the Toronto Catholic District School Board) educating the Board's students in Grades 9 and 10. This decision made St. Michael's College School both a public and private school, which lasted for approximately 20 years. In September 1985, the Basilian Fathers decided to refuse provincial aid beyond and return St. Michael's to its roots as an independent, Catholic high school.

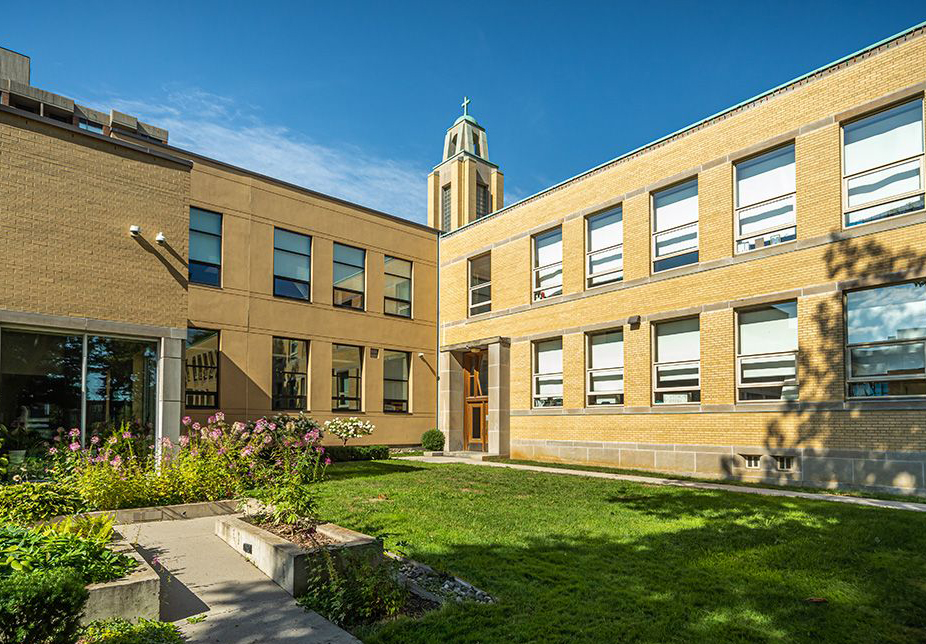
SMCS Tower

In 1995, a major capital expansion program upgraded the school to include an east wing complete with science classrooms, a library (Odette Library), music and visual arts facilities, a design and technology facility, a 250-seat lecture hall, and an expanded gymnasium. In September 1998, St. Michael's College School expanded its academic program to include a Grade 7 and 8 program. The Preparatory school was previously active during the early 1900s.

The school's athletic stadium was retrofitted in September 2004 to include a state-of-the-art athletic field complete with artificial turf, an electronic scoreboard, stadium lighting, and an air supported dome that covers a third of the field for use during the winter months. The St. Michael's College School Centre for the Arts was the fourth and final phase of this revitalization project. The St. Michael's College School Centre for the Arts opened in April 2010, and hosts annual school stage productions of musicals and dramas in addition to concerts and other events.

== Campus ==
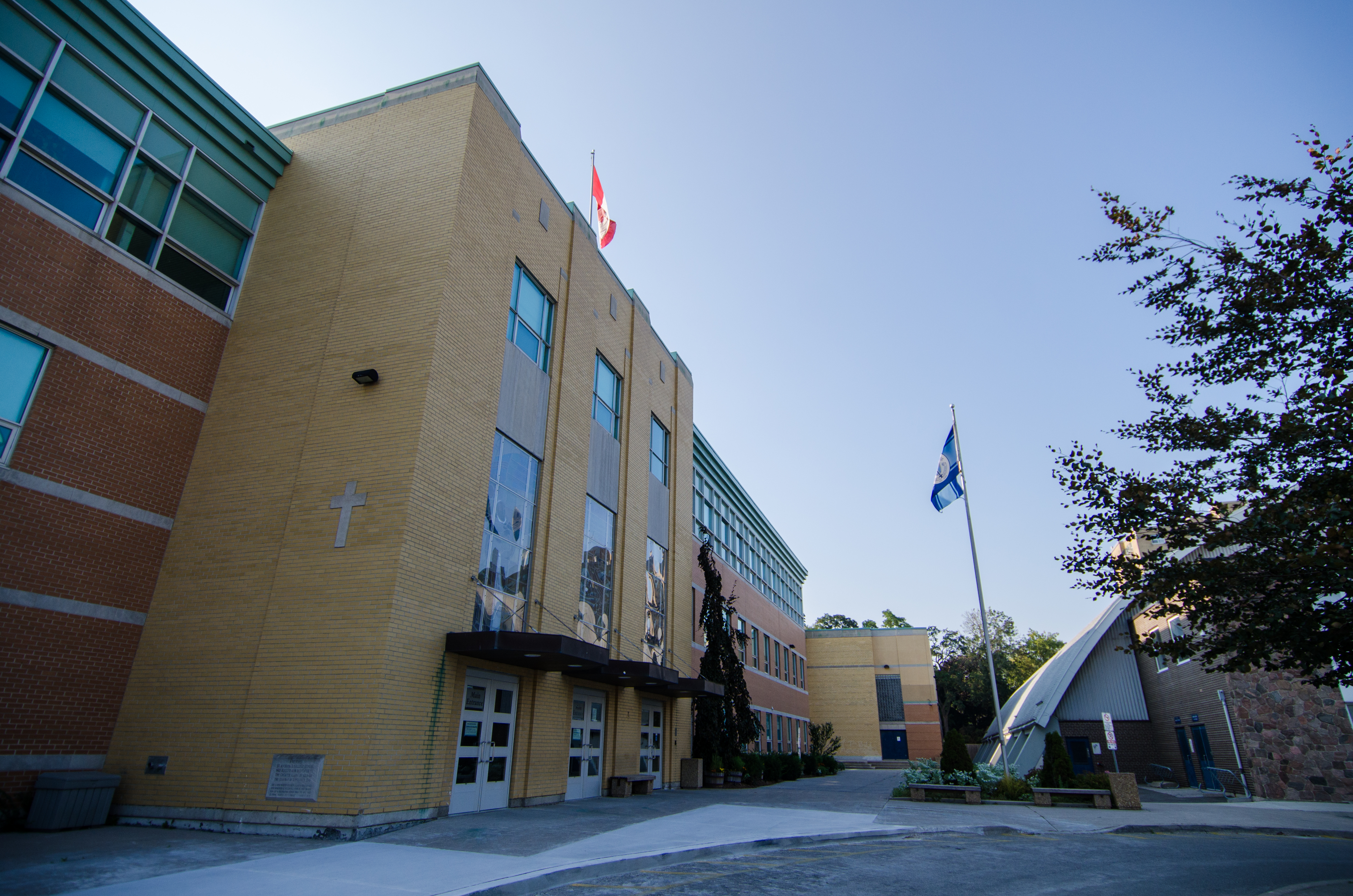
St. Michael's College School

The school's campus is located at Bathurst Street and St. Clair Avenue at the edge of Toronto's Forest Hill neighbourhood. The main school building was designed by Canadian architect Ernest Cormier and completed in 1950. Its most recognizable features are the distinctive chapel tower and yellow brickwork, similar to Cormier's earlier work at the Université de Montréal.

In the late 1990s, a major expansion programme was undertaken, with two major academic wings and a gymnasium extension added to the original building. The additions contain classrooms tailored to the science, art and music programmes, a substantial lecture hall, several computer laboratories, and a large library. An outdoor courtyard adjacent to the cafeteria overlooked by classrooms is popular for major school events. The school's residence wing, originally built to accommodate boarding students, functioned as a Basilian house until 2008 when it was removed to make room for the school's "state-of-the-art" Centre for the Arts. The $10 million facility was completed in the April 2010.

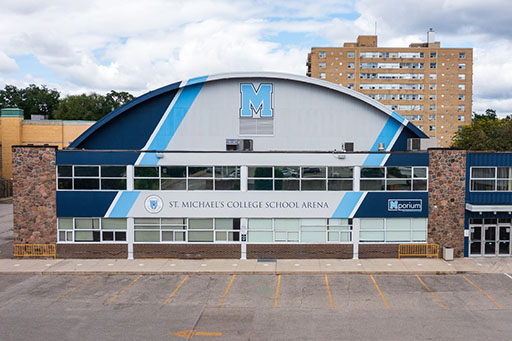
The outside of St. Michael's College School Arena

There are a number of sports facilities located on campus, including the St. Michael's College School Arena. The school's basketball court is named after former vice-principal, teacher, coach, and alumnus Paul Dignan. In 2005, a major overhaul of the stadium was undertaken. Renamed in honour of its benefactor, billionaire alumnus Eugene Melnyk, it features an artificial turf field, a rubberized running track, and lighting for evening events. During the winter, an air supported dome covers part of the field to allow for use year-round.

== Athletics ==
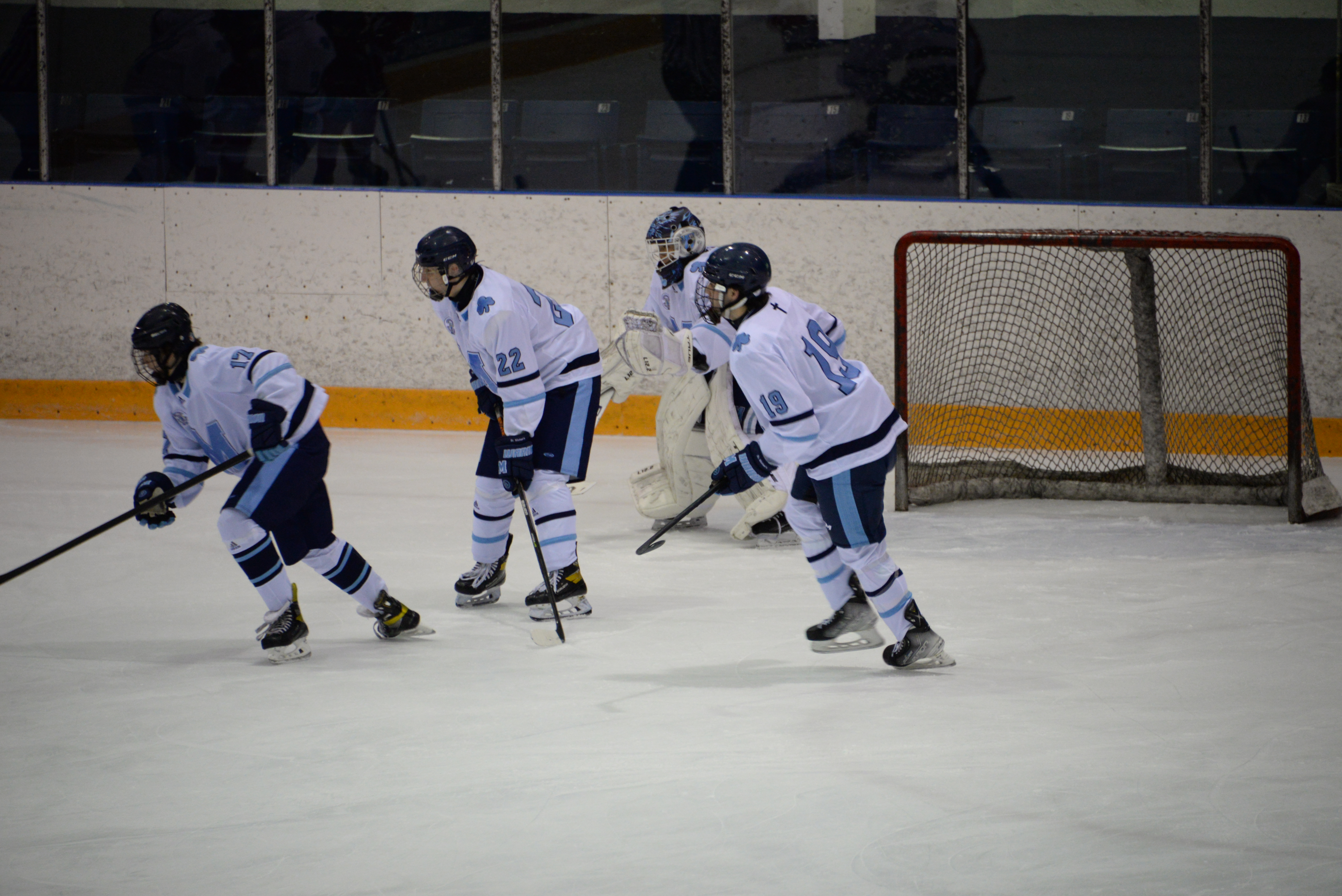
St. Michael's Majors Sr. Hockey Team in action.

Over 90 St. Michael's Majors alumni have played in the National Hockey League. From the Majors, there are twelve Hockey Hall of Fame inductees: Bobby Bauer, Turk Broda, Gerry Cheevers, Dick Duff, Tim Horton, Red Kelly, Dave Keon, Ted Lindsay, Frank Mahovlich, Joe Primeau, Murray Costello, and Jim Gregory. Additionally, Hall of Famer Reg Noble played for St. Michael's before the team adopted the Majors name.

The school's flagship hockey team, the Toronto St. Michael's Majors, won the Memorial Cup four times before ceasing operation in 1961. The Majors name was revived as an expansion franchise in the Ontario Hockey League from 1996 to 2012, then sold off to become the Mississauga Steelheads. The school also operates the St. Michael's Buzzers, at the Tier II Junior "A" level. The school was featured on CBC's annual Hockey Day in Canada on 13 January 2007, as the College School was celebrating 100 years of hockey. The junior and senior football teams are called the Kerry Blues. The Jr. Kerry Blues won their third Ontario Regional Invitational in 2008 (having previously won in 2002 and 2004) In 2008, the Senior Kerry Blues won their seventh Metro Bowl, making the St. Michael's Kerry Blues the most bowl-winning team in Ontario. They have won the Metro Bowl three years in a row. There have been many Kerry Blues Football alumni that have gone on to win the CIAU National Football Championship with their respective universities. The 1993 Vanier Cup Champion University of Toronto Varsity Blues had several SMCS Alumni: Christopher Tyndorf, Lou Tiro and Peter Woo. National Football League players Glen Young, O.J. Santiago and Mike Labinjo, each of whom have competed in the Super Bowl, played football while attending St. Michael's.

The school competes in the Basil Bowl against other Basilian high schools.

== Bullying and sex crimes ==
In November 2018, police began an investigation after learning of two separate sexual assaults at the school, which suspended and expelled a number of students. arresting 6 students and with principal Greg Reeves and school president Father Jefferson Thompson resigning the same month. An August 2019 review found that bullying was a "systemic issue" at the school, albeit similar to other comparable schools across Canada. On 3 October 2019, three of the seven students charged pleaded guilty to charges of sexual assault with a weapon and assault with a weapon; one of the three also pleading guilty to making child pornography for filming one of the sexual assaults. In December 2019, Ontario Court Justice Brian Weagant sentenced the three students to 2 years' probation, saying that "the teens had been affected by a normalized bullying culture at the school" and that the school culture normalized bullying and sexual bullying, which Weagant described as being supported by the sweeping culture review conducted by the school in the wake of the criminal charges. One of the two victims of the October 2018 incidents went on to file a C$1.65 million lawsuit against the school, its board, 3 former students, the Basilian Fathers, some coaches and some administrators. One student charged in relation to the attacks filed a C$1m case against Toronto Police stating that he had been a victim and was wrongfully charged.

In 2020, it was revealed that former principal Father Leo Campbell had been known to have "psycho-sexual tendencies" by the Basilian Fathers before his time at St. Michael's. Campbell was diagnosed with ephebophilia at Southdown Treatment Centre, an Ontario centre for Catholic clergy, including those accused of sexual abuse, and it was concluded that he should have no unsupervised contact with early teenage boys.

== Notable faculty ==
- Greg Wojt, former CFL player; St. Michael's coach
- David Bauer, founder of the Canada men's national ice hockey team, inductee into the Hockey Hall of Fame
- Michael Colle, Ontario Minister of Citizenship and Immigration
- Michael W. Higgins, president of St. Thomas University; former president of St. Jerome's University
- Michael McGowan, English teacher; director of the film Saint Ralph
- Robert Kasun, Catholic auxiliary bishop of the Archdiocese of Toronto

== Notable alumni ==
=== Academia ===
- Robert J. Birgeneau, physicist and administrator
- Gregory Kealey, historian
- Joseph Pivato, literary scholar
- David Staines, English professor

=== Athletes ===
==== NHL players ====
- Bobby Bauer (HHOF)
- Turk Broda (HHOF)
- Gerry Cheevers (HHOF)
- Andrew Cogliano
- Les Costello
- Murray Costello (HHOF)
- Bill Dineen, coach
- Dick Duff (HHOF)
- Paul Gardner, coach
- Luke Gazdic
- Tim Horton, Tim Hortons co-founder (HHOF)
- Red Kelly, coach; later also a politician (HHOF)
- Dave Keon (HHOF)
- Michael Liambas
- Brett Lindros
- Eric Lindros (HHOF)
- Ted Lindsay (HHOF)
- Frank Mahovlich, Canadian senator (HHOF)
- Peter Mahovlich
- Cesare Maniago
- Craig Mills
- Dominic Moore
- Steve Moore
- Reg Noble (HHOF)
- Joe Primeau (HHOF)
- Jason Spezza
- Tyler Seguin
- Chris Tanev
- John Jakopin
- Matthew Halischuk
- Jake Evans
- Quinn Hughes
- Akil Thomas
- Jamie Drysdale

(HHOF) denotes Hockey Hall of Fame Inductee

==== NFL players ====
- Mike Labinjo
- O.J. Santiago
- Glen Young

==== CFL players ====
- Nolan MacMillan
- Chris Smith
- Derek Wiggan
- Glen Young
- Kaion Julien-Grant
- Gordon Whyte

==== NBA players ====
- Leo Rautins, player, coach, broadcaster

==== Other athletes ====
- Danilo Djuricic, college basketball player
- Marcus Carr, basketball player in the Israeli Basketball Premier League
- Derek Holmes, amateur and Olympic ice hockey player and coach
- Justyn Knight, cross country runner
- Duane Notice, professional basketball player

=== Business ===
- Robert Deluce, founder, Porter Airlines
- Sergio Marchionne, chairman of CNH Industrial, CEO of Fiat Chrysler Automobiles, chairman and CEO of FCA US LLC, chairman and CEO of Ferrari, and the chairman of Maserati
- Eugene Melnyk, billionaire, owner of the Ottawa Senators
- Frank Buckley, president of Buckley's cough syrup
- Anthony Di Iorio, billionaire, co-founder of Ethereum
- Tim Horton, founder of Tim Horton's
- Patrick Dovigi, billionaire, founder and CEO of GFL Environmental

=== Media ===
- Mikey Bustos, entertainer; finalist, Canadian Idol
- Jesse Carere, actor
- Sergio Di Zio, actor
- Michael Enright (honorary diploma recipient), host, CBC Radio
- Anthony Oliveira, writer
- Michael Ontkean, actor
- Estanislao Oziewicz, journalist, The Globe and Mail

=== Politics ===
- William R. Allen, chairman of Metropolitan Toronto
- Patrick Brown, Mayor of Brampton; former MPP; former Ontario Leader of the Official Opposition (PCC)
- Josh Colle, Toronto City Councillor; Toronto Transit Commission
- Michael Colle, Toronto city councillor; former Minister of Citizenship and Immigration
- Stephen Lecce, King—Vaughan MPP, Ontario Minister of Education
- Joe Mihevc, Toronto city councillor
- Jaggi Singh, anarchist; activist
- Michael Tibollo, Vaughan—Woodbridge MPP

=== Law enforcement ===
- Myron Demkiw, chief of police of the Toronto Police Service

== See also ==
- Education in Ontario
- Conference of Independent Schools of Ontario Athletic Association
- List of secondary schools in Ontario
