= Stanislao =

Stanislao is a male given name, the Italian version of the Slavic name Stanislav. Notable people with the name include:

== First name ==
- Stanislao Campana (1794–1864), Italian painter
- Stanislao Cannizzaro (1826–1910), Italian chemist
- Stanislao Caraciotti (1897–1943), Italian admiral during World War II
- Stanislao Di Chiara (1891–1973), Italian gymnast
- Stanislao Gastaldon (1861–1939), Italian composer
- Stanislao Lepri (1905–1980), Italian surrealist painter
- Stanislao Lista (1824–1908), Italian sculptor
- Stanislao Loffreda (1932–2025), Italian Franciscan friar and archaeologist
- Stanislao Marino (1951-present), Italian born Venezuelan christian singer.
- Stanislao Mattei (1750–1825), Italian composer, musicologist, and music teacher
- Stanislao Mocenni (1837–1907), Italian military officer and politician
- Stanislao Nievo (1928–2006), Italian writer, journalist and director

== Middle name ==
- Francesco Giuseppe Carlo Ambrogio Stanislao d'Asburgo-Este (1779–1846), Duke of Modena
- Giuseppe Paolo Stanislao Occhialini (1907–1993), Italian physicist
- Pasquale Stanislao Mancini (1817–1888), Italian jurist and statesman

== See also ==
- Steve DiStanislao (born 1963), American drummer
- Il Finto Stanislao, an operatic melodramma giocoso by Giuseppe Verdi
- San Stanislao Kostka, a Roman Catholic parish church in Palermo, Italy
- Santo Stanislao dei Polacchi, a Roman Catholic church in Rome, Italy
- Estanislao, the Spanish version of the name
- Estanislau, the Catalan and Portuguese version of the name
