= Italian frigate Carlo Bergamini (F 590) =

FREMM class multi-purpose frigates in the Italian Navy

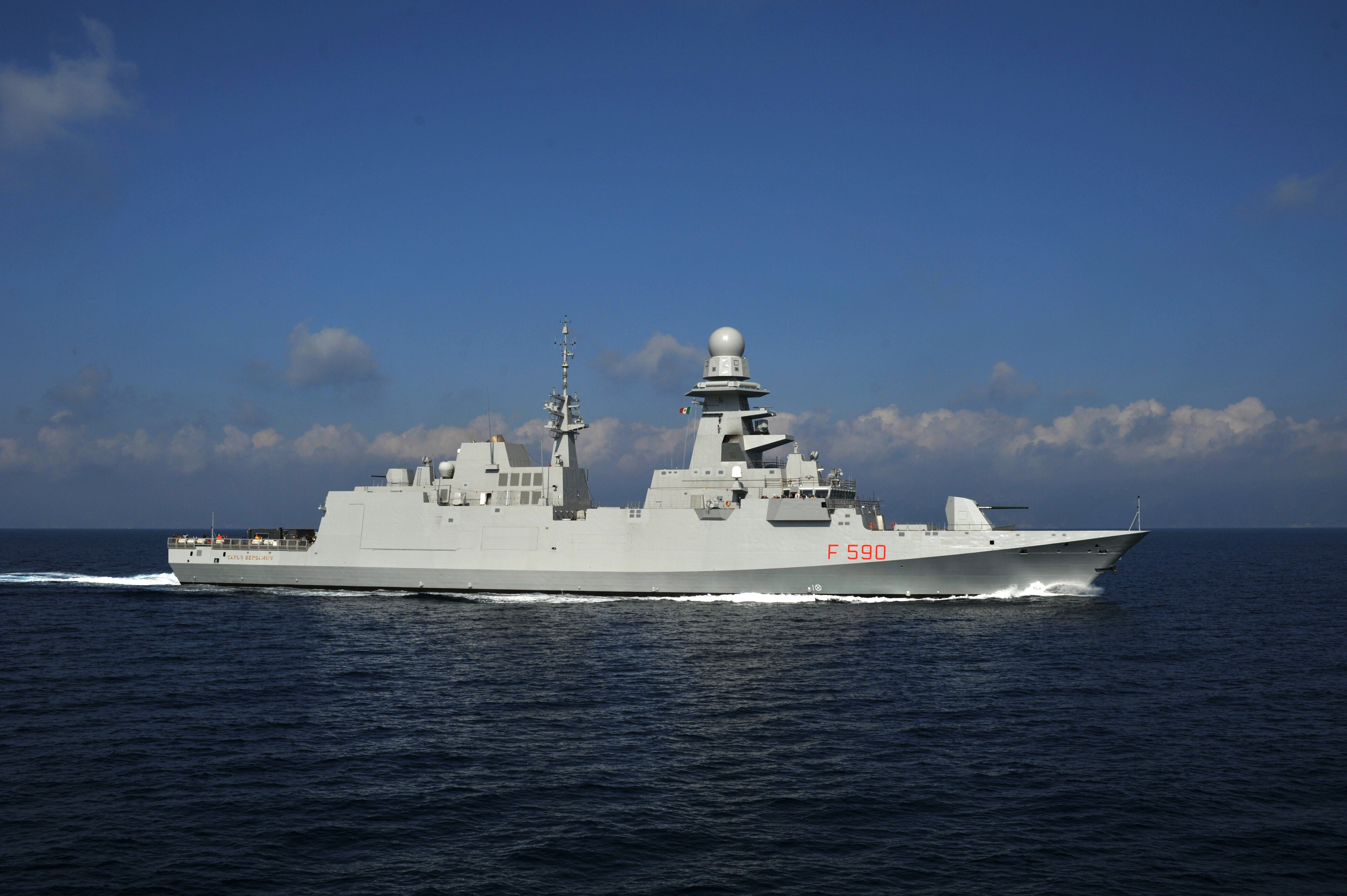
- Carlo Bergamini on 6 October 2011

History

Italy
- Name: Carlo Bergamini
- Namesake: Carlo Bergamini
- Builder: Fincantieri, Riva Trigoso and Muggiano
- Laid down: 4 February 2008
- Launched: 16 July 2011
- Commissioned: 29 May 2013
- Home port: Taranto
- Identification: MMSI number: 247321100; Callsign: IAOA; Pennant number: F 590
- Motto: Con forza e fedeltà; (With strength and fidelity)
- Status: Active

General characteristics
- Class & type: Carlo Bergamini-class frigate
- Displacement: 6,700 tons
- Length: 144.6 m (474.4 ft)
- Beam: 19.7 m (64.6 ft)
- Draught: 8.7 m (28.5 ft)
- Propulsion: CODLAG; 1 × 32 MW gas turbine General Electric/Avio LM2500+G4; 2 × 2.5 MW electric motors Jeumont Electric; 4 × diesel generators; VL 1716 (T2ME series by 2,15 MW each, on first two frigate; HPCR series by 2,8 MW each, since the third frigate); 2 × shafts, driving controllable pitch propellers; 1 × 1 MW bow thruster
- Speed: 27 knots (50 km/h; 31 mph); max cruise speed 15.6 knots (28.9 km/h; 18.0 mph)
- Range: 6,800 nmi (12,600 km; 7,800 mi) at 15 knots (28 km/h; 17 mph)
- Complement: 199
- Sensors & processing systems: Leonardo Kronos Grand Naval (MFRA) Active electronically scanned array radar; CAPTAS-4 towed-array sonar; UMS 4110 CL hull-mounted sonar
- Armament: 16-cell MBDA SYLVER A50 VLS for 16 MBDA Aster 15 and 30 missiles; 1 × Leonardo Otobreda 127/64 Vulcano; 1 × Leonardo OTO Melara 76/62 mm Davide/Strales CIWS gun; 2 × Leonardo Oto Melara/Oerlikon KBA 25/80 mm remote weapon systems; 8 × MBDA Teseo\Otomat Mk-2/A anti-ship and land attack missiles; 2 x triple Leonardo (WASS) B-515/3 launcher for MU 90 torpedoes; 2 x SITEP MASS CS-424 acoustic guns
- Aircraft carried: 2 × SH90; 1 × SH90; 1 × AW101 (armed with MU 90 torpedoes or MBDA Marte Mk2/S missiles)
- Aviation facilities: Double hangar

Carlo Bergamini (F 590) is the lead ship of the Carlo Bergamini-class frigate of the Italian Navy, developed from the FREMM multipurpose frigate program.

== Development and design ==
Planning assumptions for the Italian Navy are 10 FREMM-IT (4 ASW variants and 6 GP variants) at a cost of €5.9 billion. FREMM-IT will replace the Maestrale and Lupo-class frigates in service with the Italian Navy. In the 2013 Italian budget, the Italian government laid out the necessary financing for two more GP variants (FREMM-IT 7 & 8) and the contract was awarded in September 2013. On 15 April 2015, the Italian Parliament confirmed the deal between OCCAR and Orizzonte Sistemi Navali Spa (Fincantieri and Finmeccanica, since 2017 Leonardo) to begin building units 9 and 10, for 764 million Euros.

As of 16 April 2015, the Italian government has approved funding for all ten FREMM-IT to be delivered to the Italian Navy (4 ASW variants and 6 GP variants).

FREMM-IT 9 and 10 will have undisclosed enhanced capabilities. All 10 Italian FREMM-ITs have extended AAW capabilities, with SAAM-ESD CMS, Aster 30 and Aster 15 missiles for extended area defence. SAAM-ESD CMS use Leonardo MFRA, a 3D active radar (AESA), an evolved version of the Leonardo EMPAR PESA radar (previously embarked on Horizon-class destroyers and the aircraft carrier Cavour). Since the 7th FREMM-IT, there will be updates, such as new conformal IFF antenna and much more stealth response. Since the 9th FREMM-IT, SCLAR-H replaced with Leonardo ODLS-20. In 2017 the Italian FREMM refit started with the installation on each of 2 SITEP MS-424 acoustic guns.

In 2020 it was reported that Italy would sell its last two FREMM-class frigates in the current production line (Spartaco Schergat and Emilio Bianchi) to Egypt. Spartaco Schergat was in the final stage of her sea trials while Emilio Bianchi would follow within one year. The deal reportedly also involved other military equipment and was worth 1.2 billion Euros. It was reported that Italy would then order two additional FREMM frigates to replace those transferred to Egypt with the anticipated delivery of the replacements by 2024.

== Construction and career ==
On 16 July 2011, the launching ceremony of the ship took place at the Fincantieri plants in Riva Trigoso, in the presence of the Chief of Defense, General Biagio Abrate, of the Chief of Staff of the Navy team admiral Bruno Branciforte, and the CEO of Fincantieri Giuseppe Bono. The ship christening was conducted by Maria Bergamini Loedler, granddaughter of Admiral Carlo Bergamini to whom the ship is named after.

On 6 October 2011, her first sea trial took place.

On 14 September 2012, Carlo Bergamini, under the command of captain Gianmarco Conte, made its first entry into the Mar Grande naval station in Taranto at the end of the commemorations for the sinking of the battleship Roma, which was commanded by the frigate's namesake and who went down with the ship.

The ship carried out in the Gulf of Taranto, until August 2013, a series of tests by the personnel of the Air and Naval Training Center of the Navy for the certification of the functionality of all on-board systems and to carry out the testing and integration tests of the combat system and of the command and control system, through tests both at sea and in port.

Carlo Bergamini was delivered to the Navy on 29 May 2013, at the La Spezia headquarters. Her combat flag was delivered to her on 16 October 2013 in the port of Ancona. In November 2013 the unit started, as part of the naval campaign "the Country System in motion", the navigation for the circumnavigation of Africa with the 30th Naval Group.

== Gallery ==
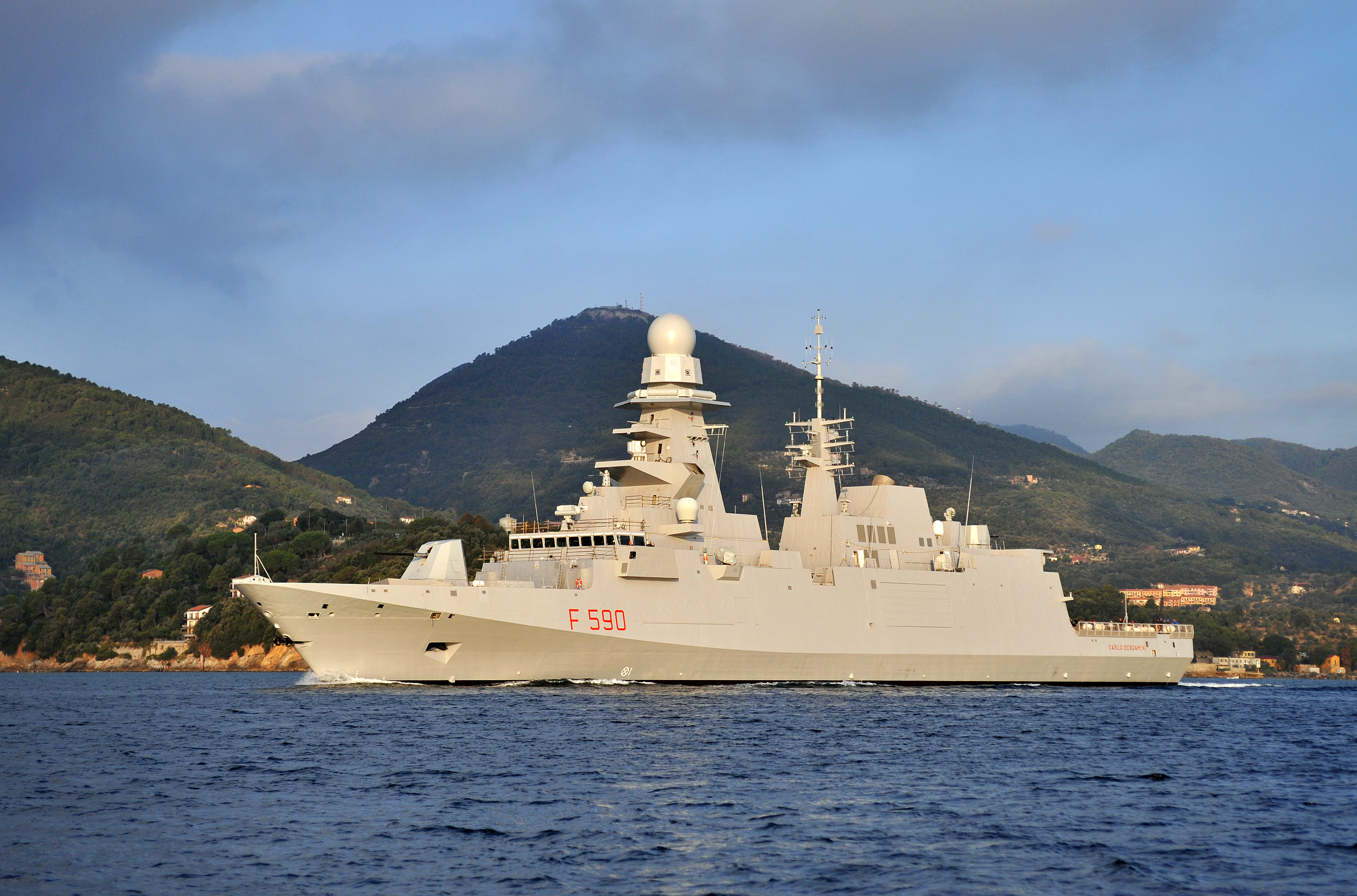
Carlo Bergamini on 6 October 2011.

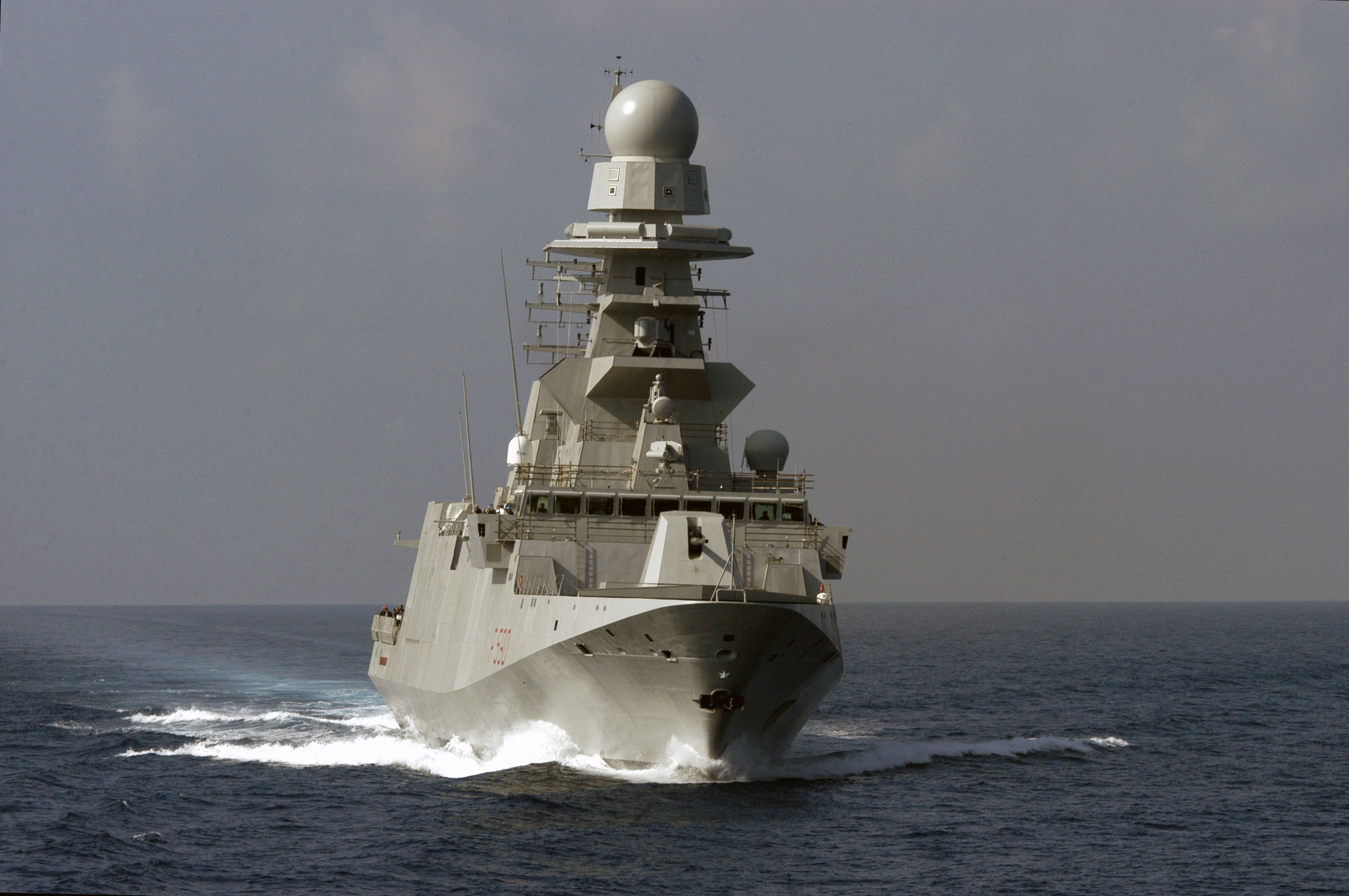
Carlo Bergamini underway on 6 October 2011.

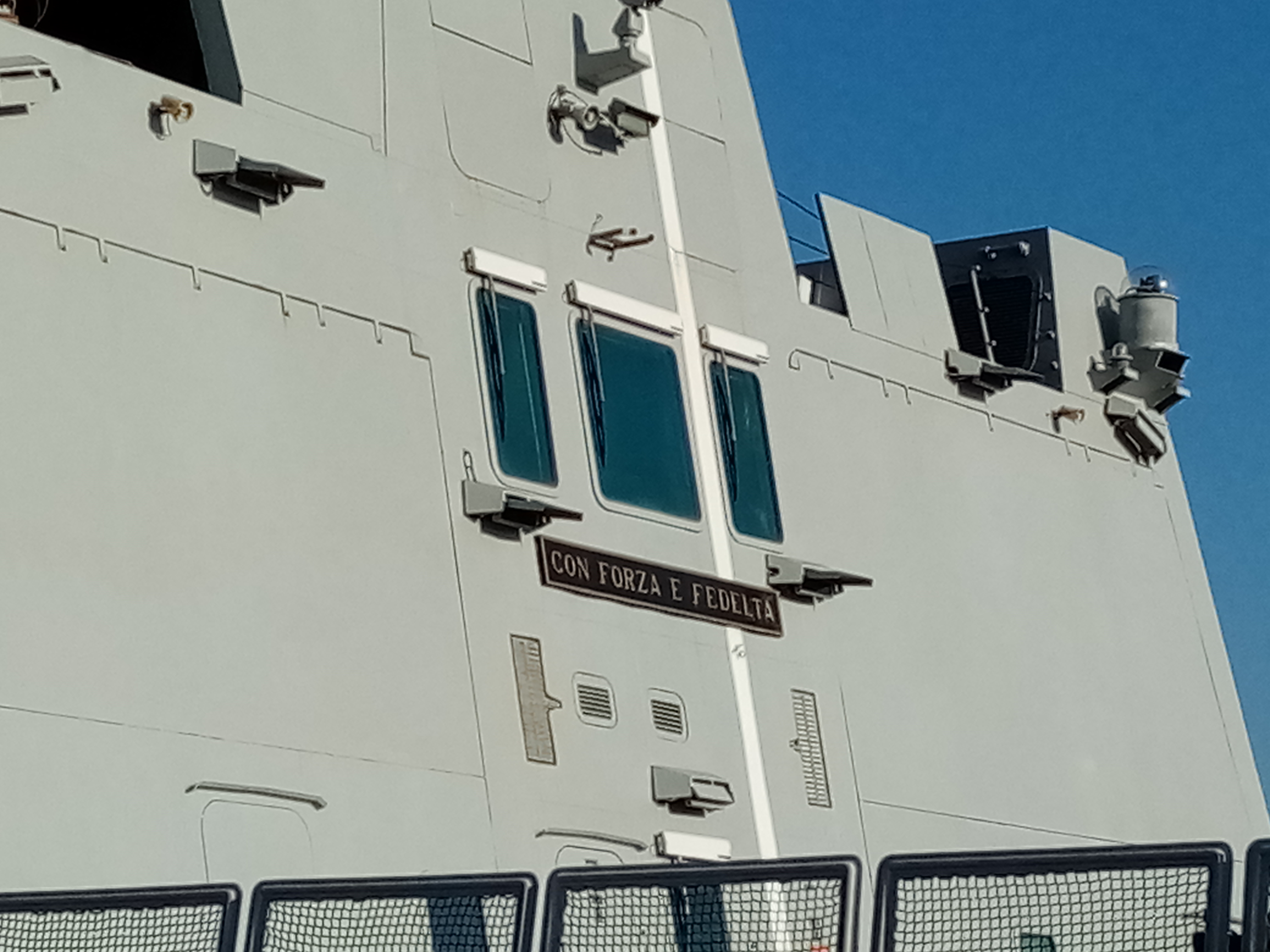
View of Carlo Bergamini's hanger on 1 October 2019.

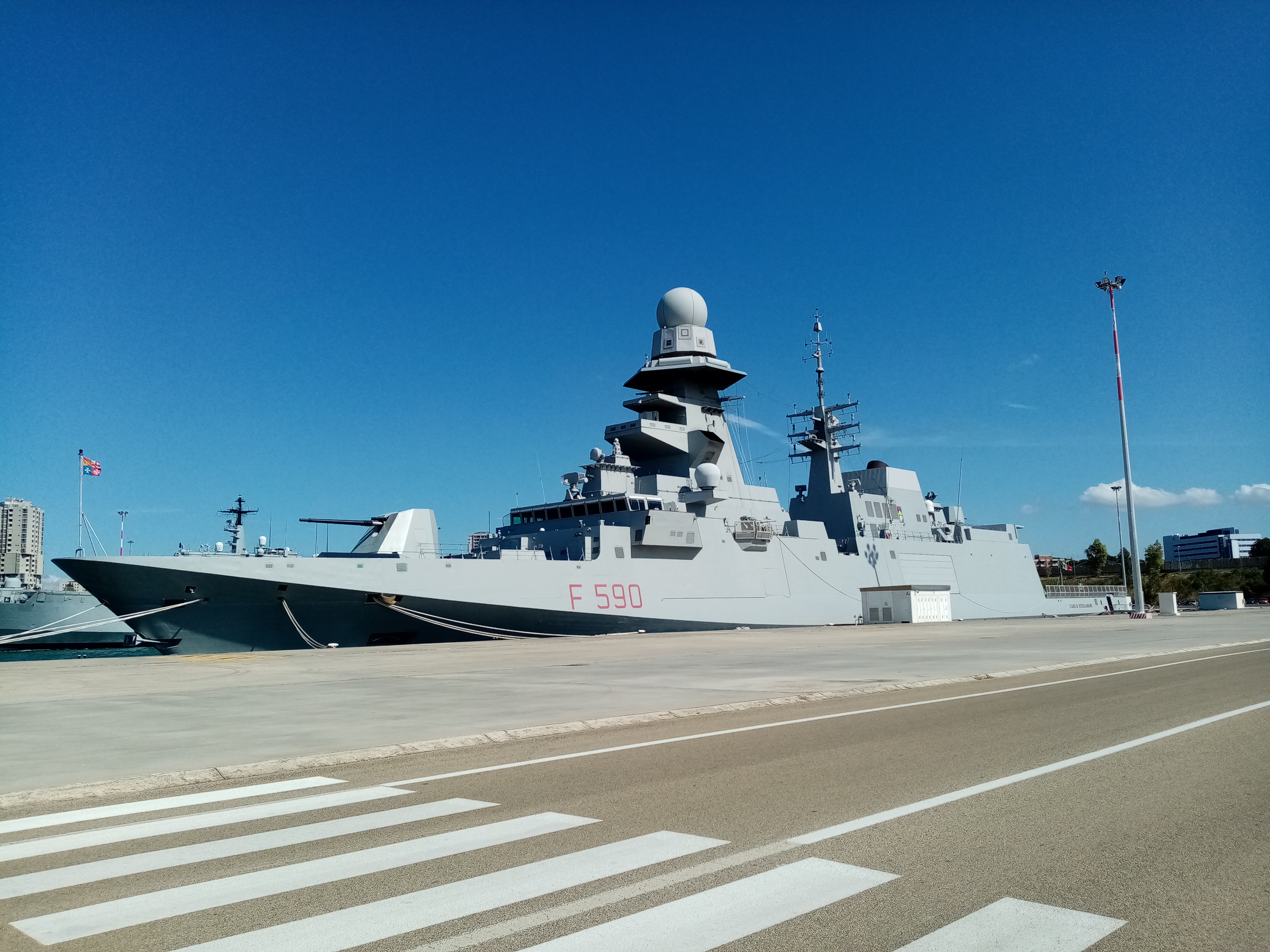
Carlo Bergamini at Naval Station Taranto on 4 October 2019.
