= Adone Del Cima =

Italian naval officer in WWII

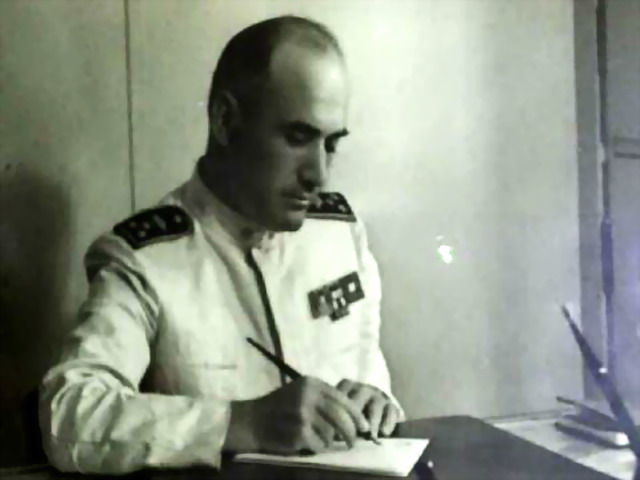
- Born: 7 June 1898; Torre del Lago, Tuscany, Italy
- Died: 9 September 1943 (aged 45); Mediterranean Sea
- Military career
- Allegiance: Kingdom of Italy
- Branch: Regia Marina
- Service years: 1917–1943
- Rank: Capitano di Vascello (Captain)
- Commands: Fulmine (destroyer); 8th Destroyer Squadron; 12th Torpedo Boat Squadron; Roma (battleship)
- Conflicts: World War I; Italian invasion of Albania; World War II
- Awards: Silver Medal of Military Valor (posthumous); War Cross for Military Valor (twice)

Adone Del Cima (7 June 1898 - 9 September 1943) was an officer of Regia Marina, the first and only commander of the battleship Roma.

== Life ==
Born in Viareggio in 1898, Del Cima graduated as a civilian sea captain in the Livorno Nautical Institute. On 1 November 1917, during the First World War, he volunteered as a Reserve Midshipman and joined the Royal Naval Crews Corps (Corpo Regi Equipaggi Marittimi, CREM); he was first assigned on the battleship Re Umberto and then on the armored cruiser San Marco. In 1919, for merits acquired in the war, Del Cima was named ensign in permanent service; he was given command of minesweepers tasked with demining the waters of Albania.

In 1923 he was promoted to lieutenant and assigned to the battleships Conte di Cavour and Giulio Cesare; he was then given command of a MAS squadron based in La Spezia. Between 1929 and 1930 Del Cima served in the maritime defense of La Spezia, after which he was transferred to Rome, at the Navy General Staff. In 1932 he was promoted to lieutenant commander and given command of the destroyer Fulmine; he was subsequently appointed executive officer of the battleship Conte di Cavour. In 1939, after promotion to commander, he was given command of the 8th Destroyer Squadron, with flag on Folgore; in April 1939 he took part in the Italian invasion of Albania, receiving a War Cross for Military Valor for the effective support given to the landing.

On 10 June 1940, at the entry of Italy into World War II, Del Cima was commander of the 12th Torpedo Boat Squadron, with flag on the torpedo boat Altair; in the following months he took part in several missions with his squadron, including a minelaying operation off Malta, that earned him a second War Cross for Military Valor. In November 1940 he was promoted to captain and transferred to the General Staff.

In October 1941, Del Cima was sent to Trieste as fitting-out director of the new battleship Roma, of which he was to become the commanding officer; he followed all the phases of the fitting out at the Monfalcone Shipyard, which ended on June 14, 1942, the day Del Cima assumed command.

On 9 September 1943, after the proclamation of the armistice of Cassibile, Roma left La Spezia heading for La Maddalena, along with the rest of the battle squadron, having on board the commander in chief, Admiral Carlo Bergamini. The fleet was to ultimately reach Bona, Algeria, where it would surrender to Allied forces. A few hours later, off Asinara island, the squadron was attacked by German Dornier Do 217 bombers carrying Fritz X radio-controlled bombs; two of them hit Roma, which sank after the violent deflagration of the forward ammunition magazines. Captain Del Cima and Admiral Bergamini went down with the ship, along with 1,391 officers and men.

Del Cima was posthumously awarded the Silver Medal of Military Valor, but the decoration was never handed over to his relatives.

Three of his descendants were given his name in his memory: his nephew Adone Spadaccini, founder of the Puccini Festival in Torre del Lago and Grand Officer of the Italian Republic for the dissemination of culture, Adonella Spadaccini, daughter of Adone Spadaccini, and Adone Michelangelo Domenico Ranieri Mario Prunetti, Adone Spadaccini's grandson.
