= Estanislao (disambiguation) =

Estanislao (c. 1798–1838) was a Lakisamni leader of Mission San José, Northern California.

Estanislao may also refer to:

== Places ==
- Estanislao del Campo, Formosa, Argentina
- San Estanislao, San Pedro, Paraguay
- San Estanislao, Bolívar, Colombia
- Mission San Estanislao del Ootcam, a now lost Jesuit mission in the Sonoran desert
- Rancho del Río Estanislao, a Mexican land grant in California, U.S.

=== Buildings and structures ===
- Brigadier Estanislao López Highway, a highway in Santa Fe, Argentina
- Estadio Brigadier General Estanislao López, a football stadium in Santa Fe, Argentina

== People ==
- Estanislao (name), people with the name
