= Estanislau =

Estanislau is a Catalan, Galician and Portuguese male given name and surname derived from the Slavic Stanislav. Notable people with the name include:

== Given name ==
=== Politicians and statesmen ===
- Estanislau da Silva (born 1952), East Timorese politician
- Estanis Condori (born 1978), Bolivian politician
- Estanislau Figueras (1819–1882), Spanish politician
- Estanislau Ruiz Ponsetti (1889–1967), Spanish engineer-turned-politician

=== Sports ===
- Estanislau Basora (1926–2012), Spanish footballer
- Estanis Pedrola (born 2003), full name Estanislau Pedrola Fortuny, Spanish footballer
- Pamplona (footballer) (1904–1973), real name Estanislau de Figueiredo Pamplona, Brazilian footballer

=== Other ===
- Estanislau Amadeu Kreutz (1928–2014), Brazilian Catholic bishop

== Surname ==
=== Nobility ===
- Infanta Adelgundes, Duchess of Guimarães (1858–1946), member of the House of Braganza
- Princess Maria Theresa of Braganza (1881–1945), member of the House of Braganza and Infanta of Portugal

=== Sports ===
- Pecka (footballer) (born 1989), real name Wellington de Jorge Estanislau Paeckart, Brazilian footballer

=== Other ===
- Maria do Carmo Estanislau do Amaral (born 1959), Brazilian botanist, biologist, curator, and academic
- Sérgio Estanislau do Amaral (1925–1996), Brazilian geologist

== See also ==
- Estanislao (name), the Spanish version of the name
- Stanislao, the Italian version of the name
