= Francis Buckley (businessman) =

Canadian businessman

Frank Buckley
- Born: April 8, 1921; Toronto, Ontario, Canada
- Died: February 1, 2016 (aged 94); Toronto, Ontario, Canada
- Education: University of Toronto
- Known for: President and spokesperson, Buckley's
- Awards: Order of Canada (2003)

Francis "Frank" C. Buckley, CM (April 8, 1921 – February 1, 2016) was president and spokesperson for the Buckley's company, founded by his adoptive father W.K. Buckley, in 1920. In 2005, the company was sold to Novartis.

In 2003, he was made a Member of the Order of Canada for being "an inspiring example of how one can positively influence the lives of many".

== Life ==
Buckley was born in Toronto, Ontario, Canada in 1921 and adopted by William Buckley, who had founded Buckley's Company in 1920; one year prior to Francis' adoption. He attended St. Michael's College School and graduated from the University of Toronto in 1942 with a bachelor's degree in commerce and finance. Shortly after graduating Buckley enlisted in the Royal Navy Fleet Air Arm as a carrier-based fighter pilot and served in World War II during his time with the Royal Navy Fleet. He started his career in the family business as a traveling door to door salesman for three years.

After Buckley had served his family business as a salesman, he took a position in the Management department. Frank Buckley was more interested in broadcast media, finance, and administration type of business while William was first and foremost a salesman; this dynamic element between the father-son combo proved to be an extremely and immensely effective tandem. William K. Buckley died in 1978. Frank Buckley assumed his adoptive father's position in the family business as the president.

In the mid-1980s Buckley became the spokesman for Buckley's. He first came on the scene as the spokesman when the company implemented the satirically honest ad campaign that owned up to Buckley's "awful taste". This campaign was featured on many television and radio commercials. Because of Buckley's time and success as the company's spokesman on the many featured commercials, he became a recognizable public figure.

Since Buckley was a small boy, he always sustained an interest in the pharmaceutical industry. Buckley served as the Proprietary Association of Canada's president—which as since been changed to the Non-Prescription Drug Manufacturers Association of Canada—and remained a member until his death. Buckley was always very active throughout his life and involved with many community service organizations. He died on February 1, 2016, in Toronto at the age of 94.
