= Stanislao Caraciotti =

Italian admiral

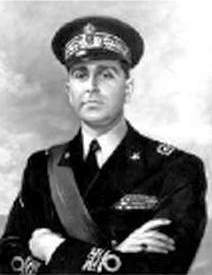
- Born: 11 December 1897; Rome, Lazio, Italy
- Died: 9 September 1943 (aged 45); Mediterranean Sea
- Military career
- Allegiance: Kingdom of Italy
- Branch: Regia Marina
- Service years: 1911–1943
- Rank: Contrammiraglio (Rear Admiral)
- Commands: Antonio Da Noli (destroyer); Libeccio (destroyer); Giuseppe Garibaldi (light cruiser); 10th Destroyer Squadron
- Conflicts: World War I; World War II; Battle of Calabria; Operation Achse
- Awards: Silver Medal of Military Valor (twice); Bronze Medal of Military Valor (twice); War Cross for Military Valor; Order of the Crown of Italy

Stanislao Caraciotti (11 December 1897 – 9 September 1943) was an Italian admiral during World War II.

== Biography ==
Born into an aristocratic family, originally hailing from Terni, Caraciotti entered the Italian Naval Academy in Livorno in 1911 and graduated as an ensign in 1915, participating in the First World War – initially on board battleships, and later, after promotion to lieutenant in 1916, in command of torpedo boats. After the war, he was promoted to lieutenant commander and became an aide to Eugene of Savoy, Duke of Ancona, as well as honorary ordnance officer of Thomas of Savoy, Duke of Genoa. In 1932, after promotion to commander, he was given command of the destroyer Antonio Da Noli and later Libeccio.

When Italy entered the Second World War, Caraciotti held the rank of captain and the command of the light cruiser Giuseppe Garibaldi, on which he took part in the Battle of Calabria on 9 July 1940, and later carried out interception missions against enemy naval forces, convoy escort and coastal bombardments against the Greek coasts. He was later appointed commander of the 10th Destroyer Squadron, with flag on the destroyer Maestrale; for his actions in this period, he received a Silver Medal of Military Valor, two Bronze Medals of Military Valor, and a War Cross for Military Valor.

In December 1941, Caraciotti was posted to the General Directorate of Personnel in Rome, a charge that he held even after his promotion to rear admiral in July 1942. In April 1943, he was designated Chief of Staff of the Naval Battle Force under Admiral Carlo Bergamini, and assigned to Bergamini's flagship Roma. Following the Armistice of Cassibile, Roma and the rest of the squadron left La Spezia on 9 September 1943, heading initially for La Maddalena, Sardinia. A few hours later, Roma was attacked off Asinara by German Dornier Do 217 bombers and sunk by two Fritz X bombs, which detonated the ship's magazines. Caraciotti, along with Bergamini and the entire battle force staff, was killed in the explosion. He was posthumously awarded another Silver Medal of Military Valor.
