= Italian battleship Roma (1940) =

Fast battleship of the Italian Royal Navy

Coordinates: 41°9′28″N 8°17′35″E

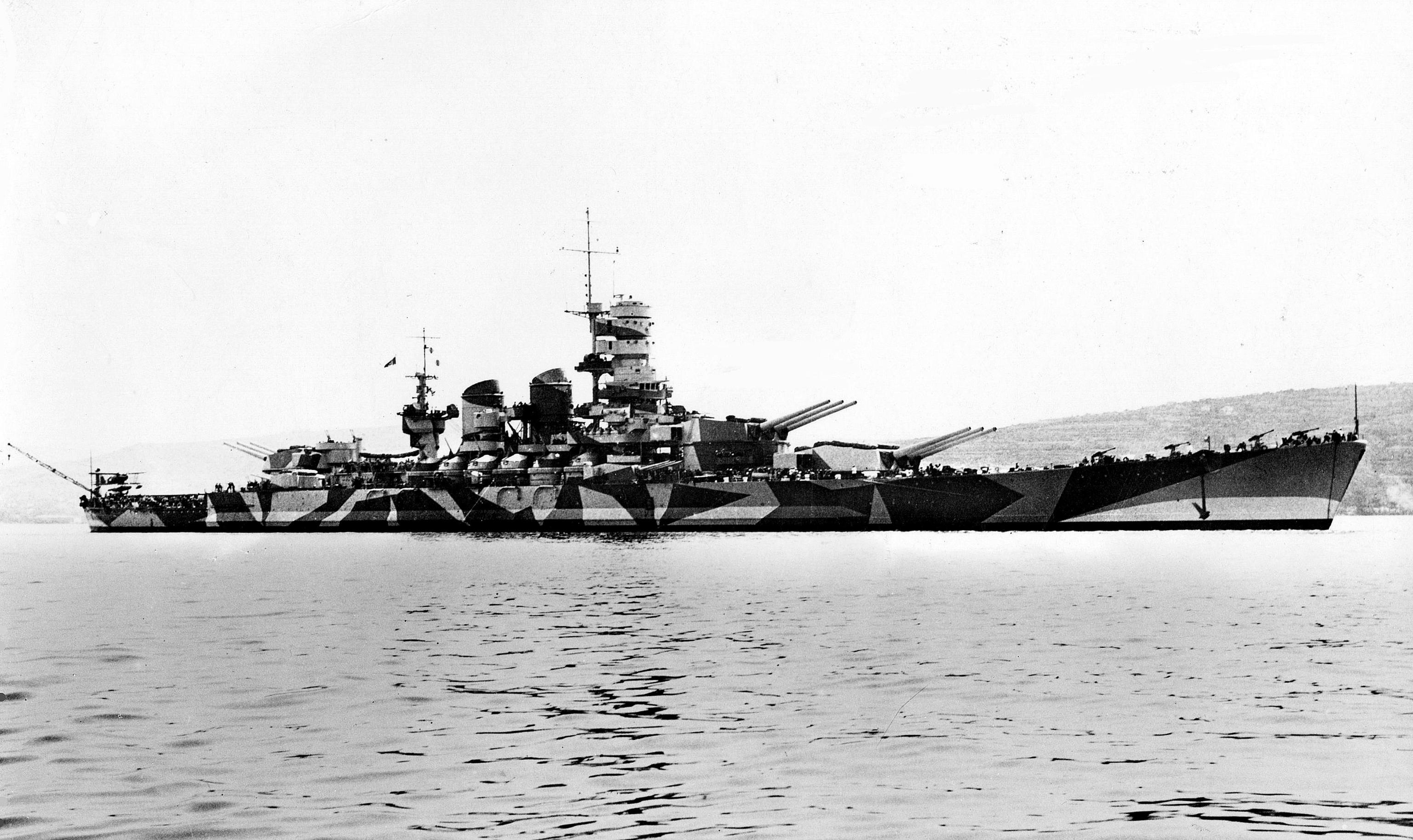

History

Italy
- Name: Roma
- Namesake: Rome
- Ordered: 1937
- Builder: Cantieri Riuniti dell'Adriatico
- Laid down: 18 September 1938
- Launched: 9 June 1940
- Commissioned: 14 June 1942
- In service: 21 August 1942
- Fate: Sunk 9 September 1943 by German aircraft

General characteristics
- Class & type: Littorio-class battleship
- Displacement: Full load: 45,485 long tons (46,215 t)
- Length: 240.68 m (789 ft 8 in) loa
- Beam: 32.82 m (107 ft 8 in)
- Draft: 9.6 m (31 ft 6 in)
- Installed power: 8 × Yarrow boilers; 128,000 shp (95,000 kW)
- Propulsion: 4 × steam turbines; 4 × screw propellers
- Speed: 30 kn (56 km/h; 35 mph)
- Complement: 1,830–1,950
- Armament: 9 × 381 mm (15 in) guns; 12 × 152 mm (6 in) guns; 4 × 120 mm (4.7 in)/40 guns; 12 × 90 mm (3.5 in) anti-aircraft guns; 20 × 37 mm (1.5 in) guns; 20 × 20 mm (0.79 in) guns
- Armor: Main belt: 350 mm (14 in); Deck: 162 mm (6.4 in); Turrets: 350 mm; Conning tower: 260 mm (10 in)
- Aircraft carried: 3 aircraft (IMAM Ro.43 or Reggiane Re.2000)
- Aviation facilities: 1 stern catapult

Roma, named after two previous ships and the city of Rome, (Note: In Latin and Italian, the city's name is Roma. Italian pronunciation: [ˈroːma]. While nominally the battleship were named for the ships and the city, Whitley claims that the name was also motivated by symbolism; when together, the choice of "Roma" and "Impero" (Empire) for the new battleships was meant to commemorate the King of Italy's crowning as the Emperor of Ethiopia in 1936, after the Second Italo-Abyssinian War.) was the third Littorio-class battleship of Italy's Regia Marina (Royal Navy). The construction of both Roma and her sister ship Impero was due to rising tensions around the world and the navy's fear that only two Littorios, even in company with older pre-First World War battleships, would not be enough to counter the British and French Mediterranean fleets in case of a possible Franco-British alliance. As Roma was laid down almost four years after the first two ships of the class, some small improvements were made to the design, including additional freeboard added to the bow.

Roma was commissioned into the Regia Marina on 14 June 1942, but a severe fuel shortage in Italy at that time prevented her from being deployed; instead, along with her sister ships Vittorio Veneto and Littorio, she was used to bolster the anti-aircraft defenses of various Italian cities. In this role, she was severely damaged twice in June 1943, from bomber raids on La Spezia. After repairs in Genoa through all of July and part of August, Roma was deployed as the flagship of Admiral Carlo Bergamini in a large battle group that eventually comprised the three Littorios, eight cruisers and eight destroyers. The battle group was scheduled to attack the Allied ships approaching Salerno to invade Italy (Operation "Avalanche") on 9 September 1943, but the news of the 8 September 1943 armistice with the Allies led to the operation being cancelled. The Italian fleet was instead ordered to sail to La Maddalena (Sardinia) and subsequently to Malta to surrender to the Allies.

While the force was in the Strait of Bonifacio, Dornier Do 217s of the German Luftwaffe's Kampfgeschwader 100—armed with Fritz X radio-controlled bombs—sighted the force. The first attack failed, but the second dealt Italia (ex-Littorio) and Roma severe damage. The hit on Roma caused water to flood two boiler rooms and the aft engine room, leaving the ship to limp along with two propellers, reduced power, and arc-induced fires in the stern of the ship. Shortly thereafter, another bomb slammed into the ship and detonated within the forward engine room, causing catastrophic flooding and the explosion of the number two main turret's magazines, throwing the turret itself into the sea. Sinking by the bow and listing to starboard, Roma capsized and broke in two, carrying 1,393 men—including Bergamini—down with her.

== Background ==
The Italian dictator Benito Mussolini did not authorize any large naval rearmament until 1933. Once he did, two old battleships of the Conte di Cavour class were sent to be modernized in the same year, and Vittorio Veneto and Littorio were laid down in 1934. In May 1935, the Italian Naval Ministry began preparing for a five-year naval building program that would include four battleships, three aircraft carriers, four cruisers, fifty-four submarines, and forty smaller ships. In December 1935, Admiral Domenico Cavagnari proposed to Mussolini that, among other things, two more battleships of the Littorio class be built to attempt to counter a possible Franco-British alliance—if the two countries combined forces, they would easily outnumber the Italian fleet. Mussolini postponed his decision, but later authorized planning for the two ships in January 1937. In December, they were approved and money was allocated for them; they were named Roma and Impero ("Empire").

Laid down nearly four years after Vittorio Veneto and Littorio, Roma was able to incorporate a few design improvements. Her bow was noticeably redesigned to give Roma additional freeboard; partway into construction, it was modified on the basis of experience with Vittorio Veneto so that it had had a finer end at the waterline. She was also equipped with thirty-two rather than twenty-four 20 mm (0.79 in)/65 caliber Breda guns. (Note: Whitley states that Roma was completed with 28 20 mm guns and the other two were originally equipped with 16, but Garzke & Dulin give 32 and 24.)

== Description ==
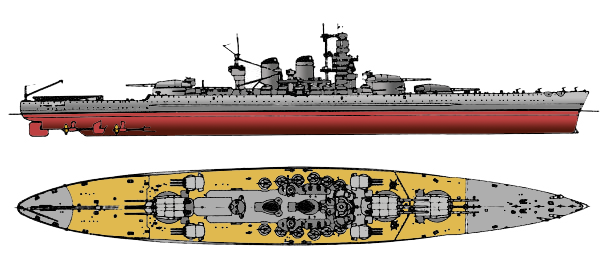
Drawing of the Littorio-class battleships

Roma was 240.68 m (789 ft 8 in) long overall and had a beam of 32.82 m (107 ft 8 in) and a draft of 9.6 m (31 ft 6 in). She was designed with a standard displacement of 40,992 long tons (41,650 t), a figure that like other Italian warships of the period would have violated the 35,000-long-ton (36,000 t) restriction of the Washington Naval Treaty if it had not expired shortly before Roma's keel laying. At full combat loading, she displaced 45,485 long tons (46,215 t). The ship was powered by four Belluzo geared steam turbines rated at 128,000 shaft horsepower (95,000 kW). Steam was provided by eight oil-fired Yarrow boilers. The engines provided a top speed of 30 knots (56 km/h; 35 mph) and a range of 3,920 nautical miles (7,260 km; 4,510 mi) at 20 knots (37 km/h; 23 mph). Roma had a crew of 1,830 to 1,950. Roma was fitted with a catapult on her stern and equipped with three IMAM Ro.43 reconnaissance float planes or Reggiane Re.2000 fighters.

Roma's main armament consisted of nine 381 mm (15 in) 50-caliber Model 1934 guns in three triple turrets; two turrets were placed forward in a superfiring arrangement and the third was located aft. Her secondary anti-surface armament consisted of twelve 152 mm (6 in) /55 Model 1934/35 guns in four triple turrets amidships. These were supplemented by four 120 mm (4.7 in) /40 Model 1891/92 guns in single mounts; these guns were old weapons and were primarily intended to fire star shells. Roma was equipped with an anti-aircraft battery that comprised twelve 90 mm (3.5 in) /50 Model 1938 guns in single mounts, twenty 37 mm (1.5 in) /54 guns in eight twin and four single mounts, and sixteen 20 mm (0.79 in) /65 guns in eight twin mounts.

The ship was protected by a main armor belt that was 280 mm (11 in) with a second layer of steel that was 70 mm (2.8 in) thick. The main deck was 162 mm (6.4 in) thick in the central area of the ship and reduced to 45 mm (1.8 in) in less critical areas. The main battery turrets were 350 mm (13.8 in) thick and the lower turret structure was housed in barbettes that were also 350 mm thick. The secondary turrets had 280 mm thick faces and the conning tower had 260 mm (10.2 in) thick sides.

== Service history ==
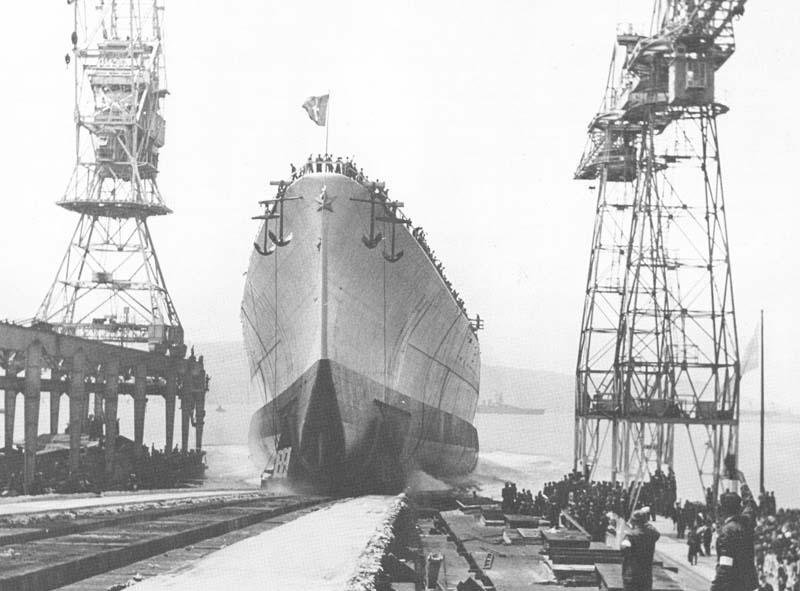
Roma being launched, June 9, 1940

Roma's keel was laid down by the Italian shipbuilder Cantieri Riuniti dell'Adriatico on 18 September 1938, and she was launched on 9 June 1940. After just over two years of fitting-out, the new battleship was commissioned into the Regia Marina on 14 June 1942. She arrived in the major naval base of Taranto on 21 August, and was assigned to the Ninth Naval Division. Although Roma took part in training exercises and was moved to various bases including Taranto, Naples, and La Spezia, in the next year, she did not go on any combat missions as the Italian Navy was desperately short of fuel. In fact, by the end of 1942, the only combat-ready battleships in the navy were the three Littorios because the fuel shortage had caused the four modernized battleships to be removed from service. When combined with a lack of capable vessels to escort the capital ships, the combat potential of the Italian Navy was virtually non-existent.

Roma and her two sisters were moved from Taranto to Naples, on 12 November, in response to the Allied invasion of North Africa; while en route, the three battleships were attacked by the British submarine HMS Umbra, though no hits were made. On 4 December, the United States launched a major air raid on Naples in an attempt to destroy the Italian fleet; one cruiser was destroyed and two others were damaged in the attack, as were four destroyers. Two days later, Roma was transferred with Vittorio Veneto and Littorio to La Spezia, where she became the flagship of the Regia Marina. They remained here through the first half of 1943, without going on any operations.

During this time, La Spezia was attacked many times by Allied bomber groups. Attacks on 14 and 19 April 1943, did not hit Roma, but an American raid on 5 June, severely damaged both Vittorio Veneto and Roma. B-17 aircraft carrying 908 kg (2,002 lb) armor-piercing bombs damaged the stationary battleships with two bombs each. Roma suffered from two near hits on either side of her bow. The starboard-side bomb hit the ship but passed through the side of the hull before exploding. The ship began taking on water through leaks from frames 221 to 226—an area covering about 32 square feet (3.0 m^{2})—and through flooding from the bow to frame 212. The second bomb missed but exploded in the water near the hull. Leaks were discovered over a 30 sq ft (2.8 m^{2}) area ranging from frames 198 and 207. Approximately 2,350 long tons (2,390 t) of water entered the ship.

Roma was damaged again by two bombs in another raid on 23–24 June. One hit the ship aft and to starboard of the rear main battery turret and obliterated several staterooms, which were promptly flooded from broken piping. The second landed atop the rear turret itself, but little damage was suffered due to the heavy armor in that location. This attack did not seriously damage Roma or cause any flooding, but she nevertheless sailed to Genoa for repairs. Roma reached the city on 1 July, and returned to La Spezia, on 13 August, once repairs were complete.

=== Loss ===
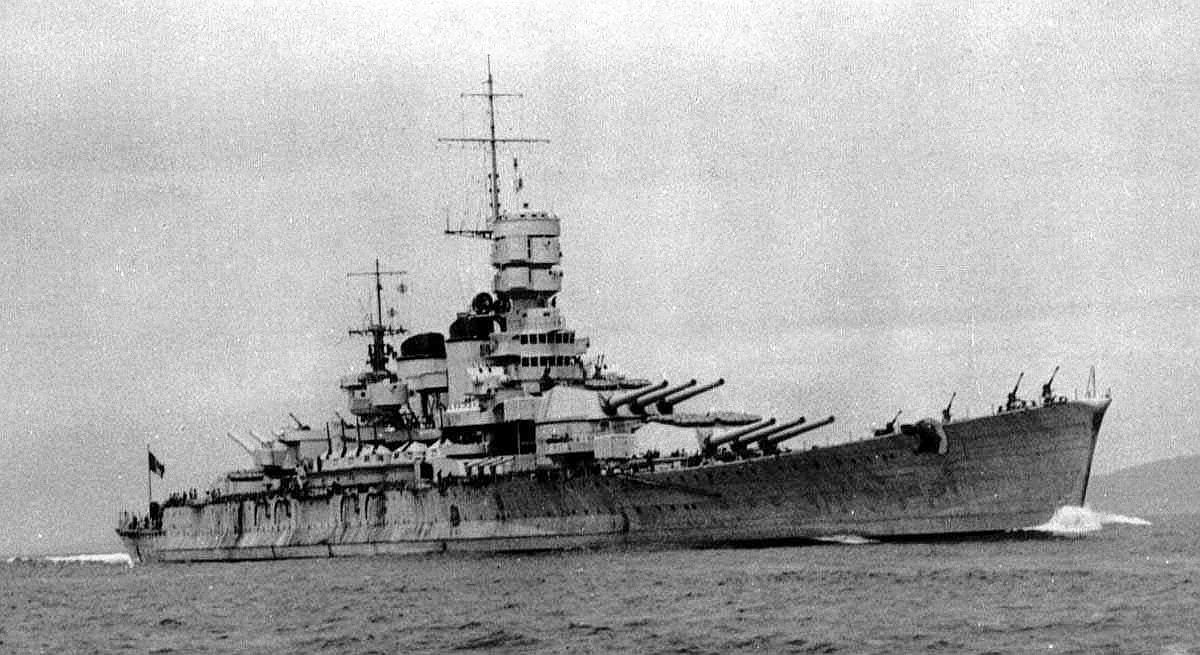
Roma underway

Along with many of the principal units of the Italian fleet—including Vittorio Veneto and Italia (the ex-Littorio) (Note: Littorio had been renamed on 25 July 1943, soon after the fall of Mussolini and the Fascist Party.)—the cruisers Eugenio di Savoia, Raimondo Montecuccoli, and Emanuele Filiberto Duca d'Aosta, and eight destroyers—Roma sailed from La Spezia with Adone Del Cima as captain and also as the flagship of Admiral Carlo Bergamini on 9 September 1943, a day after the proclamation of the 1943 Italian armistice. The group was later joined by three additional cruisers from Genoa, Luigi di Savoia Duca degli Abruzzi, Giuseppe Garibaldi, and Attilio Regolo.

On that same day, the fleet had been scheduled to sail towards Salerno in order to attack the Allied ships sailing to invade Italy as part of Operation Avalanche; the proclamation of the armistice on 8 September, however, had led to the cancellation of this operation. As German forces in Italy launched Operation Achse, Admiral Bergamini was ordered to leave La Spezia, in order to prevent the fleet from falling into German hands, and reach Allied-controlled ports. Due to Bergamini's initial reluctance to bring his ships to Malta (not knowing the details of the armistice and what would be the fate of the fleet once in Allied controlled ports) and to initial plans for the transfer of Victor Emmanuel III, his court and the government from Rome to La Maddalena, a naval base in Sardinia (the destroyers Vivaldi and Da Noli sailed from Genoa and La Spezia, heading for Civitavecchia, for this purpose), the initial destination was La Maddalena. Once at La Maddalena, Bergamini would receive further orders (to proceed to Malta) from Admiral Bruno Brivonesi, naval commander of Sardinia, as well as some documents regarding the conditions of the armistice for the Navy. The transfer of the king to La Maddalena was cancelled, however (he instead fled towards Pescara), and when the fleet arrived off La Maddalena, German troops had occupied that base to transfer their troops from Sardinia to Corsica, therefore the stop at La Maddalena was also cancelled and Supermarina ordered Bergamini to head for Allied-controlled Bône. The fleet then changed course, but when Germany learned that the Italian fleet was sailing towards an Allied base, the Luftwaffe sent Dornier Do 217s from Kampfgeschwader 100 armed with Fritz X radio-controlled bombs to attack the ships. These aircraft caught up with the force when it was in the Strait of Bonifacio.

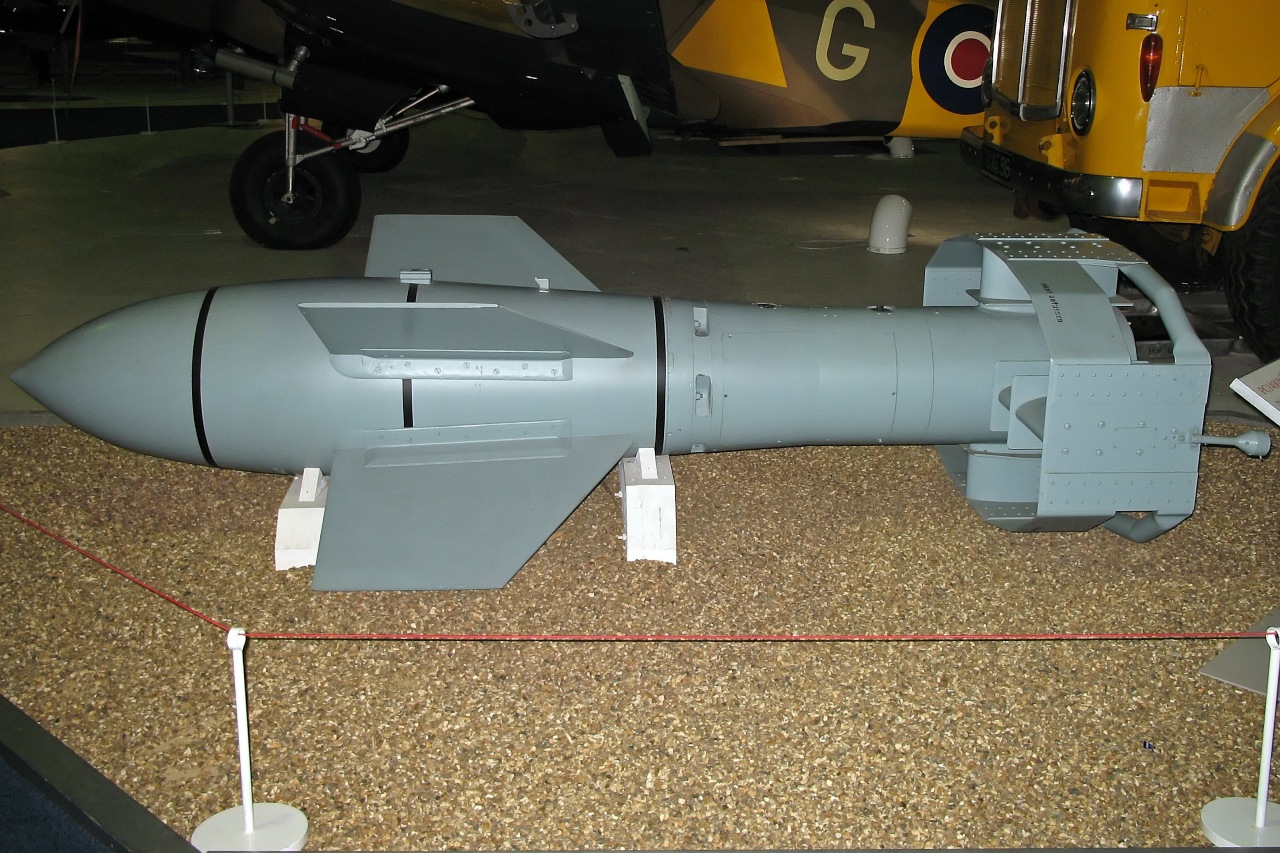
A Fritz X radio-controlled bomb

The Do 217s trailed the fleet for some time, but the Italian fleet did not open fire upon sighting them; they were trailing the fleet at such a distance that it was impossible to identify them as Allied or Axis, and Bergamini believed that they were the air cover promised to them by the Allies. However, an attack upon Italia and Roma at 15:37 spurred the fleet into action, as the anti-aircraft batteries onboard opened fire and all ships began evasive maneuvers. About fifteen minutes after this, Italia was hit on the starboard side underneath her fore main turrets, while Roma was hit on the same side somewhere between frames 100 and 108. This bomb passed through the ship and exploded beneath the keel, damaging the hull girder and allowing water to flood the after engine room and two boiler rooms. The flooding caused the inboard propellers to stop for want of power and started a large amount of arcing, which itself caused many electrical fires in the aft half of the ship.

Losing power and speed, Roma began to fall out of the battle group. Around 16:02, another Fritz X slammed into the starboard side of Roma's deck, between frames 123 and 136. It most likely detonated in the forward engine room, sparking flames, and causing heavy flooding in the magazines of main battery turret number two and the fore port side secondary battery turret, and putting even more pressure upon the previously stressed hull girder. Seconds after the initial blast, the number two 15-inch turret was blown over the side by a massive explosion, this time from the detonation of that turret's magazines.

This caused additional catastrophic flooding in the bow, and the battleship began to go down by the bow while listing more and more to starboard. The ship quickly capsized and broke in two. According to the official inquest conducted after the sinking, the ship had a crew of 1,849 when she sailed; 596 survived with 1,253 men going down with Roma. According to naval historian Francesco Mattesini, who cites the research of Pier Paolo Bergamini, the son of Admiral Bergamini, around two hundred men from Bergamini's staff were aboard Roma, and were mistakenly not included in the official inquiry. These men increased the total number aboard to 2,021 and the total fatalities to 1,393. Rear Admiral Stanislao Caraciotti was also killed. In her 15-month service life, Roma made 20 sorties, mostly in transfers between bases (none were to go into combat), covering 2,492 mi (4,010 km) and using 3,320 tonnes (3,270 long tons; 3,660 short tons) of fuel oil in 133 hours of sailing.

== Wreck discovery ==
The sunken vessel was found in June 2012, by the underwater robot Pluto Palla, designed by Italian engineer Guido Gay. It was discovered about 30 km (19 mi) off the northern coast of Sardinia, at a depth of around 1,000 m (3,281 ft). On 10 September 2012, a memorial ceremony was held on an Italian frigate over the spot where Roma went down. Giampaolo Di Paola, himself a former naval officer and at the time defence minister, at the ceremony described the dead sailors as "unwitting heroes who found their place in history because they carried out their duty right until the end". The last living Roma crewman who was on board during the attack died in May 2025.

== See also ==
- List of ships sunk by missiles
