= Italian ship Roma =

Roma was the name of three ships of the Regia Marina (Italian Royal Navy), and may refer to:

- Italian ironclad Roma, an armoured steam frigate commissioned in 1865 and scrapped in 1896
- Italian battleship Roma (1907), a predreadnought battleship of the Regina Elena class completed in 1908 and stricken in 1926
- Italian battleship Roma (1940), a battleship of the Vittorio Veneto class commissioned in 1942 and sunk in 1943
