= Danilo Djuricic =

Canadian basketball player

No. 33 – Scarborough Shooting Stars
- Position: Power forward / small forward
- League: CEBL

Personal information
- Born: February 20, 1999 (age 27) Brampton, Ontario
- Listed height: 6 ft 8 in (2.03 m)
- Listed weight: 225 lb (102 kg)

Career information
- High school: St. Michael's College (Toronto, Ontario)
- College: Harvard (2017–2021); Santa Clara (2021)
- Playing career: 2022–present

Career history
- 2022–2023: BC Brno
- 2022–present: Scarborough Shooting Stars

Career highlights
- CEBL champion (2023)
Medals
Men's basketball
Representing Canada
FIBA Under-19 World Cup
Gold medal – first place	2017 Egypt
FIBA Americas Under-16 Championship
Silver medal – second place	2015 Argentina	National team

Danilo Djuricic (born February 20, 1999) is a Canadian professional basketball player for the Scarborough Shooting Stars of the Canadian Elite Basketball League (CEBL). He played college basketball for Harvard and Santa Clara.

== High school career ==
A Canadian of Serbian and Montenegrin descent, Djuricic played for the St. Michael's College School Blue Raiders. St. Mike's head coach Jeff Zownir described him as "an unselfish team player, and a role model both on and off the court".

Ranked eighth in the Canadian National Player Rankings for the Class of 2017 (by northpolehoops.com), Djuricic committed to Harvard University in September 2016.

== College career ==
Djuricic was recruited to Harvard College from St. Michael's College School in Toronto, Ontario. In his freshman year, November 16, Djuricic had 14 points, 7 rebounds, 5 blocks in a losing effort against the Holy Cross Crusaders. After averaging 12 points, 4.5 rebounds, and 2.5 blocks on the weekend, Djuricic was named Ivy Rookie of the Week for the week of November 12–18. Djuricic ended his freshman year averaging 4.9 points, 2.7 rebounds and 0.5 blocks in 14 minutes per game.

In Djuricic's sophomore year on November 16, 2018 he notched a career high 20 points, 5 rebounds and 2 assists against Rhode Island Rams men's basketball. As a sophomore he averaged 6.2 points and 3.9 rebounds in 20 minutes per game with 11 total starts.

In Djuricic's junior year he scored 17 points on 7 for 9 shooting and pulled down 5 rebounds with 2 assists to lead Harvard past Yale Bulldogs men's basketball 78-77. Djuricic finished his sophomore campaign averaging 6.1 points and 4.3 rebounds and 0.7 assists in 18 minutes per game.

Djuricic unknowingly played his last game for Harvard in March 2020 as he was left without a senior year as the Ivy League opted to cancel their season due to the Coronavirus pandemic. On March 5, 2021 Djuricic announced he would be playing at Santa Clara University. He chose the Broncos over offers from Virginia Tech, Boston College and others.

== Professional career ==
On January 13, 2022, Djuricic signed with BC Brno of the Czech NBL.

On May 10, 2022, Djuricic signed with the Scarborough Shooting Stars of the Canadian Elite Basketball League.

On December 9, 2022, Djuricic re-signed with BC Brno.

On May 9, 2023, Djuricic re-signed with the Scarborough Shooting Stars.

== National team career ==
Djuricic averaged 12.2 points and 9.2 rebounds a game at the 2015 FIBA Americas Under-16 Championships en route to winning silver. He also represented Canada at the 2016 FIBA Under-17 World Championships and was a key member of Canada's gold-winning squad at the 2017 FIBA Under-19 World Cup, averaging 10.4 points and 4.7 rebounds a game, while leading his team in three-pointers made (14/37 in seven contests).
