= Estanislao del Campo =

Argentine poet (1834–1880)

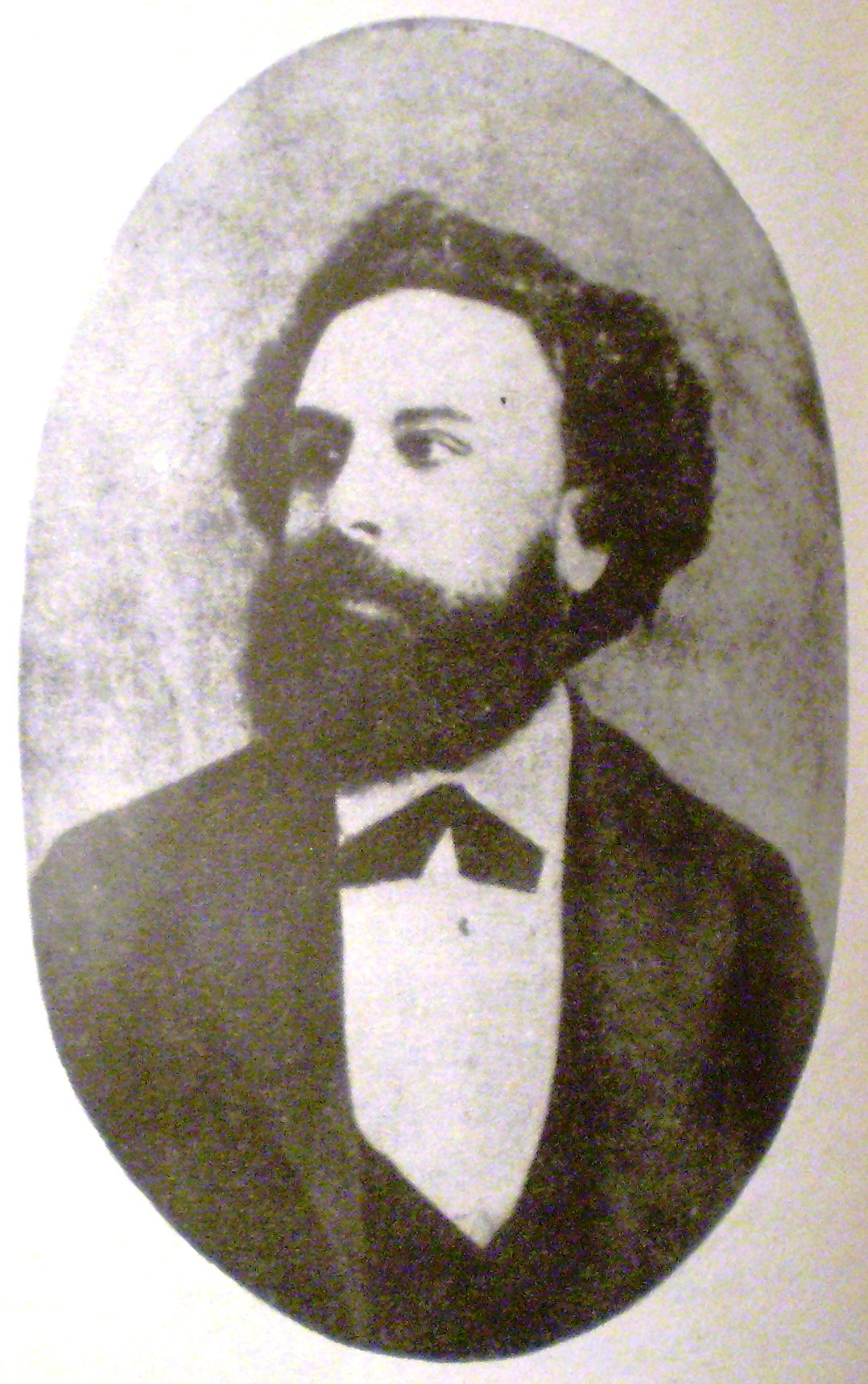
Estanislao del Campo.

Estanislao del Campo (February 7, 1834 – November 6, 1880) was an Argentine poet. Born in Buenos Aires to a unitarian family, he fought in the battles of Cepeda and Pavón, defending Buenos Aires.

He is best remembered for his 1866 satirical poem Fausto which describes the impressions of a gaucho who goes to see Charles Gounod's opera Faust, believing the events really to be happening. He also published his Collected Poems in 1870.

A street in the San Isidro neighbourhood in Buenos Aires is named after him. Estanislao del Campo is also the name of a small cotton-producing town in Formosa Province, Argentina.

== Works ==
- Los debates de Mitre (1857)
- Carta de Anastasio el Pollo sobre el beneficio de la Sra. La Grúa (1857)
- Fausto, Impresiones del gaucho Anastasio el Pollo en la representación de la ópera (1866)
- Poesías (1870, prologue by José Mármol)

== See also ==
- Argentine literature
- Gaucho literature
