= Italian cruiser Giuseppe Garibaldi (1936) =

Light cruiser warship in Italy

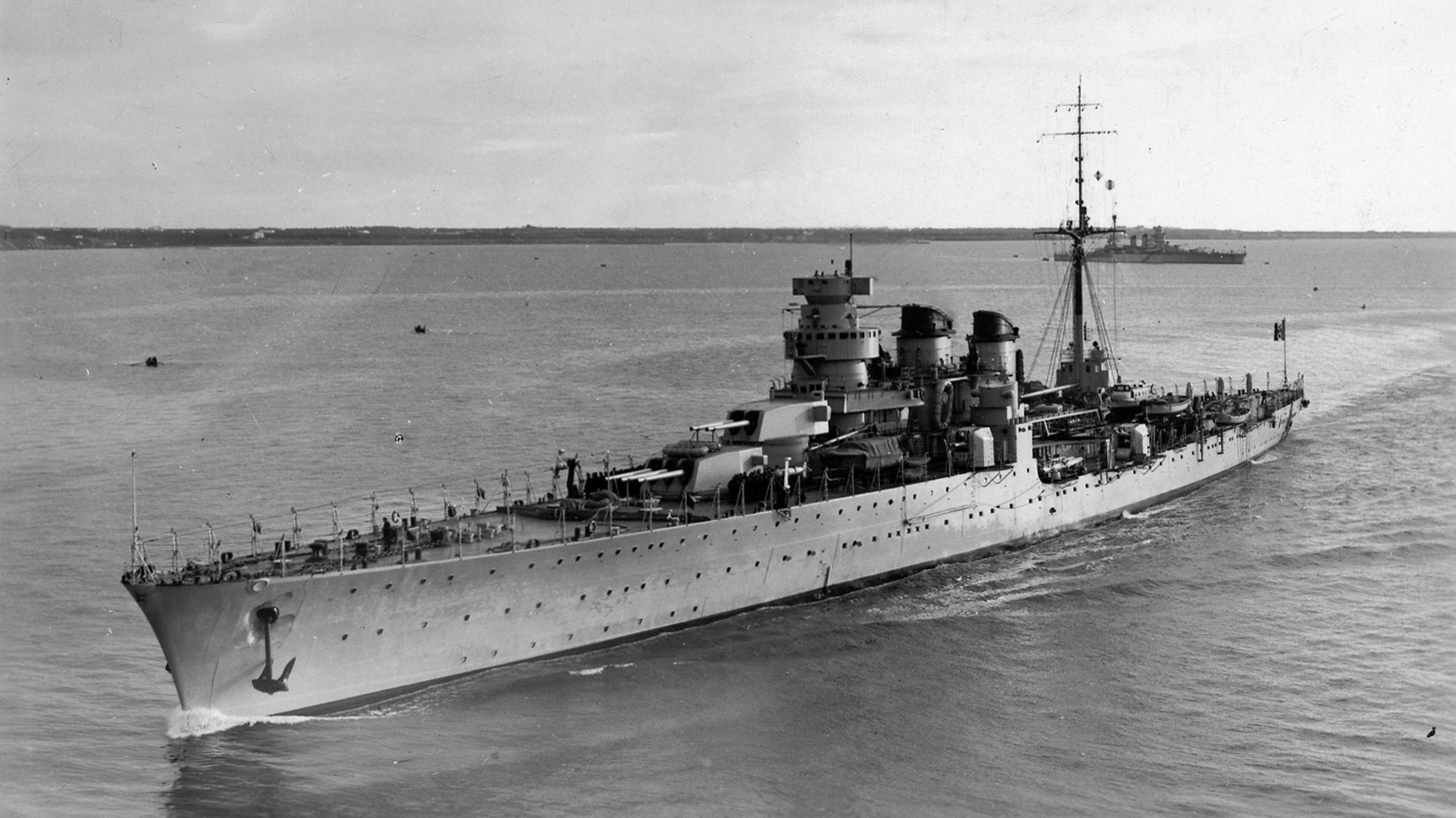
- Giuseppe Garibaldi in 1938

History

Italy
- Name: Giuseppe Garibaldi
- Namesake: Giuseppe Garibaldi
- Builder: C.R.D.A., Trieste
- Laid down: 28 December 1933
- Launched: 21 April 1936
- Commissioned: 1 December 1937
- Decommissioned: 1953
- Refit: 1957-1961
- Home port: Taranto
- Motto: "Obbedisco" (I obey)
- Fate: Reconstructed in 1957

General characteristics
- Class & type: Duca degli Abruzzi-class cruiser
- Displacement: Standard: 9,400 t (9,300 long tons; 10,400 short tons); Full: 11,735 t (11,550 long tons; 12,936 short tons)
- Length: Waterline: 171.1 m (561 ft 4 in); Overall: 187 m (613 ft 6 in)
- Beam: 18.9 m (62 ft 0 in)
- Draught: 6.9 m (22 ft 8 in)
- Propulsion: 8 Yarrow boilers; 2 turbine gears; 2 shafts; Total output: 100,000 hp (75,000 kW)
- Speed: 34 knots (63 km/h; 39 mph)
- Range: 4,125 mi (6,639 km) at 13 knots (24 km/h; 15 mph)
- Complement: 640
- Armament: 10 × 152 mm (6 in) mm guns; 8 × 100 mm (4 in) / 47 caliber guns; 8 × 37 mm (1.5 in) 54-cal. guns; 12 × 13.2 mm replaced with; 12 × 20 mm (0.79 in)/65; Wartime additional: 6 × 533 mm torpedo launchers; (removed in 1945); 2 × anti-submarines mortars
- Armour: Outer Belt: 30 mm (1.2 in); Inner Belt: 100 mm (3.9 in); Main Deck: 40 mm (1.6 in); Upper Deck: 10–15 mm (0.39–0.59 in); Turrets: 135 mm (5.3 in); Barbettes: 30–100 mm (1.2–3.9 in); Outer Bulkheads: 30 mm (1.2 in); Inner Bulkheads: 100 mm (3.9 in); Conning Tower: 30–140 mm (1.2–5.5 in)
- Aircraft carried: 4 x Ro.43
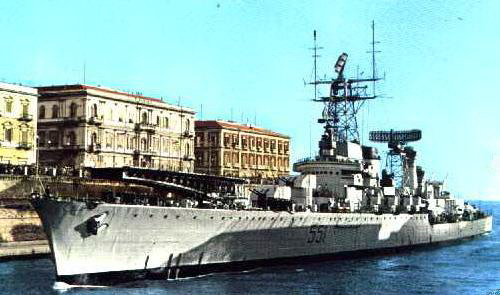
- Garibaldi in 1961

Italy
- Name: Giuseppe Garibaldi
- Builder: La Spezia
- Launched: 1961
- Commissioned: 1961
- Decommissioned: 1972
- Stricken: 1976
- Home port: Taranto
- Motto: Obbedisco; (I obey)
- Fate: Scrapped
- Notes: Pennant: 551

General characteristics
- Type: Unique Guided missile cruiser
- Displacement: Standard: 9,195 t (9,050 long tons; 10,136 short tons); Full: 11,350 t (11,170 long tons; 12,510 short tons)
- Length: Waterline: 171.1 m (561 ft 4 in); Overall: 187 m (613 ft 6 in)
- Beam: 18.9 m (62 ft 0 in)
- Draught: 6.7 m (22 ft 0 in)
- Propulsion: 6 Yarrow boilers; 2 turbine gears; 2 shafts; Total output: 85,000 hp (63,000 kW)
- Speed: 30 knots (56 km/h; 35 mph)
- Range: 4,125 mi (6,639 km) at 13 knots (24 km/h; 15 mph)
- Complement: 640
- Sensors & processing systems: 1 × AN/SPS-6 surface surveillance radar; 1 × MM/SPQ-2 navigation/surface surveillance radar; 1 × AN/SPS-39 Freescan 3D anti-air surveillance radar; 1 × Argos 5000 air surveillance radar; 2 × AN/SPG-55 tracking radars
- Armament: 2× Twin 135/45 mm gun; 8 × Oto Melara 76/62mm MMI gun; 4 × UGM-27 Polaris missile launchers; 1 × Mk 4 twin-arm launcher for RIM-2 Terrier SAM
- Armour: max 140 mm (5.5 in) (vertical); 40 mm (1.6 in) (horizontal)

Giuseppe Garibaldi was an Italian Duca degli Abruzzi-class light cruiser, that served in the Regia Marina during World War II. After the war she was retained by the Marina Militare and upgraded. She was built by CRDA, in Stabilimento Tecnico Triestino shipyard Trieste and named after the Italian general Giuseppe Garibaldi.

Decommissioned in 1956, Giuseppe Garibaldi was converted between 1957 and 1961, at the La Spezia shipyards, into a guided missile cruiser.

== Design ==
The Duca degli Abruzzi-class cruisers were the final version of the Condottieri class and were larger and better protected than their predecessors. The armament was also increased by two extra 152 mm guns, triple turrets replaced twins in the "A" and "Y" positions. The machinery was also revised which led to these ships having a slightly slower maximum speed than their predecessors.

== World War II service ==
=== 1940 ===
On 9 July at the Battle of Calabria, Giuseppe Garibaldi along with her sister, Luigi di Savoia Duca degli Abruzzi, fired the first rounds of the engagement. During the engagement, splinters from a 6-inch round fired by Giuseppe Garibaldi hit the British cruiser HMS Neptune, damaging her catapult and the reconnaissance aircraft beyond repair.

On 1 September, she was part of the fleet that attempted to intercept the Hats convoy and on 29 September, Giuseppe Garibaldi and the rest of the Italian fleet made another ineffectual sortie against Operation MB 5, a successful British attempt to ressuply Malta. On 11 November, Giuseppe Garibaldi was anchored at Taranto when British aircraft attacked the Italian fleet in the harbour.

=== 1941 ===
On 27 March, Giuseppe Garibaldi participated in the Battle of Cape Matapan. The commander of the ship at the time was Captain Stanislao Caraciotti. On 8 May she was part of an Italian force that failed to intercept Tiger convoy. On 28 July the cruiser was torpedoed and damaged by the British submarine HMS Upholder.

=== 1942 ===
On 3 January, the cruiser escorted Italian convoy M 43. On 7 March, Giuseppe Garibaldi took part in Operation V 5, escorting a large Axis convoy to Libya along with fellow Condottieri-class cruiser, Eugenio di Savoia. On 14 June Giuseppe Garibaldi participated in the successful action against convoy Vigorous, an attempt to resupply Malta by the Royal Navy.

After the armistice (8 September 1943), she operated in the South Atlantic together with Allied ships against potential German raiders.

== As a guided missile cruiser ==
Launch of a Terrier missile

After the war she was retained by the Italian Navy and modernized with minor changes of the armament and a radar. She was decommissioned in 1953 and reconstructed as a guided missile cruiser.

The new ship was rebuilt in the La Spezia Arsenal starting from 1957, and, at her completion in 1961, she was named flagship of the Italian Navy. The reconstruction included a complete overhauling of the superstructure, while the hull kept its original dimensions. Apart from some minor changes, much of the latter's rebuilding included four launchers for the U.S. designed UGM-27 Polaris nuclear ballistic missiles. The US never provided the missiles. Instead the Italian government set to develop an indigenous missile, called Alfa. The propulsion system remained the same. The rest of the armament was radically altered: a RIM-2 Terrier missile launcher made Giuseppe Garibaldi the first missile cruiser in Europe. The previous artillery was replaced by four 135 mm/45 guns in two twin turrets and eight Oto Melara 76 mm/62 Type MMI AA guns. Electronics included several radars and fire control systems.

She was decommissioned in 1971 and scrapped the following year.
