= Estanislao Medina Huesca =

Equatoguinean writer (born 1990)

Estanislao Medina
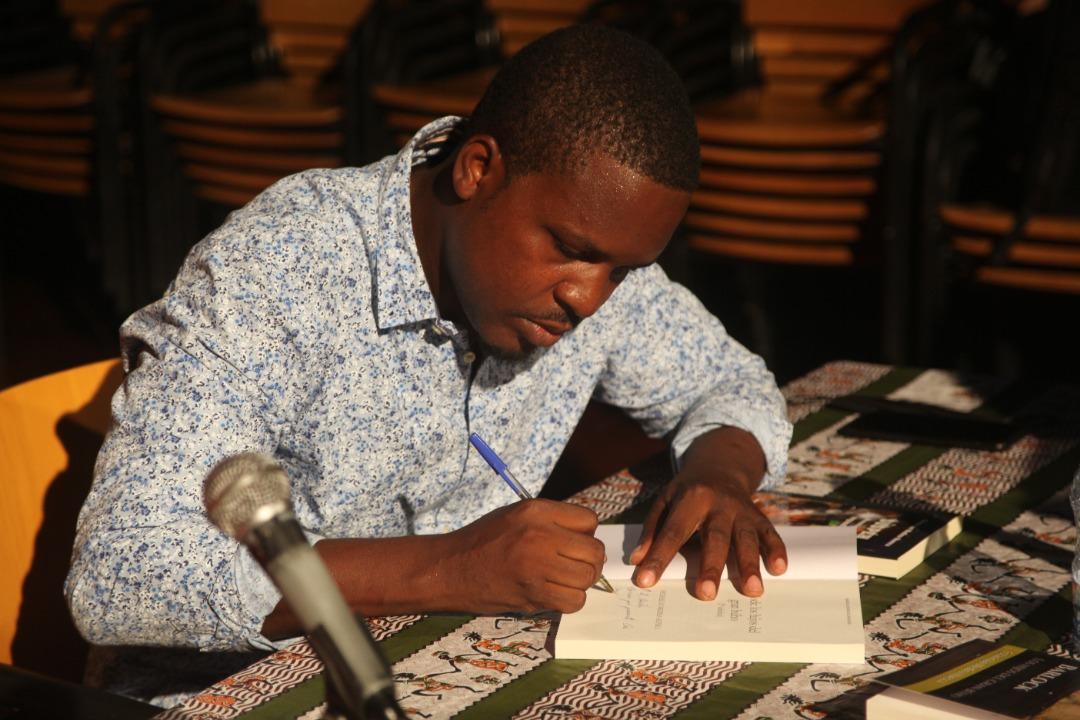
- Medina in 2022
- Born: Estanislao Medina Huesca; 1990 (age 35–36); Malabo, Equatorial Guinea
- Occupation: Writer
- Writing career
- Language: Spanish

Estanislao Medina Huesca (born 1990) is an Equatorial Guinean writer. He was born in Malabo, and studied in Malabo, Segovia and Madrid. Medina has written several books, including Barlock: Los hijos del gran búho, El albino Micó and Suspéh: Memorias de un expandillero. In 2021, he was named by Granta magazine as one of the twenty-five best young writers under the age of thirty-five (35) in the Spanish language. He was part of a delegation of 14 representatives of "African Literature" at the 18th Fliven event. He has also been awarded with the AEGLE Miguel de Cervantes Literary Prize.
