= Sérgio Estanislau do Amaral =

- Born: 1925
- Died: October 18, 1996 (aged 70–71)

Sérgio Estanislau do Amaral (1925 – October 18, 1996) was a Brazilian geologist. He became a professor of geology at the Faculty of Philosophy, Sciences and Letters of the University of São Paulo in 1959. After his retirement, he was also professor of geosciences and taught geology, geography, biology and ecology at the Universidade Estadual Paulista Júlio de Mesquita Filho (Rio Claro).

Together with Viktor Leinz, in the early '60s, he was the author of the book Geologia Geral (General Geology), which was the first modern textbook in the field of geosciences in Brazil, which today is still in use. He also translated many books on geosciences, including "Geological History of Life." He did his doctoral and postdoctoral studies in the United States with Pettijohn (Johns Hopkins University, Baltimore). His habilitation thesis (Livre-docência) was on "Geology and Petrology of the Irati Formation (Permian) in São Paulo State." He made many contributions to the geological knowledge of the Irati formation, including the dolomitization process of carbonate rocks.

In 1999, Carvalho and Bertini named a fossil of tetrapod reptiles identified in the city of Marília "Mariliasuchus amarali" in his honor. Amaral was also a member of the Brazilian Academy of Sciences.

Amaral was a nephew of the Brazilian painter and designer Tarsila do Amaral.
