= Ricardo Estanislao Zulueta =

Ricardo E. Zulueta
- Born: October 25, 1962 (age 64); Havana, Cuba
- Education: Ph.D., M.F.A.
- Alma mater: University of Miami; New York University
- Known for: Interdisciplinary art, writing
- Awards: New York Foundation for the Arts Cintas Foundation; Oolite Arts; South Florida Cultural Consortium; Art Matters Foundation

Ricardo Estanislao Zulueta (Ricardo E. Zulueta; born 1962) is an interdisciplinary artist, scholar, and writer whose work has been exhibited internationally. Zulueta's interdisciplinary practice includes video, photography, software, mixed media, painting, sculpture, installation, public art/interventions, and performance. His work explores intersectional concerns of gender, sexuality, behavior, and identity within socio-political landscapes. His research and writing focuses on cinema, media, technology, queer studies, cultural studies, and art history.

== Early life and education ==
Zulueta was born in Havana, Cuba and grew up in Miami, Florida. During his career he has lived and worked in New York City and Miami. Zulueta studied Visual Art, Museum Studies, and Arts Policy at graduate school at New York University where he was selected to be the distinguished Helbein Scholar. Dr. Zulueta earned a Ph.D. in Cinema and Interactive Media Studies and an M.F.A. in Visual Arts from University of Miami where he was named a McKnight Doctoral Fellow.

== Career ==
Ricardo E. Zulueta has exhibited/presented his work nationally and internationally in venues such as the Grey Art Museum at New York University, White Columns, Artists Space, Western Front in Vancouver, Hessel Museum of Art at Bard College, Museo Alejandro Otero in Caracas, International Center for Photography in NYC, and the Smithsonian Museum In Washington, D.C., among others. His works can be found in collections including the International Center of Photography in New York; Cintas Foundation; Stanford University; University of Toronto; National Gallery of Canada; Philip Aarons and Shelley Fox Aarons Collection; Lehigh University Museum; Miami-Dade Public Library System Permanent Art Collection; Miami-Dade County Art in Public Places Collection; Museum of Art Fort Lauderdale; J.I. Kislak Corporate Art Collection; Jeffrey Steiner; and the Boca Raton Museum of Art.

== Awards and recognition ==
Zulueta has been the recipient of the New York Foundation for the Arts Artist Fellowship; Art Matters Foundation Artist Grant, The Ellies Creator Award from Oolite Arts; Cintas Foundation Visual Artist Fellowship; CAVA Fellowship from the National Foundation for Advancement in the Arts (n/k/a YoungArts); Artists Space Artist Grant, South Florida Cultural Consortium Visual/Media Art Fellowship, Miami Individual Artist Grant, Ludwig Vogelstein Foundation, and the Igor Foundation Artist Grant, among others. He has executed public art commissions for Miami-Dade County Art in Public Places and the San Francisco Arts Commission.

== Selected publications ==
Zulueta's artwork has been mentioned or featured in the following publications:

- Burnaway Reader, A Glitch in the Grid: Ricardo E. Zulueta and the Cyborgian Gaze, Claudia Mattos, Spring, 2023. https://burnaway.org/magazine/a-glitch-in-the-grid-ricardo-e-zulueta-and-the-cyborgian-gaze/
- Domesticated Homosapiens ... (catalog), Role Playing Consumer Status, Zulueta and Digital Culture, Berta Sichel, December, 2010.
- Art Nexus (magazine), Domesticated Homosapiens ... review, Dinorah Perez-Rementeria, March, 2011. https://www.artnexus.com/en/magazines/article-magazine-artnexus/5d63fbfe90cc21cf7c0a2d3a/80/ricardo-estanislao-zulueta
- Whole Cloth (book), Mildred Constantine and Laurel Reutor, Monacelli Press, 1998.
- Memoria: Cuban Art of the 20th Century (book), California/International Arts Foundation, published 2001.
- Mixed Blessings: New Art in a Multicultural America (book), Lucy Lippard, Pantheon Books, 1990.
- Images of Ambiente (book), Rudi Bleys, Continuum Publishing, 2000.
- Flash Art, Global Art - Ricardo Zulueta, Berta Sichel, January/February, 1998.
- Camera Austria International, Ricardo Zulueta, No. 62-63, pg. 94–104, Graz, Austria.
- Arte y Parte, La Segunda Piel, Juan Carlos Rego, No. 14, April–May 1998, Spain.
- Village Voice, Choices, Kim Levin, April 29, 1997, New York, New York.
- The New York Times. Still/Life, Charles Hagen, April 7, 1995, New York, New York.
- The New York Times, From Diversity Comes Struggle, Vicki Goldberg, Sec. H 39, November 27, 1994.
- Los Angeles Times, Action Station, Susan Kandel, Section F, August 31, 1995.
- Nueva Luz, Volume 4 #1, Deborah Willis (En Foco, Bronx, NY: 1993).
- European Photography, Humane Society, Suzanne Muchnic, July 1992, Göttingen, Germany.
- Ricardo Estanislao Zulueta (catalog), Anne H. Hoy and Kathleen M. McGuire, International Center for Photography and MOCHA, New York, New York, 1988.
- Artforum, Ricardo Estanislao Zulueta at MOCHA, Jude Schwendenwein, April 1989, New York, New York.

Zulueta has written the following peer-reviewed scholarly publications:

Book(s):

Zulueta, Ricardo E. (April 2018). Queer Art Camp Superstar: Decoding the Cinematic Cyberworld of Ryan Trecartin, State University of New York (SUNY) Press. http://www.sunypress.edu/p-6552-queer-art-camp-superstar.aspx

Book Chapters and Academic Journal Articles:

Zulueta, Ricardo E. (July 2016). "Nomadic Metrosexuals: Framing Beauty, Editing Ritual, and Exhibiting Masculinity in Deep Hearts," in Looking with Robert Gardner: Essays on His Films and Career, ed. by Rebecca Meyers, William Rothman, and Charles Warren, SUNY Press.

Zulueta, Ricardo E. (June 2015). "Gender Flux: Transatlantic Influence on Fashioning the American Crossdresser in Silent Cinema from 1913 to 1926." Fashion Theory, The Journal of Dress, Body and Culture, Bloomsbury Publishing.

Zulueta, Ricardo E. (Fall 2012). "Tomboy," Film & History: An Interdisciplinary Journal on Film and Television.
