= Buckley's =

Canadian medicine company

W. K. Buckley Limited is a Canadian company which produces the Buckley's brand of cold medicines. It is known for its marketing that takes deprecating pride in the syrup's unpleasant taste. It also offers children's medicine, which is sold under the brand name Jack & Jill. The company is located in Mississauga, Ontario. It is a subsidiary of Novartis.

The company was founded in 1919 by William Knapp Buckley (1890–1978), In 1978, after W. K. Buckley's death, his adopted son Frank Buckley became the president of the company. In the mid-1980s, Frank became spokesperson and the brand began using the slogan "It tastes awful. And it works."

Novartis purchased W. K. Buckley Ltd. in 2002.

== Buckley's Mixture ==
Buckley's Original Mixture is a cough syrup invented in 1919 in Toronto, Ontario, Canada, and still produced as of 2026. Noted for the strongly unpleasant taste referenced by the brand's slogan, its ingredients include ammonium carbonate, potassium bicarbonate, camphor, menthol, Canada balsam (Abies balsamea), sodium cyclamate, pine needle oil, and a tincture of capsicum. It is promoted for relief of coughs and congestion.

In March 2017, Health Canada issued a recall of Buckley's products due to a choking hazard from a faulty plastic seal.

The company stopped selling Buckley's DM, which contained dextromethorphan, in Canada in 2016. However, other mixtures containing this ingredient, such as Buckley's Dry Cough, are still sold.

== See also ==
- Antitussive
- Cough
