= Estanislao del Campo, Formosa =

Coordinates: 25°03′S 60°06′W

Estanislao del Campo (Formosa)
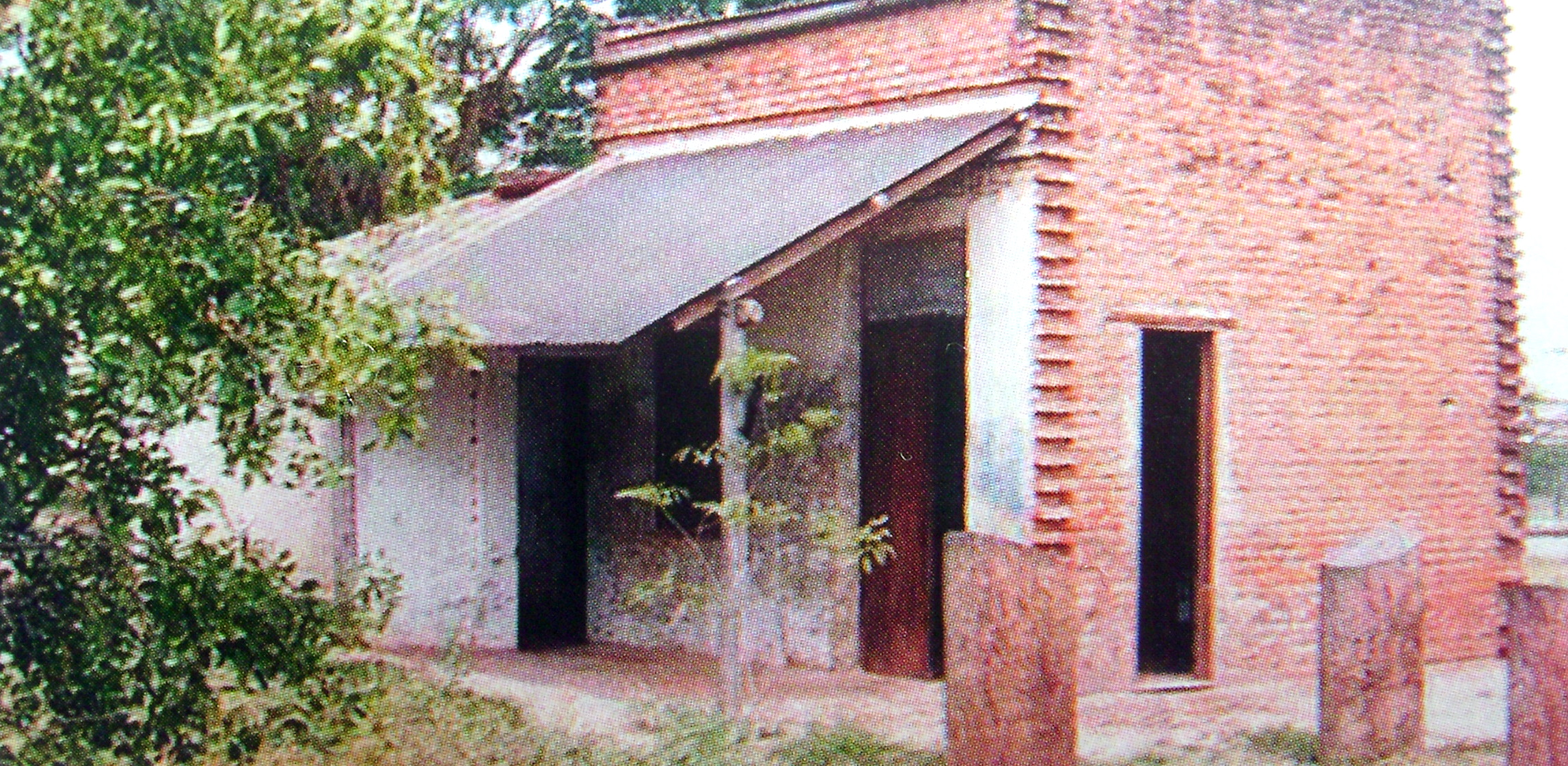
- Interactive map of Estanislao del Campo (Formosa)
- Country: Argentina
- Province: Formosa Province
- Time zone: UTC−3 (ART)
- Climate: Cfa

Estanislao del Campo (Formosa) is a settlement in northern Argentina. It is located in Formosa Province.
