= Estanislao Oziewicz =

Estanislao Oziewicz (born 1952) is a Canadian retired journalist. His work has appeared in the South China Morning Post, The Washington Post and the International Herald Tribune. He is a fellow at Massey College, University of Toronto. He was a contributor to China Hands, published by McClelland and Stewart. He was a finalist for Jack Webster Awards for best news story of the year.

From 1976 to 2013, he wrote and edited for The Globe and Mail newspaper. During his career at the Globe, he was a reporter, legislative correspondent at Queen’s Park and in Quebec City, deputy national editor, deputy foreign editor, FOCUS editor, religious affairs writer, immigration beat reporter, investigative reporter, China correspondent based in Beijing, war correspondent and foreign editor of globeandmail.com. When he retired from The Globe in July 2013, he was a morning news editor of globeandmail.com. From June, 2014 to May, 2015, Oziewicz was media relations/marketing manager for InPost Canada Inc.

An Argentine Canadian, Oziewicz was born in Buenos Aires into a family of Polish ancestry. The family emigrated to Canada in the 1950s. Oziewicz’s father, Mieczysław, was awarded the Commander's Cross of the Order of Polonia Restituta.
