= National roads in Poland =

Category of public roads in Poland

Map of national roads network in Poland (2021)

Standard national roads plates.

According to classes and categories of public roads in Poland, a national road (Polish: Droga krajowa) is a public trunk road controlled by the Polish central government authority, the General Directorship of National Roads and Motorways (Polish: Generalna Dyrekcja Dróg Krajowych i Autostrad). All motorways and expressways in Poland are classified as part of the national roads network.

Other types of roads in Poland are under the control of entities at voivodeship, powiat and gmina levels: voivodeship roads, powiat roads and gmina roads.

== National roads network ==
National roads include:

- motorways and expressways and other roads that are planned to be upgraded to motorways or expressways
- roads connecting the national road network
- roads to or from border crossings
- roads which are alternatives to toll roads
- beltways of major cities and metropolitan areas
- roads of military importance

Currently, there are 96 national roads in Poland (1–68, 70–97). Since 1 January 2014, there are new national roads: 89, 95, 96 and 97. In 2011 the total length was 18,801 km (11,680 mi). According to national roads state report of 2008 by GDDKiA 1/4 of national roads are capable of handling 11,5 tonnes per axle loads. Due to new regulation of General Director of National Roads and Motorways in August 2016 there is no longer national road 69. In January 2020, national road 98 was downgraded and removed from the national roads network.

== List of national roads ==
Polish national roads network consist of following roads, as of 2 April 2026:

| Number | Route |
|---|---|
| National road 1 | (Pruszcz Gdański) – Grudziądz – Toruń – Włocławek – Łódź – Piotrków Trybunalski – Częstochowa – Pyrzowice – Piekary Śląskie – Bytom – Gliwice – Żory – Gorzyczki – Czech border Pyrzowice ("Pyrzowice" junction) – Dąbrowa Górnicza – Tychy – Bielsko-Biała – Żywiec – Zwardoń – Slovak border ("Oświęcim" junction) – Bielsko-Biała ("Bielsko-Biała Hałcnów" junction) |
| National road 2 | German border – Świecko – Rzepin – Poznań – Konin – Łódź – Warsaw – Mińsk Mazowiecki – Siedlce – Międzyrzec Podlaski – Biała Podlaska – Terespol – Belarusian border |
| National road 3 | Świnoujście – Goleniów – Szczecin – Gorzów Wielkopolski – Zielona Góra – Lubin – Legnica – Bolków – Kamienna Góra – Lubawka – Czech border |
| National road 4 | German border – Jędrzychowice – Krzyżowa – Wrocław – Prądy – Nogowczyce – Gliwice – Katowice – Chrzanów – Kraków – Tarnów – Dębica – Rzeszów – Jarosław – Radymno – Korczowa – Ukrainian border |
| National road 5 | ("Nowe Marzy" junction) – Świecie – Bydgoszcz – Gniezno – Poznań ("Poznań Wschód" interchange – "Poznań Zachód" interchange) – Leszno – Wrocław – Kostomłoty – Dobromierz – Bolków – Jelenia Góra – Jakuszyce – Czech border ("Ostróda Południe" interchange) – (Wirwajdy) |
| National road 6 | German border – Kołbaskowo – Szczecin – Goleniów – Płoty – Kołobrzeg – Koszalin – Karwice – Słupsk – Lębork – Szemud – Gdynia – Gdańsk – Straszyn – Łęgowo |
| National road 7 | Gdynia (crossing with Morska Street) – ("Gdynia Wielki Kack" junction – "Chwaszczyno" junction) – Gdańsk – Elbląg – Ostróda – Olsztynek – Płońsk – Warsaw – Lesznowola – Grójec – Radom – Kielce – Kraków – Myślenice – Rabka-Zdrój – Chyżne – Slovak border Kraków ("Kraków Nowa Huta" junction – "Kraków Bieżanów" interchange) |
| National road 8 | Czech border – Kudowa-Zdrój – Kłodzko – Ząbkowice Śląskie – Wrocław – Oleśnica – Syców – Kępno – Złoczew – Sieradz – ("Łódź Południe" junction – "Piotrków Trybunalski Zachód" junction) – Piotrków Trybunalski – Rawa Mazowiecka – Warsaw – Radzymin – Wyszków – Ostrów Mazowiecka – Zambrów – Białystok – Korycin – Augustów – Raczki ("Raczki" junction) |
| National road 9 | Radom – Iłża – Ostrowiec Świętokrzyski – ("Opatów" junction) – Okalina-Kolonia – Lipnik – Klimontów – Łoniów – Nagnajów – Kolbuszowa – Głogów Małopolski – ("Rzeszów Północ" junction) |
| National road 10 | German border – Lubieszyn – Szczecin – Stargard – Wałcz – Piła – ("Bydgoszcz Zachód" interchange – "Bydgoszcz Błonie" junction) – Wypaleniska – Przyłubie – Toruń – Lipno – Sierpc – Drobin – Płońsk |
| National road 11 | Kołobrzeg – ("Kołobrzeg Wschód" junction – "Bielice" junction) – Koszalin – Bobolice – Szczecinek – Podgaje – Piła – Ujście – Chodzież – Oborniki – Poznań – Kórnik – Jarocin – Pleszew – Ostrów Wielkopolski – Ostrzeszów – Kępno – Kluczbork – Lubliniec – Tworóg – Bytom |
| National road 12 | German border – Łęknica – Żary – Żagań – Szprotawa – Przemków – Radwanice – (Drożów) – Głogów – Szlichtyngowa – Wschowa – Leszno – Gostyń – Jarocin – Pleszew – Kalisz – Błaszki – Sieradz – Łask – Rzgów – Piotrków Trybunalski – Sulejów – Opoczno – Przysucha – Radom – Zwoleń – Puławy – Kurów – Lublin – Piaski – Chełm – Dorohusk – Ukrainian border |
| National road 13 | Szczecin – Kołbaskowo – Rosówek – German border |
| National road 14 | (Łowicz) – ("Stryków" junction – "Emilia" junction) – Zgierz – Łódź – Dobroń – ("Róża" junction) ("Stryków" junction) – Łódź – ("Łódź Lublinek" junction) |
| National road 15 | Trzebnica – Milicz – Krotoszyn – Jarocin – Miąskowo – Miłosław – Września – Gniezno – … (Note: Discontinuity of the route course) – Trzemeszno – Wylatowo – Strzelno – Inowrocław – Toruń – Brodnica – Lubawa – ("Ostróda Zachód" junction) |
| National road 16 | (Dolna Grupa) – Grudziądz – Iława – (Wirwajdy – ("Ostróda Południe" interchange) – Olsztyn – Mrągowo – Ełk – Augustów – Pomorze – Poćkuny – Ogrodniki – Lithuanian border |
| National road 17 | Warsaw (Zakręt) – Garwolin – Ryki – Kurów – Lublin – Piaski – Krasnystaw – Zamość – Tomaszów Lubelski – Hrebenne – Ukrainian border |
| A18 autostrada (Poland) | German border – Olszyna – Golnice – Krzyżowa |
| National road 19 | Belarusian border – Kuźnica – Białystok – Siemiatycze – Międzyrzec Podlaski – Kock – Lubartów – Lublin – Kraśnik – Janów Lubelski – Nisko – Sokołów Małopolski – Rzeszów – Babica – Lutcza – Domaradz – Miejsce Piastowe – Dukla – Barwinek – Slovak border Świlcza ("Świlcza" junction) – Kielanówka ("Rzeszów Południe" junction) |
| National road 20 | ("Stargard Wschód" junction) – Stargard – Chociwel – Węgorzyno – Drawsko Pomorskie – Czaplinek – (Szczecinek) – Biały Bór – Miastko – Bytów – Kościerzyna – Żukowo – ("Żukowo" junction) |
| National road 21 | Miastko – Suchorze – Słupsk – Ustka |
| National road 22 | German border – Kostrzyn – Wałdowice – Gorzów Wielkopolski – Wałcz – Człuchów – Chojnice – Starogard Gdański – Czarlin – Malbork – Stare Pole – Elbląg – Chruściel – Grzechotki – Russian border |
| National road 23 | Myślibórz – Dębno – Sarbinowo |
| National road 24 | Pniewy – Gorzyń – Skwierzyna – Wałdowice |
| National road 25 | Bobolice – Biały Bór – Człuchów – Sępólno Krajeńskie – Koronowo – Bydgoszcz ("Bydgoszcz Opławiec" junction – "Bydgoszcz Południe" junction) – Inowrocław – Strzelno – Ślesin – Konin – Kalisz – Ostrów Wielkopolski – Antonin – ("Oleśnica Północ" junction) |
| National road 26 | German border – Krajnik Dolny – Chojna – Myślibórz – ("Myślibórz" junction) |
| National road 27 | German border – Przewóz – Żary – Zielona Góra |
| National road 28 | (Zator) – Wadowice – Rabka-Zdrój – Limanowa – Nowy Sącz – Gorlice – Jasło – Krosno – Sanok – Kuźmina – Bircza – Przemyśl – Medyka – Ukrainian border |
| National road 29 | German border – Słubice – (Krosno Odrzańskie) |
| National road 30 | ("Zgorzelec" junction) – Lubań – Gryfów Śląski – Pasiecznik – Jelenia Góra |
| National road 31 | Szczecin – Chojna – Sarbinowo – Kostrzyn – Słubice |
| National road 32 | German border – Gubinek – Połupin – Zielona Góra – Sulechów – Wolsztyn – ("Stęszew" junction) |
| National road 33 | Kłodzko – Międzylesie – Boboszów – Czech border |
| National road 34 | Świebodzice – Dobromierz |
| National road 35 | Czech border – Golińsk – Mieroszów – Wałbrzych – Świebodzice – Świdnica – ("Bielany Wrocławskie" junction) |
| National road 36 | Prochowice – Lubin – Ścinawa – Wińsko – Załęcze – Rawicz – Krotoszyn – Ostrów Wielkopolski – ("Ostrów Wlkp. Północ" junction) |
| National road 37 | Darłowo – (Karwice) |
| National road 38 | Czech border – Pietrowice – Głubczyce – (Reńska Wieś) |
| National road 39 | Łagiewniki – Strzelin – Biedrzychów – Owczary – Brzeg – Namysłów – Baranów |
| National road 40 | Czech border – Głuchołazy – Prudnik – Kędzierzyn Koźle – Pyskowice |
| National road 41 | (Nysa) – Prudnik – Trzebina – Czech border |
| National road 42 | Namysłów – Kluczbork – Praszka – Rudniki – Działoszyn – Pajęczno – Nowa Brzeźnica – Radomsko – Przedbórz – Ruda Maleniecka – Końskie – Skarżysko-Kamienna – Rudnik |
| National road 43 | (Wieluń) – Rudniki – Kłobuck – ("Częstochowa Jasna Gora" junction) |
| National road 44 | Gliwice – Mikołów – Tychy – Oświęcim – Zator – Skawina – (Kraków) |
| National road 45 | (Zabełków) – Krzyżanowice – Racibórz – Krapkowice – Opole – Kluczbork – Praszka – Wieluń – ("Złoczew" junction) |
| National road 46 | (Kłodzko) – Nysa – Opole – Ozimek – Lubliniec – Blachownia – Częstochowa – Janów – Szczekociny |
| National road 47 | ("Zabornia" junction) – Rabka-Zdrój – Nowy Targ – Zakopane |
| National road 48 | ("Tomaszów Maz. Centrum" junction) – Tomaszów Mazowiecki – Inowłódz – Potworów – Białobrzegi – Głowaczów – Kozienice – Dęblin – Moszczanka – ("Kock Północ" junction) |
| National road 49 | (Nowy Targ) – Czarna Góra – Jurgów – Slovak border |
| National road 50 | Ciechanów – Płońsk – Wyszogród – Sochaczew – Mszczonów – Grójec – Góra Kalwaria – Kołbiel – Mińsk Mazowiecki – Łochów – Ostrów Mazowiecka |
| National road 51 | Russian border – Bezledy – Bartoszyce – Lidzbark Warmiński – Dobre Miasto – Olsztyn – Olsztynek |
| National road 52 | Czech border – Cieszyn – Bielsko-Biała – Kęty – Wadowice – Głogoczów – Kraków – ("Kraków Południe" junction – "Balice I" junction) – Mistrzejowice |
| National road 53 | ("Olsztyn Pieczewo" junction) – Szczytno – Rozogi – Myszyniec – Ostrołęka – (Różan) |
| National road 54 | Chruściel – Braniewo – Gronowo – Russian border |
| National road 55 | ("Żuławy Wschód" junction) – Malbork – Kwidzyn – Grudziądz – Stolno |
| National road 56 | (Koronowo) – ("Trzeciewiec" junction) |
| National road 57 | Bartoszyce – Biskupiec – Szczytno – Przasnysz – Maków Mazowiecki – Pułtusk |
| National road 58 | Olsztynek – Zgniłocha – Jedwabno – Szczytno – Babięta – Ruciane-Nida – Pisz – Biała Piska – (Szczuczyn) |
| National road 59 | Giżycko – Ryn – Mrągowo – Nawiady – Rozogi |
| National road 60 | (Topola Królewska) – Kutno – Gostynin – Płock – Drobin – Glinojeck – Ciechanów – Maków Mazowiecki – Różan – Ostrów Mazowiecka |
| National road 61 | Warsaw – Jabłonna – Legionowo – Serock – Różan – ("Ostrów Mazowiecka Południe" junction – "Ostrów Mazowiecka Północ" interchange) – Łomża – Szczuczyn – Ełk – Raczki – Suwałki – Budzisko – Lithuanian border |
| National road 62 | Strzelno – Kobylniki – Radziejów – Brześć Kujawski – Włocławek – Nowy Duninów – Płock – Wyszogród – ("Zakroczym" junction – "Nowy Dwór Mazowiecki" junction) – Nowy Dwór Mazowiecki – Pomiechówek – Serock – Wierzbica – Wyszków – Łochów – Węgrów – Sokołów Podlaski – Drohiczyn – (Siemiatycze) |
| National road 63 | Russian border – Węgorzewo – Giżycko – Pisz – Kolno – ("Kolno" junction – "Łomża Południe" junction) – Stare Modzele – Zambrów – Ceranów – Sokołów Podlaski – Siedlce – Łuków – Radzyń Podlaski – Wisznice – Sławatycze – Belarusian border |
| National road 64 | ("Łomża Północ" junction) – Piątnica Poduchowna – Wizna – Jeżewo Stare |
| National road 65 | Russian border – Gołdap – Olecko – Ełk – Grajewo – Mońki – Białystok – Bobrowniki – Belarusian border |
| National road 66 | ("Zambrów Zachód" junction) – (Poryte-Jabłoń) – Zambrów – Wysokie Mazowieckie – Brańsk – Bielsk Podlaski – Kleszczele – Czeremcha – Połowce – Belarusian border |
| National road 67 | (Lipno) – Włocławek |
| National road 68 | Belarusian border – Kukuryki – (Wólka Dobryńska) |
| National road 69 | Road under construction: Lubiatowo (planned nuclear power plant) – (Łęczyce junction); Until 2016, the number was used for the route Bielsko-Biała – Żywiec – Zwardoń (Slovak border), which has since become a part of national road 1, while the old national road 1 from Bielsko-Biała to Cieszyn (Czech border) has become a part of national road 52. |
| National road 70 | Łowicz – Skierniewice – Huta Zawadzka |
| National road 71 | Stryków – Zgierz – … – ("Pabianice Północ" junction) – Rzgów |
| National road 72 | Konin – Turek – Uniejów – Balin – Łódź – Brzeziny – Rawa Mazowiecka |
| National road 73 | Wiśniówka – Kielce – Morawica – Busko Zdrój – Szczucin – Dąbrowa Tarnowska – Tarnów – Pilzno – Jasło |
| National road 74 | ("Wieluń" junction) – Wieluń – Bełchatów – Piotrków Trybunalski – Sulejów – Żarnów – Ruda Maleniecka – Kielce – Łagów – Opatów – Ożarów – Annopol – Kraśnik – Janów Lubelski – Frampol – Gorajec-Zastawie– Gorajec-Stara Wieś– Gorajec-Zagroble – Szczebrzeszyn – Zamość – Hrubieszów – Zosin – Ukrainian border Opatów ("Opatów" junction) – (Okalina-Kolonia) |
| National road 75 | (Kraków) – Niepołomice – ("Targowisko" junction) – Brzesko – Nowy Sącz – Krzyżówka – Tylicz – Muszynka – Slovak border |
| National road 76 | Wilga – Garwolin – Stoczek Łukowski – (Łuków) |
| National road 77 | Lipnik – Sandomierz – Stalowa Wola – Leżajsk – Tryńcza – Jarosław – Radymno – Przemyśl |
| National road 78 | Czech border – Chałupki – Wodzisław Śląski – Rybnik – Gliwice – Tarnowskie Góry – Świerklaniec – Siewierz – Zawiercie – Szczekociny – Nagłowice – Jędrzejów – Chmielnik |
| National road 79 | Warsaw – Góra Kalwaria – Kozienice – Zwoleń – Sandomierz – Połaniec – Nowe Brzesko – Kraków – Trzebinia – Chrzanów – Jaworzno – Katowice – Chorzów – Bytom Warsaw ("Marynarska" junction – "Warszawa Lotnisko" interchange) |
| National road 80 | ("Bydgoszcz Zachód" junction) – Bydgoszcz – Toruń – ("Lubicz" junction) |
| National road 81 | Katowice – Mikołów – Żory – Skoczów |
| National road 82 | ("Lublin Tatary" junction) – Łęczna – Cyców – Włodawa – Belarusian border |
| National road 83 | Turek – Dobra – Sieradz |
| National road 84 | Sanok – Lesko – Ustrzyki Dolne – Krościenko – Ukrainian border |
| National road 85 | Nowy Dwór Mazowiecki – (Kazuń); In 2026, the route was incorporated into and the number 85 was decommissioned. |
| National road 86 | Podwarpie ("Podwarpie" junction) – Wojkowice Kościelne – Będzin – Sosnowiec – Katowice – Tychy |
| National road 87 | (Nowy Sącz) – Stary Sącz – Piwniczna-Zdrój – Slovak border |
| National road 88 | Strzelce Opolskie – ("Strzelce Opolskie" junction – "Kleszczów" junction) – Gliwice – Bytom |
| National road 89 | Gdańsk (Westerplatte ferry terminal –) |
| National road 90 | (Jeleń) – (Baldram) (Note: currently road 90 is signed on stretch Kwidzyn – Korzeniewo – bridge over Wisła – Jeleń) |
| National road 91 | Gdańsk (port) – Tczew – Świecie – Toruń – Włocławek – Kowal – Krośniewice – ("Emilia" junction) – ("Róża" interchange – "Rzgów" junction) – Piotrków Trybunalski – Kamieńsk – Radomsko – Kłomnice – Częstochowa – Koziegłowy – Siewierz – Podwarpie ("Podwarpie" junction) |
| National road 92 | ("Rzepin" junction) – Świebodzin – Pniewy – Poznań – Września – Słupca – Golina – Konin – Kutno – Łowicz – Sochaczew – ("Warszawa Zachód" junction [sic] (Note: Warszawa Zachód junction is part of national road 8 (expressway S8); this error shows up on every regulation about the course of national roads since about 2012)) – … – (Zakręt) – Mińsk Mazowiecki – ("Siedlce Południe" junction) |
| National road 93 | German border to in Świnoujście |
| National road 94 | ("Zgorzelec" junction) – Bolesławiec – Krzywa – Chojnów – Legnica – Prochowice – Wrocław – Brzeg – Opole – Strzelce Opolskie – Toszek – Pyskowice – Bytom – Będzin – Sosnowiec – Dąbrowa Górnicza – Olkusz – ("Modlniczka" junction) – … – ("Kraków Wieliczka" junction) – Tarnów – Rzeszów – Jarosław – Radymno – Korczowa – road 1698R |
| National road 95 | ("Konstytucji 3 Maja" junction) – ("Grudziądz" junction) |
| National road 96 | ("Turzno" junction) – |
| National road 97 | ("Rzeszów Wschód" interchange) – (Rzeszów, Lwowska street) |
| National road 98 | "Wrocław Psie Pole" junction – Długołęka – Wrocław; Downgraded on 1 January 2020; the section from national road 8 to Mirków (near Długołęka) became voivodeship road 372 and the remainder through Wrocław became a gmina road. |
| National road 99 | Number has been unused since the network reform in 1999. |

== See also ==
- Highways in Poland
- Transport in Poland
