= Szczebrzeszyn Landscape Park =

Protected area in Poland

Coordinates: 50.6775°N 22.9024°E

- Szczebrzeszyński Park Krajobrazowy
- IUCN category V (protected landscape/seascape)
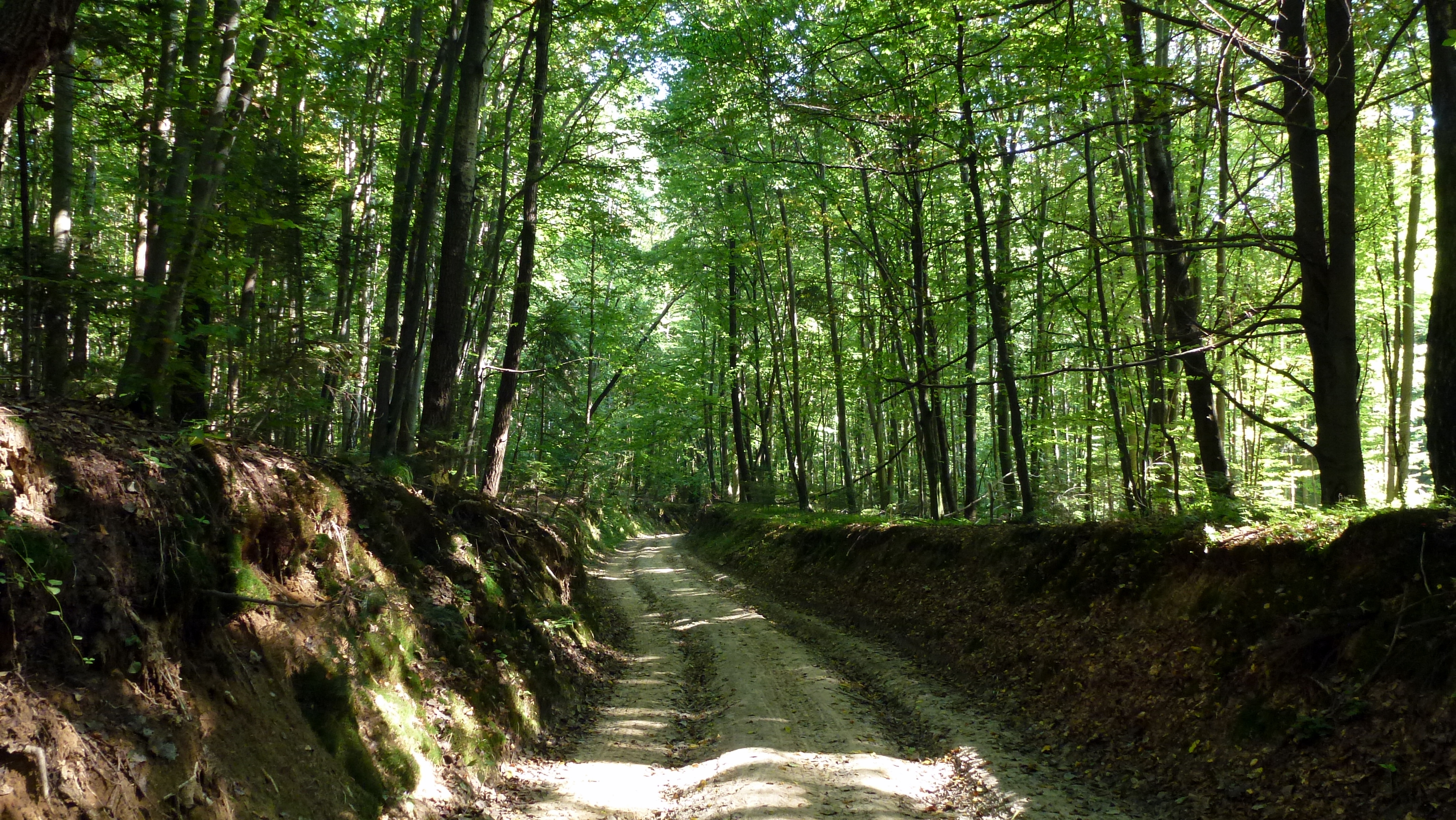
- Cetnar forest
- Interactive map of Szczebrzeszyn Landscape Park
- Location: Lublin Voivodeship
- Area: 202.09 km^{2} (78.03 sq mi)
- Established: 1991

Szczebrzeszyn Landscape Park (Polish: Szczebrzeszyński Park Krajobrazowy) is a protected area (Landscape Park) in Lublin Voivodeship in eastern Poland, created to protect the natural, cultural, and historic values of the Roztocze region. Almost the whole area of the Park is situated in the eastern part of the Western Roztocze region, with the valley of the Gorajec River and sections of the valleys of the Wieprz and Por Rivers within its territory.

== Characteristic features ==
The Park was established in 1991. It covers an area of 202.09 square kilometres (78.03 sq mi). Its characteristic features are numerous loess ravines, enriching the local landscape full of fields and forests. Of interest is the wet area of peatbog called Bagno Talandy where the Gorajec River has its source and picturesque springs in Trzęsiny, Radecznica, Zaporze, Szczebrzeszyn, Czarnystok, and Latyczyn.

== Vegetation and wildlife ==
The park's vegetation is diverse. The most precious are forests scattered all over the area, abundant in Carpathian beech trees covering the slopes of the hills and deep ravines. The Cetnar Forest located nearby Kawęczynek village is one of the most valuable. There are 10 nature monuments, and especially worthy of attention is a small-leaved-lime tree having a circumference of 920 cm growing in Szperòwka. The Park is rich in species of plants and animals under protection.

== Points of interest ==
The Park's varied landscape can be admired from many vantage points, the best of which is the Szperòwka-Dzielce section of the newly constructed national road. Also, local architectural monuments deserve a recommendation. The most interesting are the Benedictine Baroque Church, a monastery, and a park in Radecznica, church buildings and ruins of an old church in Mokrelipie, parish, and post-Franciscan churches, the Orthodox church and the synagogue in Szczebrzeszyn.
