= Stanisław Zybała =

Polish political prisoner, resistance member, economist and activist

Stanisław Zybała (23 March 1924, Zaburze – 17 January 2002, Białystok) was a Polish political prisoner of the Nazi concentration camp Majdanek in Lublin and a resistance member (Peasant's Battalions), after World War II an economist and subsequently an activist, co-founder and first chairman of the Białystok Branch of the Society for the Preservation of Majdanek.

Zybała was the eldest son of Jan (1898–1982) and Katarzyna née Jabłońska (1902–1977) and brother to Aniela (1930-2020), Jan (1933–1957) and Władysław (1935–1956); the family owned a small farm in Zaburze. On 12 October 1952, in Bielsk Podlaski, married Alina Maria Ruchała (1927–2015). Father of two children: Jolanta Anna Kloza (born 1955, an economist and activist) and Robert Marek (born 1958, a construction engineer). Died on 17 January 2002 in Białystok.

Member of Peasant's Battalions since November 1941 (codenames Kurka and Pilot). Arrested in Zaburze on 20 November 1942 and transported to a transit camp in Zwierzyniec. On 23 November 1942 imprisoned in a concentration camp at Majdanek in Lublin (serial number 6378). Released on 6 February 1943. In 1943 returned to resistance. In 1975 wrote imprisonment memoirs Piekło na ziemi [Hell on Earth], published posthumously in 2006.

Post-World War II graduated high schools in Zamość and Świdnica (1949), graduated economics in Wrocław (bachelor 1953) and Łódź (master 1959). In 1953 moved to Białystok and worked in the industry. Member of the Society of Fighters for Freedom and Democracy and the Polish United Workers' Party. Post-October 1956 engaged in the worker's movement. Retired in 1979.

On 20 February 1980 co-founded the Białystok Branch of the Society for the Preservation of Majdanek and presided over it till his death in 2002. In the 1980s, a representative of Maximilian-Kolbe-Werk for the region of Białystok.

Decorated with, among others, the Officer's Cross of the Order of Polonia Restituta (2001).
