= Open-air heritage museum in Kadzidłowo =

Coordinates: 53°42′44″N 21°29′18″E

Open-Air Museum in Kadzidłowo is a private open-air museum located in the village of Kadzidłowo (municipality of Ruciane-Nida, Warmian-Masurian Voivodeship) in Poland.

== History and activities ==
Krzysztof Worobiec, a geographer and regionalist, together with his wife Danuta, began in 1996 the relocation and reconstruction of historic wooden buildings from southern Masuria and the Masurian-Kurpie borderland. The museum is located in Kadzidłowo.

The open-air museum in Kadzidłowo includes, among others: a cottage from the early 20th century from Dąbrowy (Szczytno County), which now houses the "Oberża pod Psem" inn; a cottage from the early 20th century from Rozogi (Szczytno County), serving as guest accommodation; a small granary from the early 20th century from Piątkowizna (Ostrołęka County), adapted as a museum exhibition space; an arcaded granary from the same period (also from Ostrołęka County), transformed into a traditional Old Believer steam sauna ("banya"); an arcaded cottage from the late 18th or early 19th century from Warnowo (Pisz County), housing an ethnographic museum; a utility building from the early 20th century from the village of Kwiatuszki (Szczytno County), relocated from Wach (Ostrołęka County); the so-called “komnatka” (small room) added to the cottage from Dąbrowy (Oberża pod Psem); and a small granary from the early 20th century from an unidentified Masurian village, relocated from Ksebek (Kolno County).

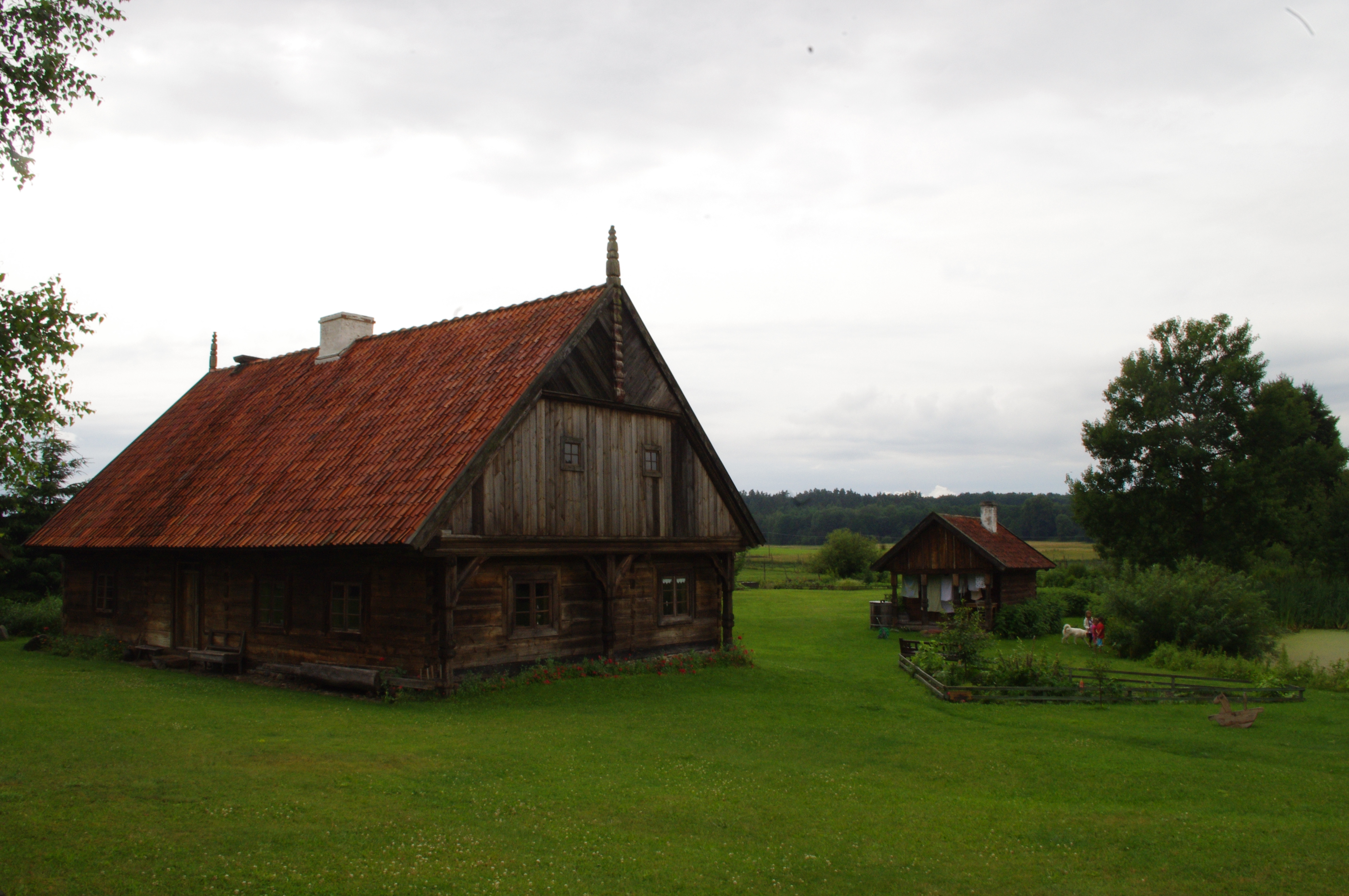
Open-Air Museum in Kadzidłowo – a section featuring a more than 200-year-old arcaded cottage from Warnowo and an arcaded granary

== Museum ==
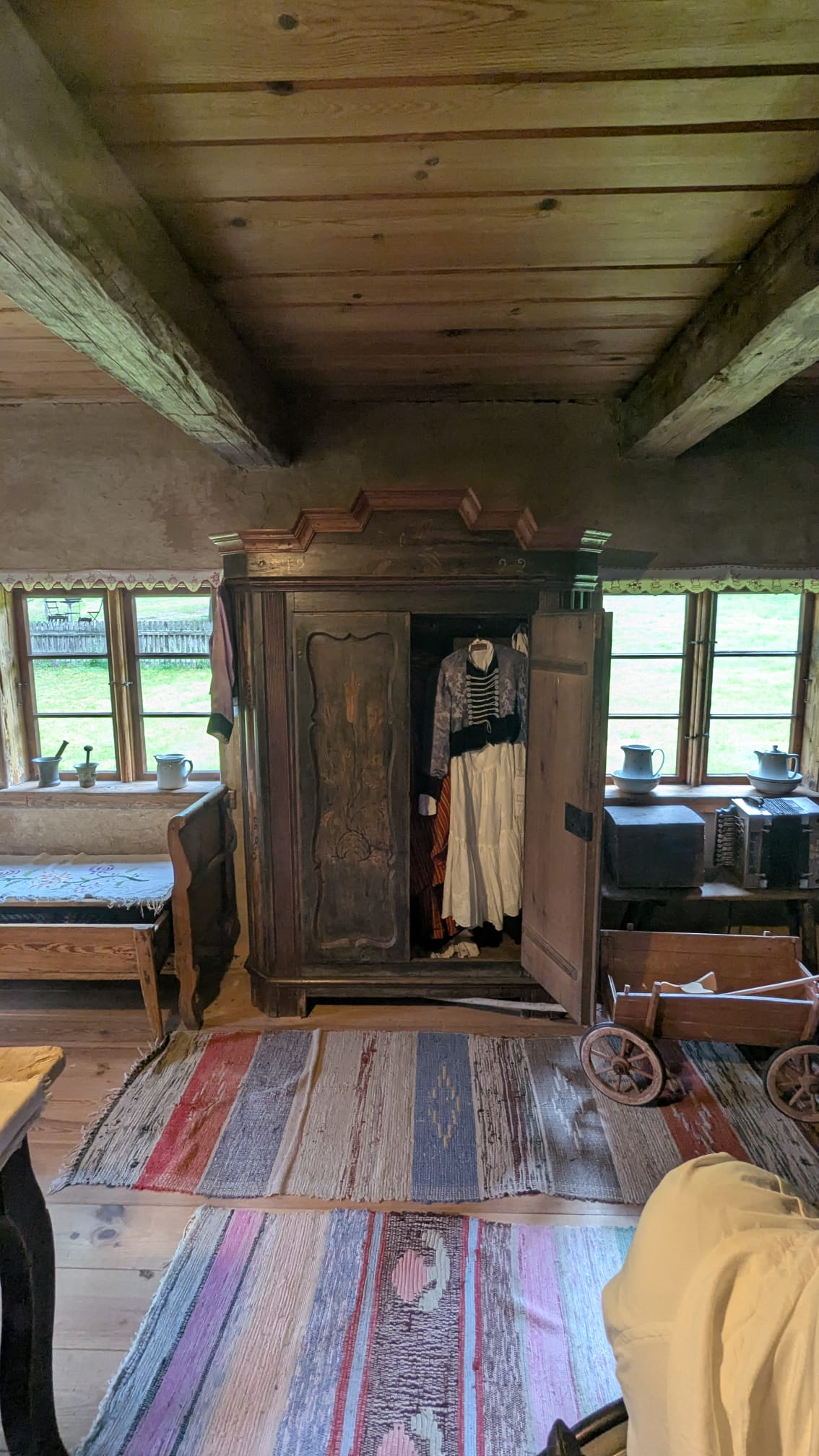
Interior of the reconstructed large living room with a flower-painted wardrobe from 1822. Next to it stands a sleeping bench (szlaban) and traditional wooden toys for children.

The museum exhibition is housed in a large wooden cottage with a gabled arcade, originally built by a wealthy farmer. It is characterized by three arcade-supporting posts, a decorative profiled beam, and pazdury(ornamental roof finials) along the roof ridge. The building is made of massive wooden beams, insulated with moss and clay plaster, and the wooden boards are joined using wooden pegs. Its relocation and reconstruction were completed in October 2003. The interiors of a traditional Masurian household from the early 20th century have been reconstructed inside the cottage. The ground floor rooms reflect the layout of a three-generation family structure: a large main room, a bedroom for the hosts and their children, and a room for the grandparents. One of the main attractions is the so-called black kitchen, also referred to as the Polish kitchen, the only room in the house constructed from brick. It features a massive, pyramid-shaped central chimney (known as a wide chimney), where cast iron pots (called grop), a tripod (known variously as drajfus, drejfus, or dynarek), and tools used in bread baking are displayed. The black kitchen also contains a traditional bread oven and a smokehouse – both of which are still in use.

The ground-floor rooms reconstruct the home of a wealthy farmer (gbur), illustrating how people lived in Masuria in the early 20th century. This section consists of a large main room and three alcoves: two bedrooms and a pantry. The main, largest room contains “representative” furniture, including a flower-painted wardrobe from 1822, a small blue corner cupboard known in Masuria as a rogal, and a blue painted dowry chest. There are also sleeping benches (szlabanki), and in the wall adjacent to the black kitchen, an open niche fireplace which provided light in the evenings. Above the dowry chest hangs a bouquet of white flowers, framed in black, made from fish scales. A button accordion of the heligonka type is also on display. In the adjacent alcove is the master bedroom with a child's bed that could be extended as the child grew. There is also a zapiecek – a warming bench used by the sick or elderly. Another room, referred to in Masurian as the grozków, served as the grandparents' quarters, and the pantry stored food and various provisions. The pantry features a 19th-century wooden icebox, which used ice cut from the lake in winter and stored in ice houses until summer.

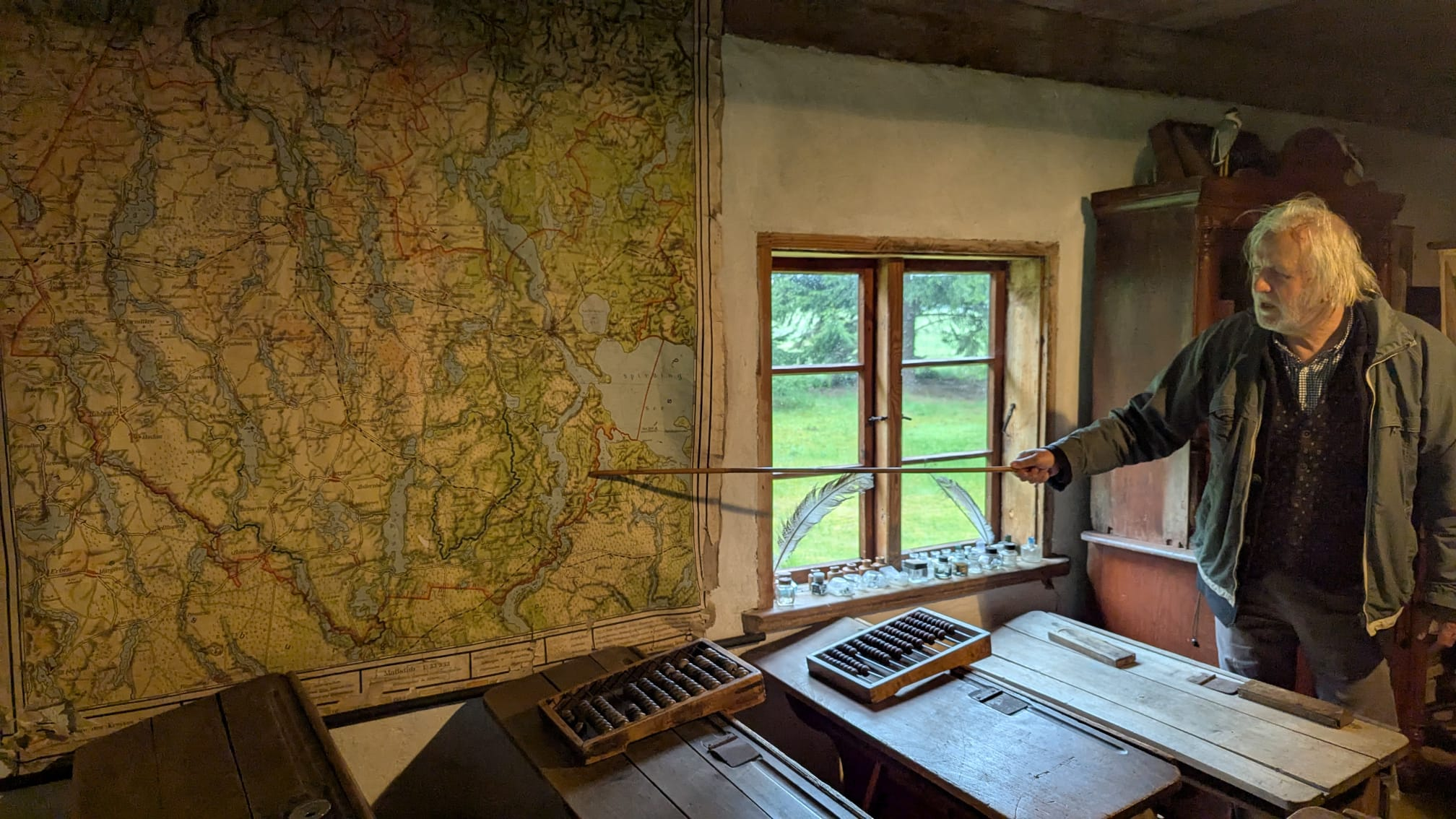
Interior of the reconstructed schoolroom: the "teacher" points to a large classroom map showing Warnowo – the original location of the cottage before its relocation

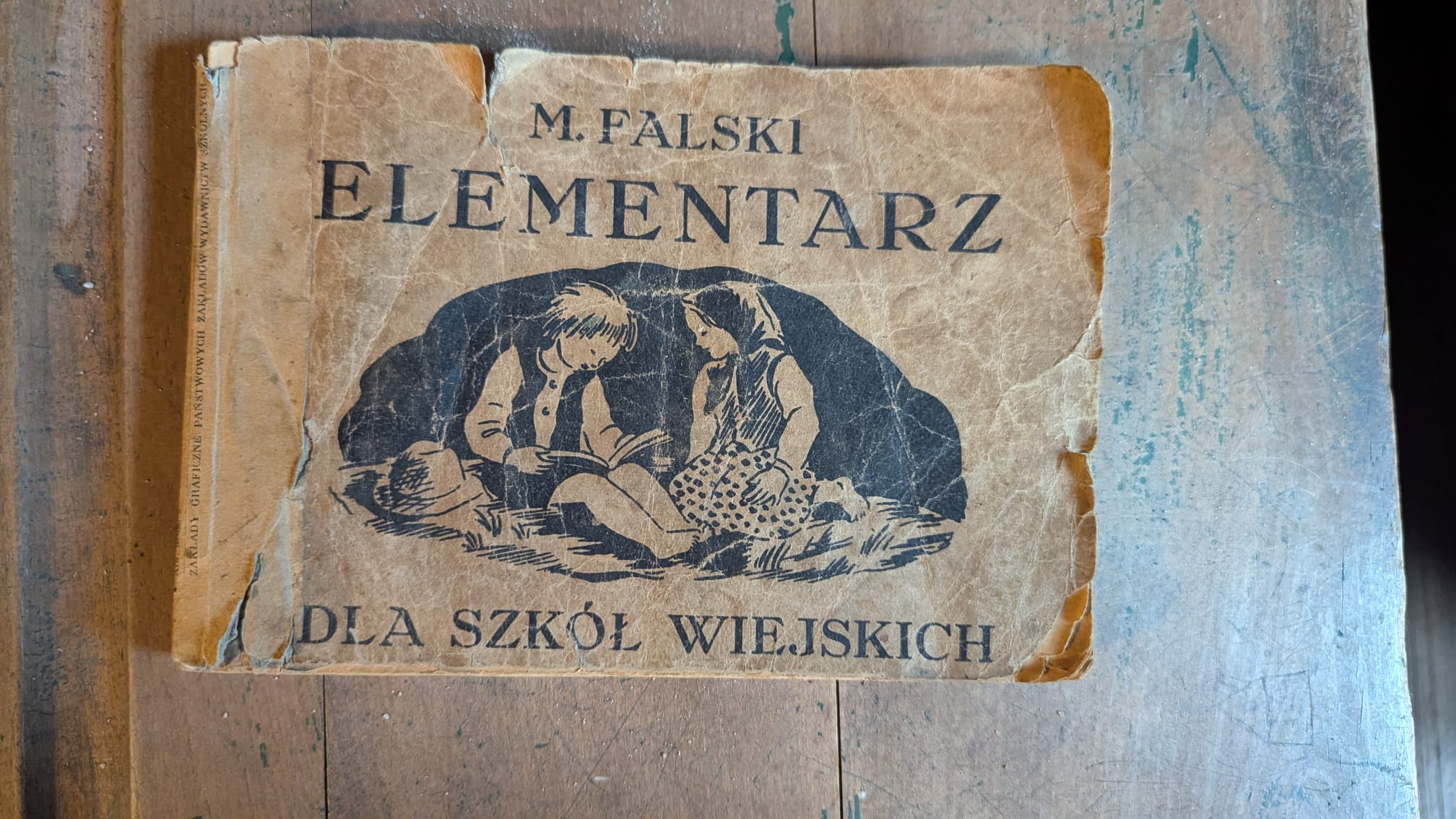
Falski's primer for rural schools

On the left side of the cottage, a one-room rural school from around 1930 has been reconstructed, furnished with original school benches and a blackboard from the elementary school in Ukta. On the wall hangs a large map labeled “Kreis Sensburg” (Mrągowo County), which was used in German schools of that era. The exhibition includes numerous artifacts related to schooling: inkwells, pen holders, pencil cases, slate writing tablets, satchels, abacuses, as well as atlases and textbooks. Among them are the German primer "Lernfreude – Deutsche Schreiblese" by Maximilian Schlegl (Leitmeritz, 1936), and the Polish "Primer" by Marian Falski (Lwów, 1937; reprinted by PZWS, 1946/47). A particularly rare exhibit is the "Toruń Polish Primer with Pictures", intended for children learning in German-language schools. Also on display are elementary school certificates from 1889 and 1900, and gymnasium certificates from 1886/87. Adjacent to the classroom is a small room reconstructed to represent the living quarters of a rural schoolteacher.

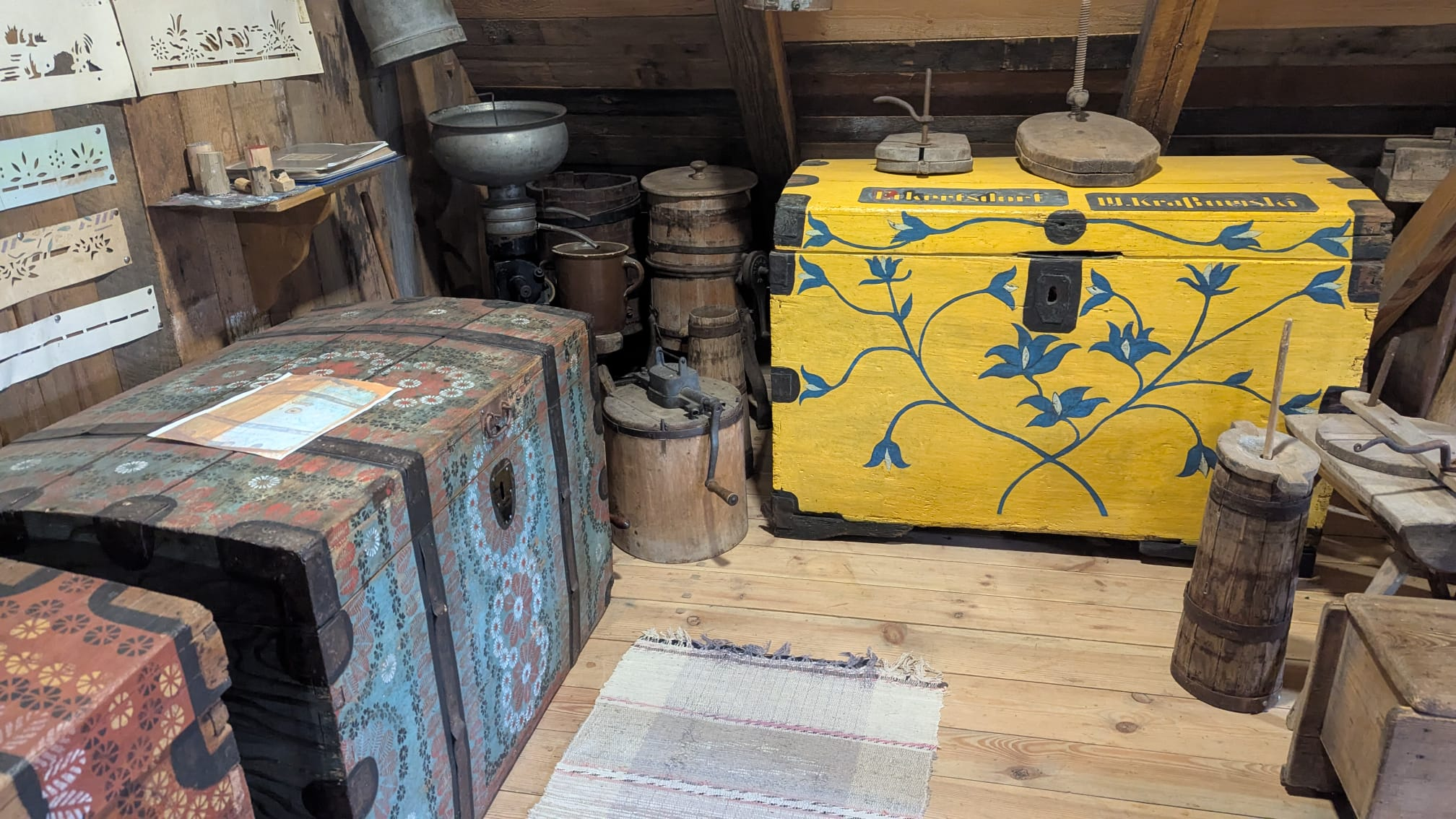
Part of the ethnographic exhibition in the attic – a section of the 38-piece collection of chests and trunks

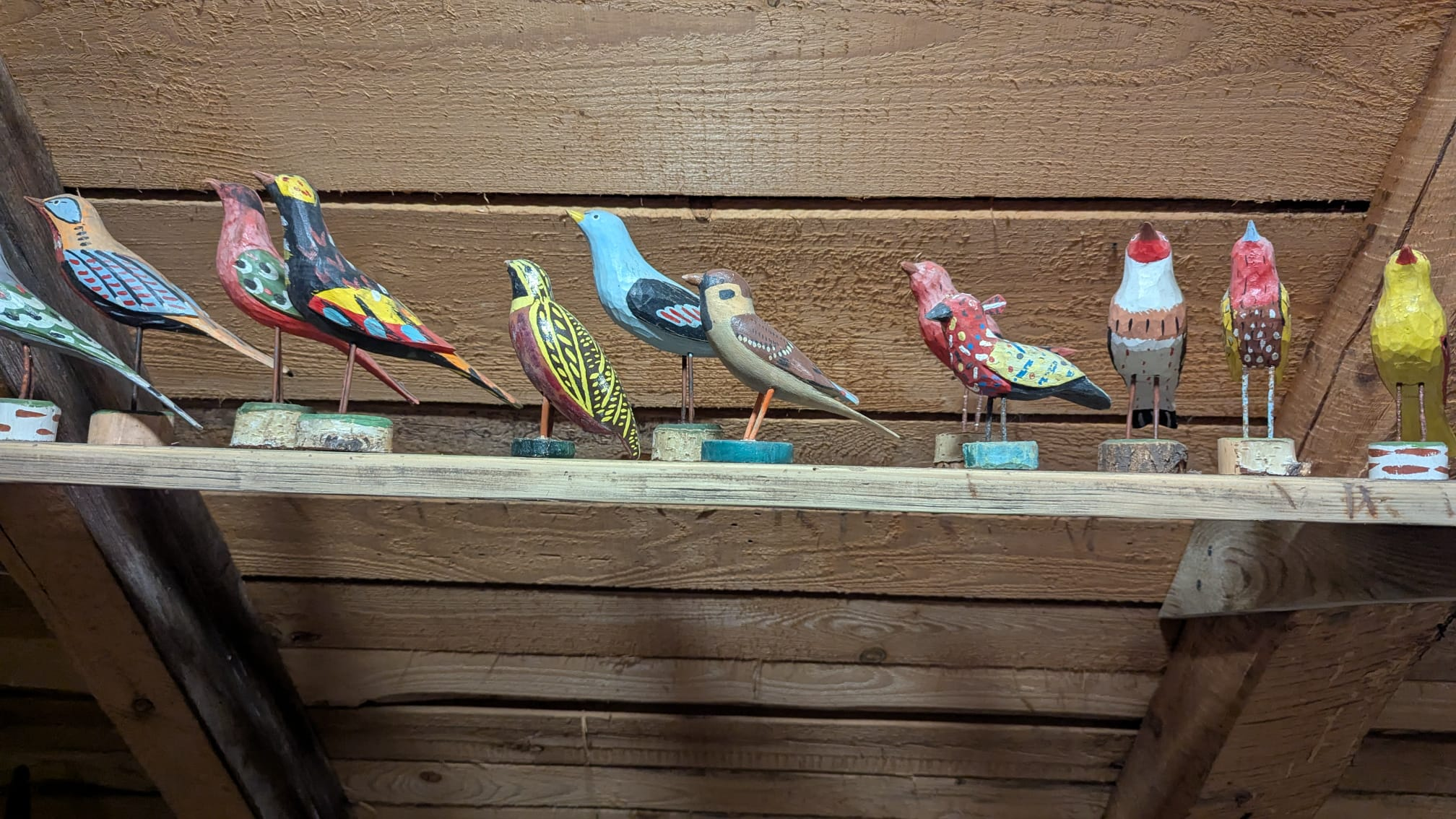
Collection of painted wooden birds by an anonymous folk artist from Masuria

The attic houses the ethnographic section, which contains tools and equipment from traditional rural households, including sickles, mangles, butter churns, and a collection of antique chests and trunks. Also featured is a collection of painted wooden birds created by an anonymous folk artist from Masuria. The collection was acquired from Walentyna Dermacka, founder of a folk art gallery in Piecki. The exhibition presents a rich assortment of everyday objects: a collection of grain mortars used for husking and crushing grain into groats (three goblet-shaped and one log-shaped), as well as various types of wooden troughs, dugouts, barrels, and containers used for preparing and storing food. Also on display are laundry tools, mangling devices, kitchen utensils—including scales, waffle irons, and even mousetraps. A shoemaker's workshop and a weaving room are also part of the exhibition.

The exhibition is complemented by artifacts related to local history — including a collection of items from the 19th-century ironworks in Wądołek, such as cast-iron pots and stove plates; objects from nearby taverns dating to the late 19th and early 20th centuries; and informational boards illustrating the process of relocating the cottage and aspects of traditional wooden architecture.

In the small granary adjacent to the arcaded cottage, items are displayed—mainly hollowed out from tree trunks—used for storing grain and agricultural produce.

== Inn ==
The "Oberża pod Psem" ("The Dog Inn"), operating since 1999, is housed in a cottage over 100 years old, relocated from Dąbrowy (Szczytno County). The inn serves regional dishes prepared from local and organic products sourced from its own farm. Its interior functions as a living museum, decorated with antique everyday objects.
