= Adam Krzemiński =

Polish journalist and commentator

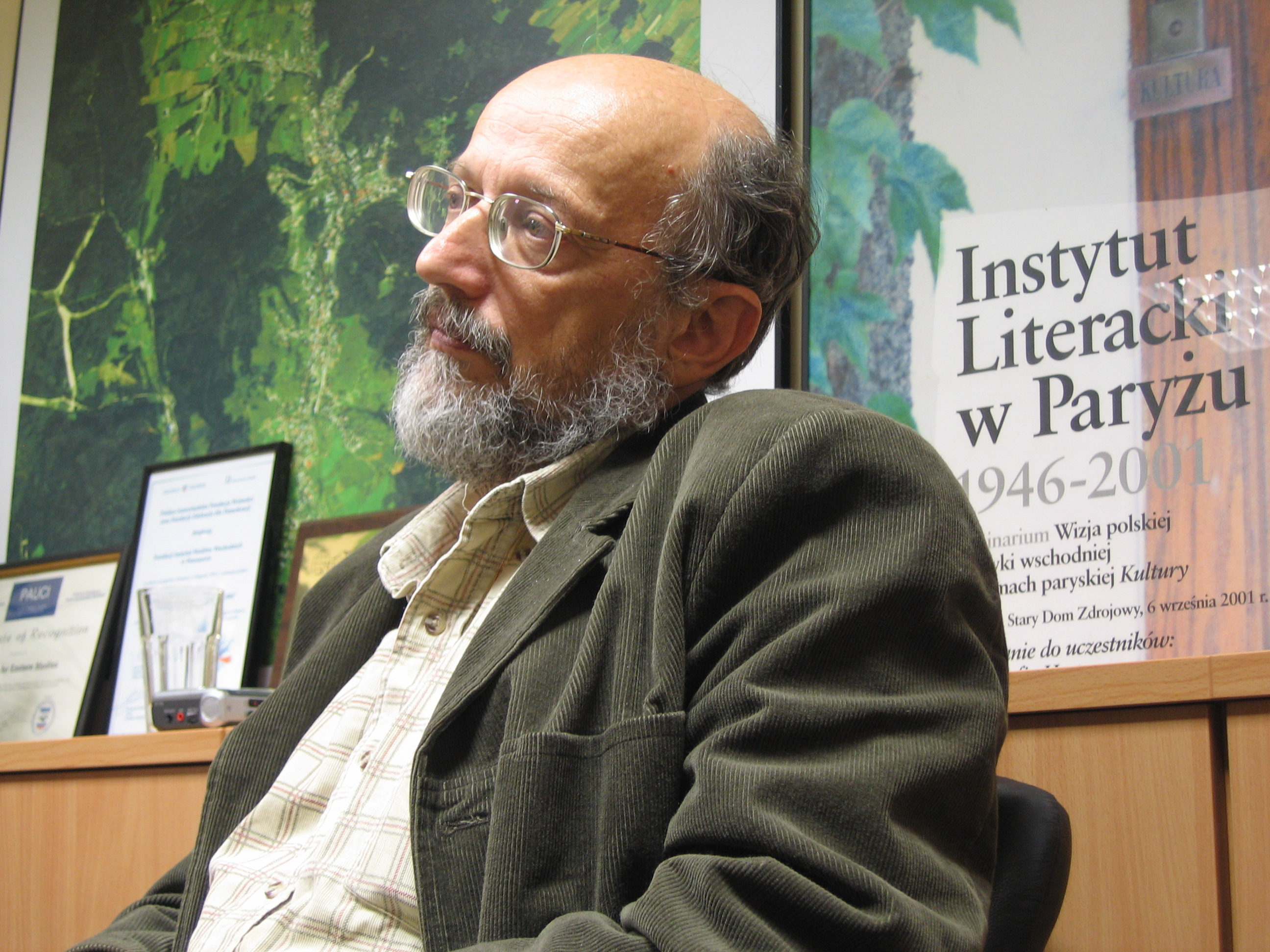
- Krzemiński in Warsaw in 2005
- Born: 27 January 1945 (age 80); Radecznica, Poland
- Occupations: Journalist, commentator

Adam Krzemiński (born 27 January 1945 in Radecznica) is a Polish journalist and commentator, frequently featured on German television and radio, specialized in German-Polish relations and history. Considered "one of the leading publicists of Poland", he has been editor of the Polish weekly Polityka since 1973, has been guest editor of the German weekly Die Zeit and has written for many other international publications. His books include Polen im 20. Jahrhundert: ein historischer Essay (Munich: Beck, 1993).

Krzemiński was awarded the Goethe Medal in 1993 and the Essay Prize of the Polish P.E.N. Club in 1996. Krzeminski is Chairman of the German-Polish Association.
