= Stanisław Sarnicki =

Polish historian (1532–1597)

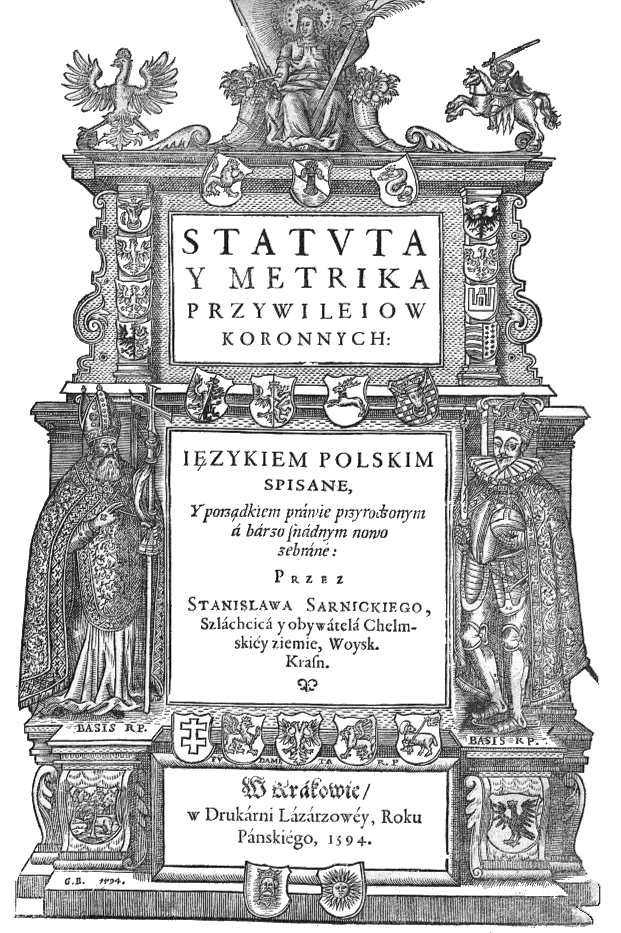
Frontyspis of work Sarnicki Statuta i metryka przywilejów koronnych 1594, published in Kraków

Stanisław Sarnicki (coat of arms: Ślepowron) (1532–1597) was a Polish historian and Calvinist. He lived his life in Mokrelipie, dying there in 1597.

== Personal background ==
During voyages to Europe, Sarnicki was a listener of Philipp Melanchthon in Wittenberg and the teachings of John Calvin in Geneva.

== Published works ==
- Sarnicki, Stanisław (2009) [1585]. Descriptio veteris et novae Poloniae cum divisione eiusdem veteri et nova : adiecta est vera et exquisita Russiae inferioris descriptio, iuxta revisionem commissariorum regiorum ; et Livoniae iuxta odoporicon exercitus Polonici redeuntis ex Moschovia' (in Latin). Kraków: Aleksy Rodecki. p. 88 – via Munich Digitization Center (MDZ).
- Sarnicki, Stanisław Roczniki, czyli o pochodzeniu i sprawach Polaków i Litwinów Ksiąg VIII (Annales, sive de origine et rebus gestis Polonorum et Lithuanorum libri VIII) 1587
- Sarnicki, Stanisław. O początku i o dawnych królach narodu Wandalów to iest Polaków
- Sarnicki, Stanisław. Stanislai Sarnicii Annales sive de origine et rebus gestis Polonorum et Lithuanorum libri octo Cracoviae, 1587
- Sarnicki, Stanisław. Statuta i metryka przywilejów koronnych, Kraków 1594
