= Polany, Lesser Poland Voivodeship =

Polany
- Village
- Former Greek Catholic, currently Roman Catholic church of St.Michael the Archangel

- Location within Poland
- Coordinates: 49°32′N 20°59′E
- Country: Poland
- Voivodeship: Lesser Poland
- County: Nowy Sącz
- Gmina: Krynica-Zdrój

Polany [pɔˈlanɨ] (Note: Lemko Rusyn: Поляны, Poliany) is a village in the administrative district of Gmina Krynica-Zdrój, within Nowy Sącz County, Lesser Poland Voivodeship, in southern Poland, close to the border with Slovakia.
