= Wólka Czarnostocka =

- Village
- Location within Poland
- Coordinates: 50°40′07″N 22°51′04″E
- Country: Poland
- Voivodeship: Lublin
- County: Zamość
- Gmina: Radecznica

Wólka Czarnostocka [ˈvulka t͡ʂarnɔsˈtɔt͡ska] is a village in the administrative district of Gmina Radecznica, within Zamość County, Lublin Voivodeship, in eastern Poland.
