= Podlesie Duże, Lublin Voivodeship =

Podlesie Duże
- Village
- Location within Poland
- Coordinates: 50°45′52″N 22°46′42″E
- Country: Poland
- Voivodeship: Lublin
- County: Zamość
- Gmina: Radecznica

Podlesie Duże [pɔdˈlɛɕɛ ˈduʐɛ] is a village in the administrative district of Gmina Radecznica, within Zamość County, Lublin Voivodeship, in eastern Poland.

Podlesie Structure

The village is located in a cuphole that has unusual features for the area - it is perfectly round, has a flat bottom and a narrow outlet. In 2004, a hypothesis emerged that it may be the remnant of a 4 km (2 mi) diameter meteorite crater created in the Neogene period.
