= Berest =

- Village
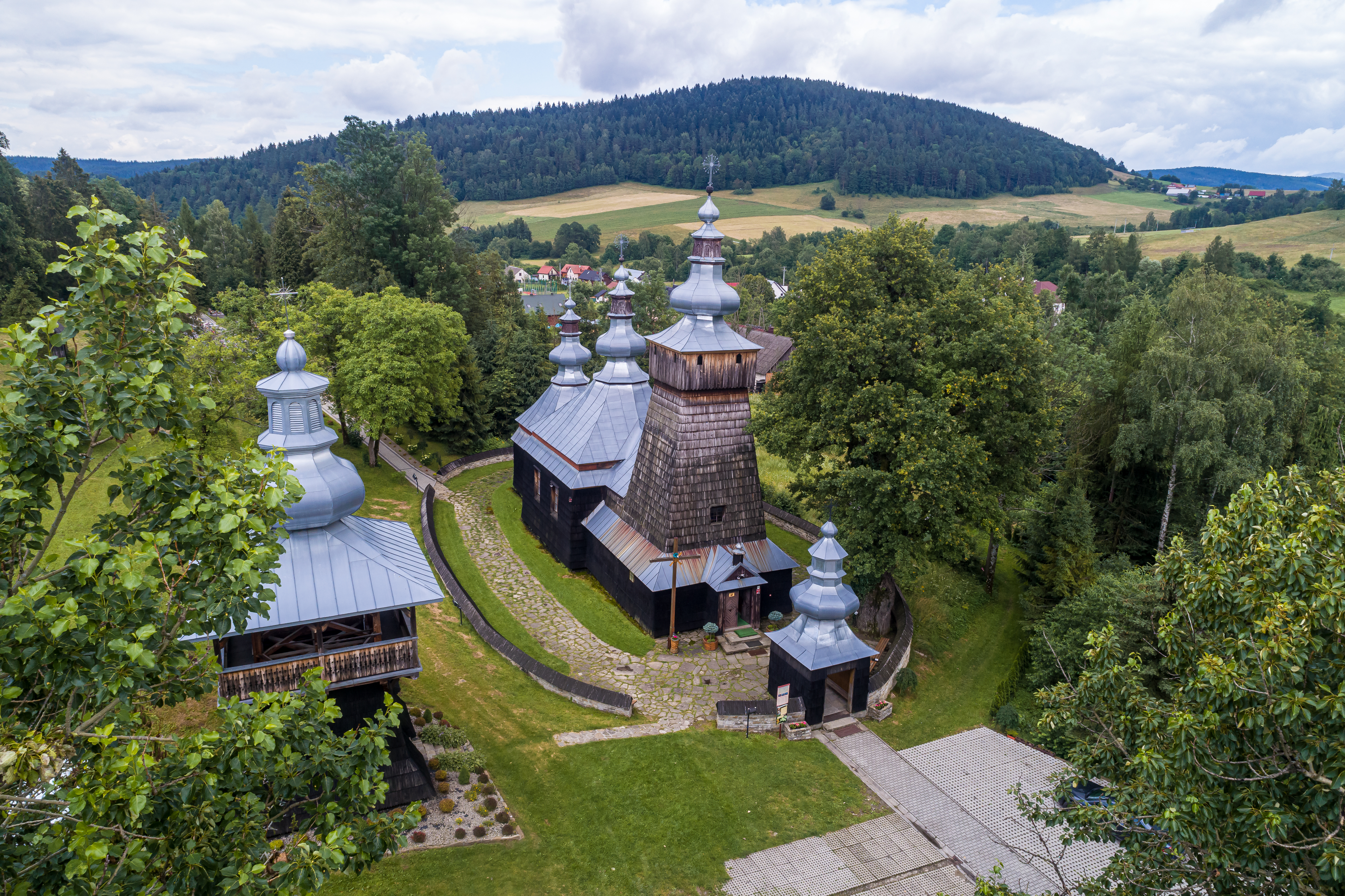
- Greek Catholic church

- Location within Poland
- Coordinates: 49°31′N 20°59′E
- Country: Poland
- Voivodeship: Lesser Poland
- County: Nowy Sącz
- Gmina: Krynica-Zdrój

Berest [ˈbɛrɛst] (Note: Lemko Rusyn: Берест, Berest) is a village in the administrative district of Gmina Krynica-Zdrój, within Nowy Sącz County, Lesser Poland Voivodeship, in southern Poland, close to the border with Slovakia.

Fire station of the Volunteer Fire Department in Berest
