= Gruszka Zaporska =

- Village
- Location within Poland
- Coordinates: 50°47′N 22°50′E
- Country: Poland
- Voivodeship: Lublin
- County: Zamość
- Gmina: Radecznica
- Time zone: UTC+1 (CET)
  - Summer (DST): UTC+2 (CEST)

Gruszka Zaporska [ˈɡruʂka zaˈpɔrska] is a village in the administrative district of Gmina Radecznica, within Zamość County, Lublin Voivodeship, in eastern Poland.

== History ==
Four Polish citizens were murdered by Nazi Germany in the village during World War II.
