= Mochnaczka Wyżna =

- Village
- Location within Poland
- Coordinates: 49°27′N 20°59′E
- Country: Poland
- Voivodeship: Lesser Poland
- County: Nowy Sącz
- Gmina: Krynica-Zdrój
- Population: 520

Mochnaczka Wyżna [mɔxˈnat͡ʂka ˈvɨʐna] is a village in the administrative district of Gmina Krynica-Zdrój, within Nowy Sącz County, Lesser Poland Voivodeship, in southern Poland, close to the border with Slovakia.
