= Mochnaczka Niżna =

- Village
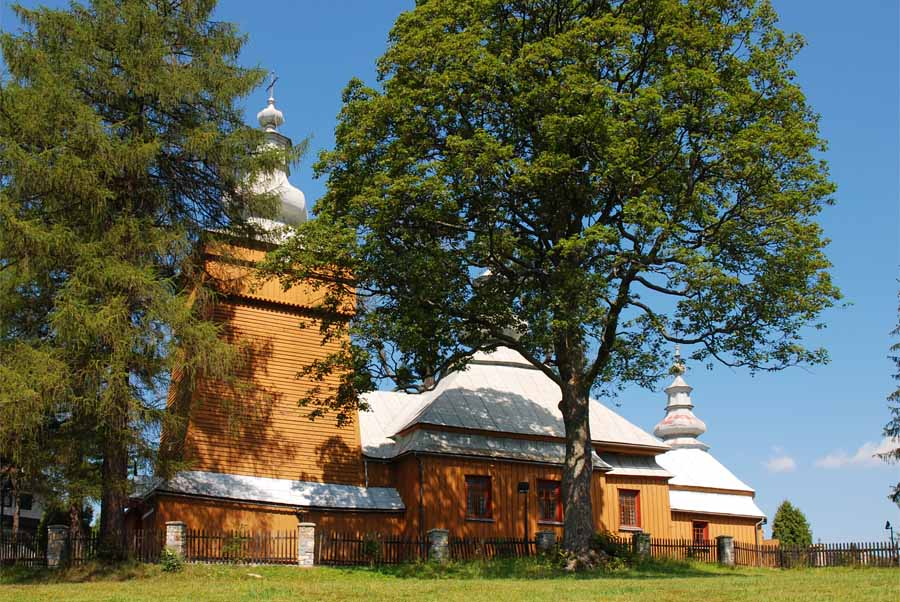
- Greek Catholic church

- Location within Poland
- Coordinates: 49°26′N 21°0′E
- Country: Poland
- Voivodeship: Lesser Poland
- County: Nowy Sącz
- Gmina: Krynica-Zdrój
- Population: 500

Mochnaczka Niżna [mɔxˈnat͡ʂka ˈɲiʐna] is a village in the administrative district of Gmina Krynica-Zdrój, within Nowy Sącz County, Lesser Poland Voivodeship, in southern Poland, close to the border with Slovakia.
