= Czarnystok, Lublin Voivodeship =

Czarnystok
- Village
- Location within Poland
- Coordinates: 50°39′N 22°50′E
- Country: Poland
- Voivodeship: Lublin
- County: Zamość
- Gmina: Radecznica

Czarnystok [t͡ʂarˈnɨstɔk] is a village in the administrative district of Gmina Radecznica, within Zamość County, Lublin Voivodeship, in eastern Poland.
