= Kadzidłowo =

- Village
- Location within Poland
- Coordinates: 53°42′45″N 21°29′17″E
- Country: Poland
- Voivodeship: Warmian-Masurian
- County: Pisz
- Gmina: Ruciane-Nida
- Population: 20

Kadzidłowo [kad͡ʑiˈdwɔvɔ] is a village in the administrative district of Gmina Ruciane-Nida, within Pisz County, Warmian-Masurian Voivodeship, in northern Poland.

Kadzidlowo houses the Open-Air Museum, and Kadzidłowo Wildlife Safari Park.
