= Rena Kornreich Gelissen =

Rena Kornreich Gelissen, born Rena Kornreich (24 August 1920 – 8 August 2006), was a Polish-born Jew, known for her memoir, Rena's Promise: A Story of Sisters in Auschwitz, her story of surviving the Nazi concentration camps with her sister Danka.

== Life ==
"I love, because there is not enough room in my heart to hate.
To hate is to let Hitler win."

— Rena Kornreich Gelissen

In 1920, Rena was born in Lesser Poland Voivodeship of Poland, to Chaim and Sara Kornreich. She had three sisters: Gertrude, Zosia and Danka. She and her sister were raised in Tylicz, but after the Nazi invasion escaped to Slovakia. To protect the people hiding her, she turned herself in to the Nazi authorities and was sent to Auschwitz. She was on the first transport of Jewish women into the concentration camp, on 26 March 1942. There, she was tattooed "1716", being the 716th female to enter the camp (the “1” was the number of the transport, i.e., she was on the first registered transport of women to Auschwitz). Three days later, her sister Danka joined her, where they forged an incredibly strong bond of love and compassion that would help them survive the three years and forty-one days that they would endure in the camp, undergoing hunger, torment and abuse. During these years, Rena and her sister narrowly escaped Nazi experimentation, underwent forced labour and in January 1945, the death march to the Ravensbrück concentration camp.

Rena and Danka were liberated, along with the rest of the camp while they were in Neustadt Glewe, on 2 May 1945. Their parents are believed to have been murdered in Auschwitz and their sister Zosia's fate and her children's is still unknown. Their oldest sister, Gertrude, had emigrated to the United States, in 1921. Liberated, the sisters traveled to the Netherlands and worked for the International Red Cross. On 29 July 1947, Rena married John Gelissen, who was the commander of the Red Cross relief team that had given Rena and her sister food and shelter in 1945. In 1954, Rena and her family immigrated to the United States. In 1951, a few years before, Danka and her husband Elias Brandel had also immigrated to the United States. Neither sister wished to live in cold war Europe or anyplace where they would have to face war or violence again.

Partnered with writer Heather Dune Macadam, Rena told her moving story of surviving the German Nazi concentration camps with her younger sister Danka. The story was made into a book, titled Rena's Promise: A Story of Sisters in Auschwitz, which was published in 1995. The book was well-received, earning her spots in numerous interviews and guest appearances. Rena was the only person from the first transport of Jews into Auschwitz to write her story, which has been called "one of the most historically accurate and important books ever written on the women's camp in Auschwitz I" by Irena Strzelecka, Director, Auschwitz Museum of Women, Oświęcim, Poland.

Rena died in 2006, more than 60 years after her liberation, in Connecticut, at the age of 85. Rena was survived by her daughter, Sylvia and three sons, Joseph, Peter and Robert. She is buried in Bethel, CT. Four years later, in 2010, Rena's husband, John died and was buried next to her. [See footnotes to Kindle edition of Rena's Promise] Her sister, Danka, died November 21, 2012.
