= Gmina Radecznica =

Gmina Radecznica Radecznica Commune
- Gmina
- Coat of arms
- Interactive map of Gmina Radecznica
- Coordinates (Radecznica): 50°45′N 22°50′E
- Country: Poland
- Voivodeship: Lublin
- County: Zamość County
- Seat: Radecznica

Area
  - Total: 109.8 km^{2} (42.4 sq mi)

Population (2013)
  - Total: 6,005
  - Density: 54.69/km^{2} (141.6/sq mi)
- Website: https://gminaradecznica.pl/

Gmina Radecznica is a rural gmina (administrative district) in Zamość County, Lublin Voivodeship, in eastern Poland. Its seat is the village of Radecznica, which lies approximately 31 kilometres (19 mi) west of Zamość and 59 km (37 mi) south of the regional capital Lublin.

The gmina covers an area of 109.8 square kilometres (42.4 sq mi), and as of 2006 its total population is 6,450 (6,005 in 2013).

== Villages ==
Gmina Radecznica contains the villages and settlements of Czarnystok, Dzielce, Gaj Gruszczański, Gorajec-Stara Wieś, Gorajec-Zagroble, Gorajec-Zagroble-Kolonia, Gorajec-Zastawie, Gruszka Zaporska, Latyczyn, Mokrelipie, Podborcze, Podlesie Duże, Podlesie Małe, Radecznica, Trzęsiny, Wólka Czarnostocka, Zaburze, Zakłodzie and Zaporze.

== Neighbouring gminas ==
Gmina Radecznica is bordered by the gminas of Biłgoraj, Frampol, Goraj, Sułów, Szczebrzeszyn, Tereszpol, Turobin and Zwierzyniec.
