= Gmina Krynica-Zdrój =

Gmina Krynica-Zdrój Krynica-Zdrój Commune
- Gmina
- Flag Coat of arms
- Interactive map of Gmina Krynica-Zdrój
- Coordinates (Krynica-Zdrój): 49°24′42″N 20°57′18″E
- Country: Poland
- Voivodeship: Lesser Poland
- County: Nowy Sącz County
- Seat: Krynica-Zdrój

Area
  - Total: 145.3 km^{2} (56.1 sq mi)

Population (2006)
  - Total: 16,850
  - Density: 116.0/km^{2} (300.4/sq mi)
  - Urban: 11,243
  - Rural: 5,607
- Website: http://www.krynica-zdroj.pl

Gmina Krynica-Zdrój is an urban-rural gmina (administrative district) in Nowy Sącz County, Lesser Poland Voivodeship, in southern Poland, on the Slovak border. Its seat is the town of Krynica-Zdrój, which lies approximately 31 kilometres (19 mi) south-east of Nowy Sącz and 103 km (64 mi) south-east of the regional capital Kraków.

The gmina covers an area of 145.3 square kilometres (56.1 sq mi), and as of 2006 its total population is 16,850 (out of which the population of Krynica-Zdrój amounts to 11,243, and the population of the rural part of the gmina is 5,607).

== Villages ==
Apart from the town of Krynica-Zdrój, Gmina Krynica-Zdrój contains the villages and settlements of Berest, Czyrna, Mochnaczka Niżna, Mochnaczka Wyżna, Muszynka, Piorunka, Polany and Tylicz.

== Neighbouring gminas ==
Gmina Krynica-Zdrój is bordered by the gminas of Grybów, Łabowa, Muszyna and Uście Gorlickie. It also borders Slovakia.

== Bibliography ==
- Polish official population figures 2006
