= Gorajec-Zagroble-Kolonia =

- Settlement
- Location within Poland
- Coordinates: 50°41′29″N 22°52′26″E
- Country: Poland
- Voivodeship: Lublin
- County: Zamość
- Gmina: Radecznica

Gorajec-Zagroble-Kolonia [ɡɔˈrajɛt͡s zaˈɡrɔblɛ kɔˈlɔɲa] is a settlement in the administrative district of Gmina Radecznica, within Zamość County, Lublin Voivodeship, in eastern Poland.
