= Podlesie Małe =

- Village
- Location within Poland
- Coordinates: 50°45′37″N 22°47′28″E
- Country: Poland
- Voivodeship: Lublin
- County: Zamość
- Gmina: Radecznica

Podlesie Małe [pɔdˈlɛɕɛ ˈmawɛ] is a village in the administrative district of Gmina Radecznica, within Zamość County, Lublin Voivodeship, in eastern Poland.
