= Dzielce =

- Village
- Location within Poland
- Coordinates: 50°42′N 22°52′E
- Country: Poland
- Voivodeship: Lublin
- County: Zamość
- Gmina: Radecznica

Dzielce [ˈd͡ʑɛlt͡sɛ] is a village in the administrative district of Gmina Radecznica, within Zamość County, Lublin Voivodeship, in eastern Poland.
