= Tylicz =

- Village
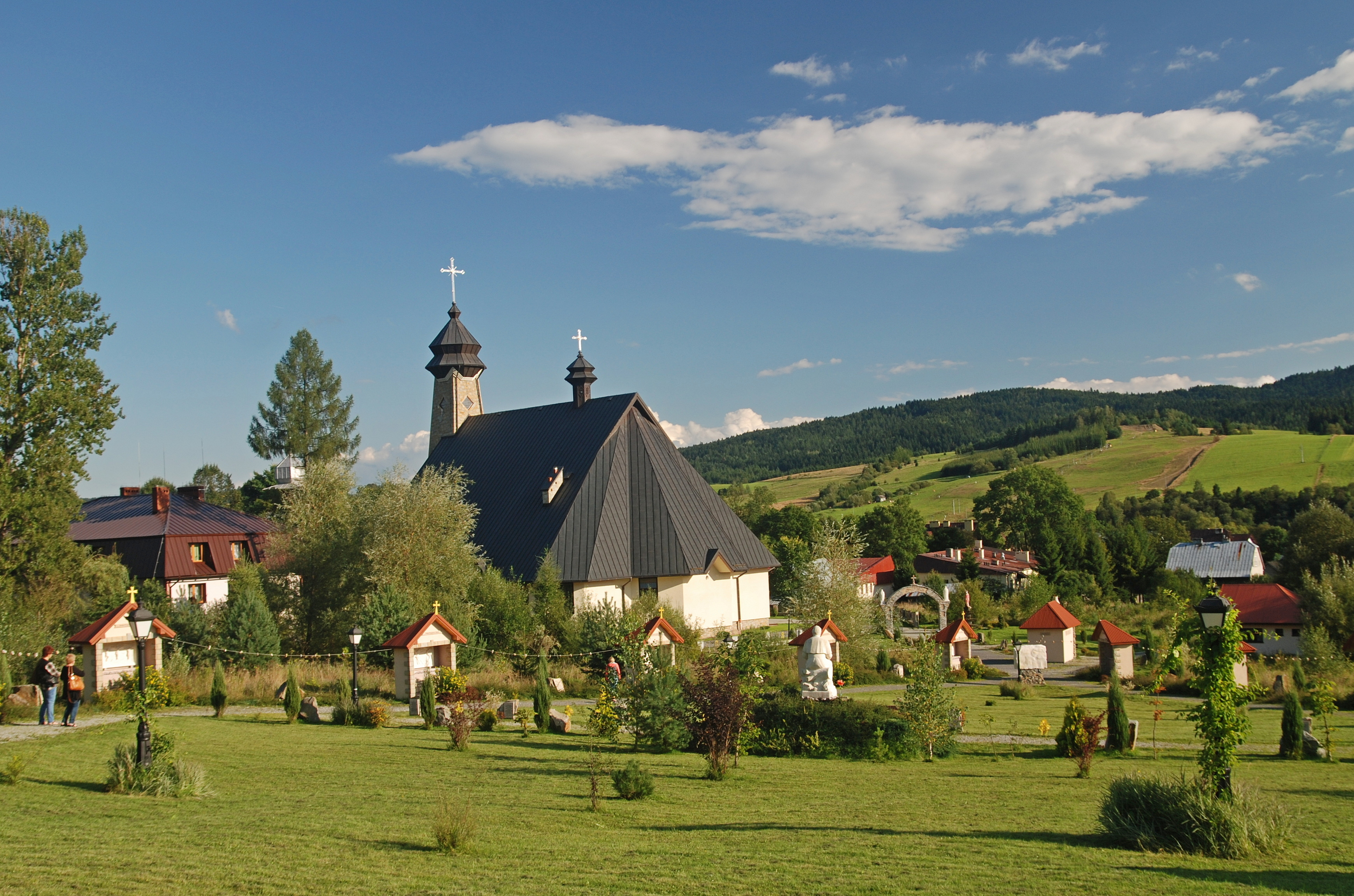
- View of the town and Tatra Mountains

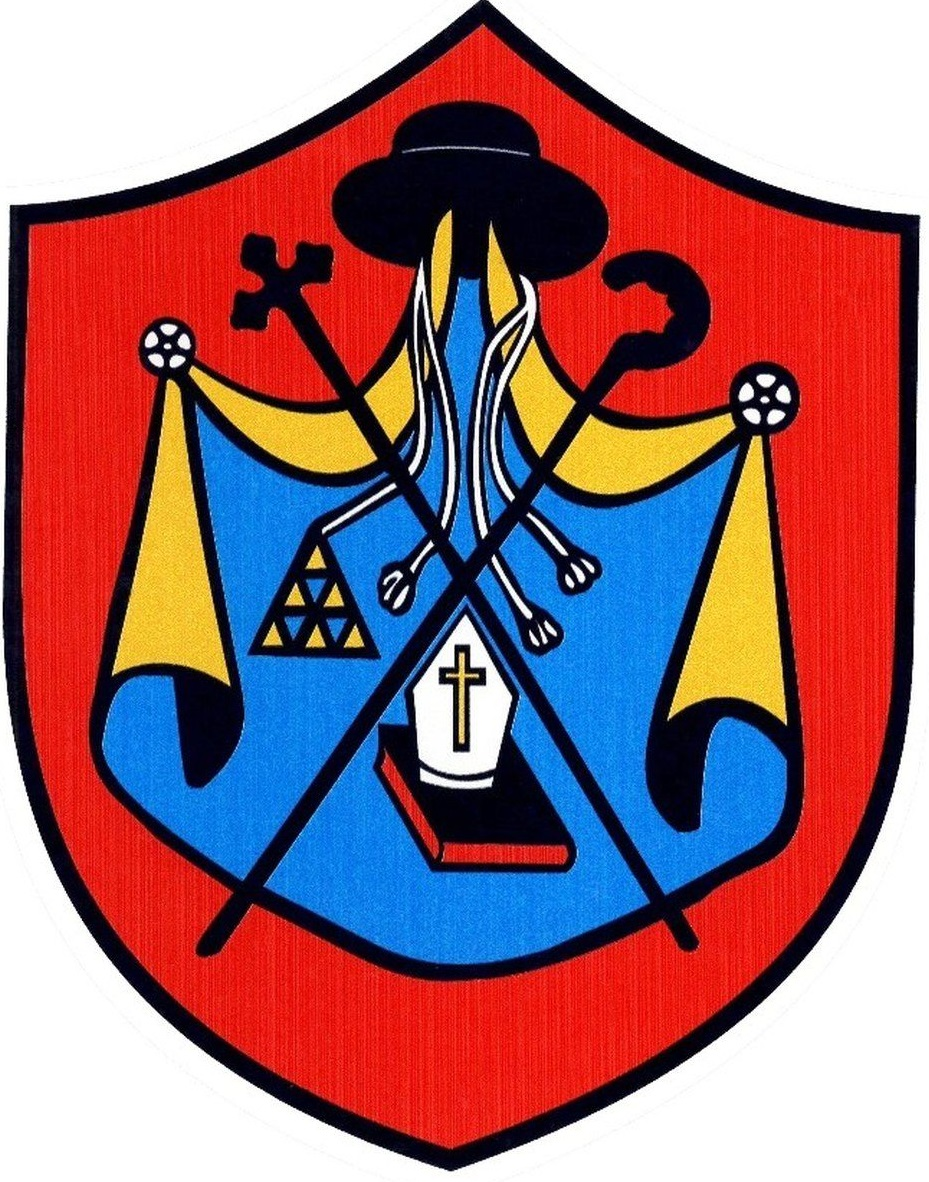
- Coat of arms

- Location within Poland
- Coordinates: 49°24′N 21°2′E
- Country: Poland
- Voivodeship: Lesser Poland
- County: Nowy Sącz
- Gmina: Krynica-Zdrój
- Population: 1,800

Tylicz [ˈtɨlʲit͡ʂ] is a village in the administrative district of Gmina Krynica-Zdrój, within Nowy Sącz County, Lesser Poland Voivodeship, in southern Poland, close to the border with Slovakia.

== History ==
The history of Tylicz dates back to the 13th century, when a settlement called Ornamentum was founded along merchant trail from Poland to Hungary. At that time, Tylicz was also called Oppidium Novum and Ornawa, and was an important garrison of Polish royal army, which guarded southern border of the kingdom. Furthermore, Ornamentum/Ornawa was home to royal courts and councils of local nobility.

In 1363, king Casimir III the Great, who promoted settlement in this sparsely populated corner of Poland, granted Magdeburg rights to Ornawa, changing its name into Miastko. Furthermore, the king founded a parish church together with a school. Soon afterwards, a defensive wall was built. Miastko had its own court, and the right to stock merchant products, which provided it with revenue.

In 1391, king Jogaila (Władysław II Jagiełło) handed Miastko together with nearby Muszyna to Bishop of Kraków, Jan Radlica. In a document, issued by Jogaila for this occasion, Tylicz/Miastko was named Ornamentum and Novum Oppidium, and the town remained part of the vast bishophoric Muszyna Estate until the first partition of Poland (1772). In 1474, Tylicz and whole southern Lesser Poland was affected by a disastrous Hungarian raid of King Matthias Corvinus. The destruction was so severe that in a 1529 document called Liber retaxatiorum, Tylicz/Miastko was called a village. A royal castle probably stood nearby, but its location has not been establishes.

In 1612, Bishop of Kraków Piotr Tylicki regranted town charter to Miastko. He also gave it a coat of arms and several privileges, also founding a new parish church and school. To honor this, residents of Miastko changed the name of the town into Tylicz. Bishop Tylicki ordered construction of new homes, located at distances from each other, to prevent fires. Tylicz prospered, becoming sixth largest town of Nowy Sącz County of Kraków Voivodeship, after Nowy Sącz, Stary Sącz, Muszyna, and Nowy Targ.

The period of relative prosperity ended in the mid-17th century, when Nowy Sącz County was suffered widespread destruction during Swedish invasion of Poland. In October 1683, Crown Hetman Stanisław Jabłonowski camped with his army in Tylicz, after the victorious Battle of Vienna. In the 1760s, the area of Tylicz became a base of the Bar Confederation. Several battles and skirmishes took place here, including the Battle of Lackowa (June 3/4, 1770), in which Polish army under Casimir Pulaski fought Russians commanded by General Ivan Drevich.

Following the Partitions of Poland, Tylicz was annexed by the Habsburg Empire, and remained in Austrian Galicia until November 1918. During Austrian rule, the town declined and lost its importance, at the expense of nearby spa of Krynica-Zdrój, which rapidly grew since the late 19th century. Furthermore, construction of railroads missed Tylicz, which contributed to its decline. In 1930, several houses in the market square burned.

After World War II, Tylicz was the seat of a separate gmina, but in 1952, it was moved to Krynica-Zdrój, where it still remains.

Notable natives include Rena Kornreich Gelissen, author and survivor of Nazi concentration camps and her sister Danka Kornreich Brandel.
