= Gorajec-Stara Wieś =

- Village
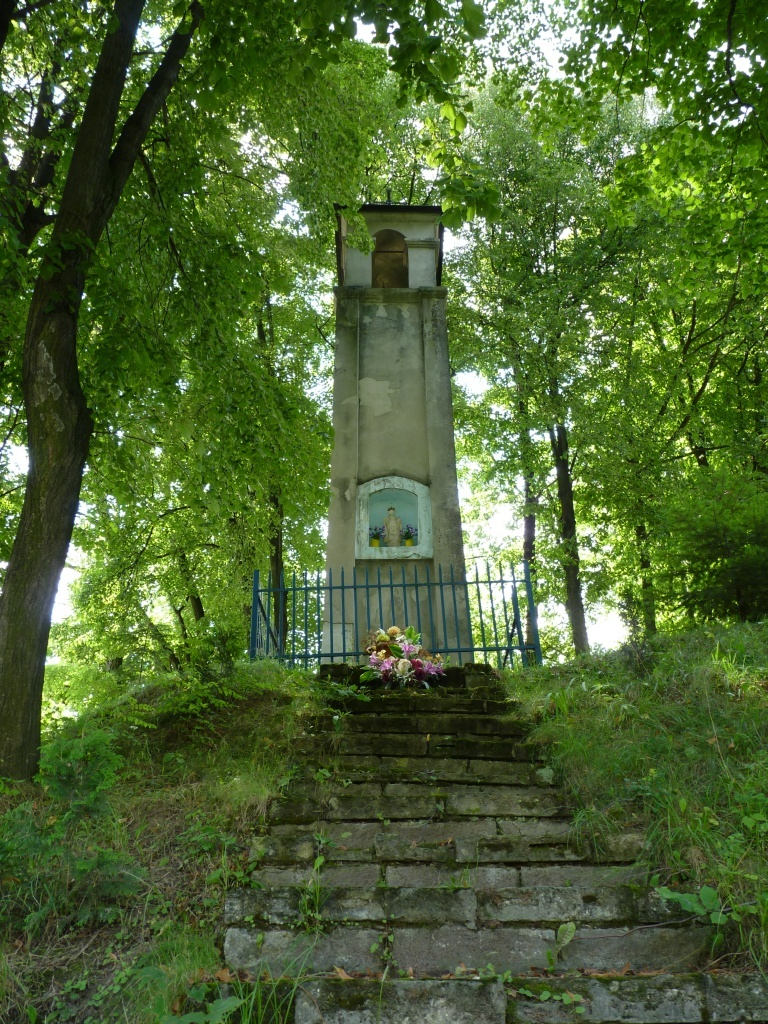
- Altar in Gorajec-Stara Wieś

- Location within Poland
- Coordinates: 50°41′01″N 22°50′39″E
- Country: Poland
- Voivodeship: Lublin
- County: Zamość
- Gmina: Radecznica

Gorajec-Stara Wieś [ɡɔˈrajɛt͡s ˈstara ˈvjɛɕ] is a village in the administrative district of Gmina Radecznica, within Zamość County, Lublin Voivodeship, in eastern Poland.
