= Trzęsiny =

- Village
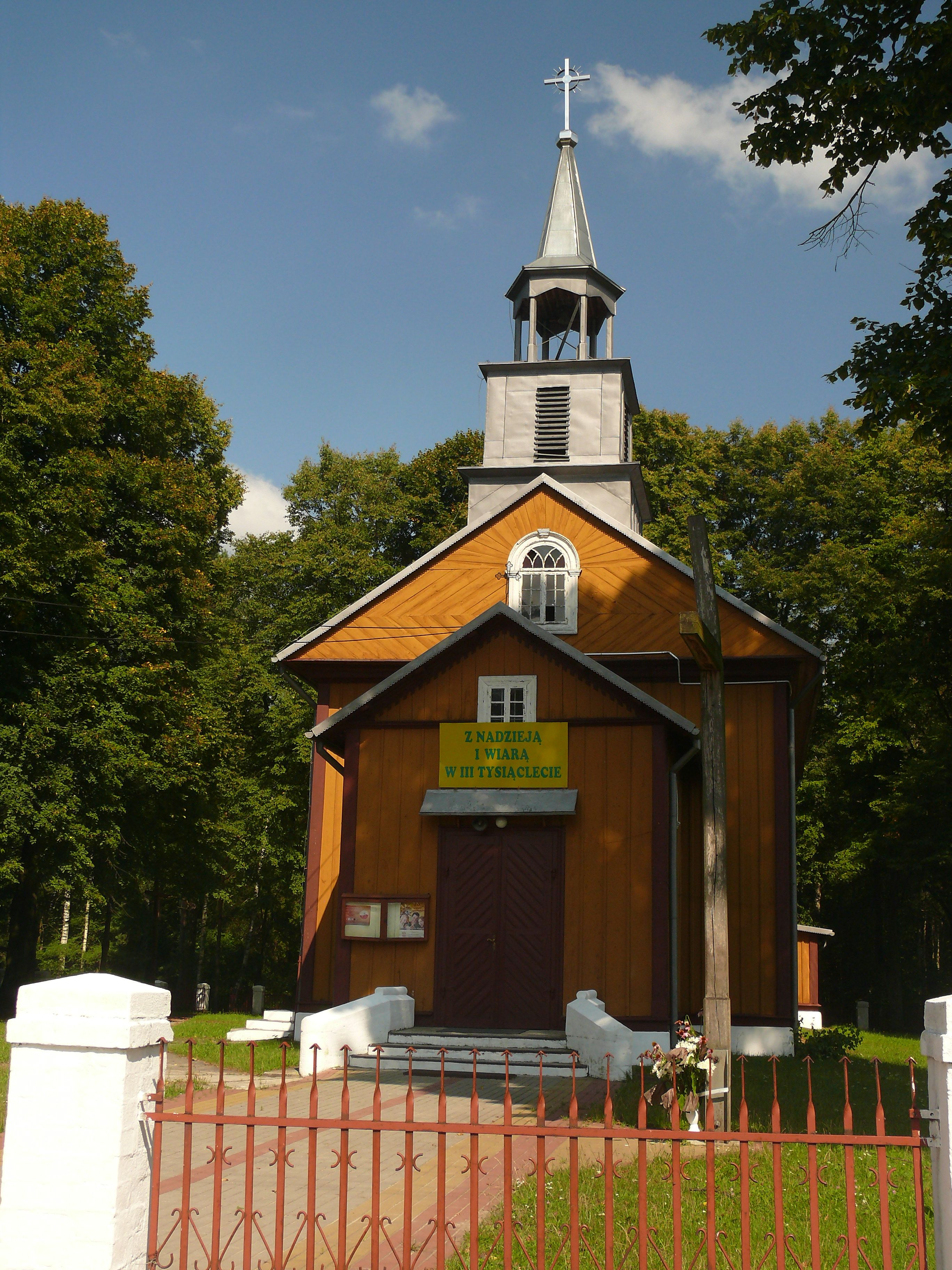
- Church in Trzęsiny

- Location within Poland
- Coordinates: 50°38′N 22°48′E
- Country: Poland
- Voivodeship: Lublin
- County: Zamość
- Gmina: Radecznica
- Population: 104 (2,011)

Trzęsiny [tʂɛ̃ˈɕinɨ] is a village in the administrative district of Gmina Radecznica, within Zamość County, Lublin Voivodeship, in eastern Poland.
