= Muszynka =

- Village
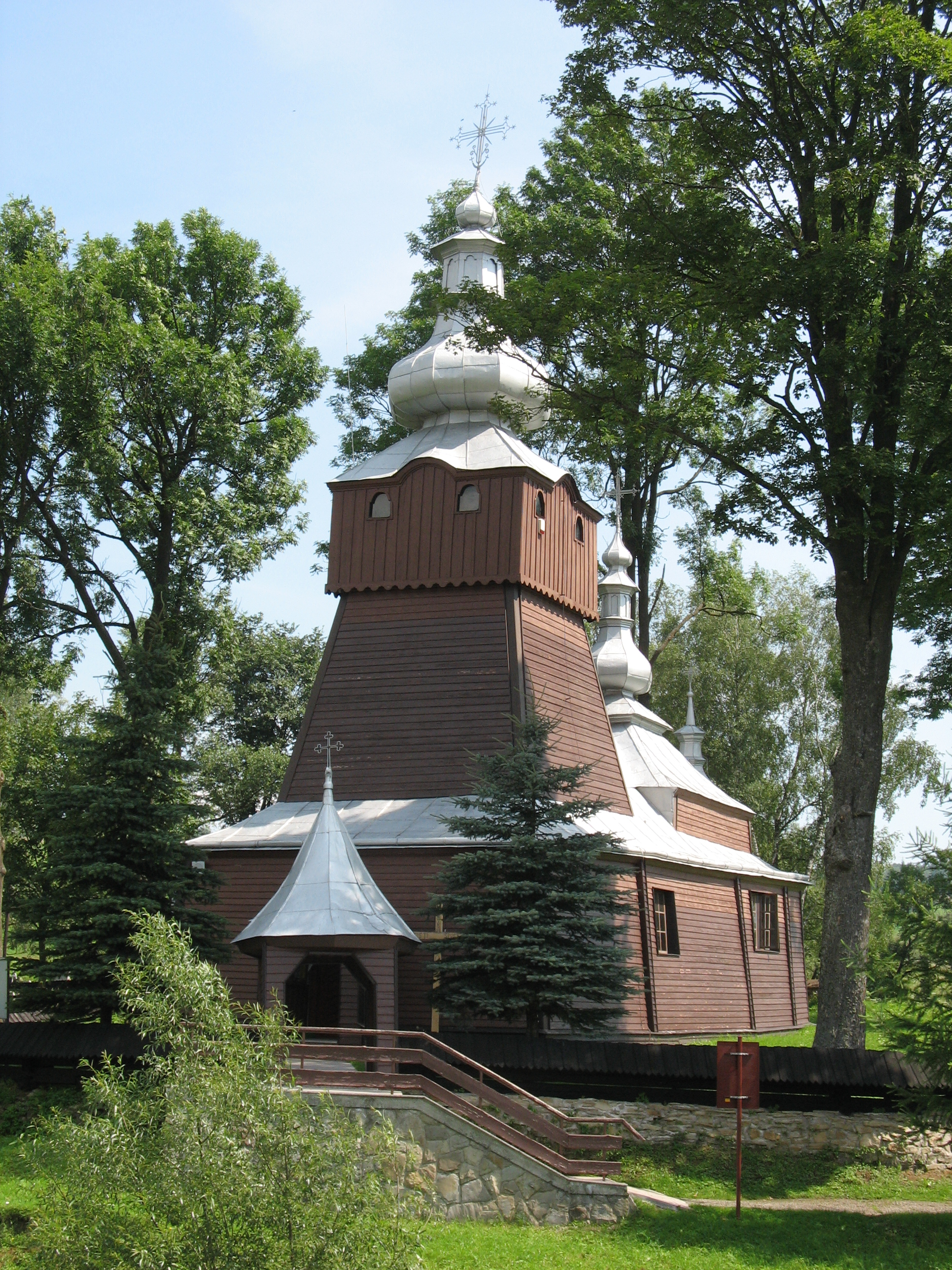
- Saint John the Evangelist Church

- Location within Poland
- Coordinates: 49°23′N 21°3′E
- Country: Poland
- Voivodeship: Lesser Poland
- County: Nowy Sącz
- Gmina: Krynica-Zdrój
- Population: 410

Muszynka [muˈʂɨŋka] is a village in the administrative district of Gmina Krynica-Zdrój, within Nowy Sącz County, Lesser Poland Voivodeship, in southern Poland, close to the border with Slovakia.
