= Gorajec-Zastawie =

- Village
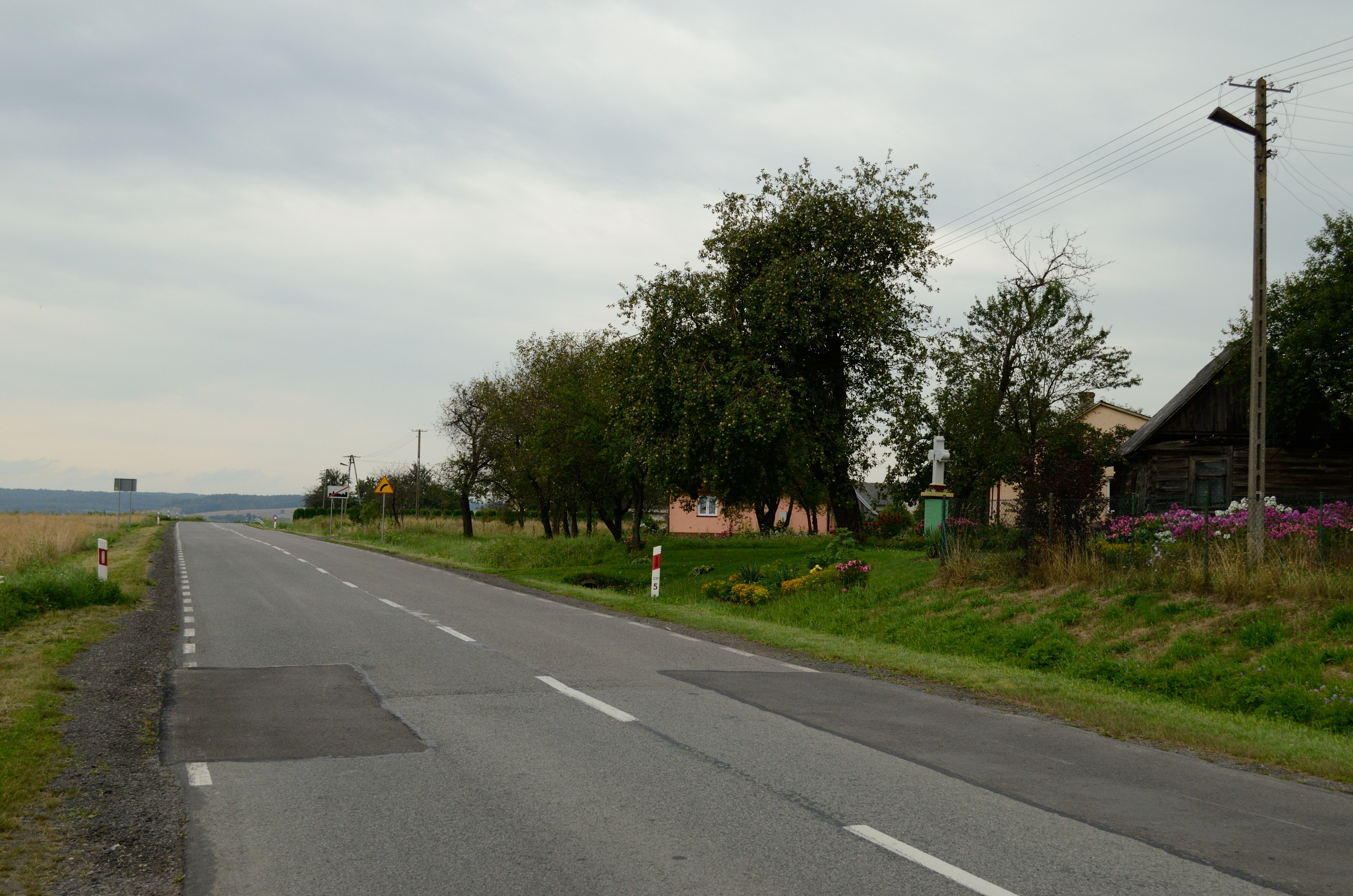
- Road in Gorajec-Zastawie

- Location within Poland
- Coordinates: 50°40′36″N 22°50′00″E
- Country: Poland
- Voivodeship: Lublin
- County: Zamość
- Gmina: Radecznica

Gorajec-Zastawie [ɡɔˈrajɛt͡s zasˈtavjɛ] is a village in the administrative district of Gmina Radecznica, within Zamość County, Lublin Voivodeship, in eastern Poland.
