= Rozogi, Mrągowo County =

Rozogi
- Village
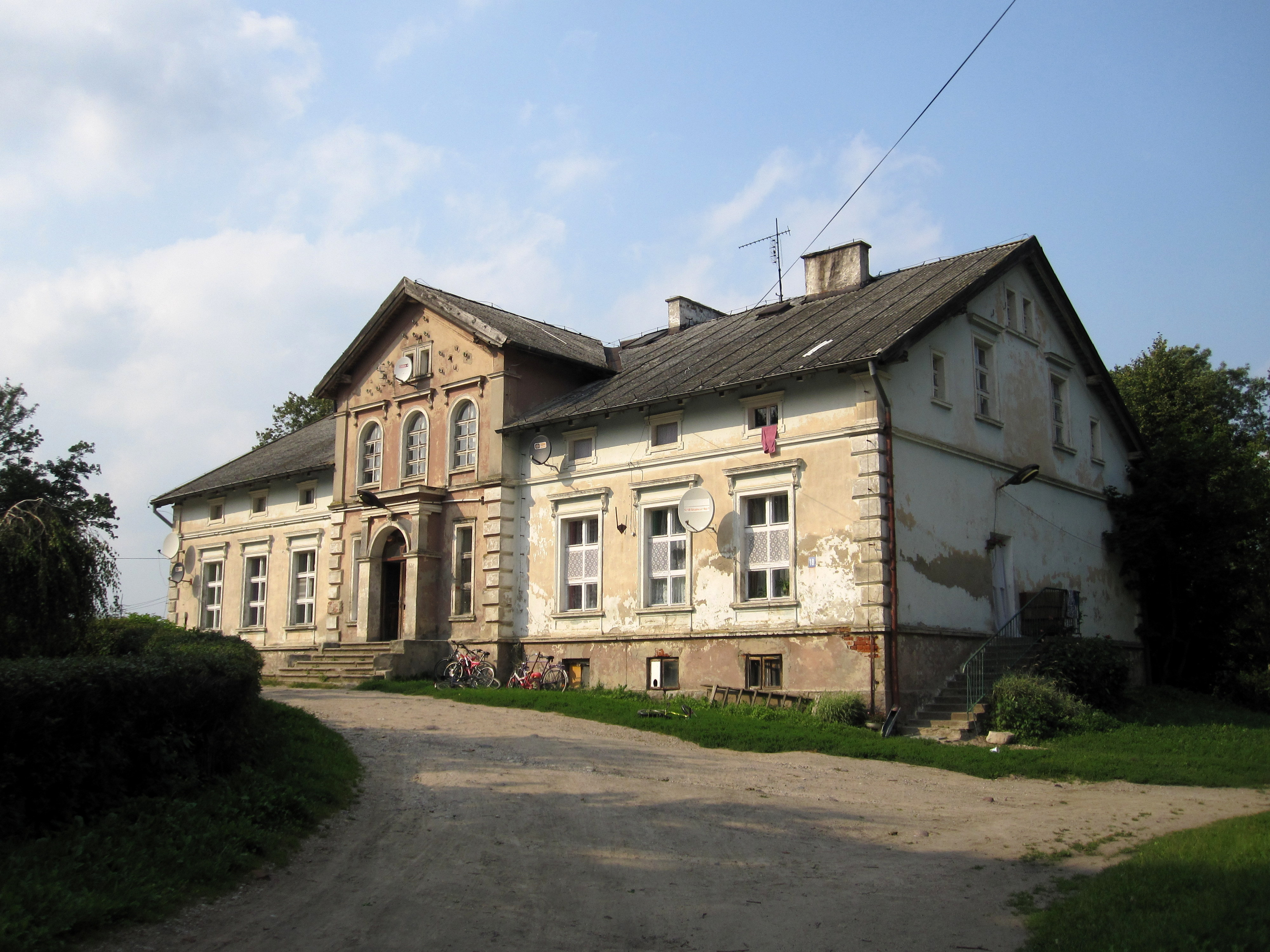
- Manor in the village

- Location within Poland
- Coordinates: 53°47′30″N 21°7′42″E
- Country: Poland
- Voivodeship: Warmian-Masurian
- County: Mrągowo
- Gmina: Sorkwity

Population
  - Total: 210

Rozogi [rɔˈzɔɡi] is a village in the administrative district of Gmina Sorkwity, within Mrągowo County, Warmian-Masurian Voivodeship, in northern Poland.
