= Mokrelipie =

- Village
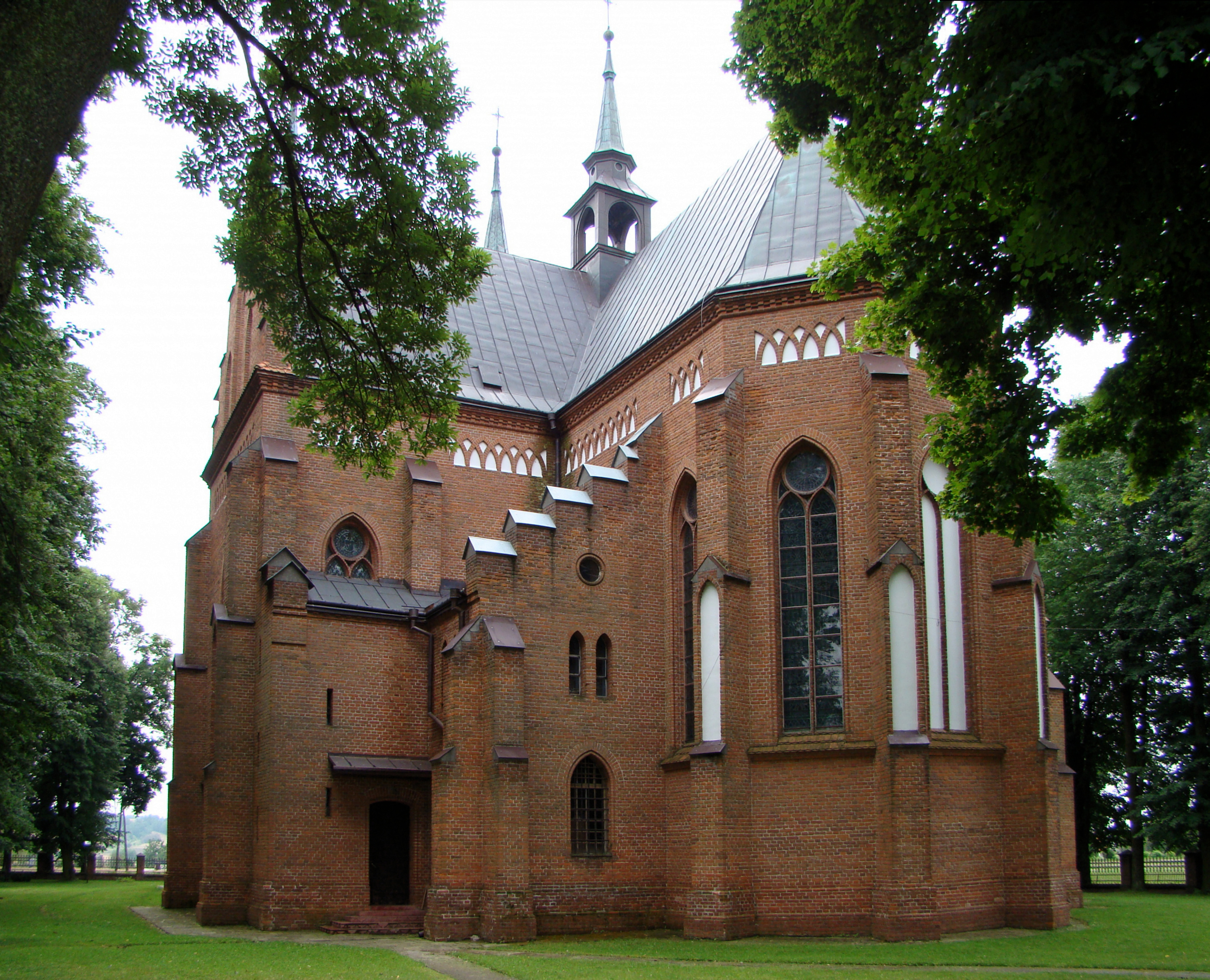
- Invention of the Holy Cross church in Mokrelipie

- Location within Poland
- Coordinates: 50°45′N 22°52′E
- Country: Poland
- Voivodeship: Lublin
- County: Zamość
- Gmina: Radecznica
- Time zone: UTC+1 (CET)
  - Summer (DST): UTC+2 (CEST)

Mokrelipie [mɔkrɛˈlipjɛ] is a village in the administrative district of Gmina Radecznica, within Zamość County, Lublin Voivodeship, in eastern Poland.

== History ==
Seven Polish citizens were murdered by Nazi Germany in the village during World War II.
