= Radecznica =

- Village
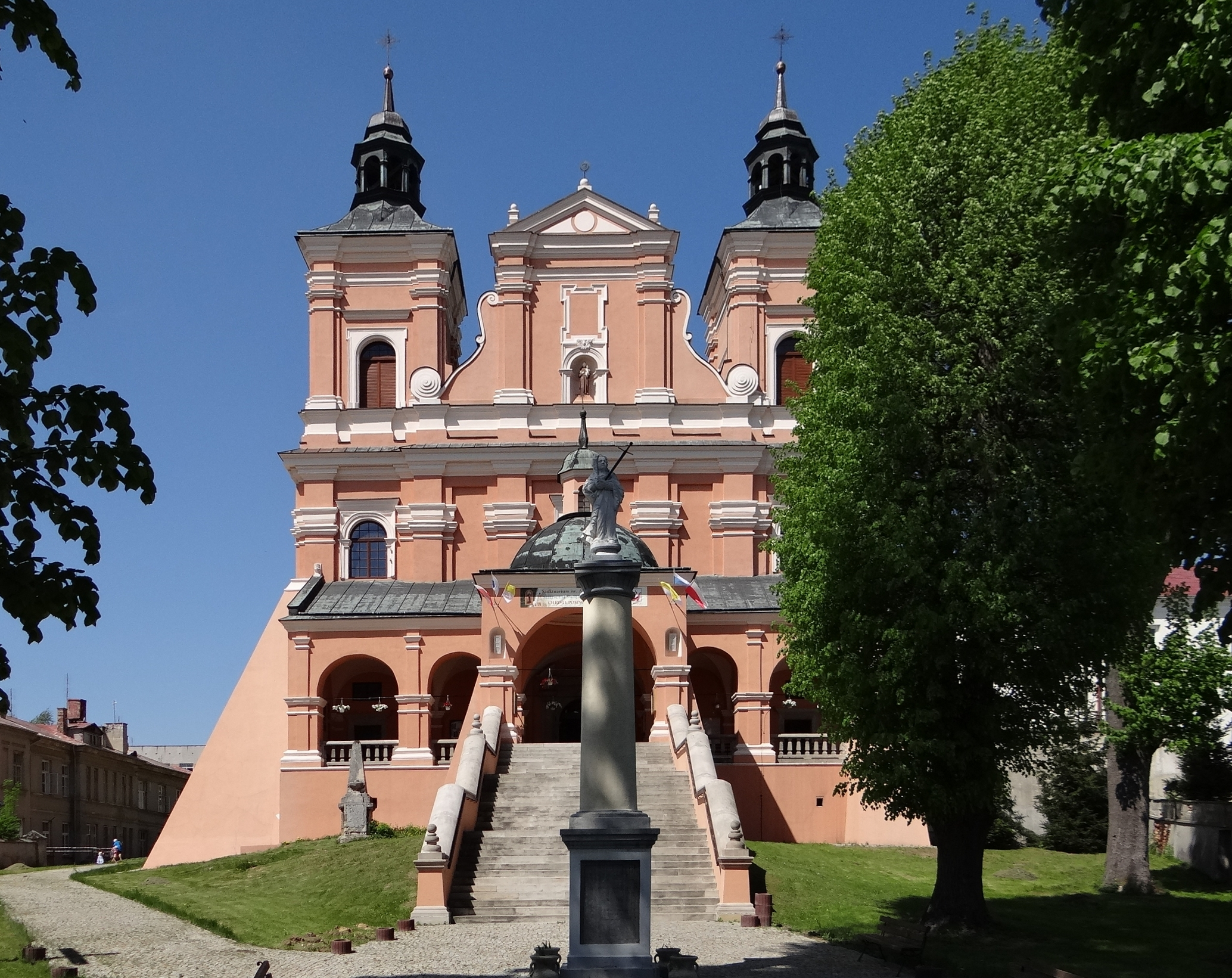
- Basilica of Saint Anthony of Padua

- Location within Poland
- Coordinates: 50°45′N 22°50′E
- Country: Poland
- Voivodeship: Lublin
- County: Zamość
- Gmina: Radecznica

Population (approx.)
  - Total: 920

Radecznica [radɛt͡ʂˈnit͡sa] is a village in Zamość County, Lublin Voivodeship, in eastern Poland. It is the seat of the gmina (administrative district) called Gmina Radecznica.
