= Kerttu Tamminen =

Finnish architect (1898-1981)

- Born: 10 October 1898; Polyany
- Died: 16 July 1981 (aged 82); Helsinki
- Occupation: Architect
- Buildings: Kirkkopuisto park

Kerttu Tamminen (10 October 1898 – 16 July 1981) was a Finnish architect. She was the main designer of the Kirkkopuisto park in 1931 to 1935.

== Details ==
She graduated from University of Jyväskylä and was hired as a designer and architect for the reconstruction of the Kirkkopuisto. The park and the square and the streets around it were completed in 1935.

Originally, the current Kirkkopuisto was a large market square. Historical documents indicate that in 1837, in the middle of this large market, a place was considered for the construction of a church, which was completed only in 1880 after several stages. In 1931, Pauli E. Blomstedt and Kerttu Tamminen were invited to present proposals for the future expression of Kirkkopuisto.
