= Katajanokka Terminal =

Ferry terminal in Helsinki, Finland

- Katajanokan terminaali
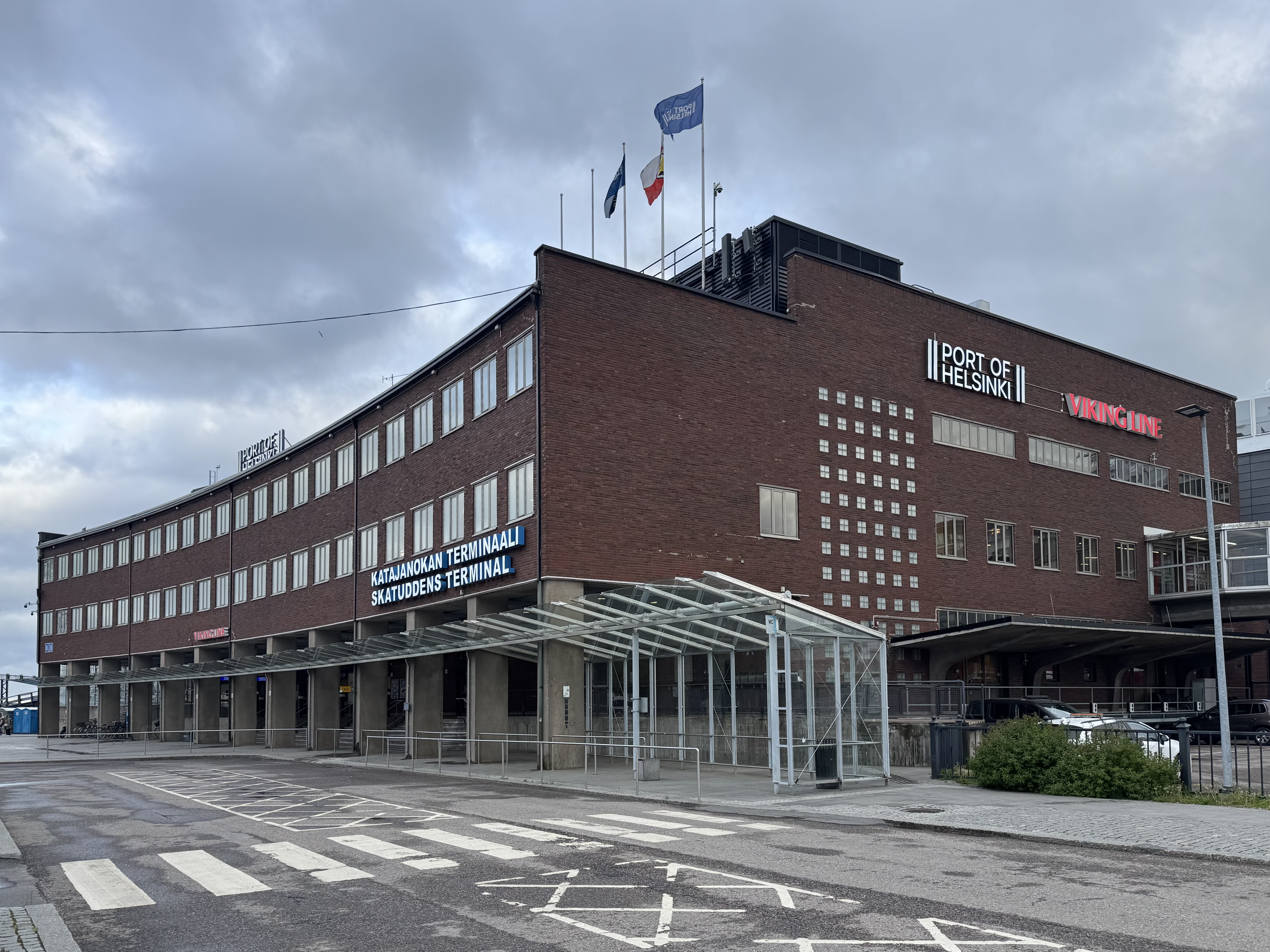
- Katajanokka Terminal in 2026
- Interactive map of the Katajanokka Terminal area

General information
- Status: In use
- Type: Ferry terminal
- Location: Katajanokka, Helsinki, Finland
- Coordinates: 60°09′59″N 24°57′42″E
- Completed: 1937
- Opening: 1977 (as passenger terminal)
- Owner: Port of Helsinki
- Operator: Viking Line

Design and construction
- Architects: Gunnar Taucher (original), Kari Unelius (1977 conversion), Ari Bungers (2008 expansion)

Other information
- Public transit access: Helsinki tram lines 4 and 5

Website
- https://www.portofhelsinki.fi/en/

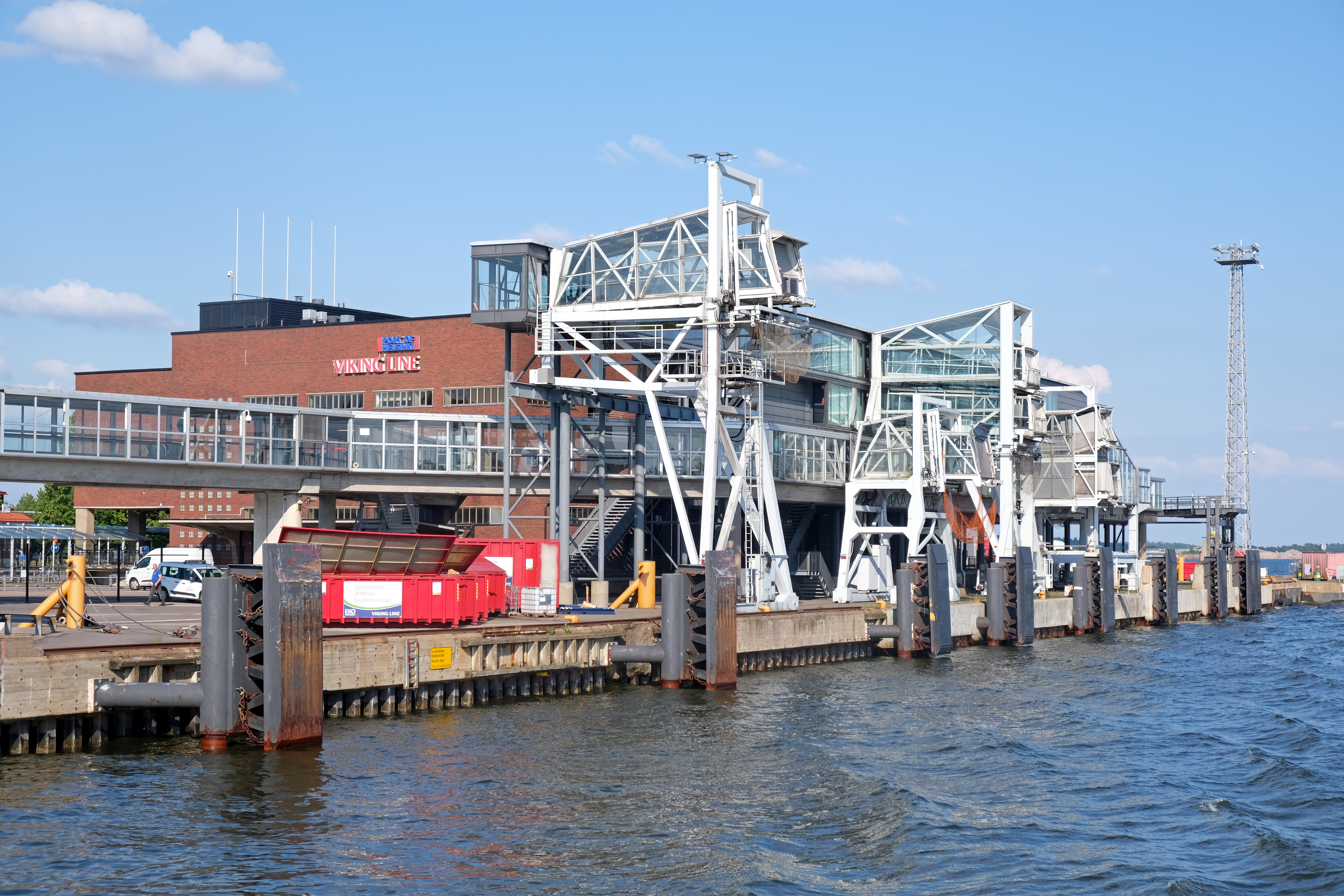
A seaside view of Katajanokka Terminal.

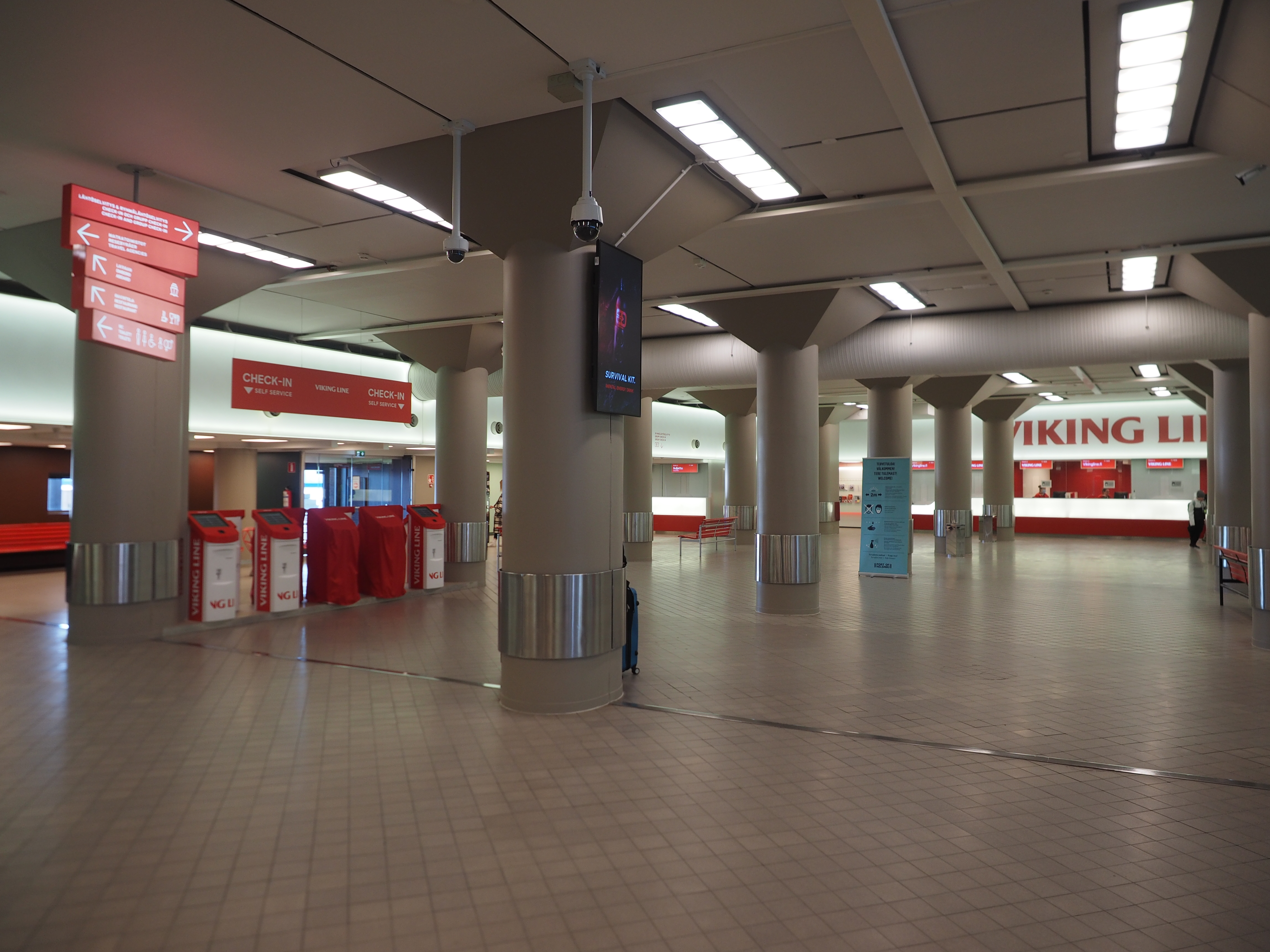
Interior of the Katajanokka Terminal.

Katajanokka Terminal (Finnish: Katajanokan terminaali, Swedish: Skatuddens terminal) is a ferry terminal located in Katajanokka, in the Southern Harbor of Helsinki, Finland. The shipping company Viking Line operates scheduled services from the terminal to Stockholm and Tallinn.

The terminal building was originally a customs warehouse, the harbour building K8. It was built in 1937 designed by the city architect Gunnar Taucher. The building was changed to a passenger terminal in 1977, when the Finnjet started traffic between Helsinki and Travemünde, Germany. The work for the change was designed by the harbour architect Kari Unelius. The terminal building has since been expanded many times, the latest time so far in 2008 with a new glass-walled expansion on the shore side, which was designed by architect Ari Bungers. The building is protected.

Opposite the terminal entrance is the anchor of the Russian passenger ship Iezekiil which sank in 1855. The anchor was found by divers near Suomenlinna in 1977.

The terminal is served by the Helsinki tram lines 5 and 4.

== Ships serving the terminal ==
Company	Ship	Route
(Finland) Viking Line	MS Gabriella	Helsinki – Mariehamn – Stockholm
(Finland) Viking Line	MS Viking Cinderella	Helsinki – Mariehamn – Stockholm
(Finland) Viking Line	MS Viking XPRS	Helsinki – Tallinn
