= Märta Blomstedt =

Finnish architect (1899–1982)

- Born: Märta Elisabeth Adelaide von Willebrand; 8 June 1899; Turku, Grand Duchy of Finland, Russian Empire
- Died: 16 February 1982 (aged 82); Helsinki, Finland
- Occupations: architect, furniture designer
- Years active: 1926–1972
- Known for: Finnish functionalism

Märta Blomstedt (1899–1982) was an architect and one of the driving forces of the Finnish functionalism movement. Partnering with her husband, Pauli E. Blomstedt, her first works were noted for their functional, rather than aesthetic or decorative appearance and settings in park-like environments. After her husband's death, initially she formed a firm with Matti Lampén to complete projects her husband and she had begun. Later, she and Lampén formed a firm designing their own creations. She designed all aspects of her buildings including the furnishings, demonstrated in one of Blomstedt & Lampén's most noted designs of the Hotel Aulanko.

During the war, Blomstedt & Lampén mostly worked on renovation and restoration projects of existing buildings, but at the war's end, they returned to their own designs. In addition to buildings, they were responsible for the city plans for Kuusjärvi and the Oravikoski Mining Community and created both public and private buildings in each city as well. When Lampén died, Blomstedt formed a partnership with Olli Penttilä and continued to work into the 1970s.

== Early life ==
Märta Elisabeth Adelaide von Willebrand was born on 8 June 1899 in Turku, Grand Duchy of Finland, Russian Empire to Bertha Mathilda (née Hoffstedt) and Reinhold Alexander von Willebrand. Von Willebrand studied architecture at the Helsinki University of Technology and graduated as an architect in 1922. She studied the new modern functionalism which in Finland focused on separation of the building structure from the façade and placing it in a park-like, healthy environment, full of air and light. In 1924, she married a fellow student and architect, Pauli E. Blomstedt and had their first child, Benita (1924–2016). The Finnish historian Yrjö Blomstedt (1926–1994) was their son. Between 1924 and 1929, she completed further study in Italy and France.

== Career ==
In 1926, the couple began a partnership in a firm as independent architects and in the same year, had their second child, Yrjö. Two years later Pauli won the competition to complete the Finnish Savings Bank in Helsinki. Though he served as lead architect on the project, he was assisted by Märta, Veikko Leistén, Matti Lampén and others, to complete the project in 1930. Blomstedt and her husband completed the Kotka Savings Bank and began work on the Kannonkoski Church, before he died in 1935. She and Lampén jointly completed several of the designs her husband had begun, including the Pohjanhovi Hotel in Rovaniemi, an important icon of the early modernist period. In 1938, the two formed their own firm, Blomstedt & Lampén. Among the works Blomstedt and Lampén designed were the Hotel Aulanko in Hämeenlinna. While the building was being constructed in 1939 Finnish actress Sirkka Sari fell off the roof and died during filming of Rikas tyttö.

During the war, Blomstedt & Lampén were hired to design repairs to the Ruuskanen House in the Kyttälä neighborhood of Tampere, which had been bombed. Between 1941 and 1942, they expanded the size of the home of the merchant, Kaarlo Ruuskanen, raising the size of the building on the Hämeen Street side, allowing for a surrounding terrace on the top floor. On the Pellavatehtaan Street side of the house, they constructed a wing in the functionalist style, which housed the Ruuskanen Clothing Factory until 1975. In 1948, Blomstedt & Lampén were hired to renovate the Lindström and Sörnäisten Factory in Helsinki. The firm was hired repeatedly to complete updates and further renovation on the structure. Other buildings in Helsinki in which Blomstedt & Lampén worked on renovations include: the real estate company Vladimirsgatan Building (1950 and 1979), the Tallberg house (1951), and the Primula Bakery Building (1957). In 1950, the firm completed a six-story residential and commercial building in the functionalist style in the city of Hämeenlinna and two years later completed the post office there as well. Blomstedt & Lampén were hired in 1954, for two projects in Imatra on Vuoksenniska Road, the design of the Suomen Yksityisyrittäjäin Puolue (SYP) party headquarters and the design of the Bio Vuoksi Cinema. That same year, the duo drew plans for the Nordic Union Bank and apartment building located at #19 Pitäjänmäki Road in Helsinki.

The city of Kuusjärvi hired Blomstedt & Lampén in 1955 to help with their city plan. They designed the plan for the municipality and built several of the significant buildings there, including the Käärmetalo (townhouse, 1955), possibly the club house with its adjacent gas station (1955) which bears the hallmark of their firm, the City Hall (1956), two apartment buildings, and the first modern rowhouse (1957). Blomstedt and Lampén also designed a number of projects for Outokumpu Ltd. They were the original designers hired in 1956 by Outokumpu Ltd. to design a mining community in Oravikoski in the municipality of Leppävirta. In addition to the community plan, they built numerous structures. In 1957, the duo completed the commercial marketplace Kuvalehti House in Helsinki and the following year completed the headquarters for the Copper Division of Outokumpu Ltd., also in Helsinki. The final project for Blomstedt & Lampén was the design of the Oulu International School (1961).

In 1961, Lampén died and Blomstedt formed a new partnership with Olli Penttilä, known as Blomstedt & Penttilä. Penttilä was brought into the project for the Oravikoski community. In 1964, the duo built the Vuorimiehentie II Building on the campus of the Helsinki University of Technology in the Otaniemi district of Espoo. The following year, Blomstedt & Penttilä built the first high-rise apartment in Oulu, located at #3 Hiidentie. In 1971, three years after Kuusjärvi was renamed to Outokumpu, Blomstedt & Penttilä designed three single-family homes there in an area known as the "Copper Deck" and later the "Arab Quarter" as supervisor's homes. The Copper Deck properties, located at #2, 4 and 6 were of identical construction.

Blomstedt died on 16 February 1982 and was buried in the Hietaniemi Cemetery in Helsinki.

== Projects ==
=== Blomstedt & Blomstedt, with Lampén ===
Kotka Savings Bank was a joint project between Pauli and Märta and was completed between 1934 and 1935. The three-story structure, topped by a neon sign, was constructed with a two-floor recessed entrance, overhung by the third-floor balcony. The interior featured a bowed front half-cylinder stretching up to the balcony and minimal supports to the cashier's barriers, giving a feeling of openness to the space.

Pauli drew the plans for the Kannonkoski Church in 1933 and work began on the project in 1934. Before his death, he had completed design of the club rooms, parish hall and organ loft, basing his design on drafts submitted for an earlier work of the Temppeliaukio Church. The church was completed by Märta and Lampén, with the construction done between 1937 and 1938. The effort to remove obsolete sentimentality resulted in a sole cross to indicate that the building was house of worship. The design was industrial, with the steeple resembling a grain silo and was built in an open landscape of corn fields. The roof of the chapel sloped sharply, rising toward the tower, which had slits resembling a radiator grill in the uppermost belfry area. The interior was a bowed rectangular design with windows along the sides following the roofline. The church has been listed on the Finnish National Board of Antiquities, the national registry of significant landmarks.

Work for the Pohjanhovi Hotel was planned by Pauli, who died just prior to the start of construction, in conjunction with a joint venture of the Finnish Tourist Association, Alcohol Board and Restaurant Association. Design work was done by Märta Blomstedt and Matti Lampén. The hotel was located in Rovaniemi on the western bank of the Kemijoki River. Surrounded by a park, adjacent to a flower meadow and forest, with winding paths for hikers, the hotel used the most modern construction techniques available. The design allowed flexibility, in that the rooms could be converted from lodging space to business spaces and had a fully electric kitchen. Interior design and furniture design was also overseen by Märta Blomstedt, to ensure that it was fully integrated into the overall project. The hotel won wide accolades as one of the most definitive examples of Finnish Functionalism and was recognized as the first hotel to be marketed as a winter holiday resort. The hotel was completely destroyed by the Nazis during the Lapland War in 1944.

Yaskelyaynena Cottage was another project planned by Pauli E. Blomstedt and completed after his death, by Märta Blomstedt and Matti Lampén between 1935 and 1937. The property is located in Kirjavalahti Bay of Lake Ladoga and was originally owned by the Helsinki pharmacist Tauno Yaskelyaynenu. The house was built under an overhanging rock with a forest above and the lake below and purposely designed to blend in with the natural landscape, using natural brick, stone and wood. From the bay only the front façade and part of the side face of the house can be seen, as the rest is hidden by the trees. A multi-level veranda and terrace were constructed on one side of the property. In 1947, the property was transferred to state ownership and was used rent-free as a retreat by the Union of Soviet Composers and then in 1990 it transferred again as the property of the Composers Union of the Republic of Karelia. The cottage has been designated a cultural heritage site and is listed on the Russian cultural heritage register.

=== Blomstedt & Lampén ===
In 1936, the Finnish Tourist Association bought the site of the former restaurant operated by the city of Hämeenlinna at the historic location of the Karlberg estate on the shore of Lake Vanajavesi. They contracted with Blomstedt & Lampén to build the Aulanko Hotel on the site of the former restaurant. Situated on a lake in a park setting, the hotel featured a restaurant, business lounge, office and music room, accessed from a spiral staircase on the ground floor in addition to the service areas and guest quarters. A terrace restaurant and courtyard opened off of the building into the vast park. The entire project was seen as a single artwork and the furnishings, tableware and textiles were part of the design. It was completed in 1939 and stamped in tourists' minds that Finland was at the forefront of a modern nation. The hotel represented a bold and comprehensive example of Finnish modernism.

The Seventh Lutheran Church of the Kivennapa parish was also known as the Pajarin Church, after Major General Aaro Pajarille whose troops helped build the church. The church was the only project completed in the Karelian district during World War II and was a project of Blomstedt & Lampén. It was constructed in 1943 and stood for 231 days before being destroyed in June 1944 during a Soviet attack in the resumption of the Winter War. The site was on the hillside of the old historic Kivennapa Castle and built near the location of the former rectory which had burned. The building was a simple design adorned only by a tall cross carved of a single piece of wood. The building was constructed of wood from Ingria and interior had seating for 500 people made of larch from the Lintula Forest in Raivola. Lampen published an article on the construction of the church in Arkkitehti- lehdessä in early 1944.

In 1948, Blomstedt & Lampén were hired to renovate the Lindström and Sörnäisten Factory in Helsinki. They completely remodeled the structure adding an additional story, completing the work in 1949. They returned to the factory in 1955 to increase the structure to a four-story building. When the owners needed to modify the boiler room and create a storage area for flammable liquids Blomstedt & Penttilä completed the additional work in 1961.

The façade plan for #19 Pitäjänmäki Road in Helsinki was dated by Blomstedt & Lampén in 1954. The building served as the headquarters of the SYP party, was the location of the Nordic Union Bank and had nineteen apartments of varying sizes on the upper floors. Some of the apartments had balconies, which were slanted to provide a terraced look to the design. The slanted shed-style roof rose above the eaves at the peak.

The initial planning of the Oravikoski Mining Community began in 1956, after ore was discovered in the region in 1954. Blomstedt & Lampén's work, in addition to designing the overall city plan, consisted of numerous housing units, including seven two story apartment buildings which would service twelve families each; two bachelor residences, five 1–4 family row houses, and three detached houses. Community buildings included a cinema with a canteen built in 1957, a nursery school built in 1958, as well as a sauna, laundry and the heating plant. Typical housing included, for example, #19 Miller Road (1958) which was a row house with three apartments, each featuring a private sauna and basement with vertical wood cladding on the exterior. #21 Miller Road was a single-story dwelling built for the mine supervisor in 1958. #17 Miller Road (1960) was a four-unit single-story row house built initially for the senior engineers. The building was featured wooden, vertical cladding and each unit had a basement area. Beginning in 1960, due to the increased use of automobiles, garages were added to existing construction in compatible styles to the houses.

=== Blomstedt & Penttilä ===
When Lampén died, Penttilä was brought in to help Blomstedt complete work on the Oravikoski Mining Community. Blomstedt & Penttilä designed residential dwellings, similar to their projects at #16 Miller Road (1969) and #18 Miller Road (1969). Both were one-story residential dwellings built for mine management, which originally featured a flat roof design.

Blomstedt & Penttilä designed the teaching facility for the Department of Mining and Metallurgical Engineering, known as the Vuorimiehentie II Building, on the campus of the Helsinki University of Technology in the Otaniemi. Construction was completed in 1964 and was built in three phases. The original design was a two-story brick clad structure with windows in ribbon-like rows.

== Gallery ==
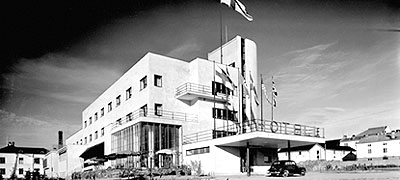
Hotel Pohjanhovi Hotel, 1936

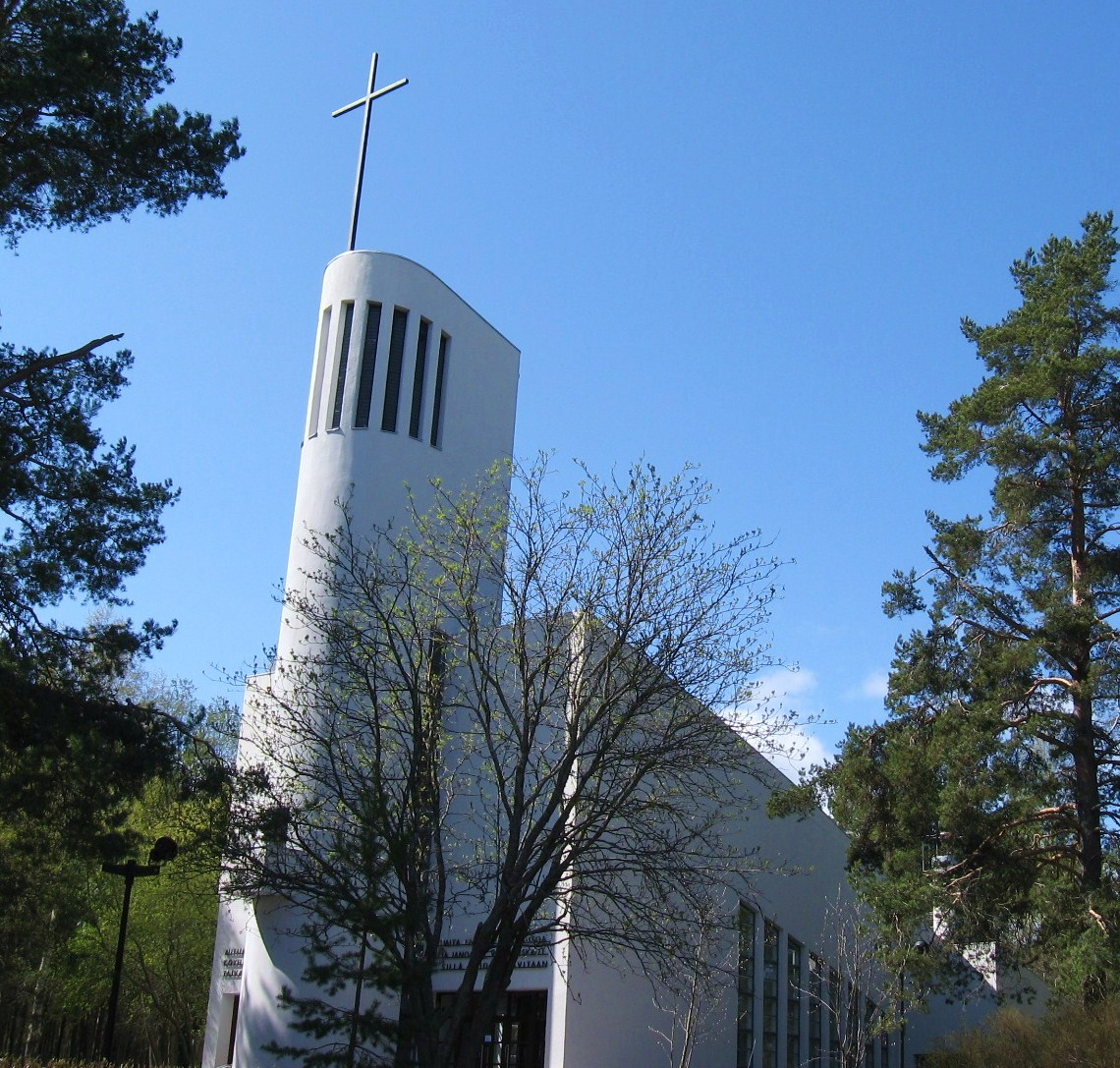
Kannonkoski Church

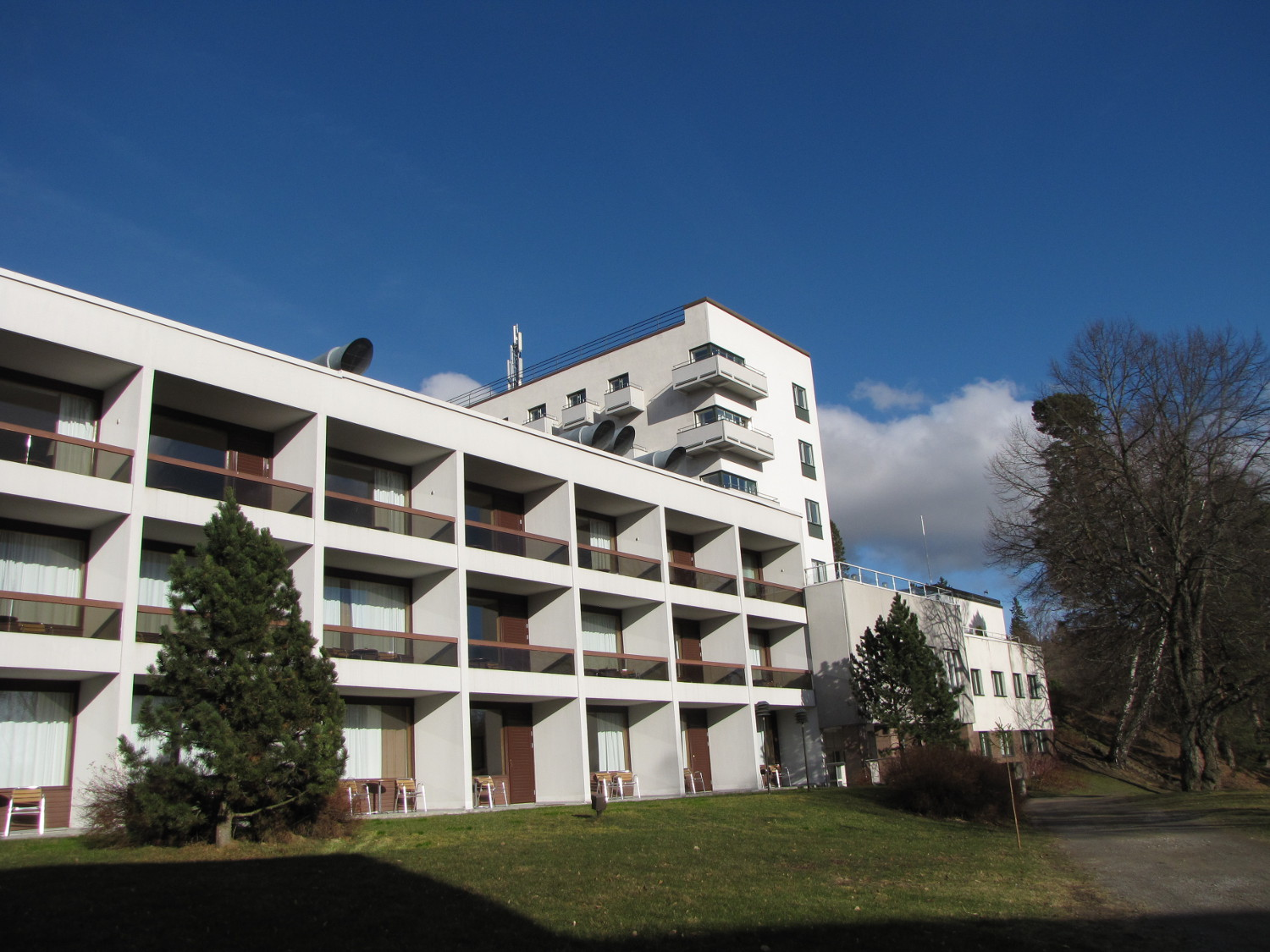
Hotel Rantasipi Aulanko

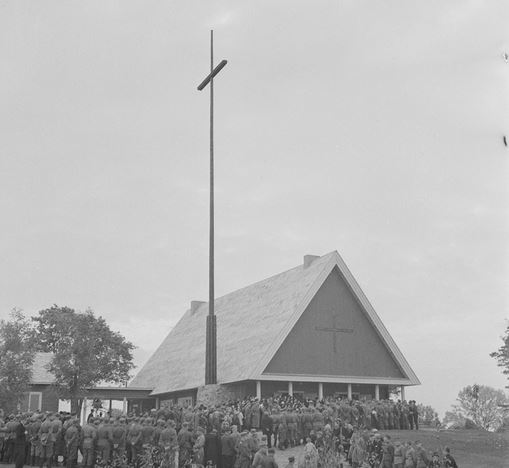
Dedication of the Seventh Lutheran Church of Kivennapa 26 September 1943

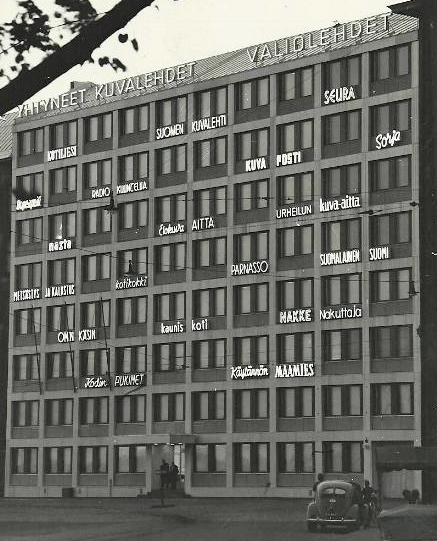
Kuvalehti House, #13 Hietalahdenranta, Helsinki

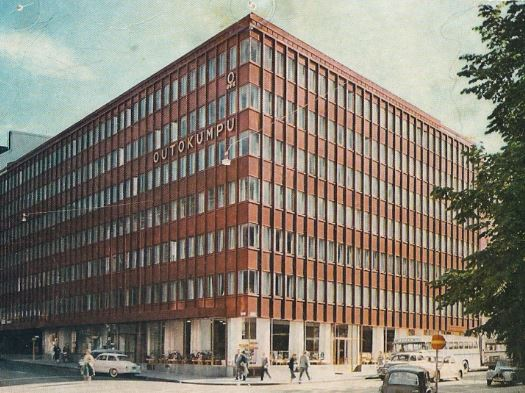
Outokumpu Ltd Copper Headquarters, Helsinki

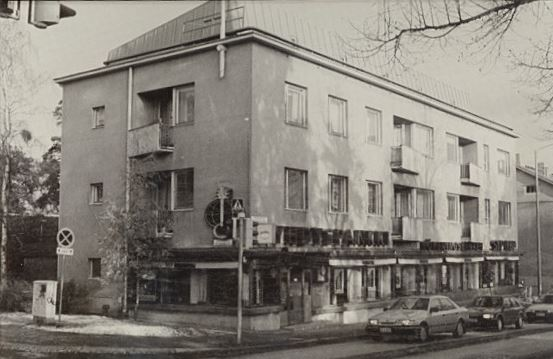
Nordic Union Bank #19 Pitäjänmäki Road, Helsinki

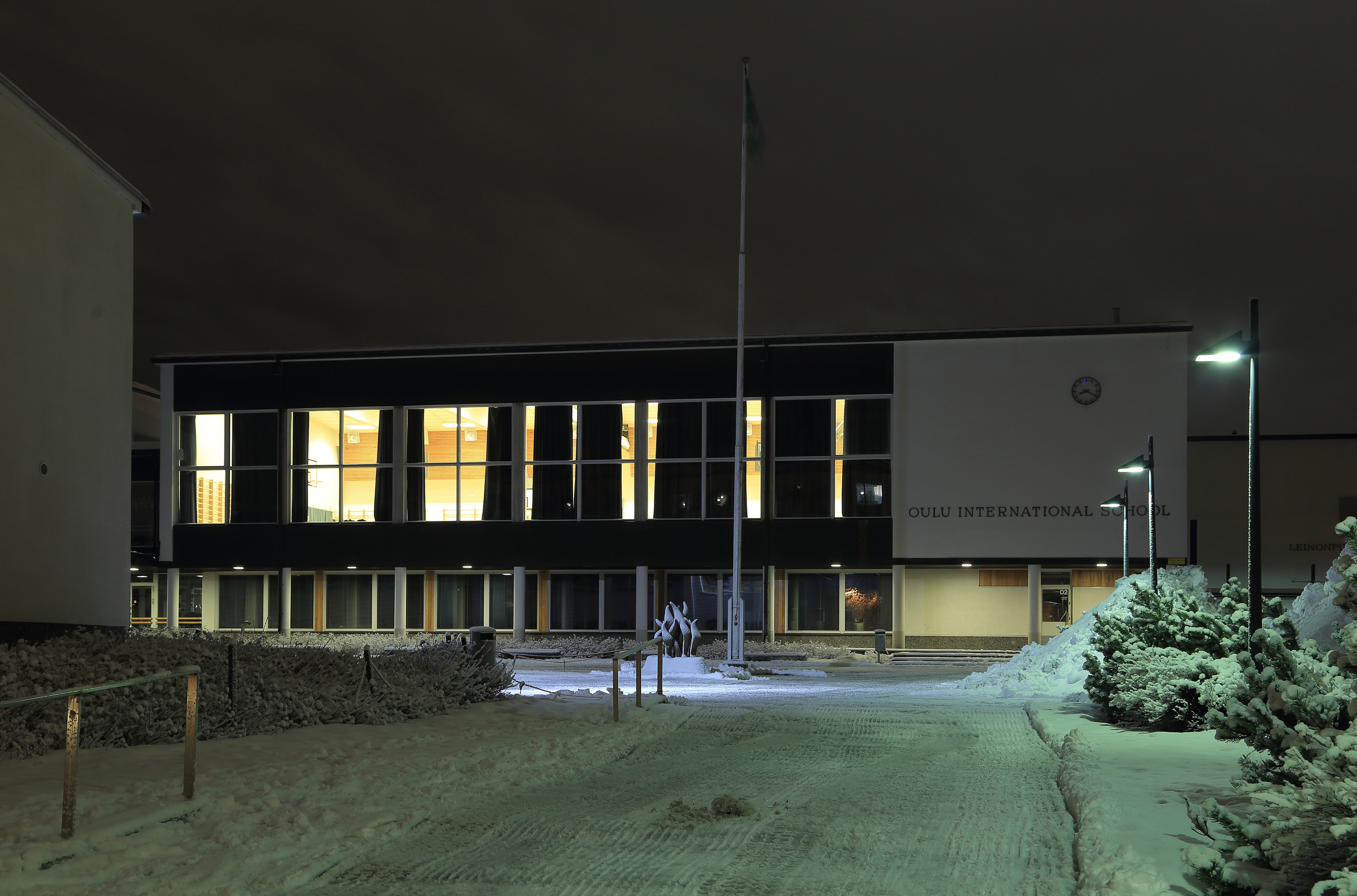
Oulu International School
