= Pauli E. Blomstedt =

Finnish architect and designer (1900–1935)

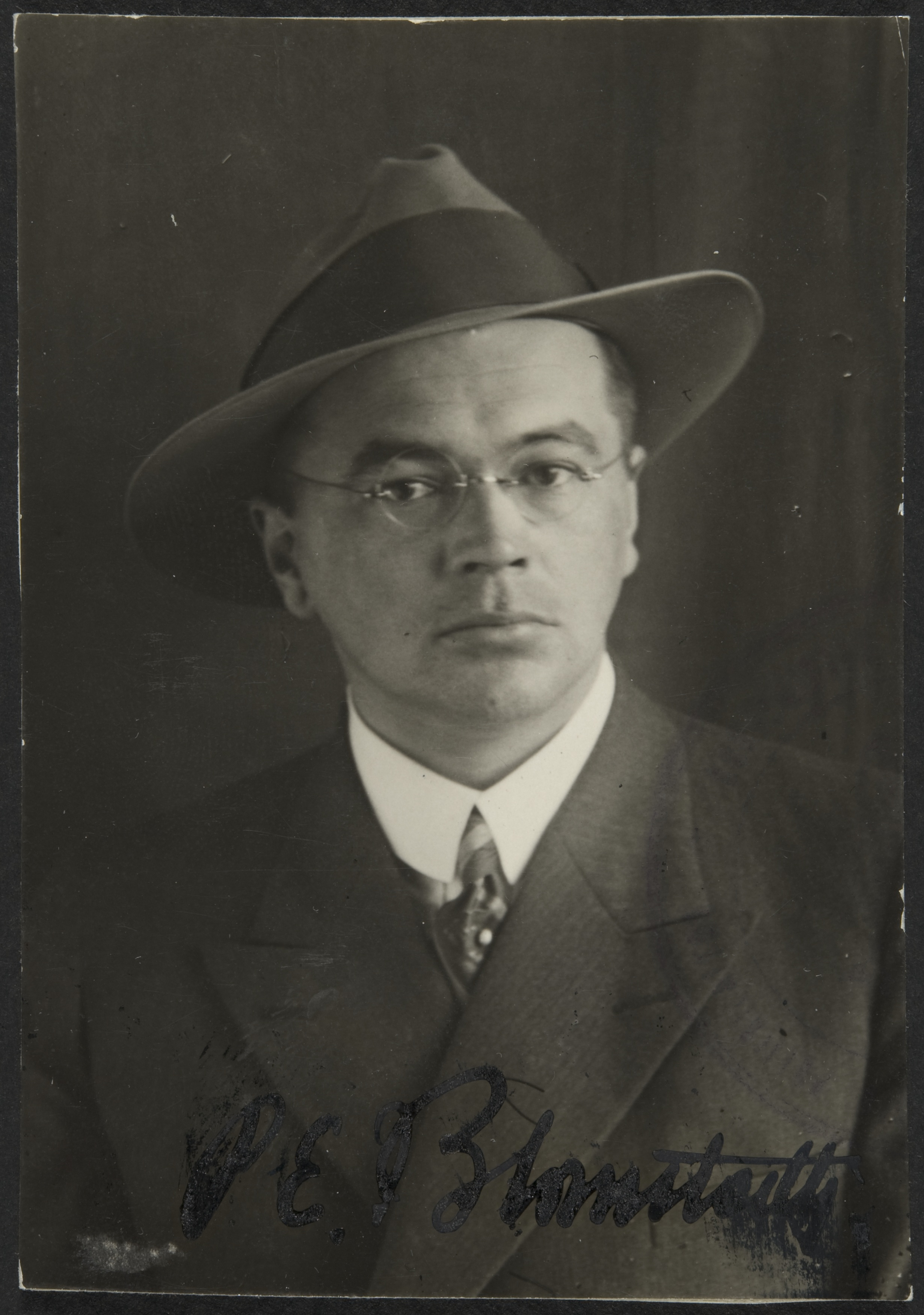
P. E. Blomstedt.

Pauli Ernesti Blomstedt, more commonly known as P. E. Blomstedt (1 August 1900 Jyväskylä – 3 November 1935, Helsinki), was a Finnish architect and designer, who worked first in the Nordic Classicism style and then turned to Functionalism. His father, Yrjö Blomstedt, and younger brother, Aulis Blomstedt, were also well-known architects.

== Life and career ==
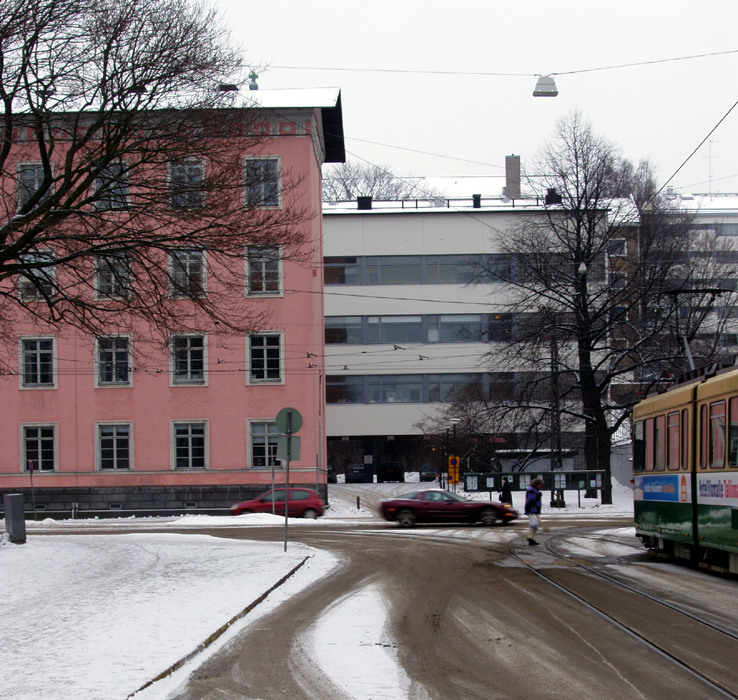
Finnish Language Adult Education Centre, Helsinki, 1927 and extension, 1959.

Blomstedt graduated from secondary school in Jyväskylä in 1918, and then started studies in architecture at Helsinki Technical University, graduating in 1922. He first worked as an architect for Armas Lindgren, and later for Bertel Jung as well as working as an assistant to Gunnar Taucher in the City of Helsinki building department. It is a matter of dispute how great an input Blomstedt had in the design of the Finnish Language Adult Education Centre in Helsinki (1927), a key example of the Nordic Classicism style in Finland, usually credited to Taucher – and which was later extended in the Functionalist style by Blomstedt's brother Aulis Blomstedt. Blomstedt also worked with Taucher on the design of the Mäkelänkatu municipal workers’ housing, another key example of the Nordic Classicism style in Finland.

In 1924 Blomstedt married architect Märta von Willebrand, who had been his fellow student, and who would also become a well-known architect. In 1926 they set up their own architectural firm. They had two children:Yrjö Blomstedt (1926-1994), who became a professor of history at the University of Helsinki and Benita Pasanen (1924-2016), who became the director of the Oulu City Library.

Among Blomstedt's first independent designs were Defence Corps buildings in Jyväskylä and Hämeenlinna, but these were never realised. During the 1920s Blomstedt took part in a number of architectural competitions and made his breakthrough, aged 26, in 1926 after winning the competition for the design of Liittopankki (Federal Bank) in Helsinki, completed in 1929. At the same time, he also won the competition for the design of the Finnish Savings Bank in Helsinki, completed in 1930. Both these buildings were designed in the Nordic Classicism style prominent at that time, which had overtaken the Jugendstil style dominant for prominent buildings in Helsinki at the turn of the century. His buildings from that time are said to be characterised by a “passionate expressiveness”, with his bank designs having something in common also with the American office building style of Louis Sullivan.

In 1931, Pauli E. Blomstedt and Kerttu Tamminen were invited to present proposals for the future expression of Kirkkopuisto.

Blomstedt wrote several articles for both Finnish professional journals and newspapers, mainly on the topic of town planning. In his article "The Town Planning issues in the Greater Helsinki city centre" he opposed the grand plan by Eliel Saarinen for the Helsinki city centre, according to which the area of Töölönlahti would be filled in with buildings along a new grand avenue and the city's main railway station moved northwards to Pasila. Blomstedt argued that the area should be retained as a park area.

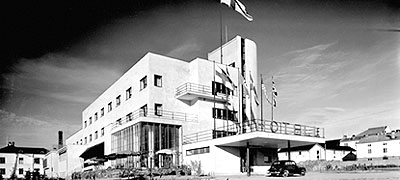
Hotel Pohjanhovi Hotel, 1936.

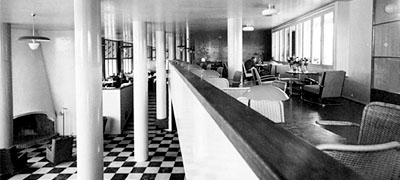
Interior, Hotel Pohjanhovi Hotel, 1936.

Blomstedt's breakthrough works in the Functionalist style were the Finnish Savings Bank in Kotka (1935) and the Pohjanhovi Hotel and restaurant in Rovaniemi (1935, destroyed in the Lapland War). A significant design not realised was his entry titled "Ruotsinsalmi” for the architectural competition for the design of Kotka City Hall (won by another Functionalist proposal by Erkki Huttunen).

In 1933 Blomstedt took part in the architectural competition for the Temppeliaukio Church in Helsinki. His proposal was considered too utopian to be implemented. However, in the 1960s a new competition was held and the winning entry by Timo and Tuomo Suomalainen was similar to that of Blomstedt.

From 1933 Blomstedt became the official architect for Alko, which holds the alcoholic beverage retailing monopoly in Finland. He designed their shop and restaurant interiors, including the Pohjanhovi Hotel and restaurant in Rovaniemi. Blomstedt's final building design, the Kannonkoski Church, was completed in 1938, three years after his premature death, under the direction of his wife and fellow architect Märta Blomstedt together with architect Matti Lampén.

In addition to his architectural work, Blomstedt also designed tubular steel furniture.

An exhibition on the life's work of Blomstedt was held at the Museum of Finnish Architecture in 1972, with over 450 drawings on display.

== Buildings by P. E. Blomstedt ==
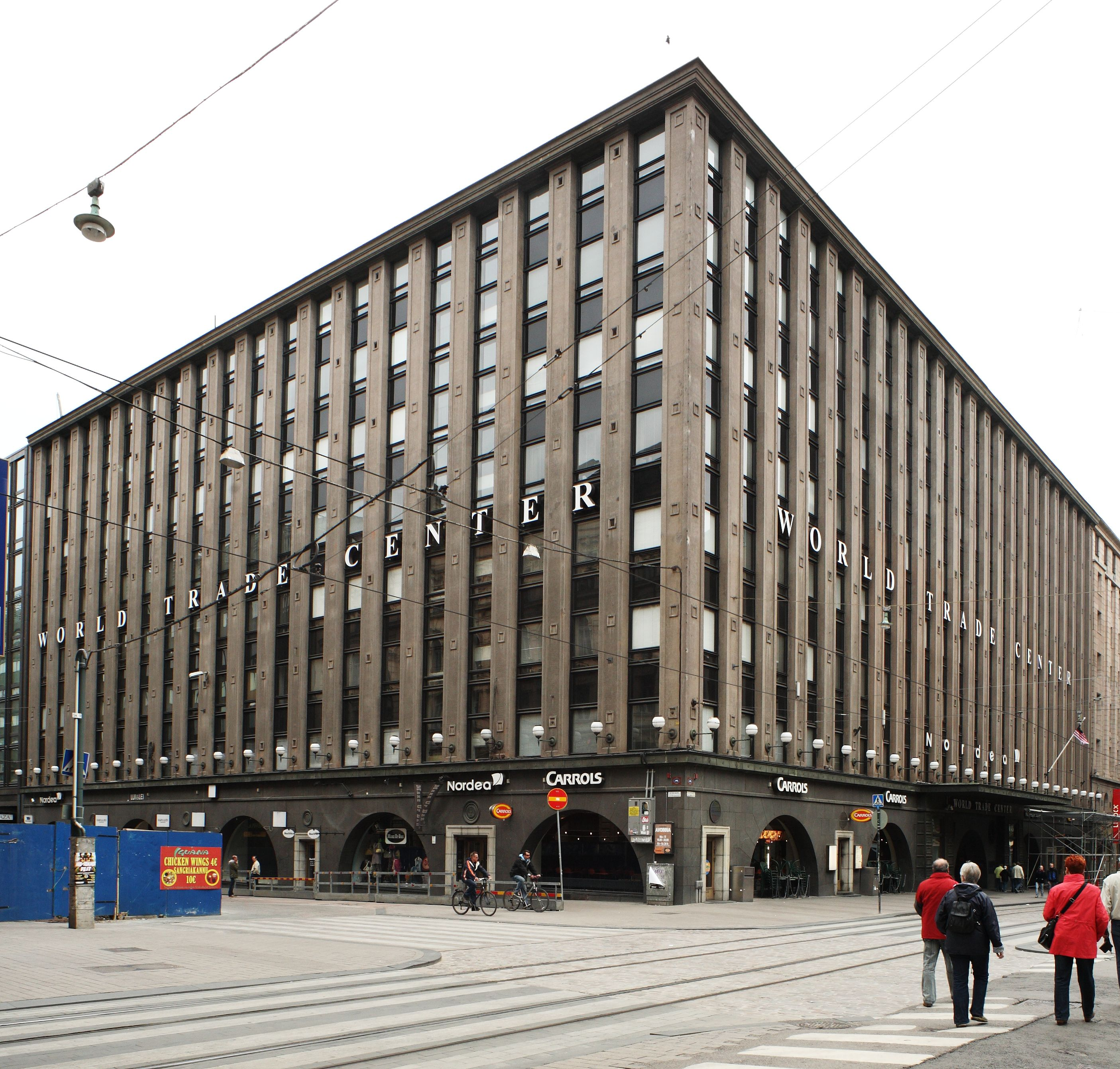
Liittopankki bank building, Helsinki, 1929.

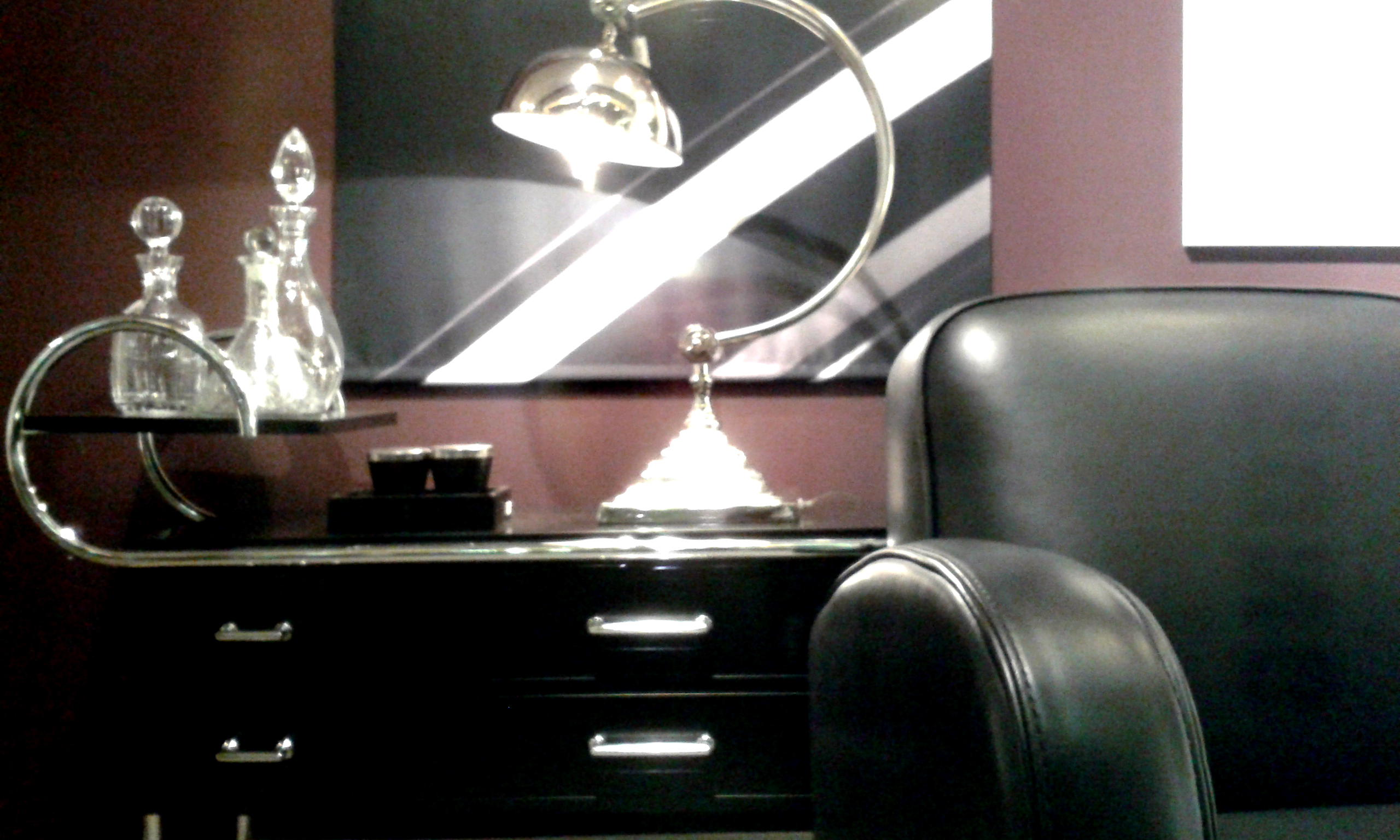
Blomstedt Art Deco furniture.

- Liittopankki (Union Bank) House, Helsinki, 1929
- Finnish Savings Bank, Helsinki, 1930
- Jyväskylä mortuary chapel, 1931
- Sea canoeing sheds, Helsinki 1932
- Villa Mellin, Helsinki, 1933
- Rantala (so-called Apteekkari Jääskeläinen villa), Sortavala, 1935
- Finnish Savings Bank, Kotka, 1935
- Hotel Pohjanhovi, Rovaniemi, 1936 (destroyed in the Lapland War in 1944)
- Kannonkoski church, 1938

== See also ==
- Architecture of Finland
