= Viking XPRS =

Finnish ship

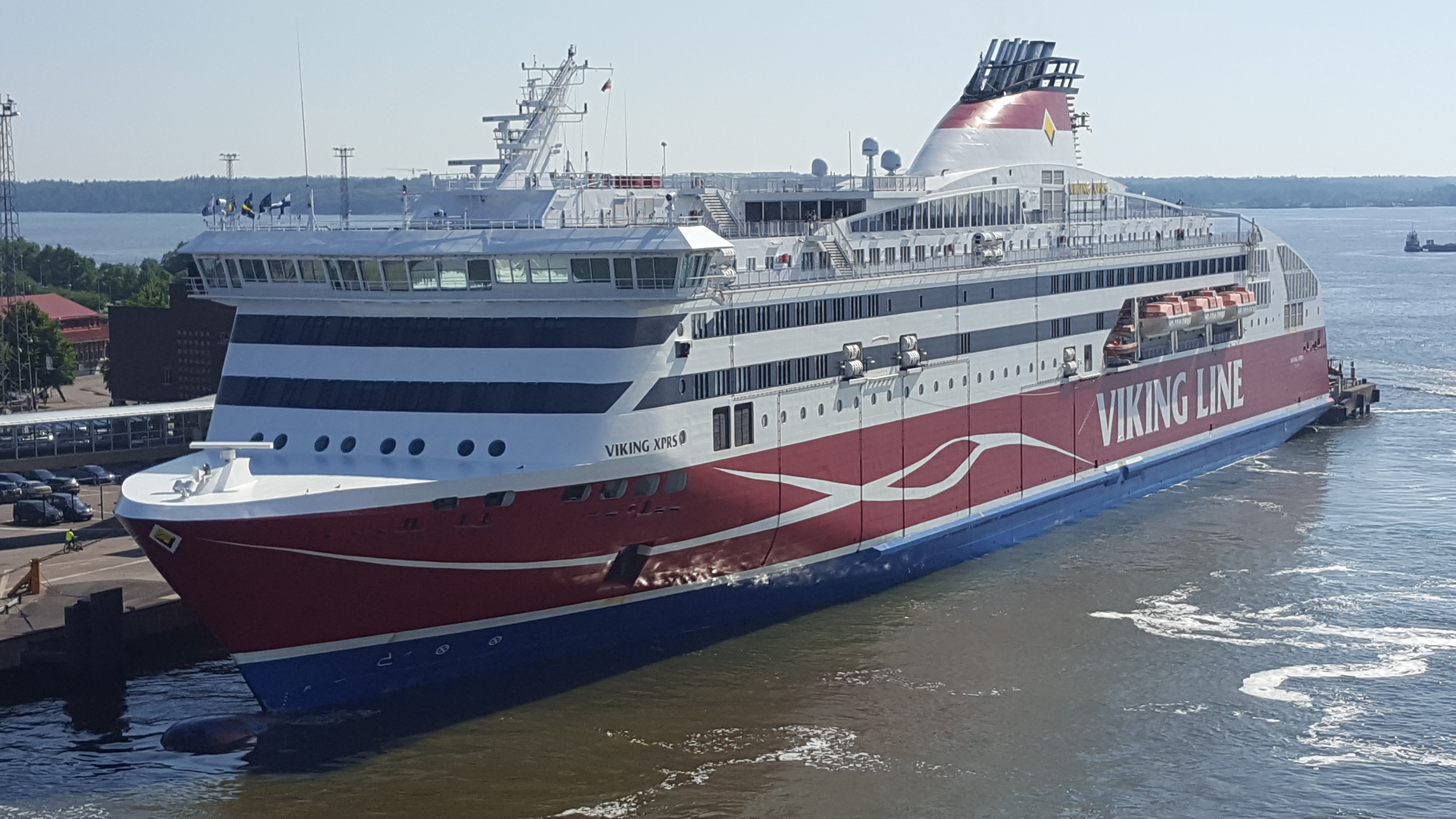
- Viking XPRS docked at Katajanokka Terminal in Helsinki, June 2016.

History

Finland
- Name: Viking XPRS
- Owner: Viking Line
- Operator: Viking Line
- Port of registry: Mariehamn, Finland
- Route: Helsinki–Tallinn
- Ordered: 29 November 2005
- Builder: Aker Finnyards Helsinki New Shipyard, Helsinki, Finland
- Cost: €130 million (est.)
- Yard number: 1358
- Laid down: 16 April 2007
- Launched: 19 September 2007
- Christened: 19 September 2007 by Paula Koivuniemi
- Acquired: 21 April 2008
- Maiden voyage: 27 April 2008
- In service: 28 April 2008
- Identification: Call sign: OJND; IMO number: 9375654; MMSI number: 276813000
- Status: In service

General characteristics
- Type: Fast cruiseferry
- Tonnage: 35,918 GT
- Length: 185 m (606 ft 11 in)
- Beam: 27.70 m (90 ft 11 in)
- Draught: 6.65 m (21 ft 10 in)
- Decks: 10 (8 passenger accessible)
- Ice class: 1 A Super
- Installed power: 4 × Wärtsilä 8L46F; 40,000 kW (combined)
- Speed: 25 knots (46 km/h; 29 mph) (service speed)
- Capacity: 2,500 passengers; 732 passenger beds; 240 cars; 1,000 lanemeters
- Crew: 100

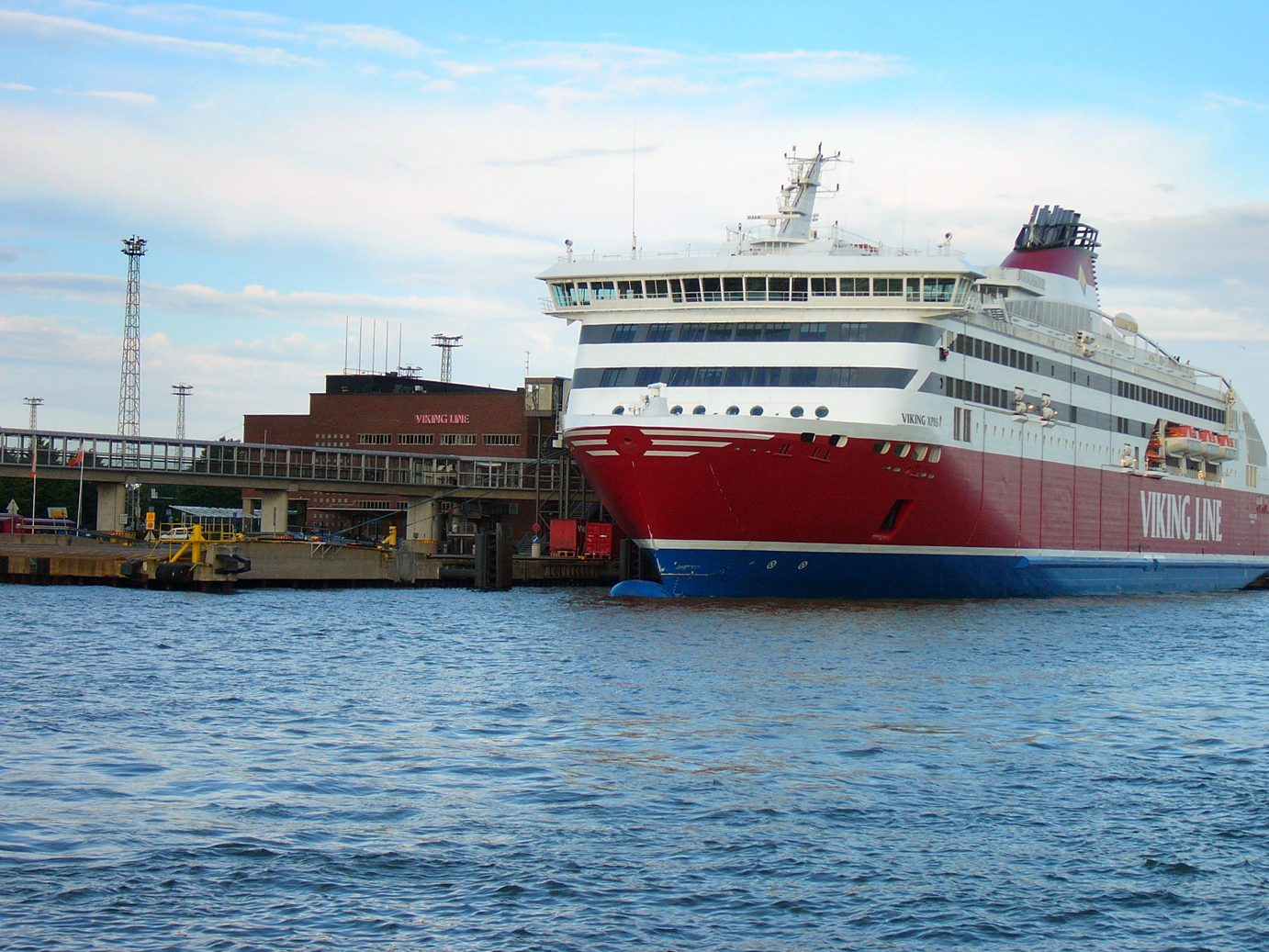
Viking XPRS at Katajanokka terminal in Helsinki

Viking XPRS is a fast cruiseferry owned by the Finland-based Viking Line and operated on their service between Helsinki, Finland and Tallinn, Estonia. Her keel was laid on 16 April 2007 and launching took place on 19 September 2007. Viking XPRS entered service on 28 April 2008.

== Concept ==
Viking XPRS is Viking Line's first new building for the Helsinki–Tallinn route. She is the first new building delivered to the company since Kalypso in 1990 and also Viking Line's first fast cruiseferry, with a building contract worth approximately 120–130 million euros. The Viking XPRS makes the crossing between the two capitals in about two and a half hours, with two daily departures from each port. The ship is designed with separate cardecks for freight and for passengers cars, and with a limited passenger cabin capacity as she only does daytime crossings. The interiors of the Viking XPRS were designed by Tillberg Design, like those of several of the company's earlier newbuildings.

In April 2009 the Viking XPRS won the award for Outstanding Ferry Exterior in ShipPax Awards 2009, held as a part of the Shipping 2009 conference in France.

=== Planned sister ships ===
The order of the Viking XPRS included an option for two sister vessels. On 2 October 2006, Viking Line announced that this option would not be exercised.

== Name and home port ==
The name Viking XPRS was originally only a concept name for the new ship. A naming competition was held on Viking Line website in May and June 2007, which resulted in over 16,000 name proposals. The concept name Viking XPRS was suggested by many entrants to the competition, and in the end it was chosen as the ship's final name due to it already being well known by the public. The naming ceremony took place on 14 September 2007.

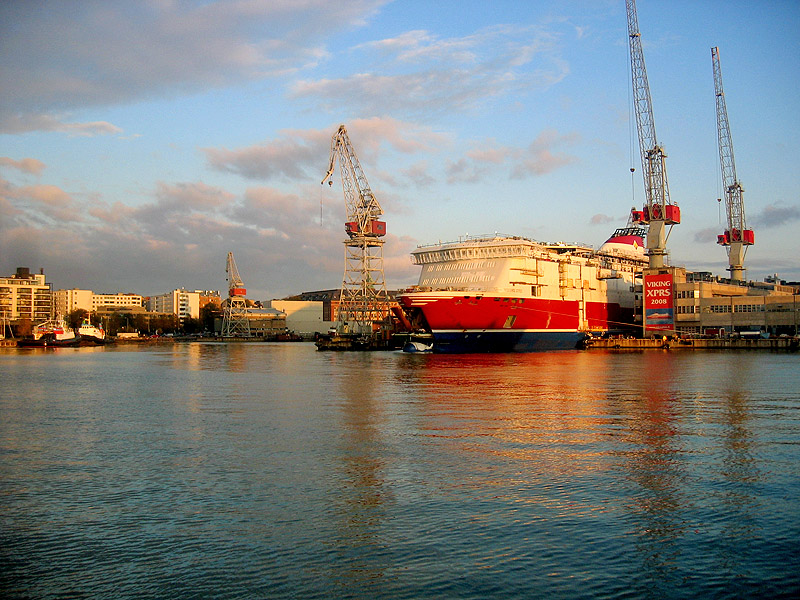
Viking XPRS under construction at Helsinki New Shipyard

The ship was originally planned to be registered in Finland, with Mariehamn painted on the hull as the home port when the ship was floated out of dry dock. Due to difficulties in negotiations with the Finnish Seafarer's Union and the generally higher personnel expenses under Finnish flag, the company decided to move the ship under Swedish flag in January 2008. In March 2008 Norrtälje in Sweden was revealed as the port of registry. But from 24 January 2014 Viking XPRS started sailing under Estonian flag, as it cuts costs for Viking Line. Because of that the ship got a new Estonian crew and all of the signs were changed from Swedish to Estonian and English. The new home port was Tallinn.

Viking Line announced on 7 December 2022 that Viking XPRS would be reflagged to Finland citing that it wished to simplify the hiring process. The ship remained at the harbour for two days from 6 March 2023 and made its maiden voyage under the Finnish flag on 8 March 2023.

== Construction ==
Viking XPRS was built at Aker Finnyards' Helsinki New Shipyard. The original delivery date of the ship was set for January 2008, but due to numerous delays the delivery of the ship was pushed back until 28 April 2008. Reasons for the delays included slower-than-planned furnishing works and faults in one of the Rolls-Royce-manufactured propellers. Due to the propeller fault the ship sailed for dry docking at Aker Finnyards' Rauma shipyard on 8 April 2008 where the propeller was changed. The ship was eventually delivered to Viking Line on 21 April 2008.

== Service history ==
Viking XPRS had to undergo changes as soon as she was completed, because some of the interior solutions did not work properly and the ship completely lacked a night club.

Viking XPRS made her maiden voyage between Helsinki and Tallinn on 27 April 2008 and entered regular service on the route the following day. Compared to Rosella that had sailed on the route the previous year the Viking XPRS attracted a notably larger number of passengers, with a 61% raise in passenger number and 74% raise in vehicles transported between Helsinki and Tallinn between June and August 2008 compared to the same months in 2007. During her first year in service, the ship transported approximately 1,466,000 passengers – more than any other ship that has trafficked in the northern Baltic Sea.

In February 2009 the Viking XPRS was voted as one of the top 5 medium-sized cruise ships in the world by readers of the prestigious Condé Nast Traveler guide, rating higher than the ships of Holland America Line amongst others. Viking XPRS gained top spot in the "shore excursions" category, despite the fact the ship offers no organised excursions. In addition to the fact that the Viking XPRS is not an actual cruise ship, this led to the proposition that the ship's high placement in the ranking was in fact the result of a hoax of some kind.

The ship was renovated in 2015 when a new à la carte restaurant Wine & Dine and a smaller Fashion Shop in connection to the conference rooms were opened. Also the conference room lobby, the children's play room and the restaurant Red Rose were renovated. The outer decks got more seats.

In January 2017 Viking XPRS moved to the Landskrona docks, where the public spaces and cabins were renovated. The ship also got new propellers. During the reparations the ship was temporarily replaced with MS Rosella on the Helsinki-Tallinn route.

From 8 to 24 January 2020 MS Rosella again temporarily replaced Viking XPRS on the Helsinki-Tallinn route because of a dock visit.

=== Reflagging to Estonia ===
In October 2012 Viking Line announced that it would make significant cost cuts on Viking XPRS by reflagging the ship to Estonia. The reason for the benefit was that in Estonia, wages and social costs were 40% lower. The change affected over two hundred employees.

On 24 January 2014 the ship was re-flagged to Estonia, right after returning from repairs which started on 13 January. MS Viking XPRS was the first ship in Viking Line's history to sail under the Estonian flag.

=== Reflagging to Finland ===
On 7 December 2022 Viking Line announced that Viking XPRS would be re-flagged to Finland. The reason was that Viking Line wishes to simplify the recruitment process and wants to eliminate the middle party from the recruitment process. Viking XPRS departed on her final voyage under the Estonian flag from Tallinn on Sunday 5 March 2023 at 22:15 and arrived in Helsinki on Monday 6 March 2023 at 00:30. The ship then remained at the harbour during the process of reflagging and departed on its maiden voyage under Finnish flag on Wednesday 8 March 2023 at 20:30.

== Decks ==
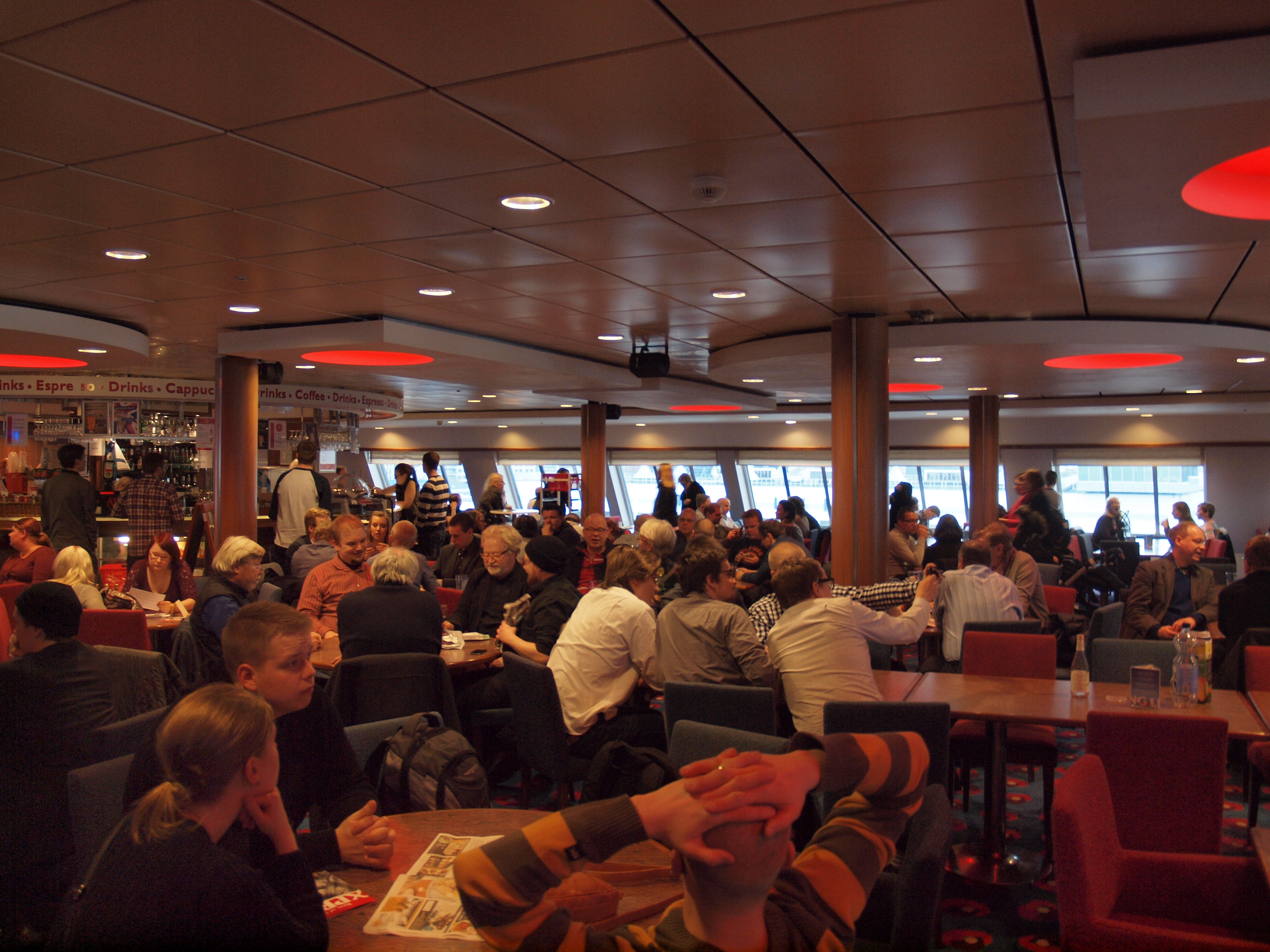
The Red Rose bar on deck 8 hosting the Finnish pub quiz championships in 2015.

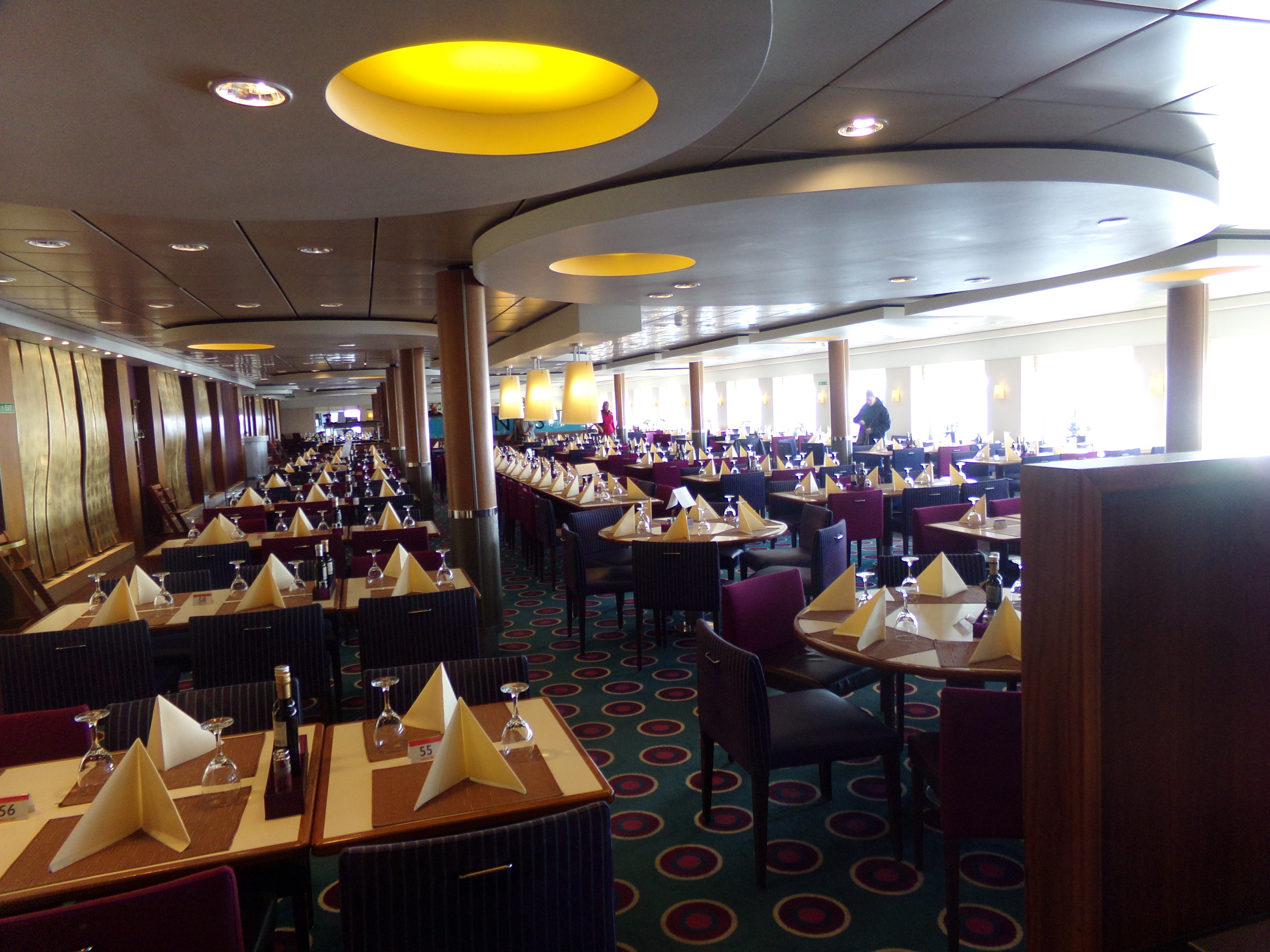
Interior of the buffet restaurant on deck 8.

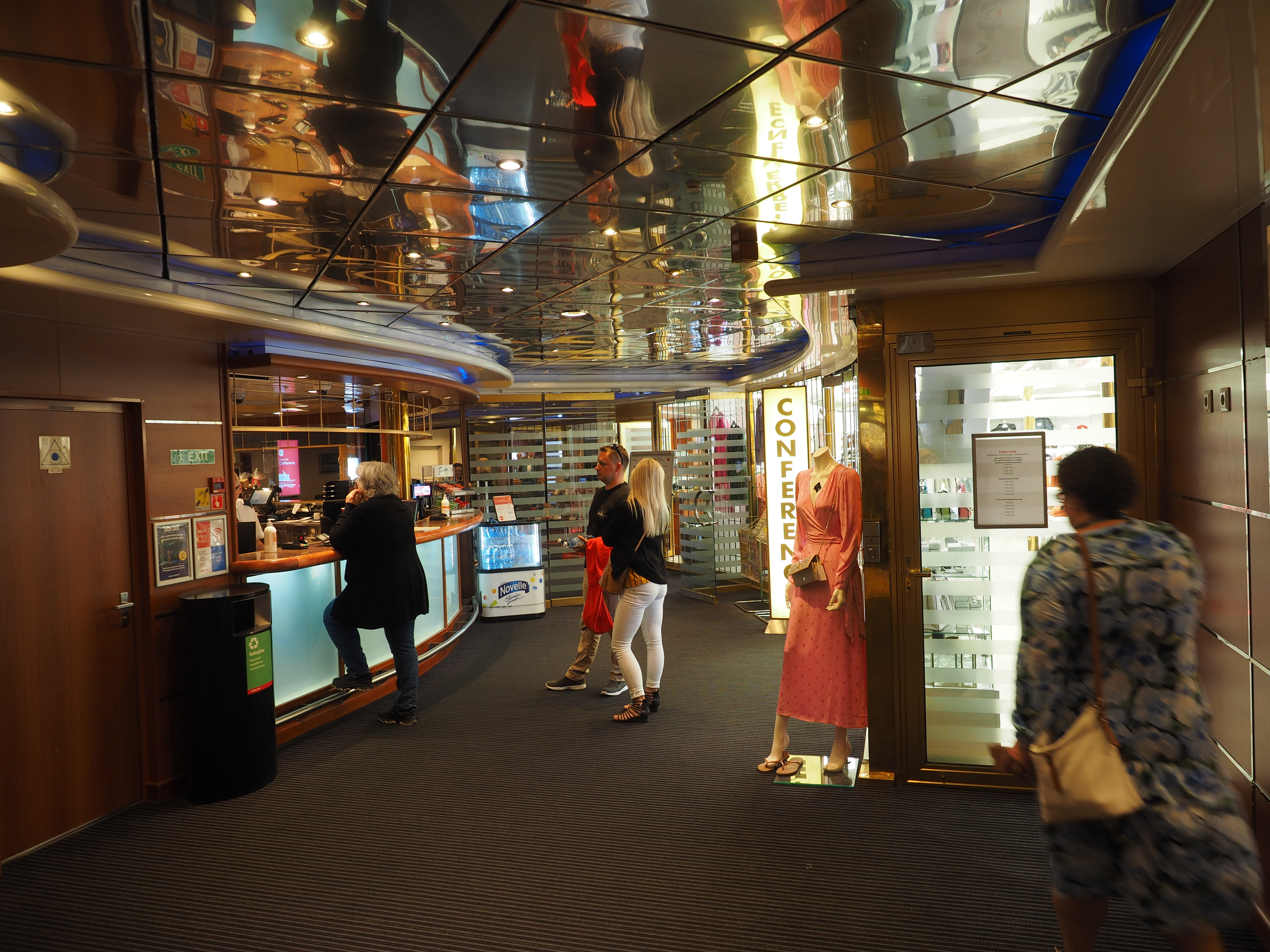
The information desk on deck 7.

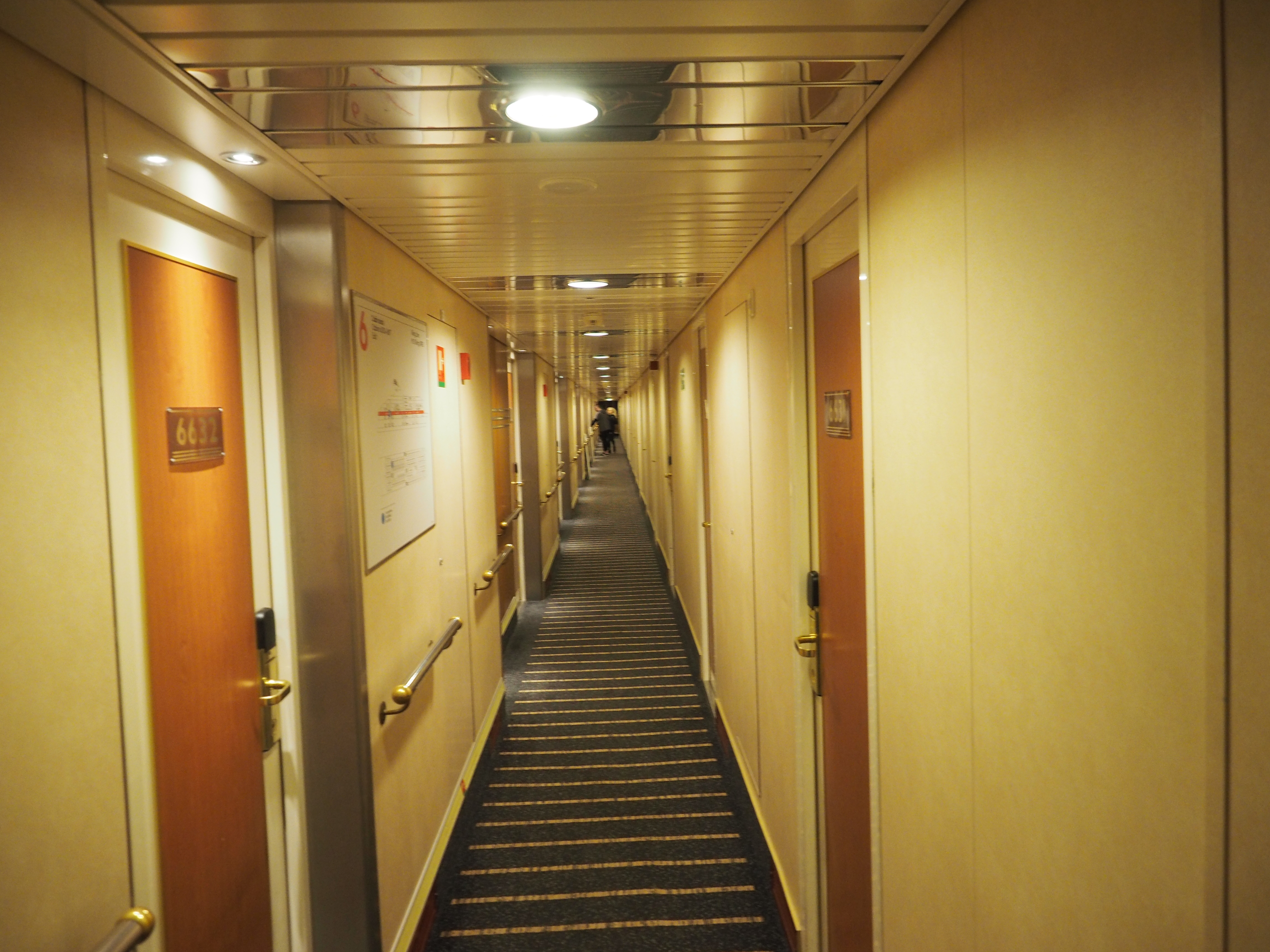
A corridor leading to the cabins on deck 6.

The ship has ten decks but not all are accessible to passengers.

Deck 10
Sextant deck - Bar and sun deck.
Deck 9
Compass deck - Bridge.
Deck 8
Restaurant deck - Restaurants Bistro Bella and Wine & Dine, café Xpresso Street, Blue Deli, Red Rose bar, children's play room and sun deck at the aft.
Deck 7
Shopping & conference deck - Conference rooms, Viking's Inn pub, Dance Pavilion, duty free shop, information desk, sun desk at the aft, embarkation and disembarkation.
Deck 6
Cabin deck - cabins, embarkation and disembarkation.
Deck 5
Car deck - car deck.
Decks 3-4
Cargo deck - car decks.
Decks 1-2
Primary and secondary engine rooms, engine supervision and other technical facilities.

== Cabins ==
With Viking Grace, Viking Line changed the names of the cabin classes from the traditional letter and number combinations to more descriptive names. The new names were gradually taken into use on other Viking Line ships as well. All cabins have a toilet and a shower.

Seaside Premium (LYX)
A spacious cabin for four people with a window. A double bed and a couch bed. Surface area 17.5 - 23.0 m^{2}.
Seaside Standard (A4)
A cabin for four people with a window. Two bunk beds. Surface area 9.5 m^{2}.
Seaside Standard Allergy (A4R)
A cabin for four people with a window, without a full-floor mat. Two bunk beds. Surface area 9.5 m^{2}.
Seaside Standard (A2P)
A cabin for two people with a window. A bunk bed. Surface area 8.6 m^{2}.
Inside Standard (B4)
A cabin for four people without a window. Two bunk beds. Surface area 9.3 m^{2}.
Inside Standard Allergy (B4R)
A cabin for four people without a window, without a full-floor mat. Two bunk beds. Surface area 9.3 m^{2}.
Inside Handicap (HB3)
A cabin for three people without a window. Designed for the disabled. A bunk bed with two lower beds and an upper bed. Surface area 13.4 m^{2}.
Inside Piccolo (B2P)
A small cabin for two people without a window. A bunk bed. Surface area 6.8 m^{2}.
Inside Piccolo Allergy (B2R)
A small cabin for two people without a window, without a full-floor mat. A bunk bed. Surface area 6.8 m^{2}.
Inside Piccolo Small (B2S)
A small cabin for two people without a window. A bunk bed. Surface area 5.9 m^{2}.
