= Yrjö Blomstedt =

Finnish historian (1926–1994)

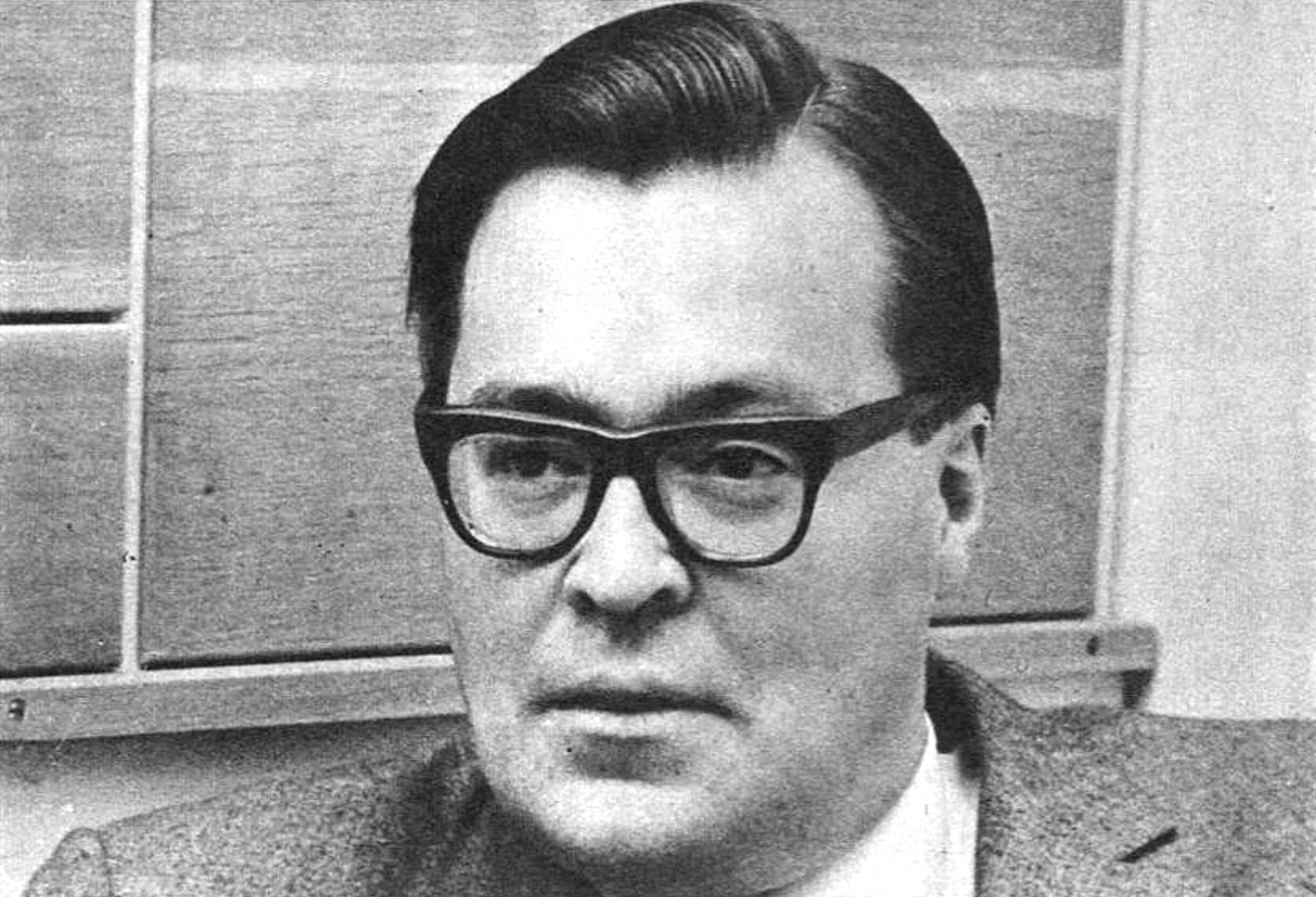
Yrjö Blomstedt

Yrjö Reinhold Emanuel Blomstedt (25 March 1926 in Helsinki – 13 April 1994 in Helsinki) was a Finnish historian. He was the son of architects Pauli E. Blomstedt and Märta Blomstedt (née von Willebrand). He studied history at the University of Helsinki, receiving his PhD in 1958. Between 1960 and 1964 he was a docent in Finnish history at Helsinki University and in 1964 was appointed professor in legal history and Roman law.

Blomstedt was very interested in genealogy and was at various times chairman of the Finnish Genealogical Society. Many of his published works deal with personal historical figures, including biographies of Johan Albrecht Ehrenström and K. J. Ståhlberg, as well as judicial histories.

== Publications ==
- K.J. Ståhlberg (1969)
- Johan Albrecht Ehrenström (1963)
- Suomen historia, 4 (1986)
- Suomen itsenäisyys. Aatteita ja hankkeita 1700-luvulta 1900-luvulle (1967)
- Turun hovioikeus 1623 31/10 (1973)
- Laki, suku ja yksilö (1986)
