= Kannonkoski Church =

Church in Kannonkoski, Finland

Coordinates: 62°58′22″N 25°15′12″E

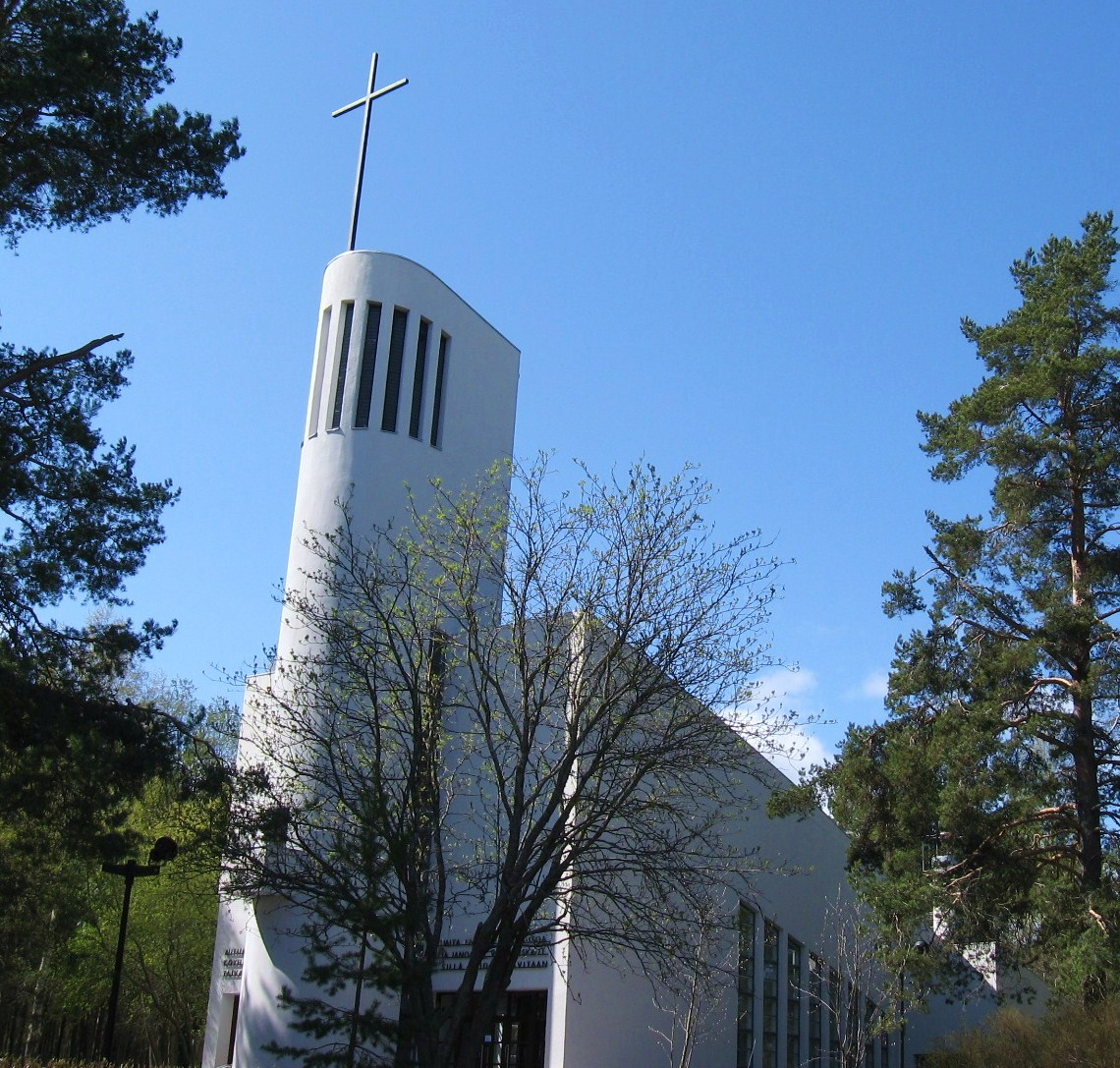
Kannonkoski Church

Kannonkoski Church (Finnish: Kannonkosken kirkko, Swedish: Kannonkoski kyrka) is a Lutheran church in Kannonkoski, Finland. The church was designed by Pauli E. Blomstedt and represents Functionalism architecturally. The church was built in 1937–1938. Blomstedt never saw his church finished: he died in 1935 and the church was finished according to instructions by his wife, architect Märta Blomstedt, and architect Matti Lampén.

The church is listed as a nationally significant built heritage site by the Finnish National Board of Antiquities. Docomomo has also selected it as a significant example of modern architecture in Finland.
