= Gunnar Taucher =

Finnish architect

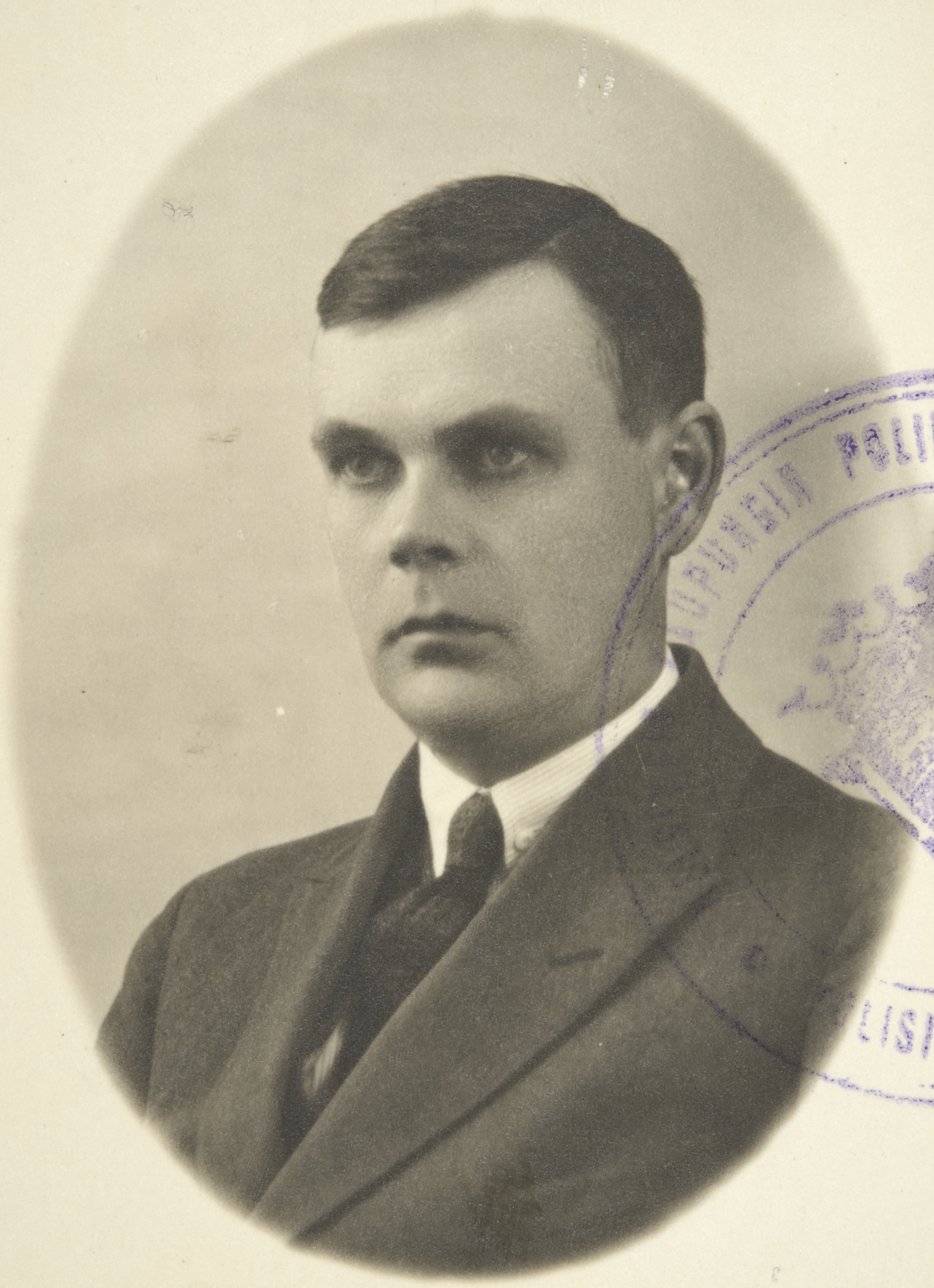
Gunnar Taucher.

Jarl Gunnar Taucher (Vaasa, 2 May 1886 — Helsinki, 15 March 1941), was a Finnish architect who first came to prominence in the first decades of the 20th century for his architecture designed in the style of Nordic Classicism, though later he turned to the Functionalist modernist style.

Taucher studied architecture at Helsinki University of Technology from 1904 to 1908. Among his first works, designed with colleagues Gösta Kajanus and Rafael Blomstedt during the 1910s, were modest single-family houses designed in the Helsinki suburb of Kulosaari. In 1913 Taucher began his career working for the City of Helsinki, reaching the position of City Architect in 1923. Helsinki had been suffering from a severe shortage of affordable housing and Taucher specialised in low-cost housing. He designed the first block of flats for tuberculosis sufferers, on Loviisankatu street (1924, extended in 1931). Taucher's most well-known achievement in municipal housing is at Makelankatu street 37–43 (1925–26); the buildings are regarded as one of the best examples of Nordic Classicism. The tripartite, three- and four-storey building of 160 metres long, dominates the centre of the working-class district of Vallila, and is concerned not only with housing provision but also with cityscape.

Taucher also designed several schools and educational buildings in Helsinki. His Finnish Language Adult Education Centre (1927) (which may haver had a significant input from his young talented assistant Pauli E. Blomstedt) is clearly still in the Nordic Classicism style, while the Käpylä primary school (1929) and the Aleksis Kivi Primary School (1934) are more pared-down examples of classicism compared to his early works, anticipating the move towards a more purist Modernism, shown in one of his later schools, the Lapinlahti school (1939). Other buildings (all in Helsinki) include the Helsinki Police station on Pieni Roobertinkatu 1–3 (1929), the Kivelä hospital (1935), the Alppila circular-shaped water tower (1938), and the Kamppi Electricity company premises (1939), which were later extended in the 1960s by architect Alvar Aalto. during the 1940s and 1950s, together with architect Hilding Ekelund, Taucher also designed the yellow kiosks in the Töölö area of Helsinki.

== Selection of works by Gunnar Taucher ==
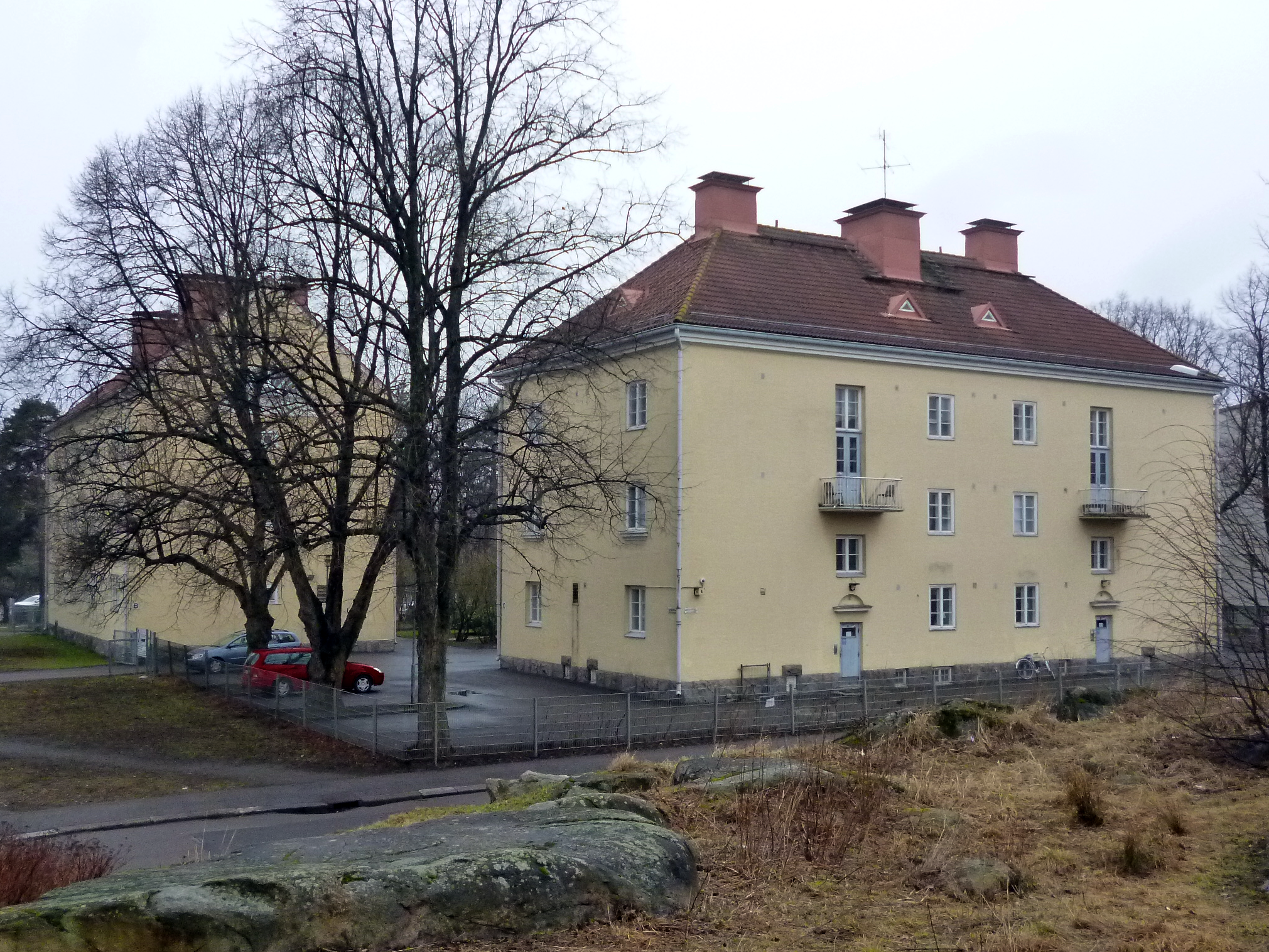
Housing for tuberculosis sufferers, Loviisankatu, Helsinki (1924–31)

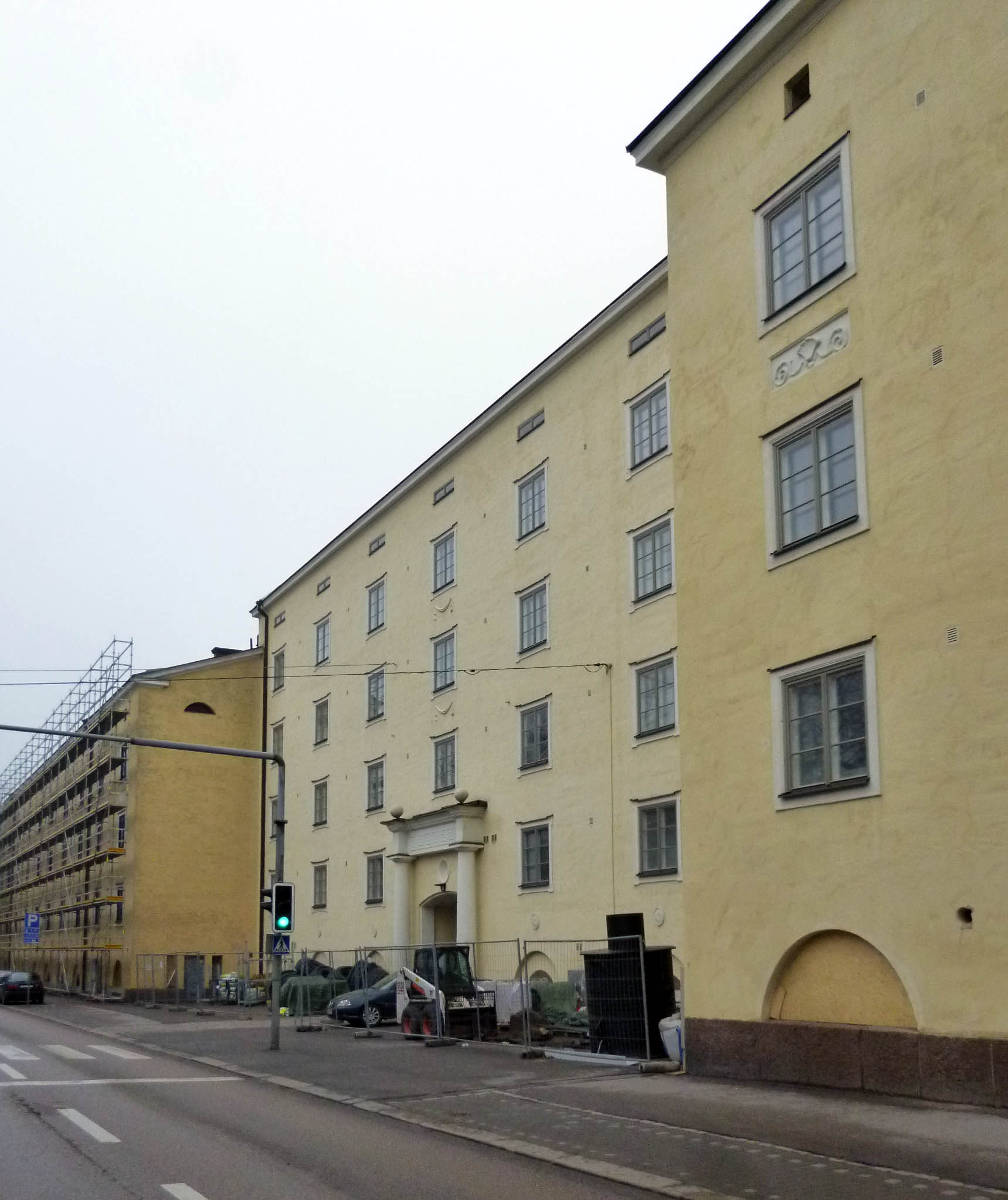
Workers' housing, Mäkelänkatu 37–43, Helsinki (1925–26)

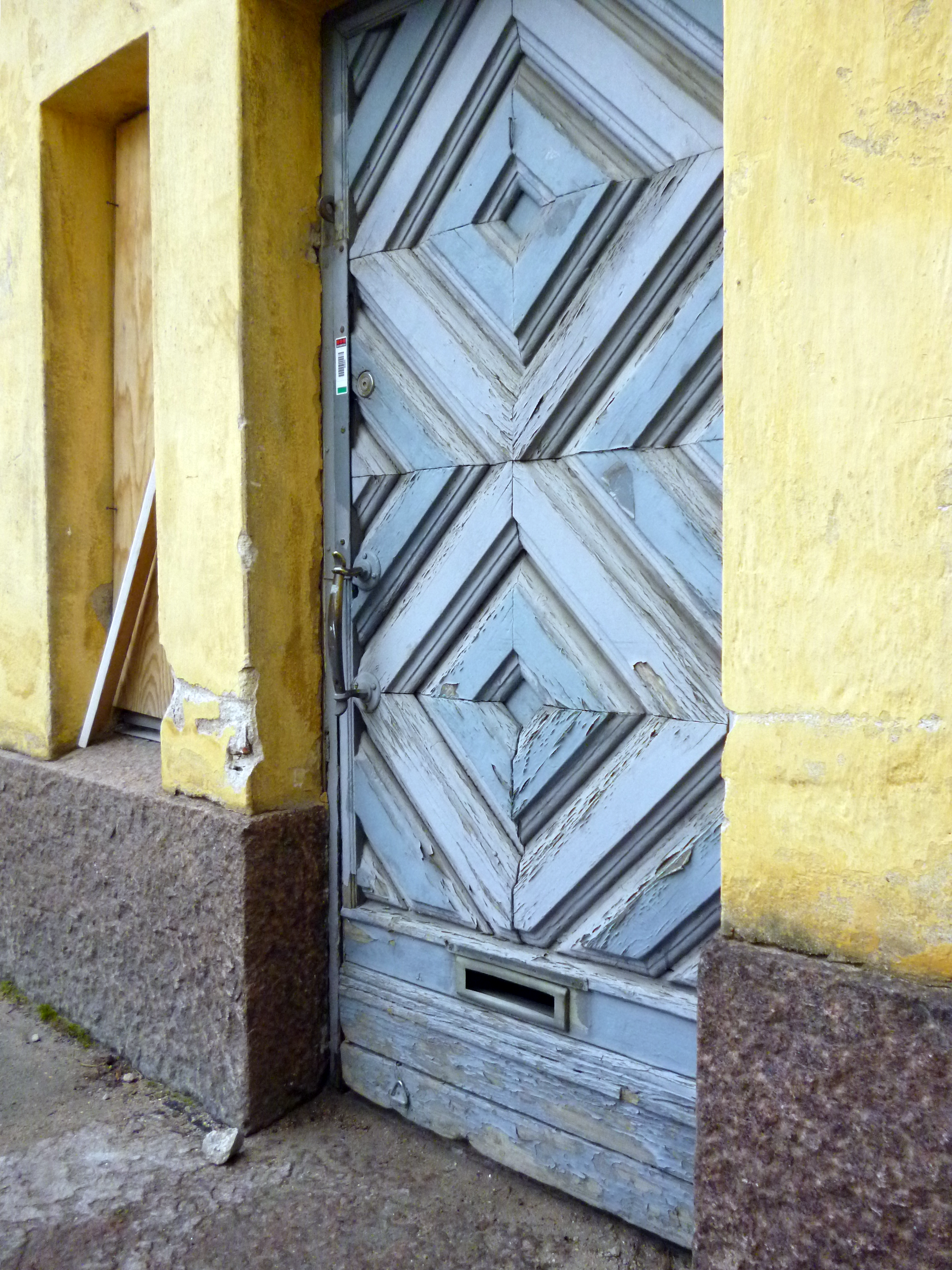
Door, Mäkelänkatu 37–43, Helsinki (1925–26)

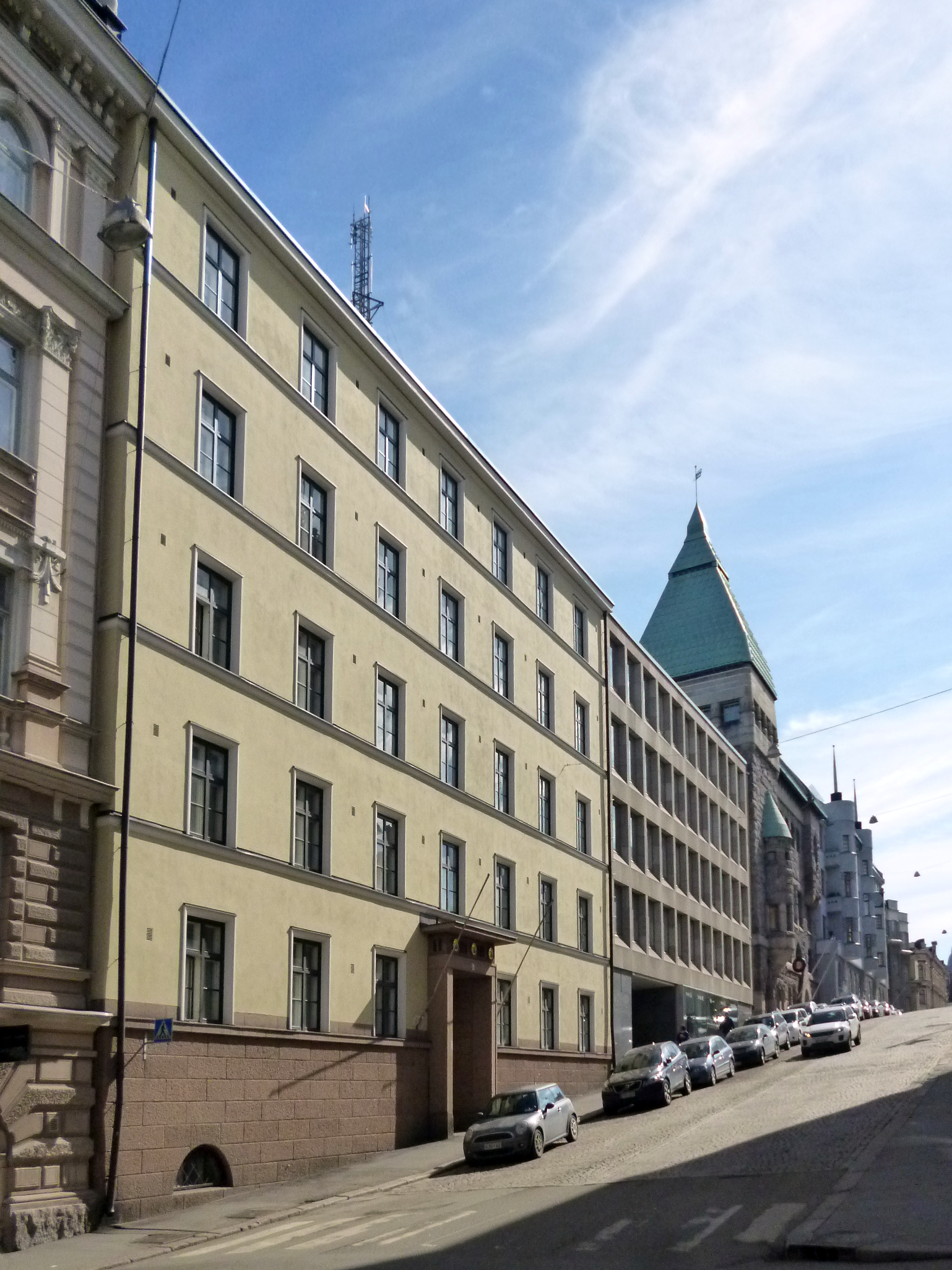
Korkeavuorenkatu 39, Helsinki (1929)

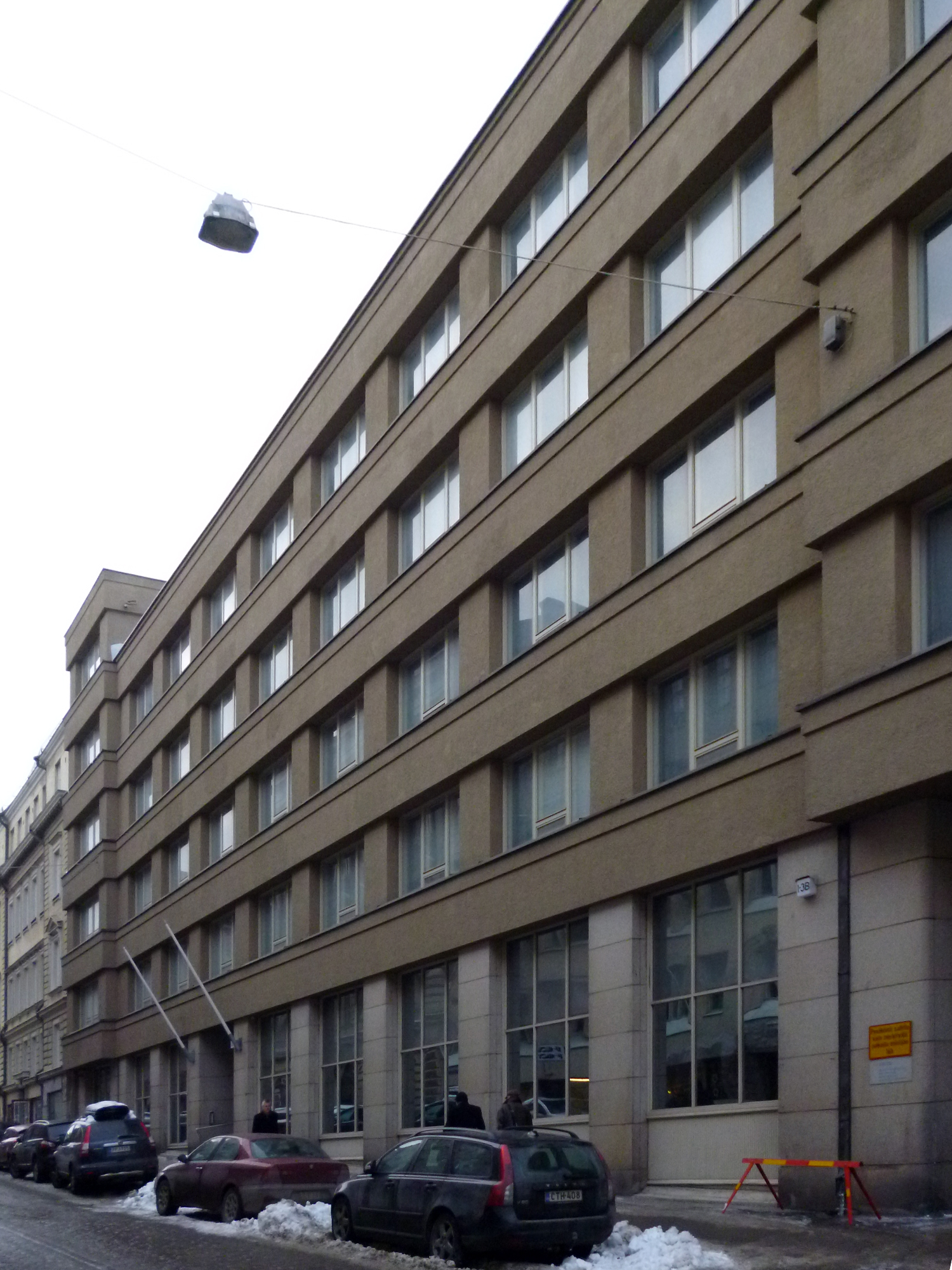
Pieni Robertinkatu 1–3, Helsinki (1929)

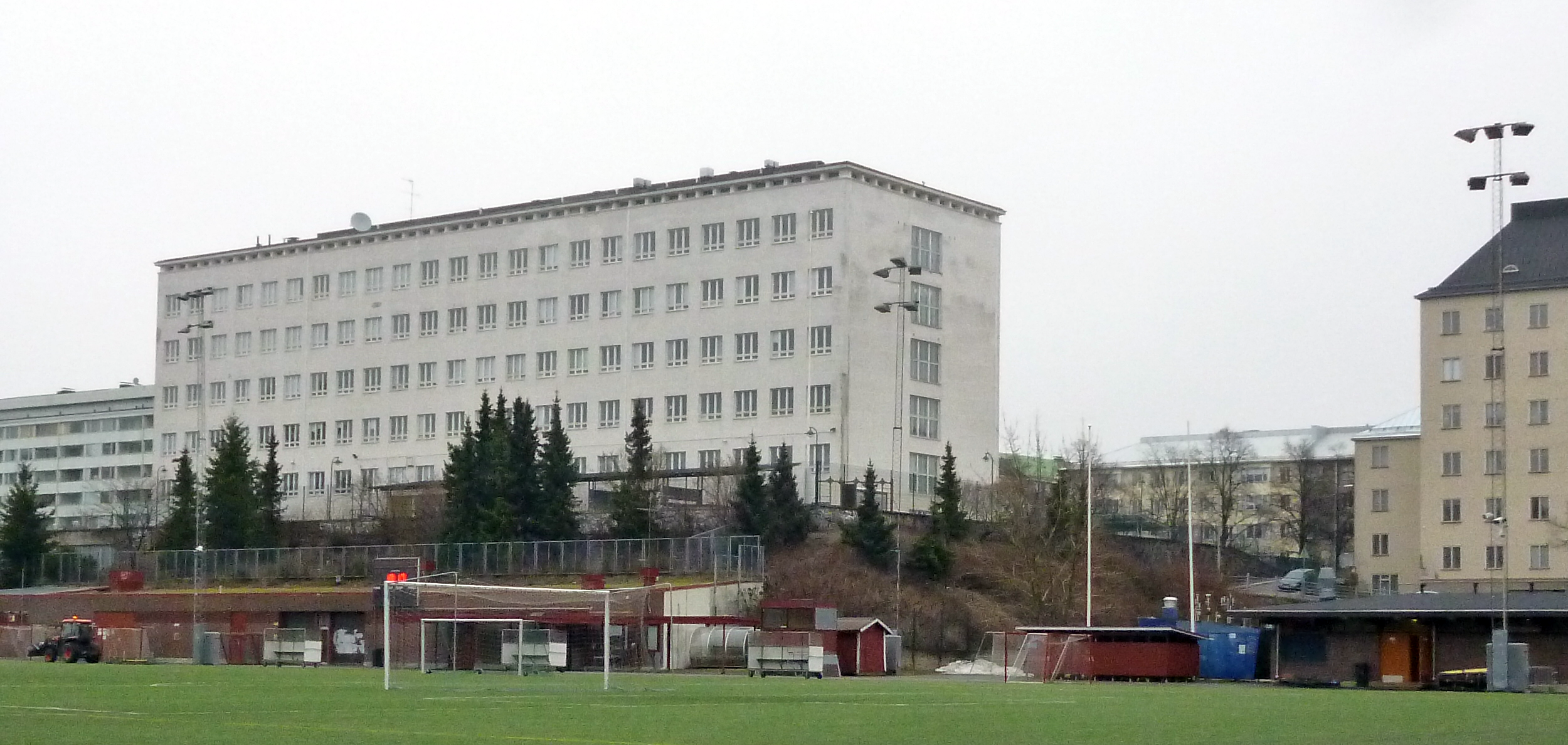
Aleksis Kivi School, Helsinki (1934)

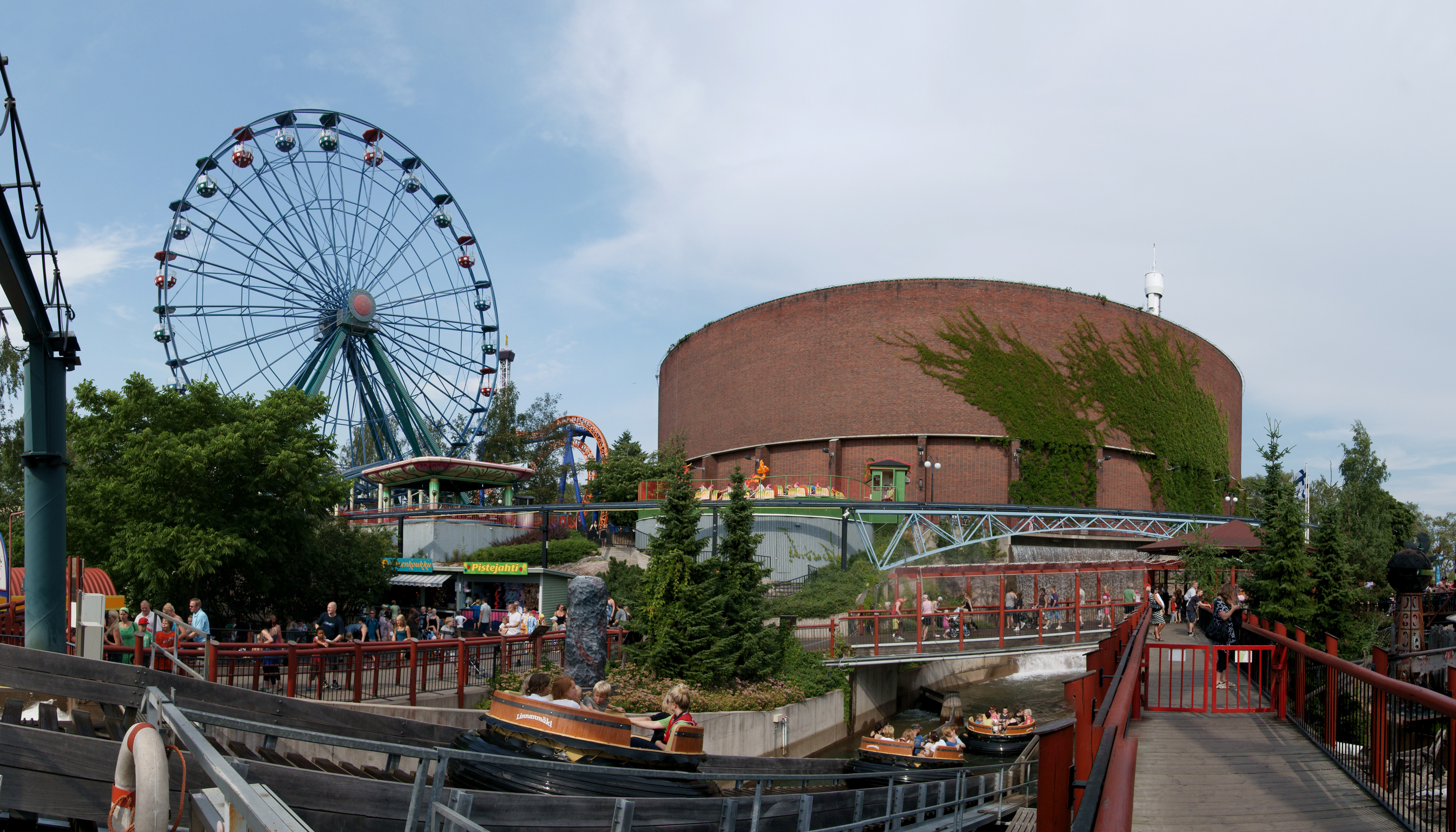
Alppila water tower, Helsinki (1938)

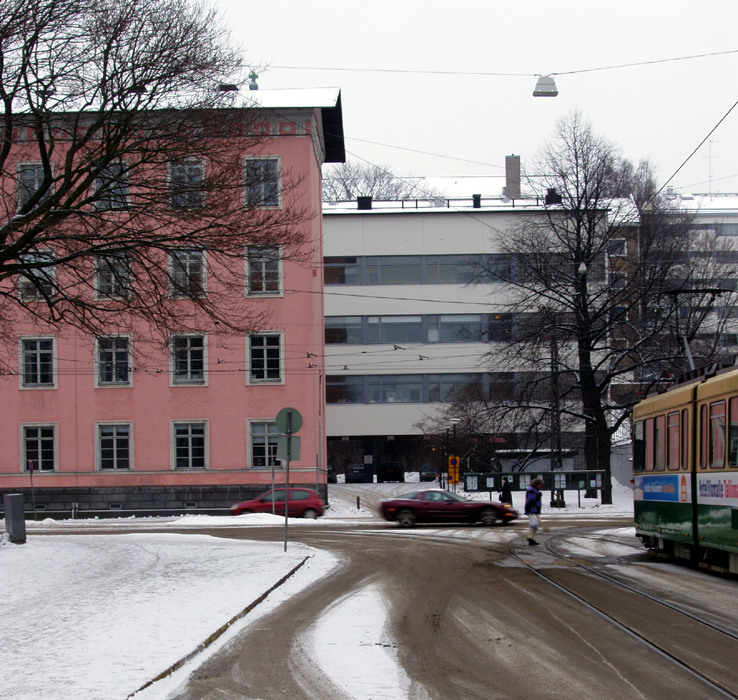
Finnish Language Adult Education Centre, Helsinki (1927), and extension by Aulis Blomstedt (1959)
