= Polyany =

Poliany or Polyany may refer to:

- Polyany, Leningrad Oblast, a settlement in Russia
- Polany, Lesser Poland Voivodeship, a village in Poland
- Polany, Podkarpackie Voivodeship, a village in Poland
- Polany Surowiczne, a former village in Poland
- Vyatskiye Polyany, a town in Kirov Oblast, Russia
- Polans (eastern), medieval East Slavic tribe, also called Poliany
- Polans (western), medieval West Slavic tribe, also called Poliany
- Polyany, Primorsky Krai, a settlement in Primorsky Krai, Russia
- Polyany, Ryazan Oblast, a village (selo) in Ryazan Oblast, Russia
