= Franciscan Church =

Franciscan Church (German: Franziskanerkirche is the name of several churches belonging to the Franciscans, e.g.:

== Austria ==
- Franciscan Church, Eisenstadt
- Franciscan Church, Graz
- Franciscan Church, Salzburg
- Franciscan Church, Vienna

== Croatia ==
- Franciscan Church and Friary, Dubrovnik
- Franciscan Church and Monastery, Zadar

== Germany ==
- Franciscan Church, Ingolstadt
- Franciscan Church, Überlingen

== Hungary ==
- Franciscan Church, Budapest
- Franciscan Church, Eger
- Franciscan Church, Gyöngyös
- Franciscan Church, Szeged

== Poland ==
- St. Francis of Assisi's Church, Kraków
- Franciscan Church, Zamość

== Romania ==
- Cluj-Napoca Franciscan Church
- Franciscan Church, Timișoara

== Serbia ==
- Franciscan Church, Bač

== Slovakia ==
- Franciscan Church, Bratislava
- St Anthony of Padua Church, Košice
- Franciscan Church, Trnava

== Slovenia ==
- Franciscan Church of the Annunciation

== Switzerland ==
- Franciscan Church, Lucerne
- Franciscan Church, Solothurn
