= Zamość =

- City county
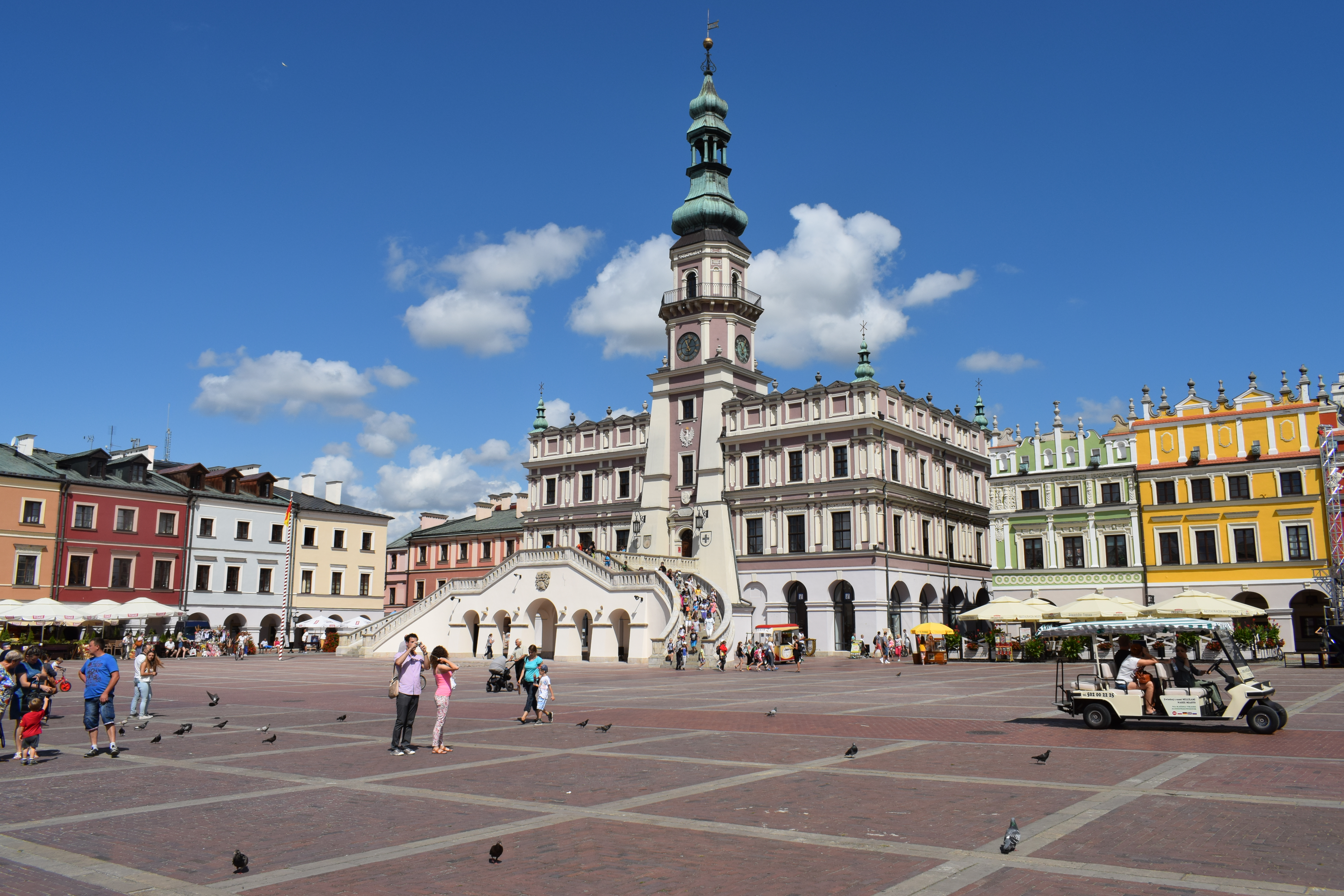
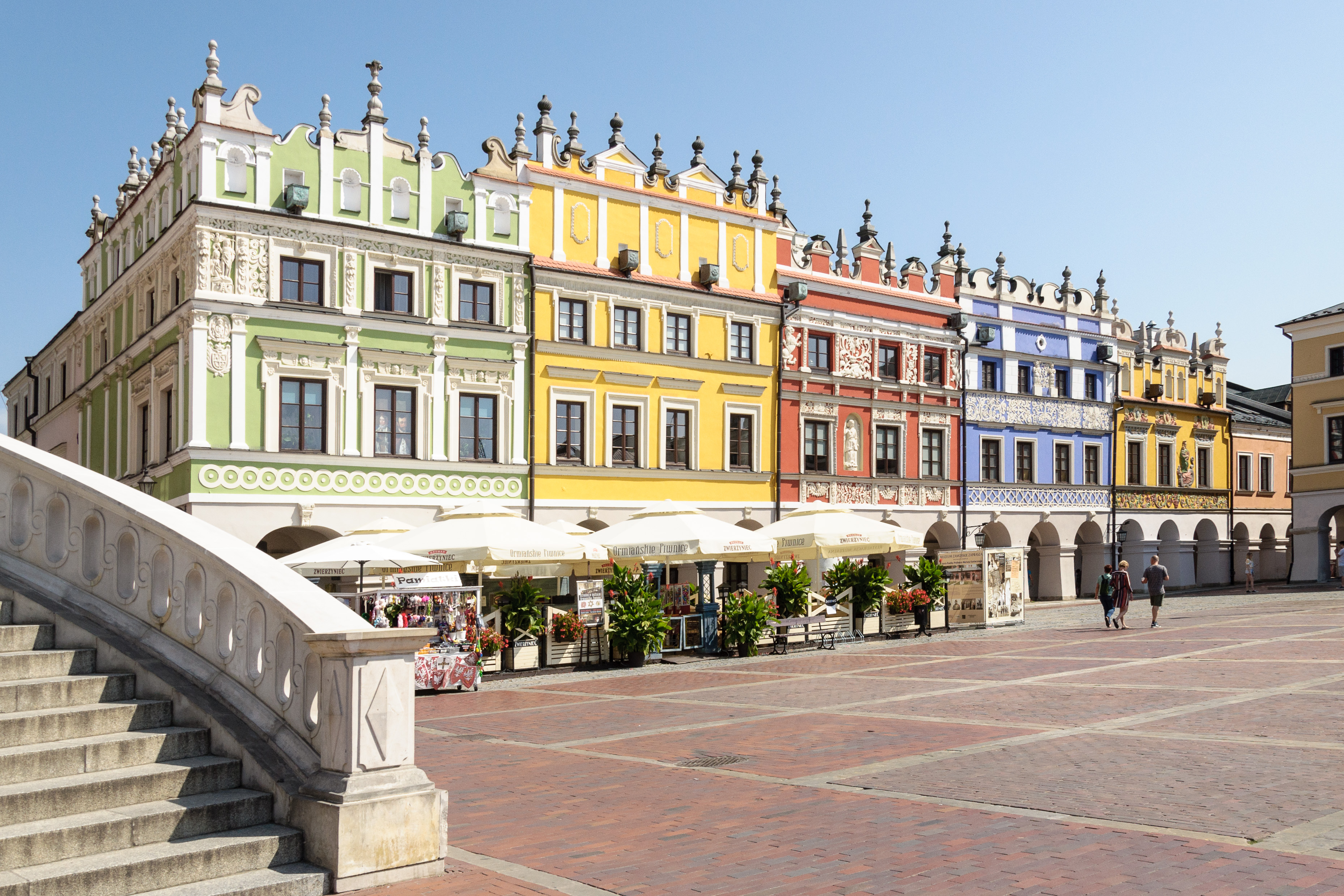
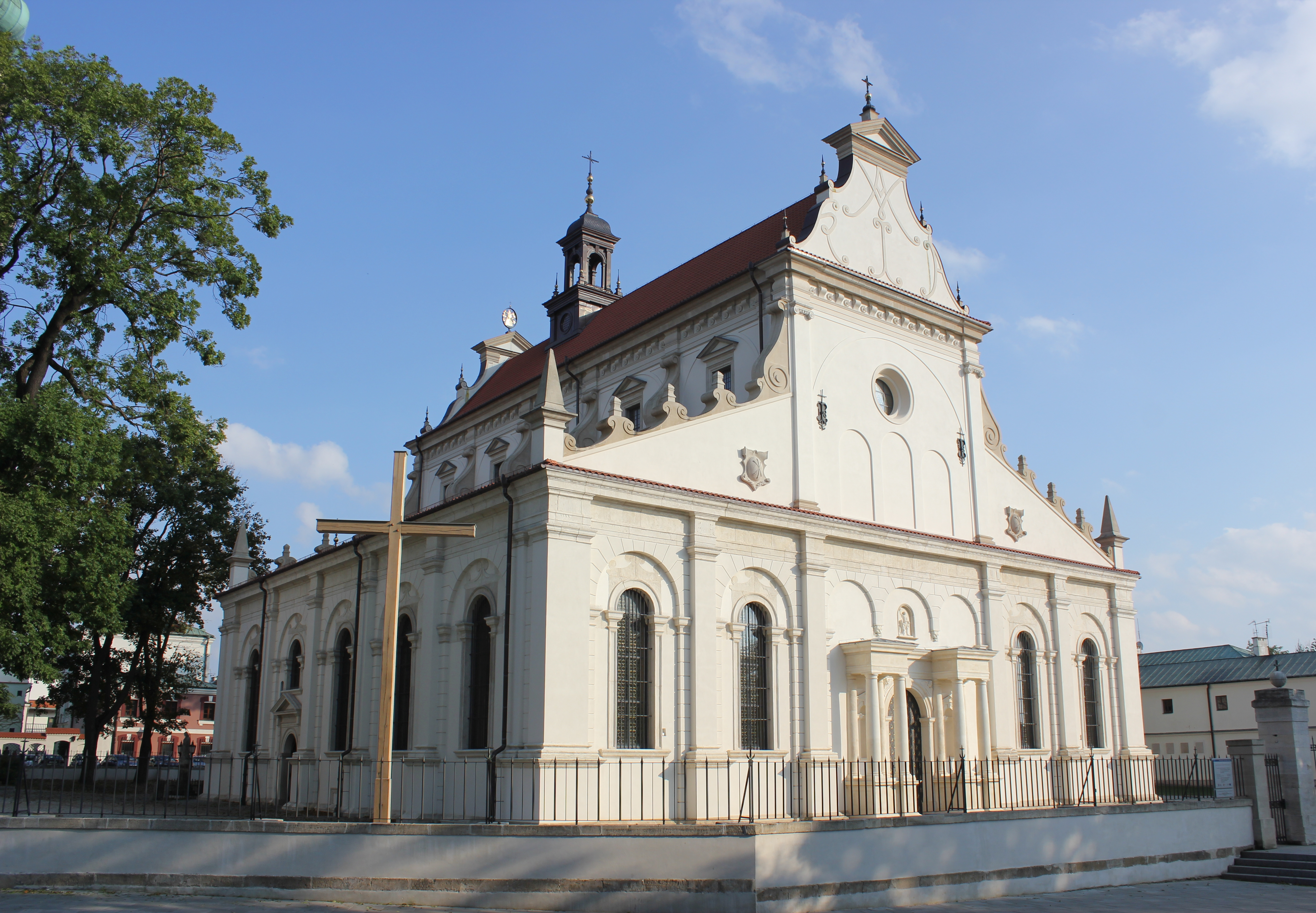
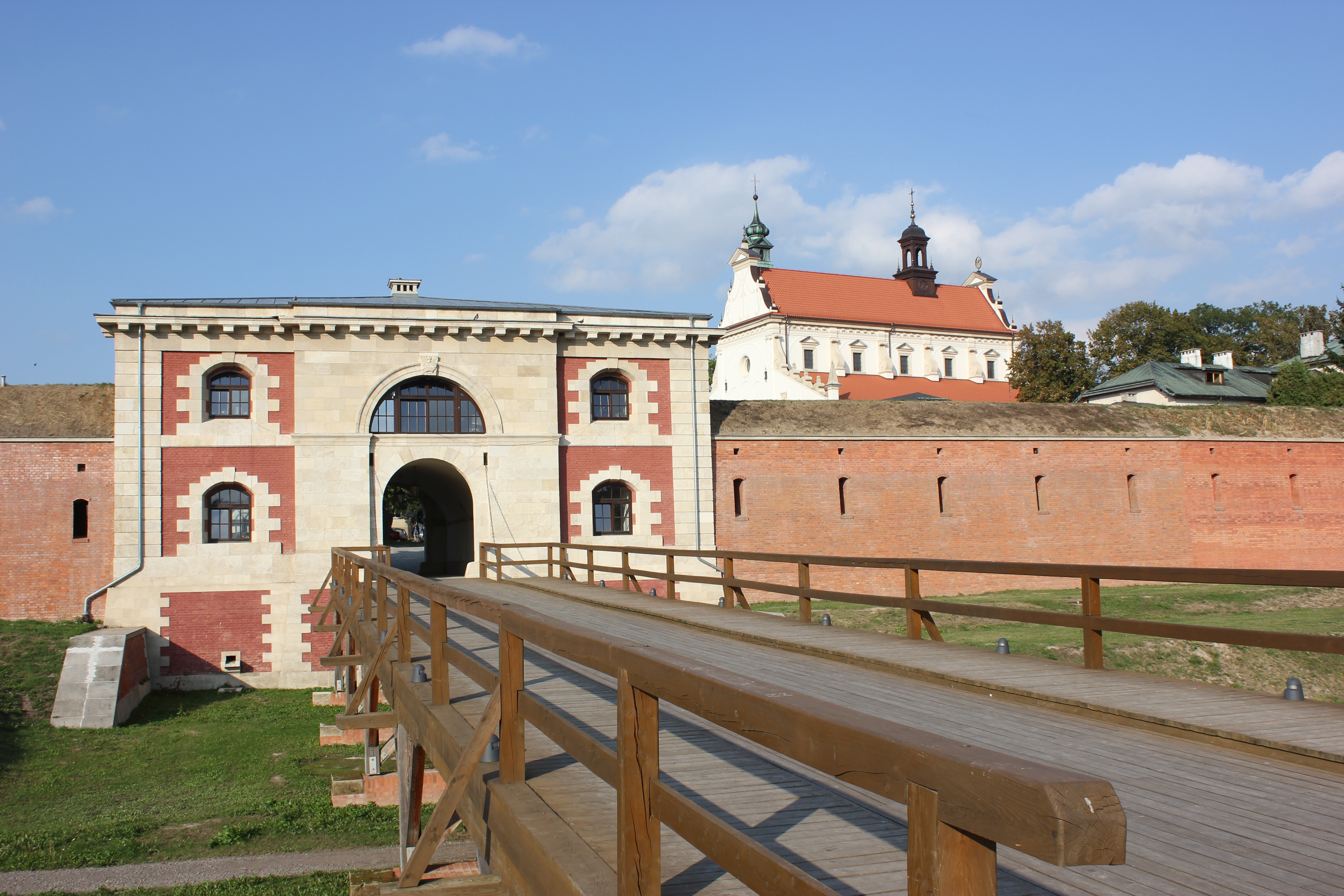
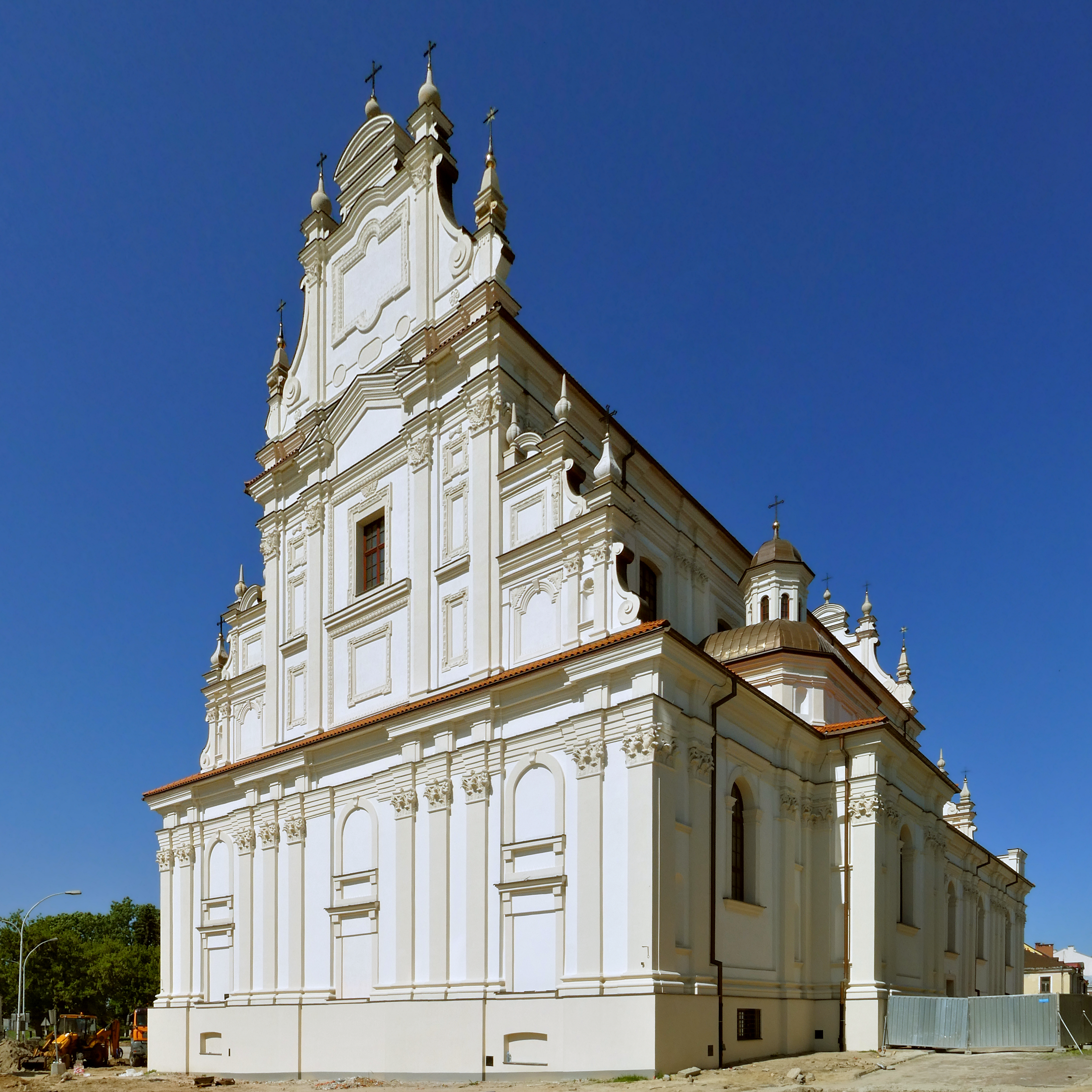
- Market Square and Town Hall Armenian Tenements Zamość Cathedral Zamość Fortress Franciscan Church

- Flag Coat of arms

- Location within Poland
- Coordinates: 50°43′00″N 23°15′10″E
- Country: Poland
- Voivodeship: Lublin
- Powiat: city county
- Established: 1580
- City rights: 1580
- Founder: Jan Zamoyski

Government
  - City mayor: Rafał Zwolak

Area
  - Total: 30.48 km^{2} (11.77 sq mi)
- Elevation: 212 m (696 ft)

Population (31 December 2021)
  - Total: 62,021 ▼
  - Density: 2,035/km^{2} (5,270/sq mi)
- Time zone: UTC+1 (CET)
  - Summer (DST): UTC+2 (CEST)
- Postal code: 22–400 to 22–410
- Area code: (+48) 084
- Car plates: LZ
- Website: www.zamosc.pl

UNESCO World Heritage Site
- Official name: Old City of Zamość
- Type: Cultural
- Criteria: iv
- Designated: 1992
- Reference no.: 564
- UNESCO region: Europe
- Area: 75.0391 ha
- Buffer zone: 214.916 ha

Zamość (Polish: [ˈzamɔɕt͡ɕ]; Yiddish: זאמאשטש, romanized: Zamoshtsh; Latin: Zamoscia) is a historical city in southeastern Poland. It is situated in the southern part of Lublin Voivodeship, about 90 km (56 mi) from Lublin, 247 km (153 mi) from Warsaw. In 2021, the population of Zamość was 62,021.

Zamość was founded in 1580 by Jan Zamoyski, Grand Chancellor of Poland, who envisioned an ideal city. The historical centre of Zamość was added to the UNESCO World Heritage List in 1992, following a decision of the sixteenth ordinary session of the World Heritage Committee, held between 7 and 14 December 1992 in Santa Fe, New Mexico, United States; it was recognized for being "a unique example of a Renaissance town in Central Europe".

Zamość is about 20 kilometres (12 miles) from the Roztocze National Park.

== History ==
Zamość was founded in 1580 by the Chancellor and Hetman (head of the army of the Polish–Lithuanian Commonwealth), Jan Zamoyski, on the trade route linking western and northern Europe with the Black Sea. Modelled on Italian trading cities, and built during the late-renaissance period by the Paduan architect Bernardo Morando, Zamość remains a perfect example of a Renaissance town of the late 16th century. It retains its original street layout, fortifications (Zamość Fortress), and a large number of original buildings blending Venetian and central European architectural traditions.

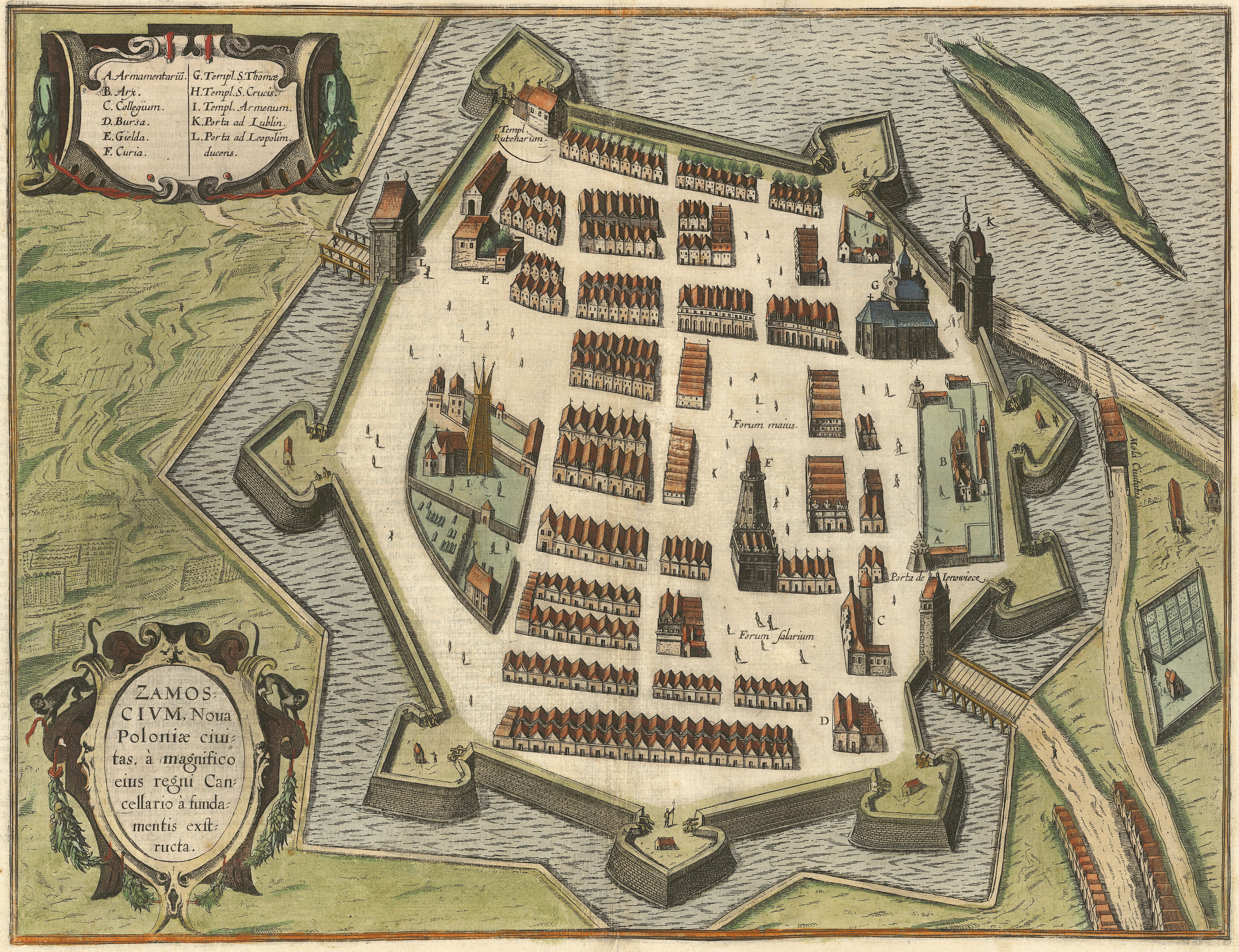
Zamość in 1617

In the 16th century, the city thrived during its most extensive and fastest period of development. It attracted not only Poles but also other nationalities. In 1594, Jan Zamoyski founded the Zamoyski Academy in Zamość. The city, however, faced numerous invasions, including a Cossack siege led by Bohdan Khmelnytsky, the leader of the uprising against the Polish–Lithuanian Commonwealth (1648–1654), and another siege during the Swedish Deluge in 1656. The Swedish army, like the Cossacks, failed to capture the city. Only during the Great Northern War was Zamość occupied, by Swedish and Saxon troops.

In the First Partition of Poland in 1772 the city was annexed by the Habsburg monarchy, forming part of the newly established Kingdom of Galicia and Lodomeria; the kingdom became a crown land of the Austrian Empire upon its formation in 1804. Following the Austro-Polish War of 1809 the city was incorporated into the short-lived Polish Duchy of Warsaw. The 17th Polish Infantry Regiment was formed in Zamość in 1809. In 1815, the Congress of Vienna dissolved the duchy and made Zamość part of the Kingdom of Poland, also called Congress Poland, which was controlled by the Russian Empire. The city played a considerable role during the November Uprising in 1830–1831 and surrendered as the last Polish resistance point. The fortress was demolished in 1866, allowing the rapid growth of the city beyond its original limits. During the final stages of World War I, in 1918, local Poles liberated the city from foreign occupation, shortly before Poland officially regained independence.

=== World War II ===
In September 1939, after the outbreak of World War II, German Luftwaffe planes bombed Zamość several times. Over 250 people were killed, mainly civilians. In early September 1939, the Polish government evacuated a portion of the Polish gold reserve from Warsaw to Zamość, and then further southeast to Śniatyn at the Poland-Romania border, from where it was transported via Romania and Turkey to territory controlled by Polish-allied France. The city was overrun by the Germans during the invasion of Poland and the local garrison, staffed by the Polish infantry regiment of podpułkownik Stanisław Gumowski, was defeated. On September 27, 1939, Nazi Germany signed a border treaty with the Soviet Union which had invaded Poland from the east, and, consequently, on September 28, 1939, Zamość was briefly handed over to the Red Army. The Soviets withdrew on October 5, 1939, along with some 5,000 Jews after a further demarcation line adjustment. The Germans returned to the city on October 8, 1939 and shortly afterwards mass arrests of prominent citizens began. This was as part of the secret A-B Action, the deliberate extermination of Polish intellectuals. The German Nazis created an execution site in the Zamość Rotunda, Gestapo camp, (in German: Gefangenen-Durchgangslager Sicherheitspol, in English: "The transit camp for Security Police prisoners"). More than 8,000 people were massacred there, including displaced residents of the region. In Zamość, Nazi Germans also created a "Transit Camp" on Okrzei Street, for arrested and displaced inhabitants of the Zamość region (including thousands of children) and camps of Soviet prisoners of war captured during Operation Barbarossa.

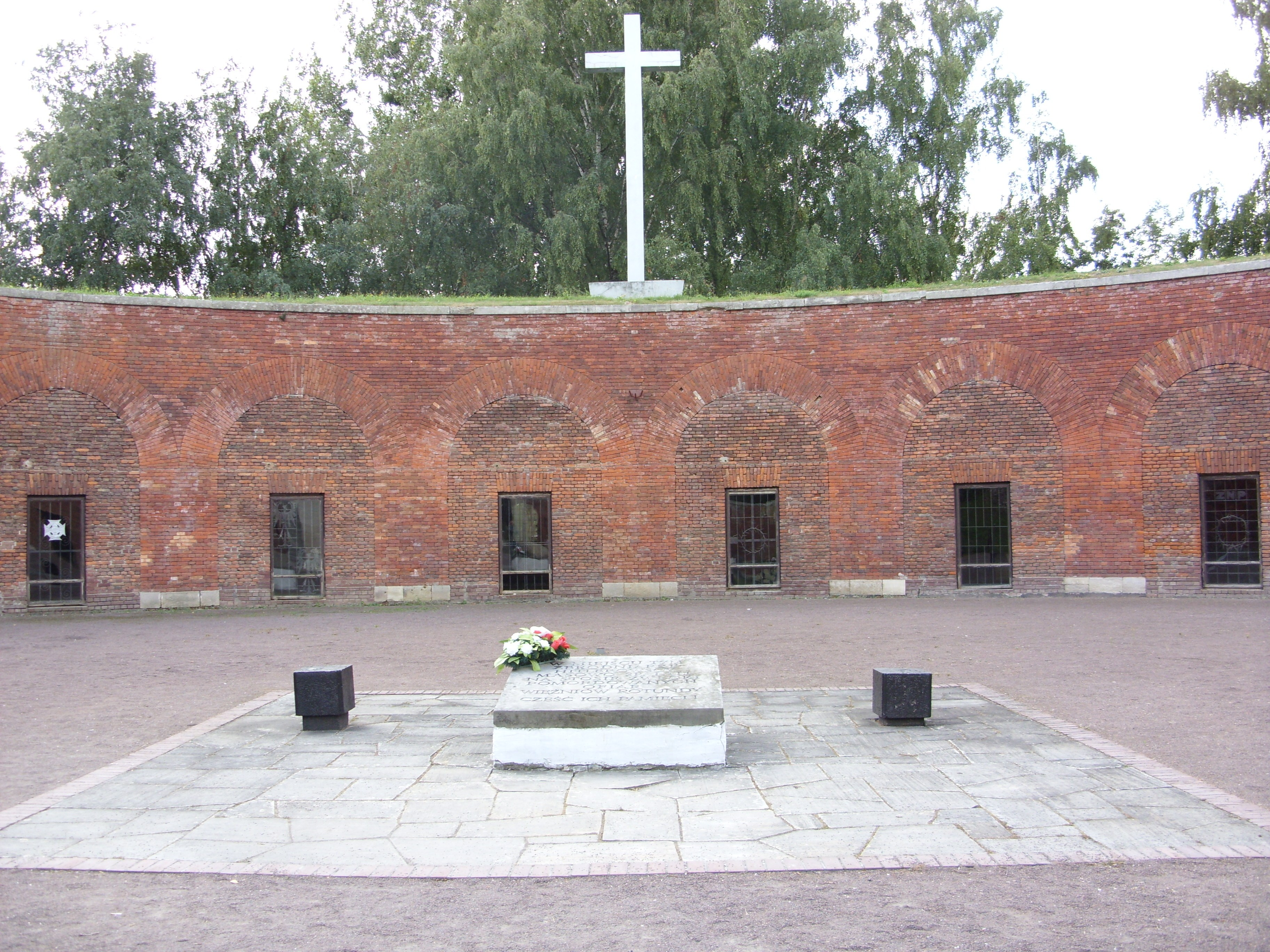
The Zamość Rotunda, Gestapo camp, place of martyrdom of the population of the Zamość region 1940–1944, during World War II

In 1942, Zamość County, due to its fertile black soil, was chosen for further German colonization in the General Government as part of Generalplan Ost, with the new name of Himmlerstadt, after Heinrich Himmler. The name was later changed to Pflugstadt (Plow City), a reference to the German "plow" that was to "plow the East". Neither name endured.

Local people resisted the German occupiers with great determination; they escaped into the forests, organised self-defence, gave help to those who were expelled, and rescued kidnapped Polish children from German hands by bribery (see Zamość Uprising). The Nazis found it difficult to find many families suitable for settlement in the area, and those who did settle often fled in fear, because the former Polish residents would burn down houses or kill their inhabitants.

In 1942–1943, tens of thousands of inhabitants of the region were ethnically cleansed by the Nazi occupiers, to make space for German settlers in order to ensure Germanisation of the area. Most former inhabitants were deported to forced labor camps in Germany, Nazi concentration camps or extermination camps such as Auschwitz, Majdanek and Bełżec.

=== Post-war period ===
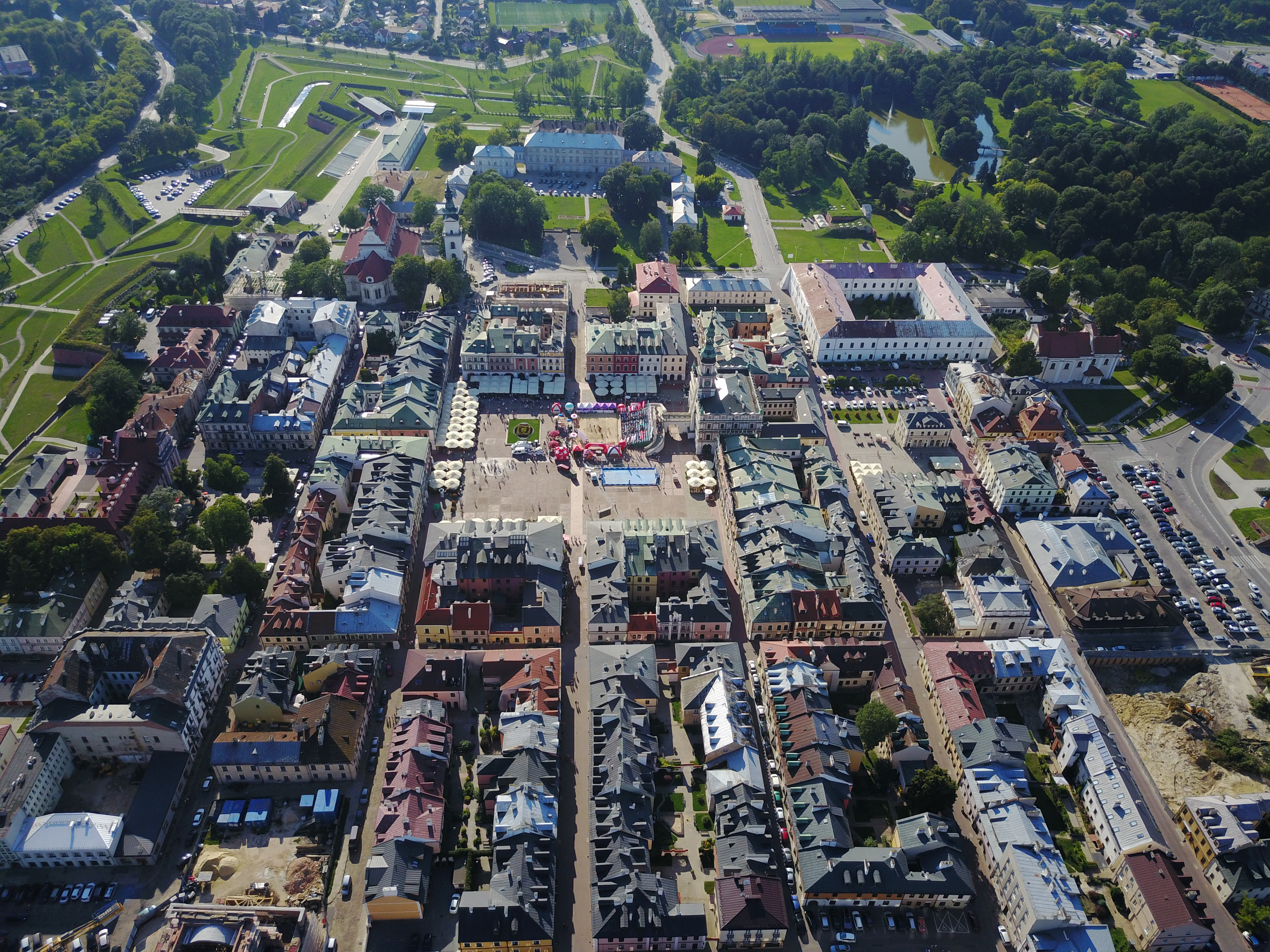
Aerial view of the Old City of Zamość

After World War II, Zamość began a period of development. In the 1970s and 1980s the population grew rapidly (from 39,100 in 1975 to 68,800 in 2003), as the city started to gain significant profits from the old trade routes linking Germany with Ukraine and the ports on the Black Sea. During the years 1975–1998 Zamość was the capital of Zamość Voivodeship.

=== Jewish Community ===
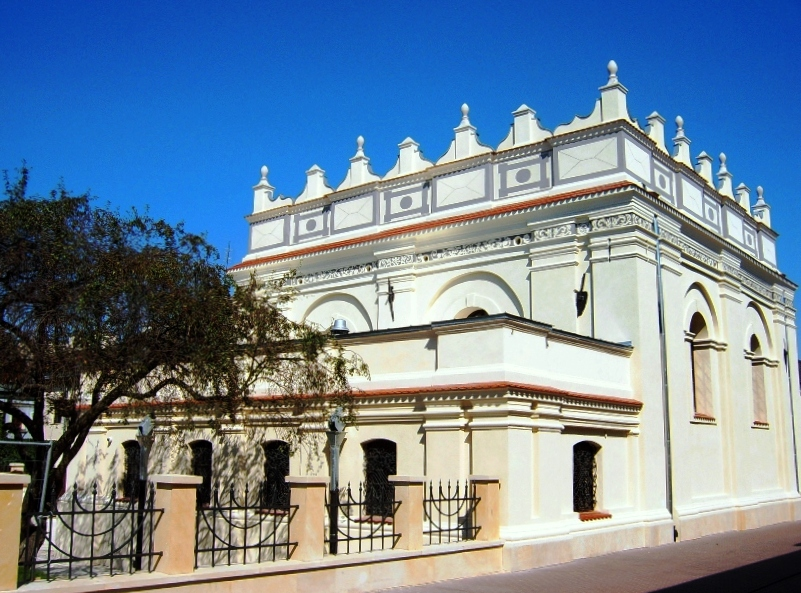
Zamość Synagogue from 1618 is a prime example of Polish Renaissance architecture

The Qahal of Zamość was founded in 1588 when Jan Zamoyski agreed to Jewish settlement in the city. The first Jewish settlers were mainly Sephardi Jews coming from Italy, Spain, Portugal and Turkey. In the 17th century, Ashkenazi Jews also settled in the city and soon became the majority of the Jewish population. The settlement rights given by Jan Zamoyski were re-confirmed in 1684 by Marcin Zamoyski, the fourth Ordynat of the Zamość estate.

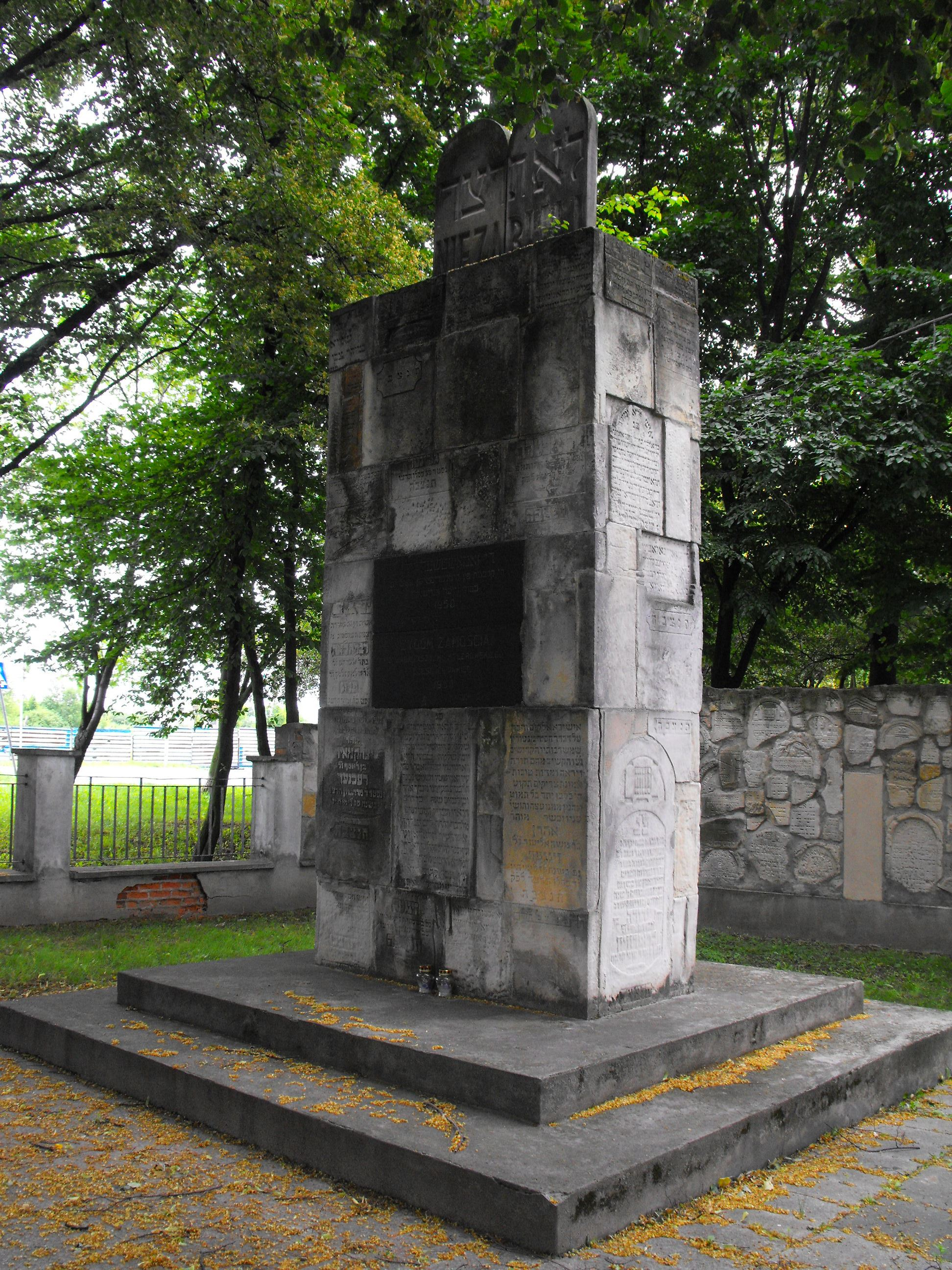
Monument to Jews of Zamość who were murdered in the Holocaust

At the turn of the 18th and 19th centuries, the Jewish inhabitants were influenced by the Jewish Enlightenment, or Haskalah. Rabbis forbade the entry of Hasids into Zamosc, until the late nineteenth century. In Zamość there was a Jewish synagogue, two houses of worship, a ritual bathhouse, a hospital and a slaughterhouse. The best preserved remnant of the Jewish community is the now restored Zamość Synagogue. Zamość was home to many prominent Jews, including poet Solomon Ettinger (1799–1855) and writer Isaac Leib Peretz. In 1827, 2,874 Jews lived in the city and this had risen by 1900 to 7,034. The increase continued, so that by 1921 the Jewish population stood at 9,383 (49.3% of the total population), including significant landowners within the city.

On the eve of World War II, more than 12,500 Jews lived in Zamość; 43 percent of the population of 28,100. Soon after the handing over to the Germans by the Soviet Union on October 8, 1939, the Nazis instituted the Judenrat, through which to control the Jews, and in December 1939 created an open ghetto in the Nowa Osada neighbourhood.

Jews deported from the newly formed Warthegau province in German-annexed western Poland were transported to Zamość and in April 1941 the ghetto was moved to the New Town and 7,000 Jews were ordered to relocate there. The ghetto was not enclosed and many Jews escaped to the Soviet Union. It was liquidated before the end of November 1942; deportations had begun in April, with some 3,000 Jews sent to the Bełżec extermination camp in a Holocaust train consisting of 30 cattle cars. In October, the Nazis shot 500 Jews in the streets and deported 4,000 Jewish prisoners via the Izbica Ghetto transfer point to Bełżec for gassing. They were transported without any food or water. Although the distance was relatively short, the transports would take several days, and many died en route. The secret Polish Council to Aid Jews "Żegota", established by the Polish resistance movement operated in the city.

== Architecture ==
Most historic buildings are located in the Old Town, whose main distinguishing features have been retained. It includes the regular Great Market Square (Rynek Wielki) of 100 x 100 metres with the splendid Town Hall (Ratusz) and the so-called "Armenian houses", as well as fragments of the original fortress and fortifications, including those of the Russian occupation in the 19th century. (The destroyed sections of fortifications have been largely rebuilt to restore the city's appearance.) It is often called "the new Padua".

Jan Zamoyski commissioned the Venetian (from Padua) architect Bernardo Morando to design the city, based upon the anthropomorphic concept. Its "head" was to be the Zamoyski Palace, "backbone" Grodzka Street, crossing the Great Market Square from east to west, in the direction of the palace, and with the "arms" embodied by 10 streets intersecting the main streets: Solna Street (north of the Great Market Square) and Bernardo Morando Street (south of the Great Market Square). In these streets, the other squares were placed: Salt Square (Rynek Solny) and Water Square (Rynek Wodny), functioning as the "internal organs" of the city whereas the bastions are the "hands and legs" for self-defence.

The most prominent building is the Town Hall, built at the turn of the 16th and 17th centuries, following Bernardo Morando's design. In 1639–1651, Jan Jaroszewicz and Jan Wolff redesigned the structure. They enlarged the edifice and added three storeys with a high parapet. The façades were built in accordance with Mannerist proportions, regular divisions and excessive architectural décor. The 18th century witnessed the construction of a guardroom and a fan-shaped double stairway, built in front of the building. In 1770 a slender dome with a lantern was added to the top of the tower.

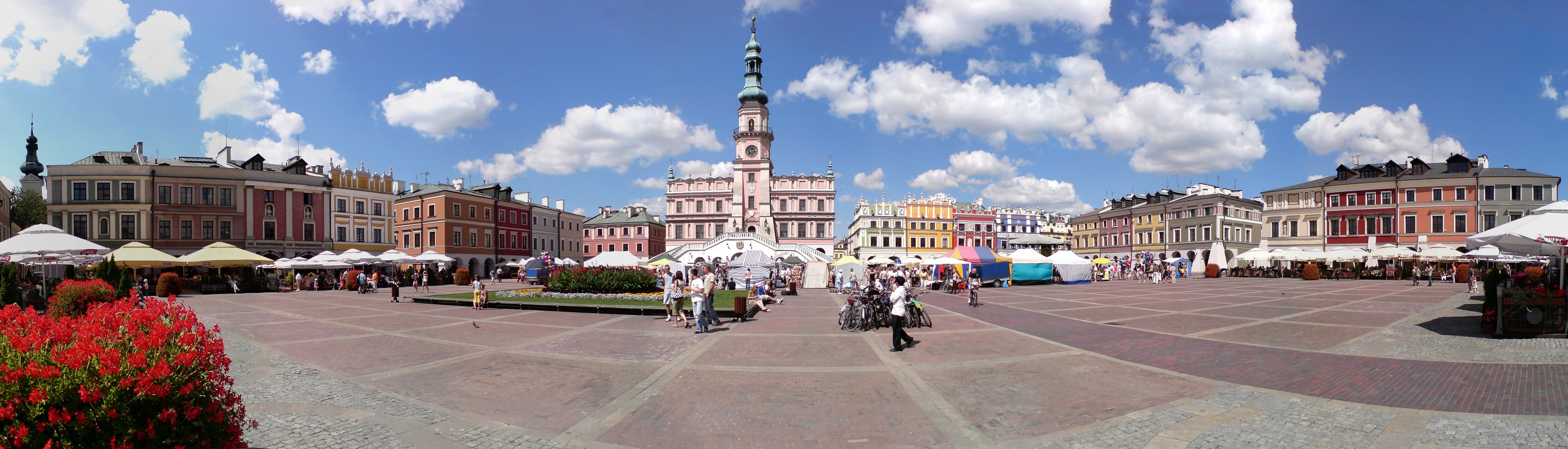
Panorama of the Great Market

The Town Hall stands on the north side of the Great Market Square, regarded as one of the most beautiful 16th-century squares in Europe. It is surrounded by a complex of arcaded houses built by the richest Zamość merchants. It is a square, measuring about 100 metres in both width and length, crossed by the two main axes of the old town. The 600-metre longitudinal axis goes east–west: from Bastion No. 7 to the Zamoyski Palace. The 400-metre crosswise axis goes north–south, linking the Great Market Square with the two smaller market squares: Solny and Wodny.

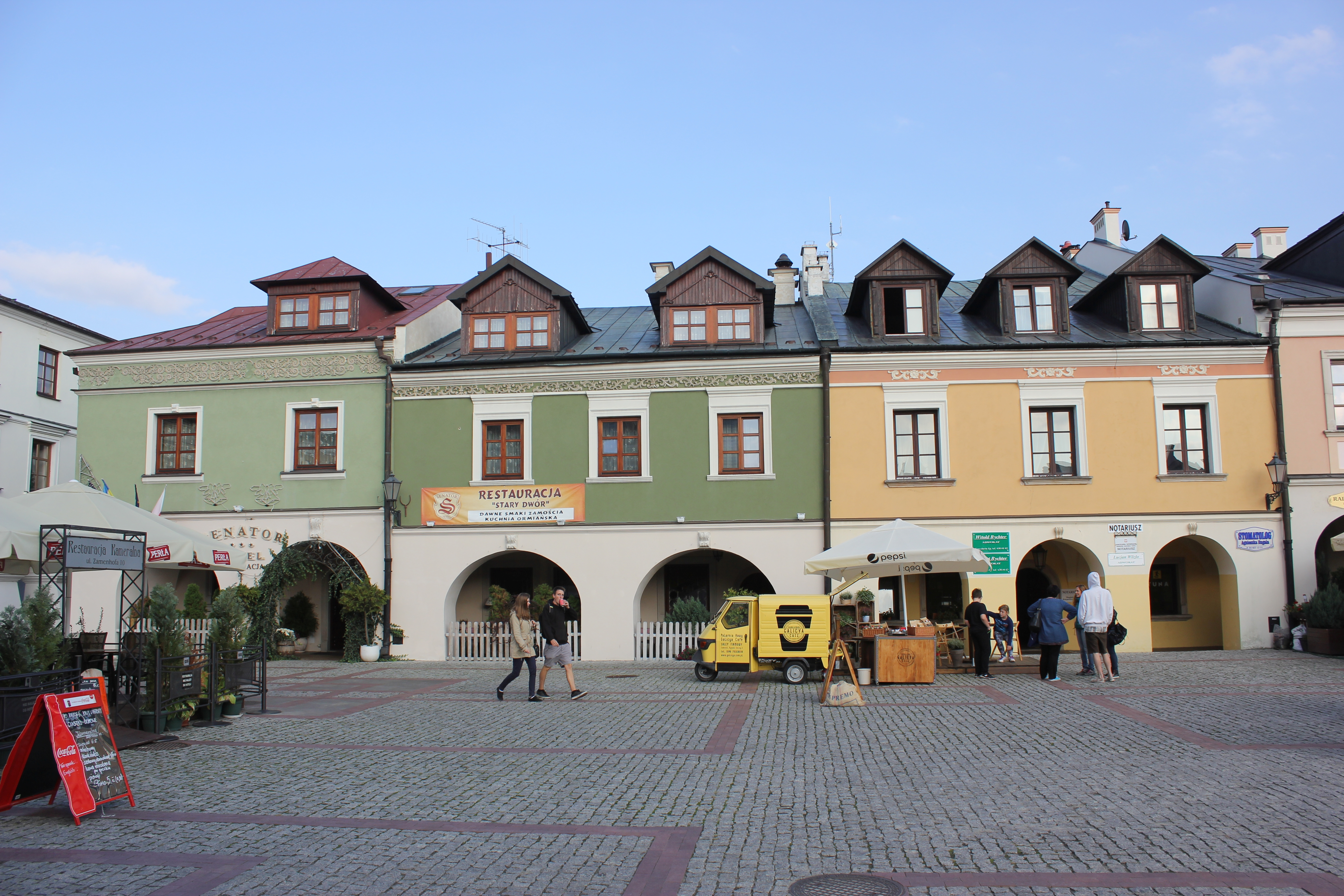
Solny Square (Plac Solny)

The red "Under the Angel" House at 26 Ormiańska street (Armenian street) was built in the early 1630s by a rich Armenian merchant, Gabriel Bartoszewicz. It is embellished with a carved figure of the founder's saint patron, the Archangel Gabriel holding a lily. The walls of the second floor are decorated with lions and a dragon, illustrating that the lions should protect the house against the evil embodied by the dragon. The house is the seat of the Zamość Museum.

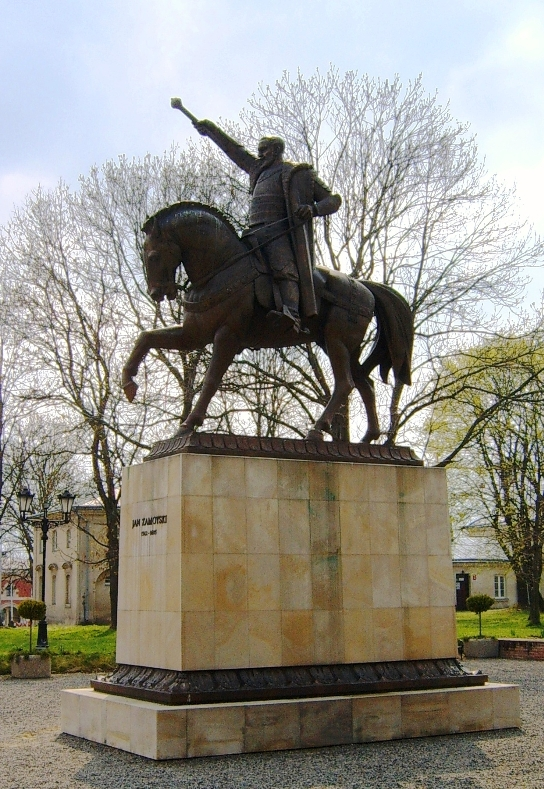
The statue of Jan Zamoyski, the founder of the city

The brightly coloured houses are vital to the square's character. The yellow "Under The Madonna" House at 22 Ormiańska street (Armenian Street) features the Madonna with the baby Jesus; showing the Madonna standing on a dragon. Built by a Lwów merchant, Sołtan Sachwelowicz, in the 17th century, the house has been refurbished recently to expose its façade. A high parapet has been reconstructed on the basis of old photographs. At present the house is the venue of the Bernardo Morando Fine Arts State Secondary School.

The "Under St. Casimir" House was erected in the 17th century and was owned alternately by Polish chemists and Armenian merchants. The façade of the house is embellished with a figure of St. Casimir, the saint patron of the new owner – Kazimierz Lubecki.

Built at the beginning of the 17th century, the green Wilczek House at 30 Ormiańska Street (Armenian Street) displays a Baroque decor, including a relief featuring St. John the Baptist and St. Thomas the Apostle with three spears. The house was remodelled in 1665–1674 by Jan Wilczek, a town councillor.

The blue "Under The Married Couple" House, also known as the "Sapphire" House, at 24 Ormiańska street (Armenian Street) was built in the second quarter of the 17th century by an Armenian merchant, Torosz. The façade includes a geometrical and plant frieze whereas the parapet is decorated with grotesque figures of a married couple.

The Link House at 5 Rynek Wielki street (Great Market Street) was erected at the end of the 17th century with all the features of the Baroque style. A Polish architect Jan Michał Link decorated the façade of the house with fluted Ionic columns. The tops of the windows were embellished with the carved busts of two mythological warriors: Minerva wearing a basinet and Hercules dressed in lion skins. Under the windows there is a frieze featuring laurel and palm branches – symbols of glory and victory. The pilasters include wall-trophies – weapons and armours.

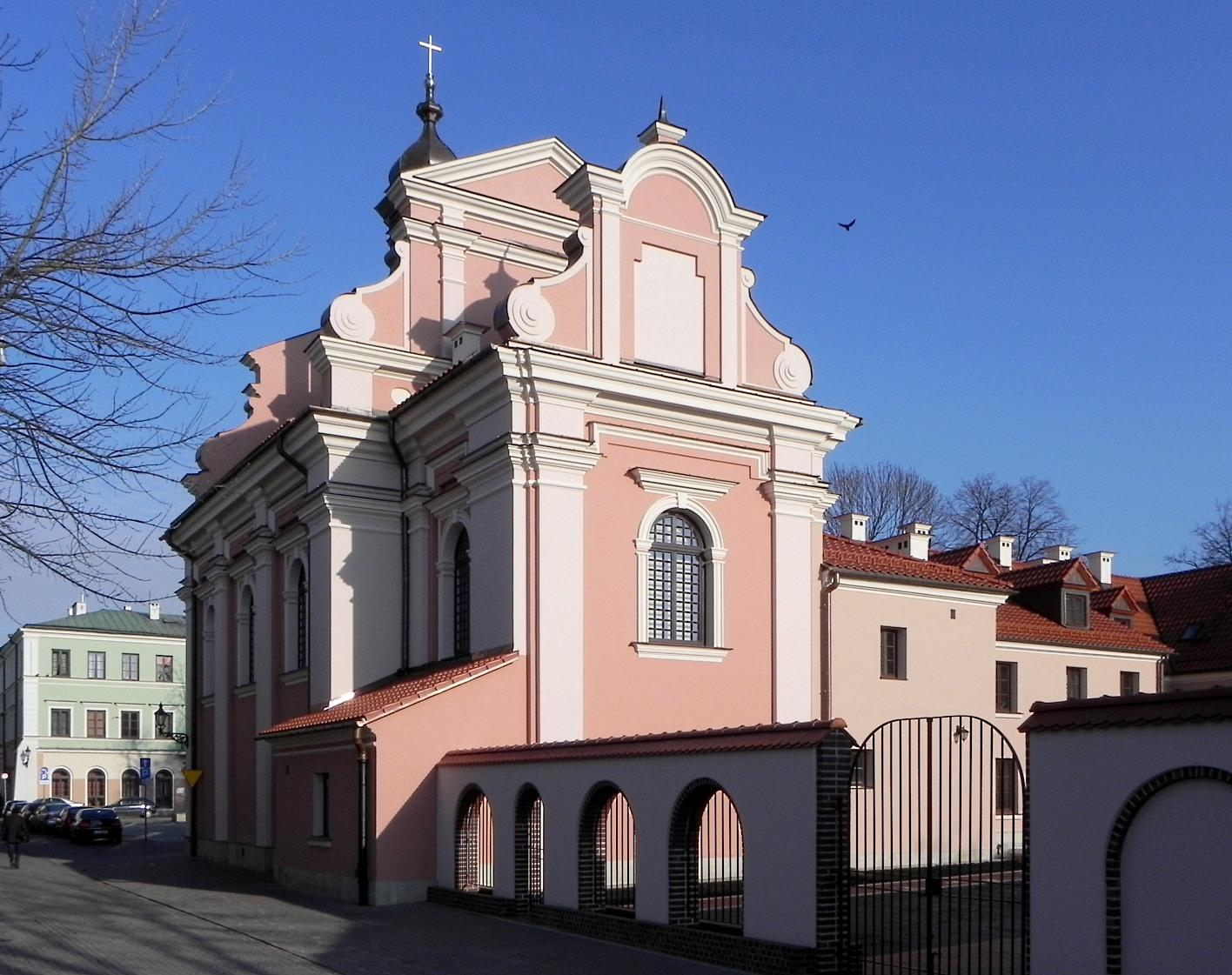
Saint Anne's Church

Called also the "Chemist's House", the Piechowicz House maintains a 350-year-old tradition. Namely the building, which was built by Szymon Piechowicz from Turobin, a chemist and a professor of medicine at the Zamoyski Academy, still houses a pharmacy. The shop is fitted with a set of 19th-century dark, oak cabinets.

Constructed by Bernardo Morando for an Italian merchant in the 1590s, also called the Telanowski house, the Zamoyski house belonged to Jan Zamoyski (1599–1657). The house has four arcades, a frieze placed under the windows and a parapet. It was supposed to be a model for other houses located on the square.

The construction of the Second Morando Tenement House started around 1590. It was designed by Bernardo Morando who placed Italian-style regular four-window façade with arcades. The windows are ornamented by a frieze with rosettes. Another frieze is situated on the side wall, showing a combination of rectangles and ovals.

The Abrek House was built for a professor of the Zamoyski Academy, Stanisław Rosiński. In 1636 the house was bought by another professor of the Zamoyski Academy, Andrzej Abrek who turned it into a splendid edifice with an arcaded portal, triangular top and three stone doors in the hallway.

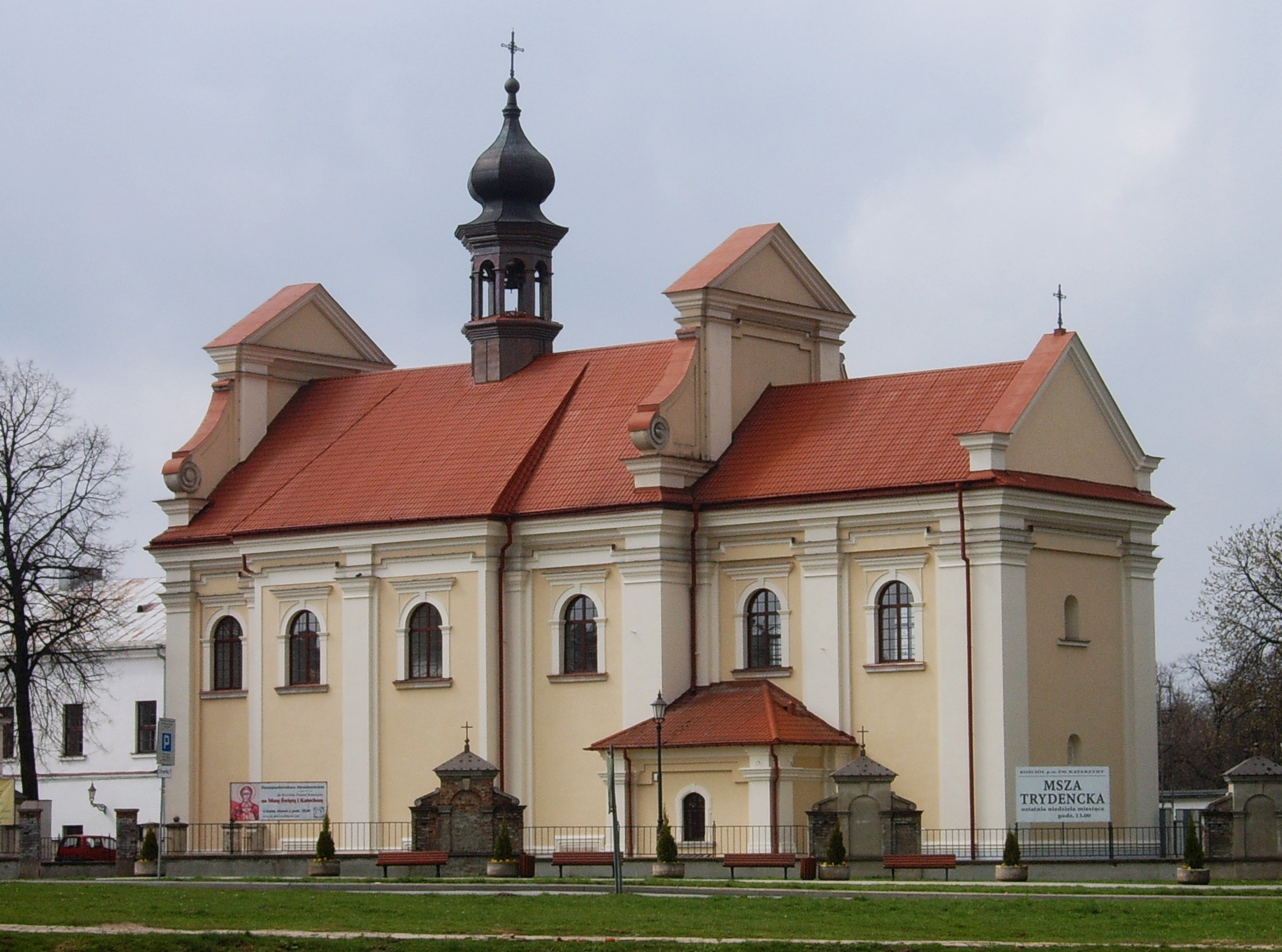
Saint Catherine Church

Built at the end of the 16th century, the Szczebrzeszyn House belonged to the town of Szczebrzeszyn. Its function was to keep Szczebrzeszyn's treasures and assets safely within the protection of Zamość fortress. The house has four windows, arcades and a richly ornamented finial in the form of a cartouche, which reputedly enclosed Szczebrzeszyn's coat of arms.

Built, the Turobin House was built in the 1600s in line with Bernardo Morando's design for the town of Turobin which used to be part of Zamość Entail. It is embellished with many Renaissance decorations based on Italian models taken from Sebastiano Serlio's books. Its façade has a frieze featuring a system of geometrical figures.

The cathedral (a former collegiate church until 1992) was founded by Jan Zamoyski and dedicated to the Lord's Resurrection and St. Thomas the Apostle. It was built in 1587–1598 by Bernardo Morando. It is 45 metres long and 30 metres wide; the Cathedral constitutes one of the most impressive sacral buildings in Poland. Full of numerous side chapels, thin pillars and a fine vaulted presbytery, it prides itself in original interior decor and rich Renaissance decorations, an 18th-century Rococo tabernacle and many paintings of Italian and Polish painters. In the church's vault, there are crypts with the ashes of 16 Zamość entailers and those of their families.

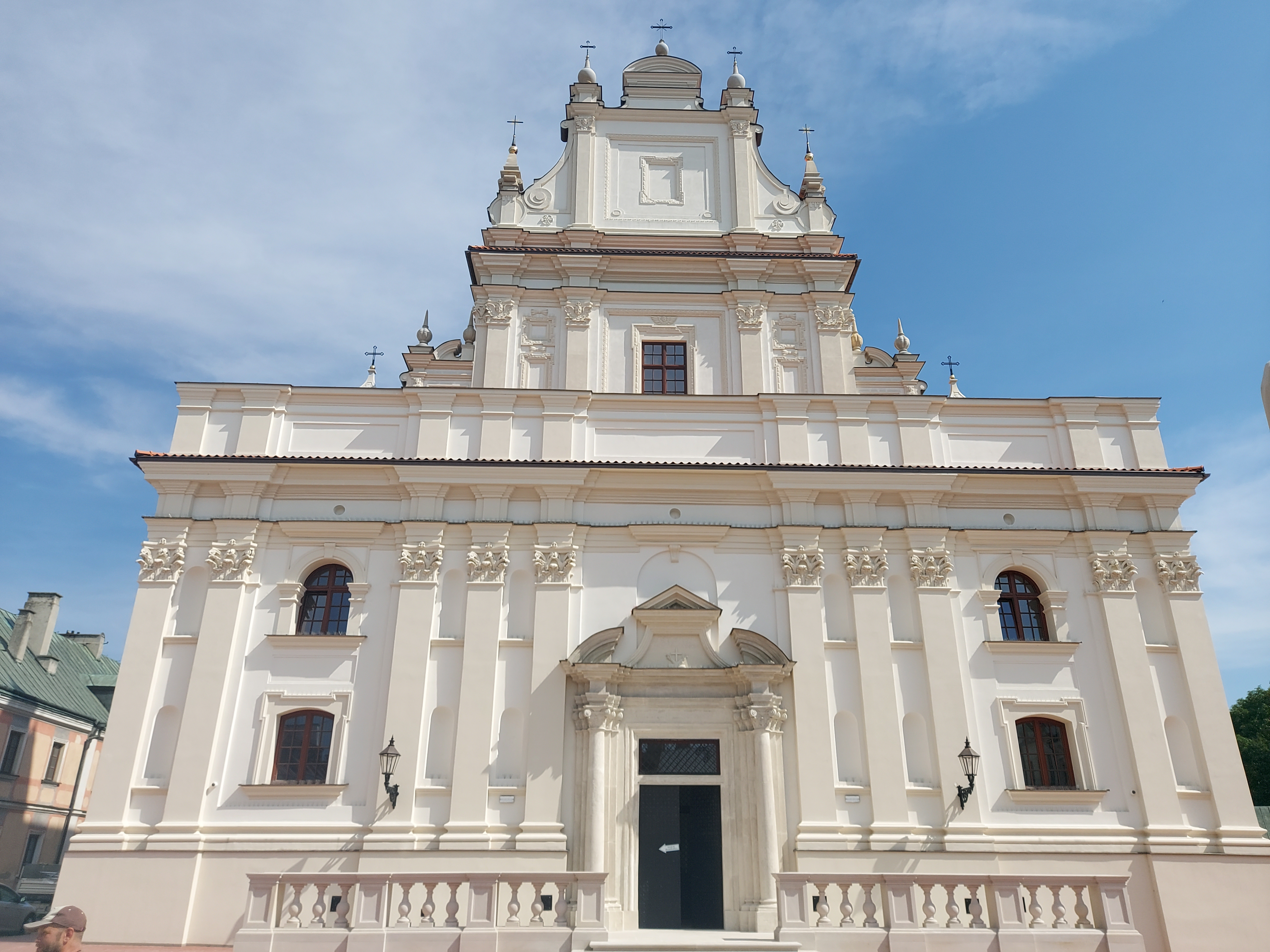
Franciscan Church

Built in the Baroque style in the second half of the 18th century, the Cathedral Bell Tower is a separate and prominent structure. It was erected to Jerzy de Kawe's design. The passageway is decorated with plaques commemorating the martyrdom of the inhabitants of Zamość Region during World War II. In the bell tower there are three historic bells: "Jan" – the biggest and the oldest one, named after its benefactor Jan "Sobiepan" Zamoyski, "Tomasz" founded by Tomasz Józef Zamoyski in 1721 and "Wawrzyniec" founded by Wawrzyniec Sikorski in 1715.

The Redemptorists' Church of St. Nicholas is the former Orthodox church built in 1618–1631. The project was drafted by Jan Jaroszewicz whereas the decorations were designed by Jan Wolff. The domed temple had a defensive purpose. In the 1690s a 38-metre-tall (125 ft) tower with a Baroque dome was added. The building has features typical of Moldavian Orthodox churches and Latin architecture.

Built in the 1680s in the Baroque style in line with J. M. Link's design, St. Catherine's Church was first dedicated to Saint Peter of Alcantara but in the 1920s it became an academic church dedicated to Saint Catherine of Alexandria. During World War II, the Prussian Homage (Polish: Hołd pruski; 1879−1882), the famous historical painting of Prussian Tribute, by Jan Matejko, was transferred secretly from Kraków and hidden in the vault of St. Catherine's to protect it from the German occupiers.

Tomasz Zamoyski, the second entailer, and his wife Katarzyna built the Franciscan Church Dedicated to The Annunciation in the Baroque style. The biggest temple in Zamość (56 metres long and 29 metres wide), it was regarded as one of the most prominent 17th-century churches in Poland. It was embellished with a very rich décor by Jan Michał Link. In 1784 the Austrians closed down the Franciscan Order and as a result the church lost its sacral function for many years, housing a cinema and secondary school. In 1993 the building was restored as a church again.

== Education ==
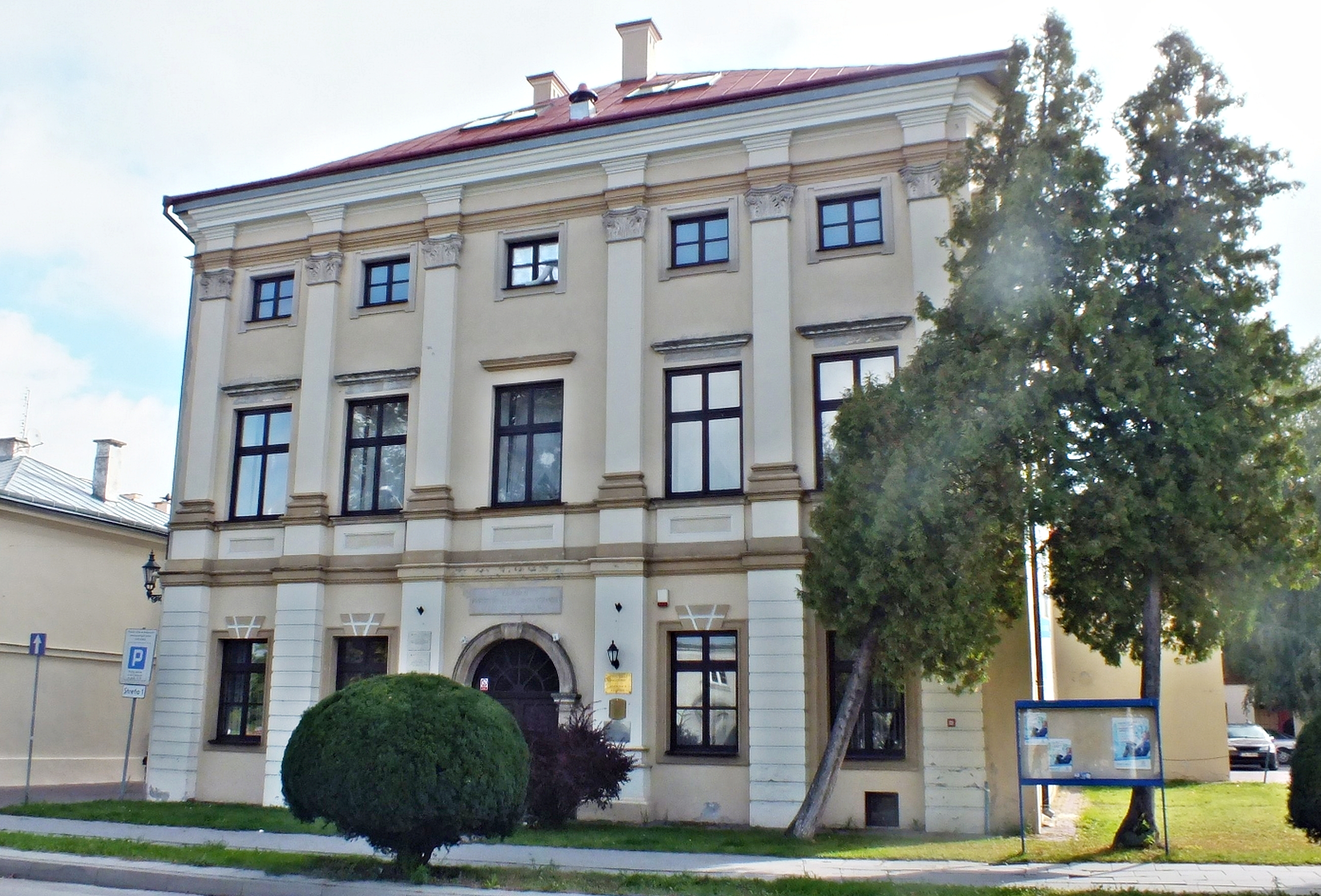
Higher School of Administration and Management

Zamość prides itself in the long history of educational services. The Zamoyski Academy (1594–1784) was an academy founded in 1594 by Polish Crown Chancellor Jan Zamoyski. It was the third institution of higher education to be founded in the Polish–Lithuanian Commonwealth.

The academy was an institution midway between a secondary school and an institution of higher learning that bestowed doctorates of philosophy and law. It was known for the high quality of education that it provided, which however did not extend beyond the ideals of "nobles"' liberty.

After Zamoyski's death, it slowly lost its importance, and in 1784 it was downgraded to a lyceum. The present-day I Liceum Ogólnokształcące im. Jana Zamoyskiego is one of several secondary schools in Zamość.

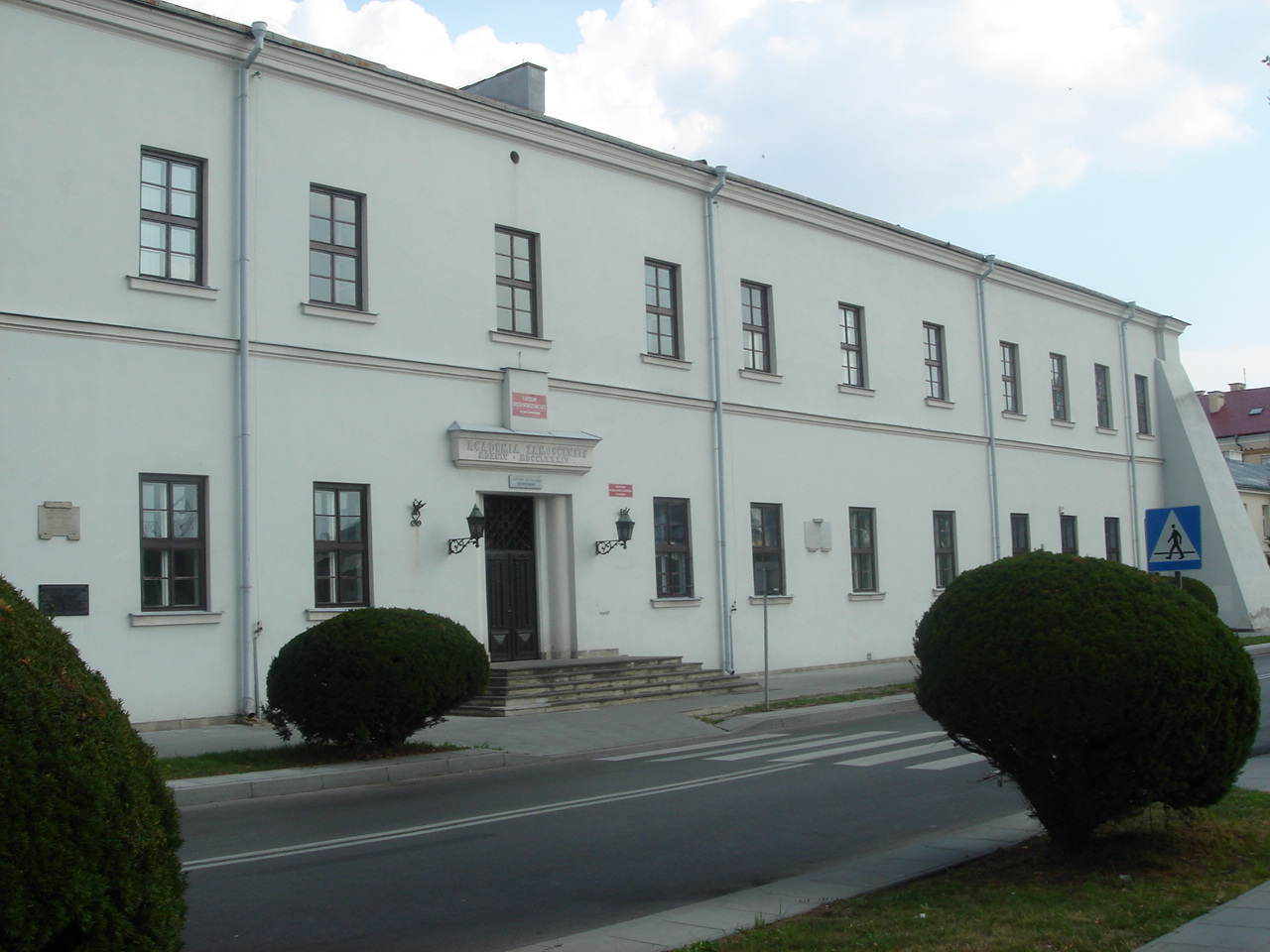
Former Academy

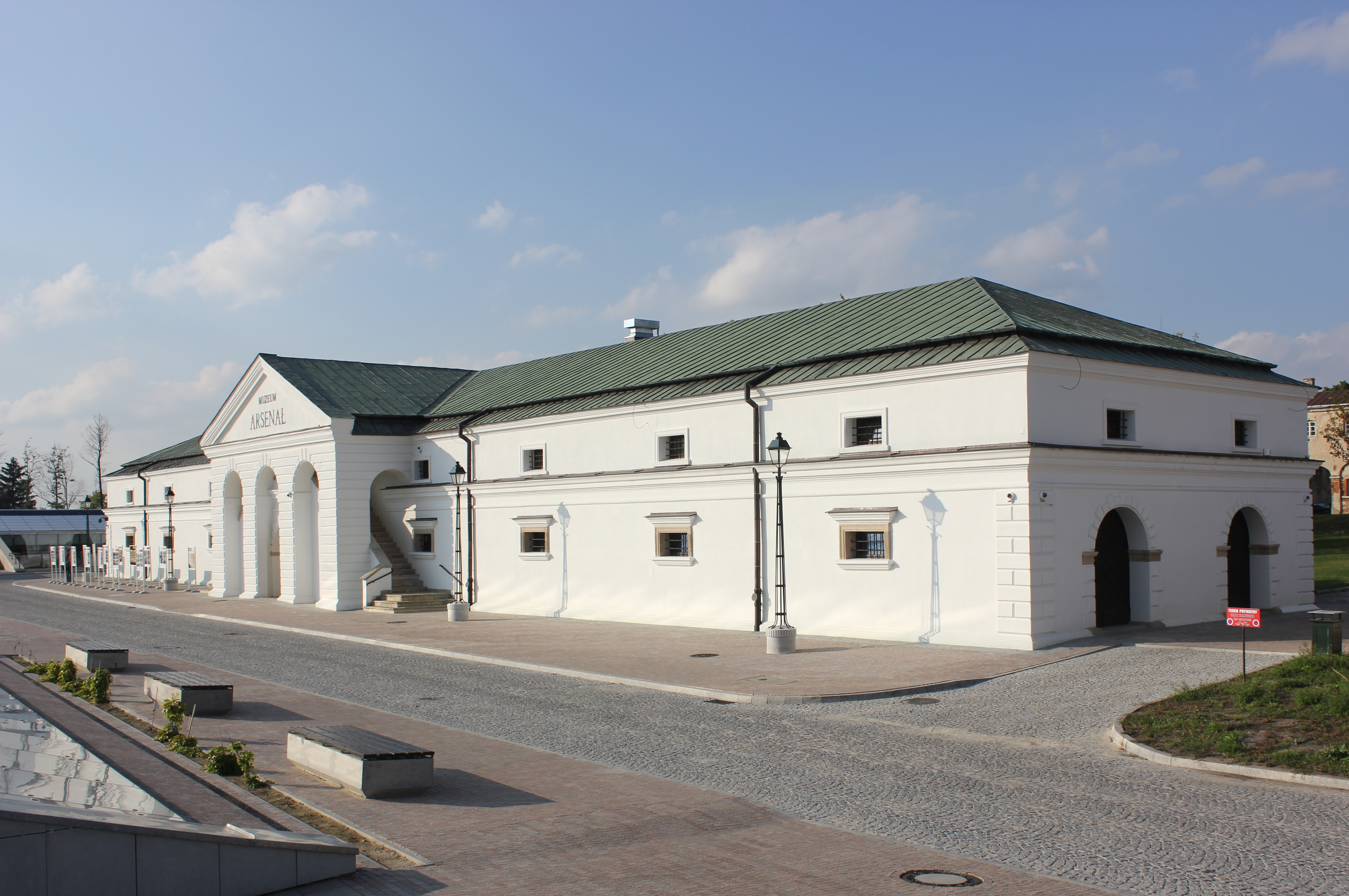
The Old Arsenal, now a museum

In modern Zamość there are 9 secondary schools: 7 public (numbered from 1 to 7), one Catholic and one Social school. In addition, there are 10 primary schools: 8 public (numbered from 2 – 4 and from 6–10) as well as a Catholic and a Social primary school.

High schools

- I Liceum Ogólnokształcące im. Jana Zamoyskiego
- II Liceum Ogólnokształcąse im. M. Konopnickiej
- III Liceum Ogólnokształcące im. K. C. Norwida
- IV Liceum Ogólnokształcące im Armi Krajowej

Technikum

- Zespół szkół ponadgimnazjalnych 1 Ekonomik
- Zespół szkół ponadgimnazjalnych 2 Mechanik
- Zespół szkół ponadgimnazjalnych 3 Elektryk
- Zespół szkół ponadgimnazjalnych 4 Budowlanka
- Zespół szkół ponadgimnazjalnych 5 Rolniczak

Colleges

- Akademia Zamojska w Zamościu
- Wyższa Szkoła Humanistyczno-Ekonomiczna im. Jana Zamoyskiego
- Wyższa Szkoła Zarządzania i Administracji
- Zespół Kolegiów Nauczycielskich w Zamościu

== Economy ==
The city is located on the broad gauge railway line linking the former Soviet Union with Upper Silesian coal and sulphur mines as well as less than 60 kilometers (37 miles) from the border crossings to Ukraine. Zamość is also located on a standard gauge rail line, although it is not electrified. The economy of the city is based on services which is why it is dominated by numerous small and medium-sized enterprises. However, there are some large production plants, mainly food factories and companies, that reflect the regional dominance of agriculture. These include the Zamojskie Wheat Company (Zamojskie Zakłady Zbożowe), the Animex fodder company, the Mors frozen food producer, and a daughter company of the Dairy in Krasnystaw.

The city is also a centre of expertise for agriculture and a market for various agricultural products. In addition, the other companies include a daughter company of the Black Red White furniture company (former Zamojskie Furniture Company), the Spomasz Zamość SA industrial and metal hardware producer, the SIPMOT agricultural machinery producer (a branch of the SIPMA Group from Lublin and a branch of Stalprodukt (former Metalplast) – producer of metal hardware and equipment from Bochnia, listed on the Warsaw Stock Exchange.

== Culture ==
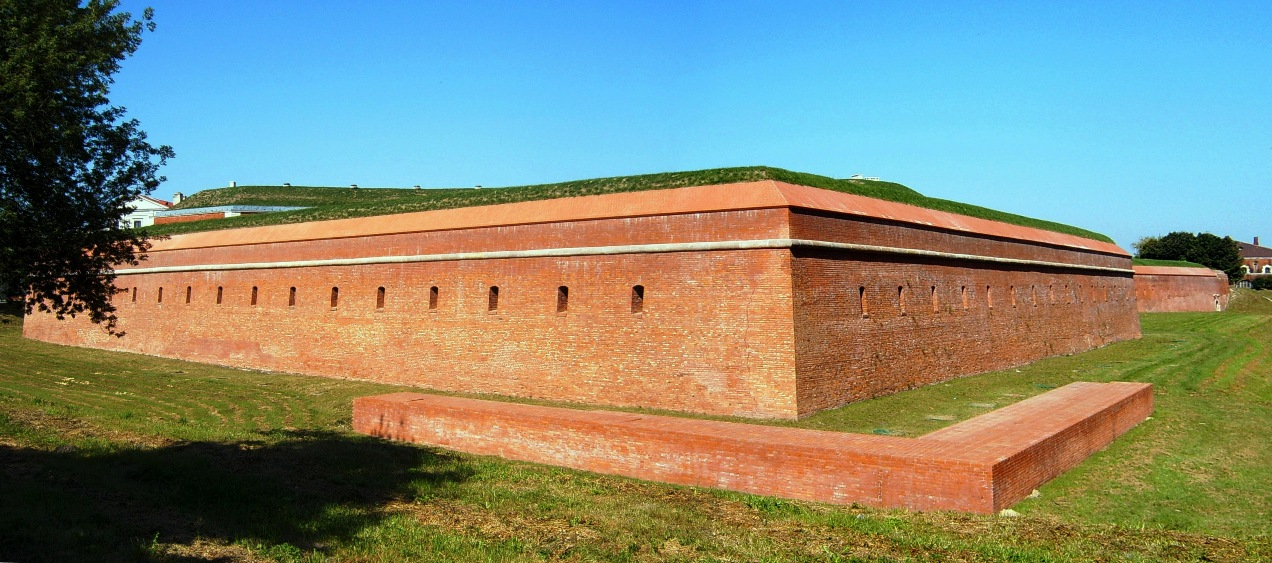
7th Bastion of the Fortress – The only fully preserved bastion

The Old Town and the remnants of the old Zamość Fortress constitute an urban complex inscribed on the UNESCO World Heritage Site. Zamość hosts the following cultural events: concerts of music performed by the Karol Namysłowski Symphonic Orchestra in Zamość and by Polish artists representing different kinds of music, Zamość Days of Music (Zamojskie Dni Muzyki) and International Meetings of Jazz Singers (Międzynarodowe Spotkania Wokalistów Jazzowych), which is a tribute to Mieczysław Kosz, a great blind jazz player and composer who used to combine his jazz music with the Polish folk.

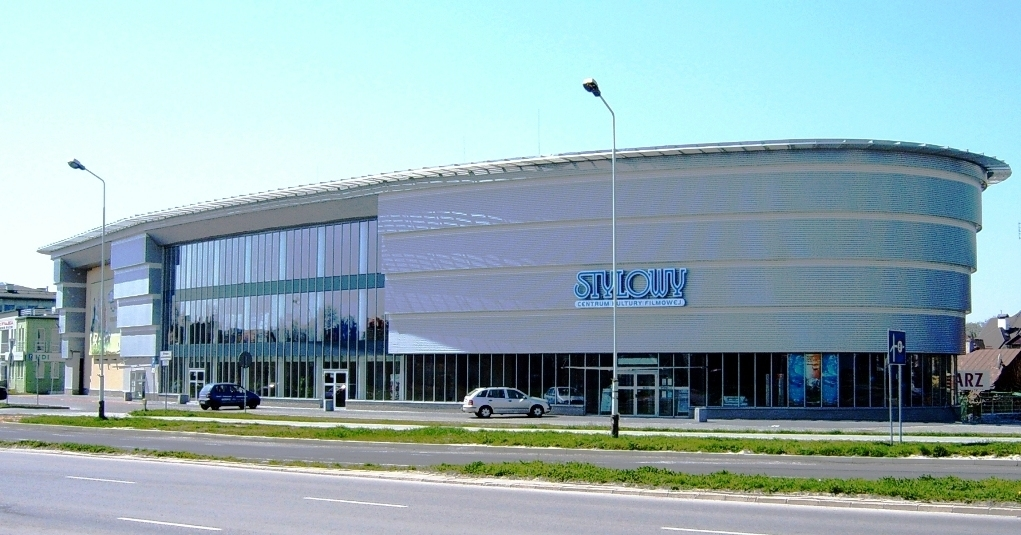
The Centre of Film Culture "Stylowy" in Zamość ("Stylowy" cinema)

Jazz na Kresach is a very popular annual music festival that dates back to 1982 and has been held since. The festival is organised in Zamość Old Town by the Zamość Jazz Club to commemorate Mieczysław Kosz.

In addition, there are the open-air performances of the Zamość Summer Theatre (Zamojskie Lato Teatralne) and the annual "EUROFOLK" International Folk Festival. There are the Summer Film Academy and the "SACROFILM" International Religious Film Days.

== Geography ==
=== Climate ===
The climate is warm-summer humid continental (Köppen: Dfb), typical of eastern Poland.

Climate data for Zamość, Poland (1991–2020 normals, extremes 1951–2000 and 2015–present)
Month	Jan	Feb	Mar	Apr	May	Jun	Jul	Aug	Sep	Oct	Nov	Dec	Year
Record high °C (°F)	14.5 (58.1)	17.6 (63.7)	23.3 (73.9)	28.3 (82.9)	31.8 (89.2)	35.4 (95.7)	35.7 (96.3)	35.7 (96.3)	31.2 (88.2)	25.6 (78.1)	20.4 (68.7)	17.2 (63.0)	35.7 (96.3)
Mean maximum °C (°F)	7.7 (45.9)	10.9 (51.6)	16.1 (61.0)	23.7 (74.7)	27.0 (80.6)	30.6 (87.1)	31.2 (88.2)	31.9 (89.4)	27.2 (81.0)	22.4 (72.3)	15.4 (59.7)	8.9 (48.0)	32.8 (91.0)
Mean daily maximum °C (°F)	0.5 (32.9)	2.7 (36.9)	7.0 (44.6)	14.2 (57.6)	19.3 (66.7)	23.3 (73.9)	24.5 (76.1)	24.6 (76.3)	19.0 (66.2)	12.6 (54.7)	5.8 (42.4)	1.7 (35.1)	12.9 (55.3)
Daily mean °C (°F)	−2.2 (28.0)	−0.5 (31.1)	2.6 (36.7)	8.6 (47.5)	13.4 (56.1)	17.4 (63.3)	18.5 (65.3)	18.3 (64.9)	13.6 (56.5)	8.2 (46.8)	2.7 (36.9)	−0.7 (30.7)	8.3 (47.0)
Mean daily minimum °C (°F)	−5.2 (22.6)	−3.5 (25.7)	−1.4 (29.5)	3.1 (37.6)	7.5 (45.5)	11.4 (52.5)	12.7 (54.9)	12.3 (54.1)	8.9 (48.0)	4.4 (39.9)	−0.1 (31.8)	−3.2 (26.2)	3.9 (39.0)
Mean minimum °C (°F)	−16.8 (1.8)	−14.6 (5.7)	−9.6 (14.7)	−3.8 (25.2)	0.2 (32.4)	4.9 (40.8)	7.4 (45.3)	6.3 (43.3)	1.2 (34.2)	−3.1 (26.4)	−8.9 (16.0)	−14.7 (5.5)	−20.0 (−4.0)
Record low °C (°F)	−31.6 (−24.9)	−34.4 (−29.9)	−27.9 (−18.2)	−7.8 (18.0)	−3.9 (25.0)	−1.0 (30.2)	4.5 (40.1)	0.5 (32.9)	−6.0 (21.2)	−9.6 (14.7)	−25.4 (−13.7)	−27.0 (−16.6)	−34.4 (−29.9)
Average precipitation mm (inches)	20.9 (0.82)	28.8 (1.13)	32.4 (1.28)	47.0 (1.85)	73.1 (2.88)	63.7 (2.51)	87.9 (3.46)	49.1 (1.93)	74.3 (2.93)	53.7 (2.11)	32.0 (1.26)	30.7 (1.21)	593.6 (23.37)
Average precipitation days (≥ 0.1 mm)	13.93	14.73	15.13	12.31	14.94	11.31	14.00	11.67	12.60	14.40	15.07	15.60	165.69
Average relative humidity (%)	85.5	82.7	78.1	72.2	74.9	75.4	75.6	76.0	80.7	83.6	86.3	87.1	79.8
Average dew point °C (°F)	−4 (25)	−3 (27)	−1 (30)	3 (37)	7 (45)	11 (52)	13 (55)	13 (55)	10 (50)	6 (43)	3 (37)	−1 (30)	5 (41)
Mean monthly sunshine hours	60.9	68.8	111.4	154.9	221.6	232.1	228.5	216.0	138.8	101.3	59.1	39.5	1,632.9
Average ultraviolet index	1	1	2	4	4	5	6	5	3	2	2	1	3
Source 1: Meteomodel.pl
Source 2: Weather Atlas (UV), Time and Date (dewpoints, 2005–2015)

Climate data for Zamość (IMGW Meteorological observatory), elevation: 212 m or 696 ft, 1961-1990 normals and extremes
Month	Jan	Feb	Mar	Apr	May	Jun	Jul	Aug	Sep	Oct	Nov	Dec	Year
Record high °C (°F)	12.6 (54.7)	18.5 (65.3)	23.3 (73.9)	28.3 (82.9)	30.6 (87.1)	35.4 (95.7)	34.0 (93.2)	33.8 (92.8)	29.6 (85.3)	25.6 (78.1)	20.4 (68.7)	17.2 (63.0)	35.4 (95.7)
Mean daily maximum °C (°F)	−1.3 (29.7)	0.5 (32.9)	5.6 (42.1)	13.1 (55.6)	18.7 (65.7)	21.6 (70.9)	23.0 (73.4)	22.6 (72.7)	18.4 (65.1)	12.9 (55.2)	5.9 (42.6)	1.0 (33.8)	11.8 (53.3)
Daily mean °C (°F)	−4.4 (24.1)	−2.9 (26.8)	1.3 (34.3)	7.5 (45.5)	13.0 (55.4)	16.2 (61.2)	17.4 (63.3)	16.6 (61.9)	12.7 (54.9)	7.8 (46.0)	2.8 (37.0)	−1.6 (29.1)	7.2 (45.0)
Mean daily minimum °C (°F)	−8.0 (17.6)	−6.4 (20.5)	−2.7 (27.1)	2.5 (36.5)	7.2 (45.0)	10.3 (50.5)	11.8 (53.2)	11.0 (51.8)	7.8 (46.0)	3.7 (38.7)	−0.1 (31.8)	−4.5 (23.9)	2.7 (36.9)
Record low °C (°F)	−31.6 (−24.9)	−29.9 (−21.8)	−25.3 (−13.5)	−7.8 (18.0)	−3.9 (25.0)	−1.0 (30.2)	4.5 (40.1)	0.5 (32.9)	−6.0 (21.2)	−9.6 (14.7)	−25.4 (−13.7)	−27.0 (−16.6)	−31.6 (−24.9)
Average precipitation mm (inches)	25 (1.0)	23 (0.9)	28 (1.1)	40 (1.6)	62 (2.4)	83 (3.3)	79 (3.1)	68 (2.7)	48 (1.9)	38 (1.5)	36 (1.4)	33 (1.3)	563 (22.2)
Average precipitation days (≥ 1.0 mm)	7.0	6.3	7.1	7.3	9.8	9.7	9.9	8.0	7.6	6.6	7.9	8.5	95.7
Source: NOAA

See or edit raw graph data.

== Sports ==
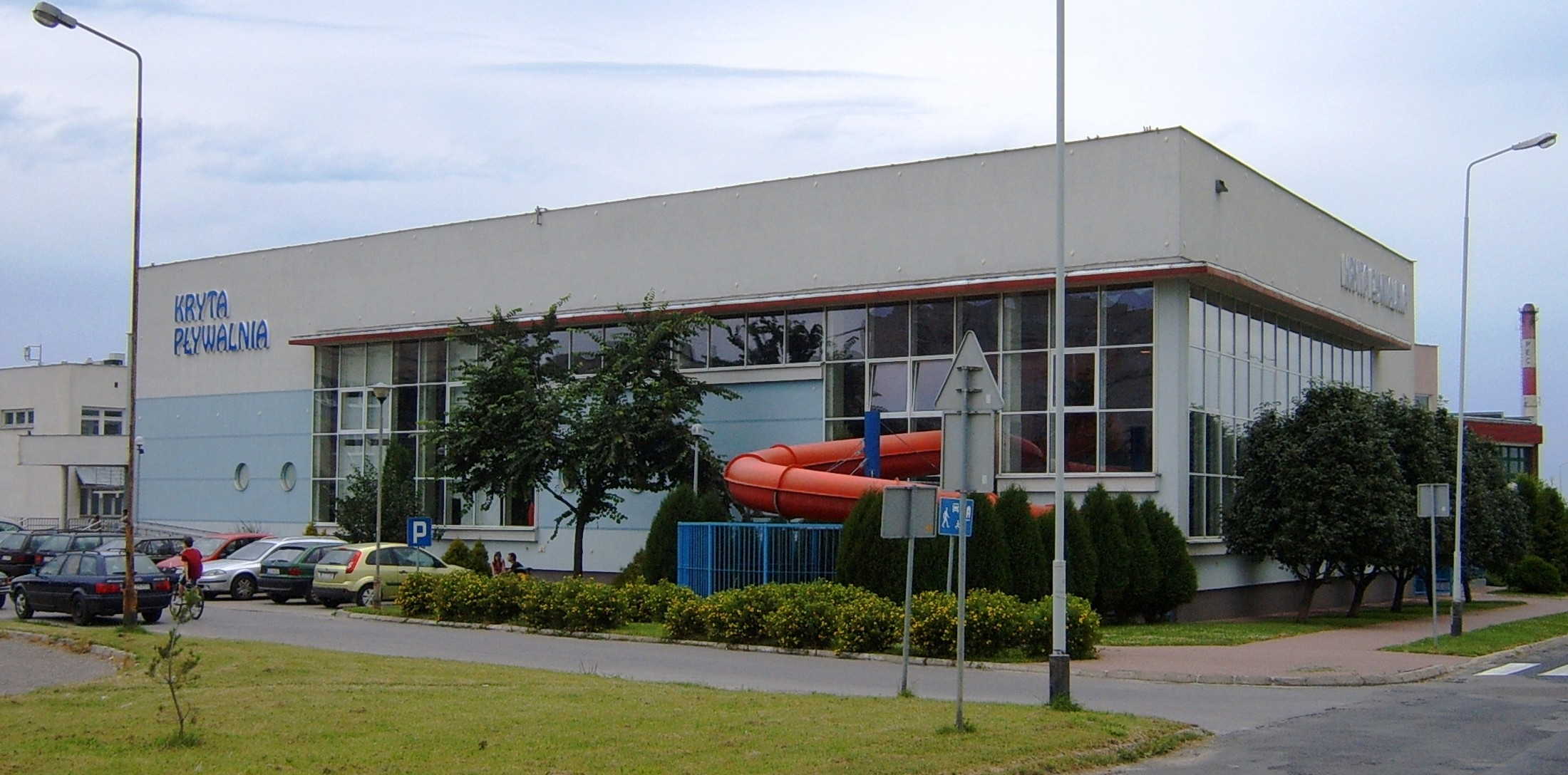
Swimming pool

Zamość is home to several sport clubs, the most prominent being handball team Padwa Zamość, football team Hetman Zamość, and multi-sports club Agros Zamość with athletics, archery, cycling, weightlifting, wrestling and sumo sections.

== Notable people ==
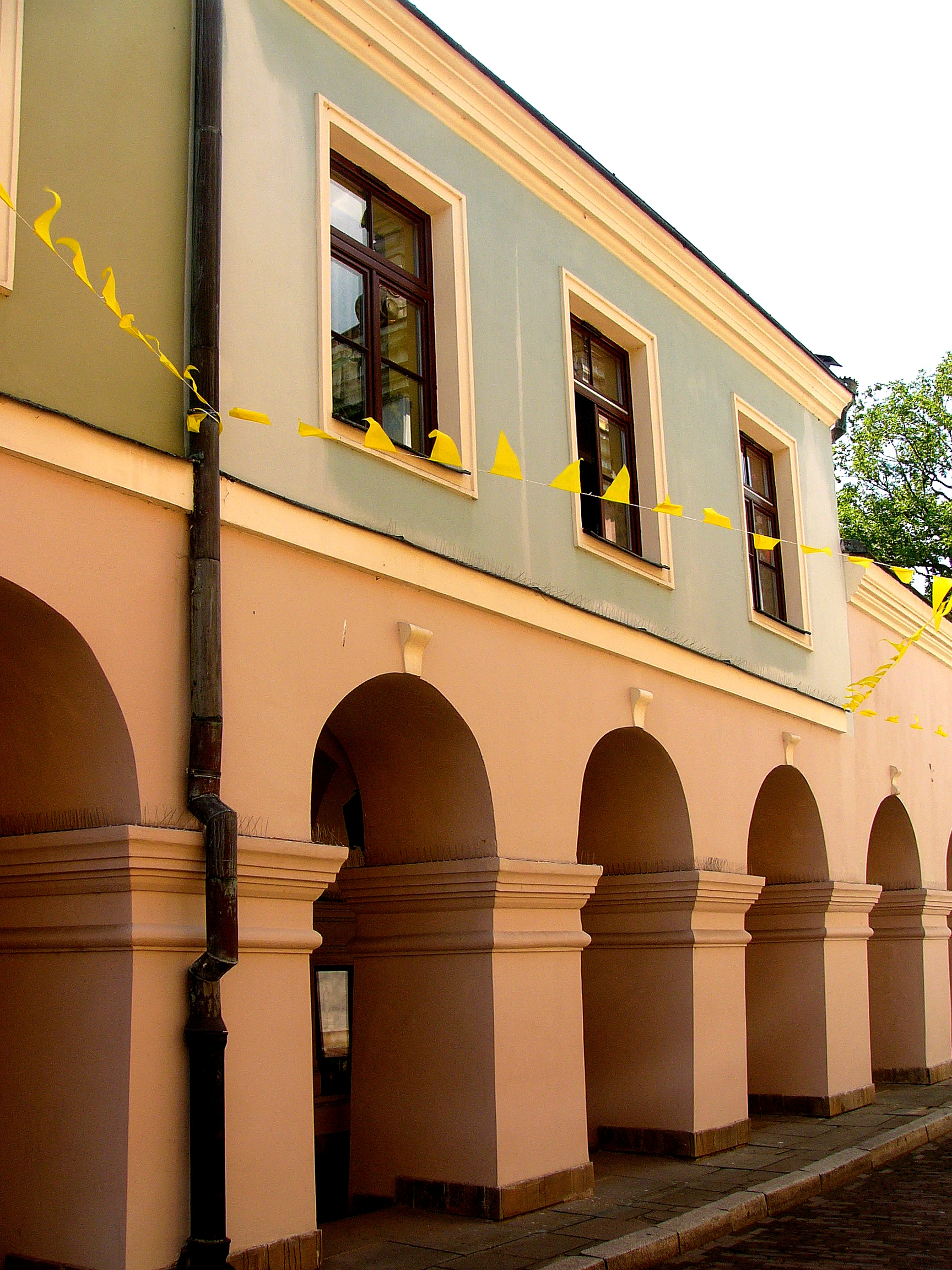
Birthplace of Rosa Luxemburg

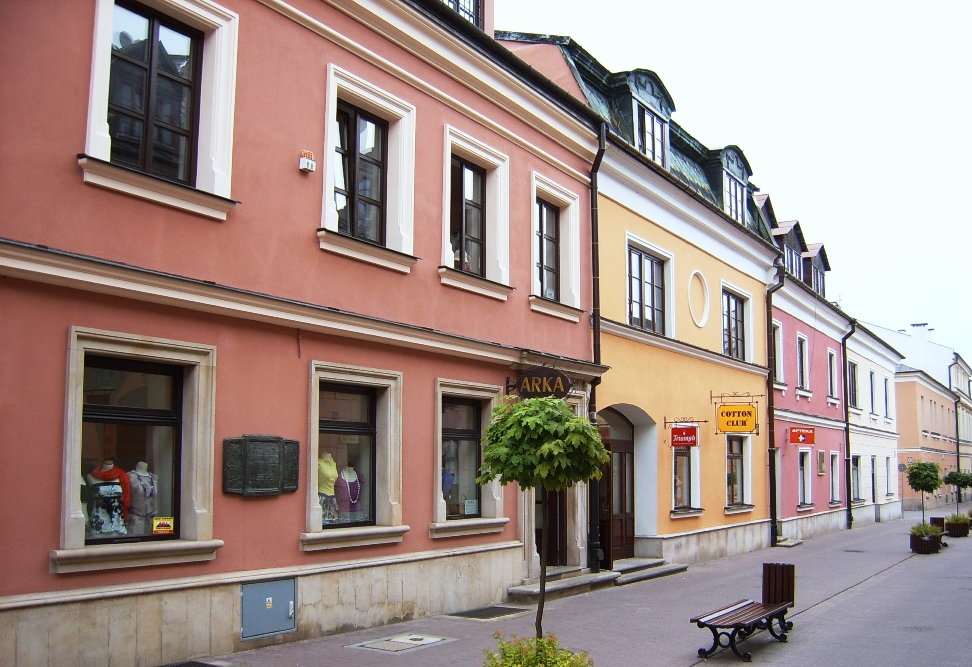
Birthplace and childhood home of musician Marek Grechuta

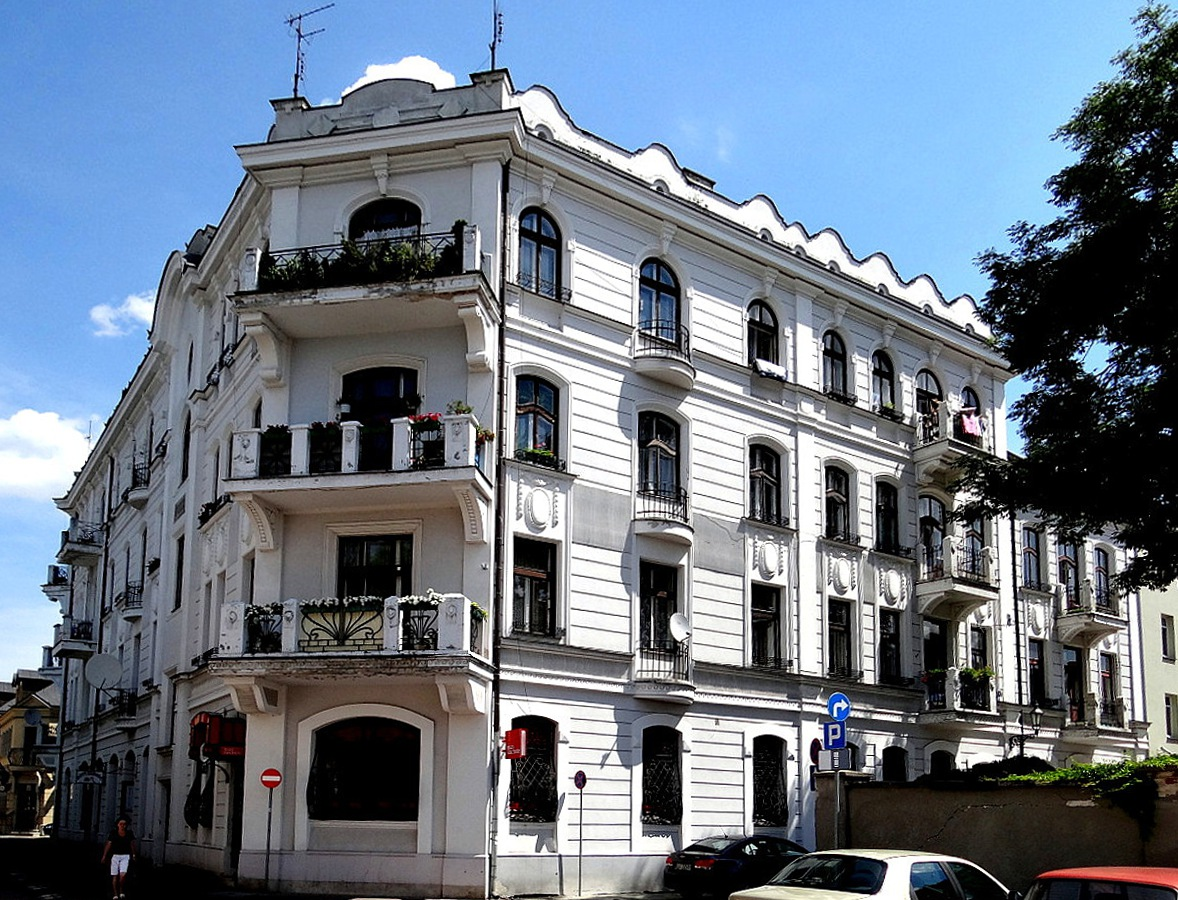
Former home of poet Bolesław Leśmian

- Tauba Biterman (1918–2019), Holocaust survivor who dedicated her adult life to teaching and sharing memories of the Holocaust
- Joseph Epstein (1911–1944), Polish-born Jewish communist activist and a French Resistance leader during World War II
- Solomon Ettinger (1802–1856), Yiddish- and Hebrew-language playwright, poet and writer of songs and fables
- Marek Grechuta (1945–2006), Polish singer, songwriter, composer, and lyricist
- Anna Jakubczak (born 1973), Polish middle-distance runner
- Irene Lieblich (1923–2008), Polish-born artist and Holocaust survivor noted for illustrating the books of Nobel laureate Isaac Bashevis Singer and for her paintings highlighting Jewish life and culture
- Rosa Luxemburg (1871–1919), Marxist theorist, philosopher, economist and activist of Polish Jewish descent who became a naturalized German citizen
- Adam Niklewicz (born 1957), American sculptor and illustrator
- Zbigniew Nowosadzki (born 1957), Polish painter
- Isaac Leib Peretz (1852–1915), Yiddish language author and playwright
- Mateusz Prus (born 1990), professional footballer
- Leopold Skulski (1878–1940), Prime Minister of Poland from 1919 to 1920
- Mordechai Strigler (1921–1998), Yiddish writer
- Przemysław Tytoń (born 1987), Polish goalkeeper
- Gryzelda Konstancja Zamoyska (1623–1672), wife of Jeremi Wiśniowiecki and the mother of Polish King Michał Korybut Wiśniowiecki (Michael I)
- Jan "Sobiepan" Zamoyski (1627–1665), 3rd Ordynat of the Ordynacja Zamojska estates
- Aleksander Zederbaum (1816–1893), Polish-Russian Jewish journalist, founder and editor of Ha-Meliẓ, and other periodicals published in Russian and Yiddish
- Szymon Szymonowic (1558–1629), Polish humanist, poet associated with Grand Hetman and Royal Chancellor Jan Zamoyski, with whom in 1593–1605 he organized the Zamoyski Academy
- Bernardo Morando (c. 1540–1600), Italian architect, author of a new town of Zamość, mayor of Zamość
- Stanisław Staszic (1755–1826), Polish priest, philosopher, statesman, geologist, scholar, poet and writer, a leader of the Polish Enlightenment. He was a tutor for the children of Andrzej Zamoyski, the 10th Ordynat of the Ordynacja Zamojska estates
- Bolesław Leśmian (1877–1937), Polish poet, artist and member of the Polish Academy of Literature, one of the most influential poets of the early 20th century in Poland. He lived and worked as a lawyer (notary) in Zamość
- Jacob ben Wolf Kranz (1741–1804), rabbi known for his instructive lessons based on Jewish tradition
- Walerian Łukasiński (1786–1868), Polish officer and political activist, sentenced by Russian Imperial authorities to 14 years' imprisonment, he was never released and died after 46 years. He spent 7 years in the tsarist prison in Zamość.
- Simeon of Poland, Polish-Armenian priest and traveler

== Literature ==
Fritz Stuber, "Notes on the Revalorization of Historic Towns in Poland", in Ekistics (Athens), Vol. 49, No. 295, 1982, pp. 336–341, 3 ill.

== Municipal Transport Authority ==
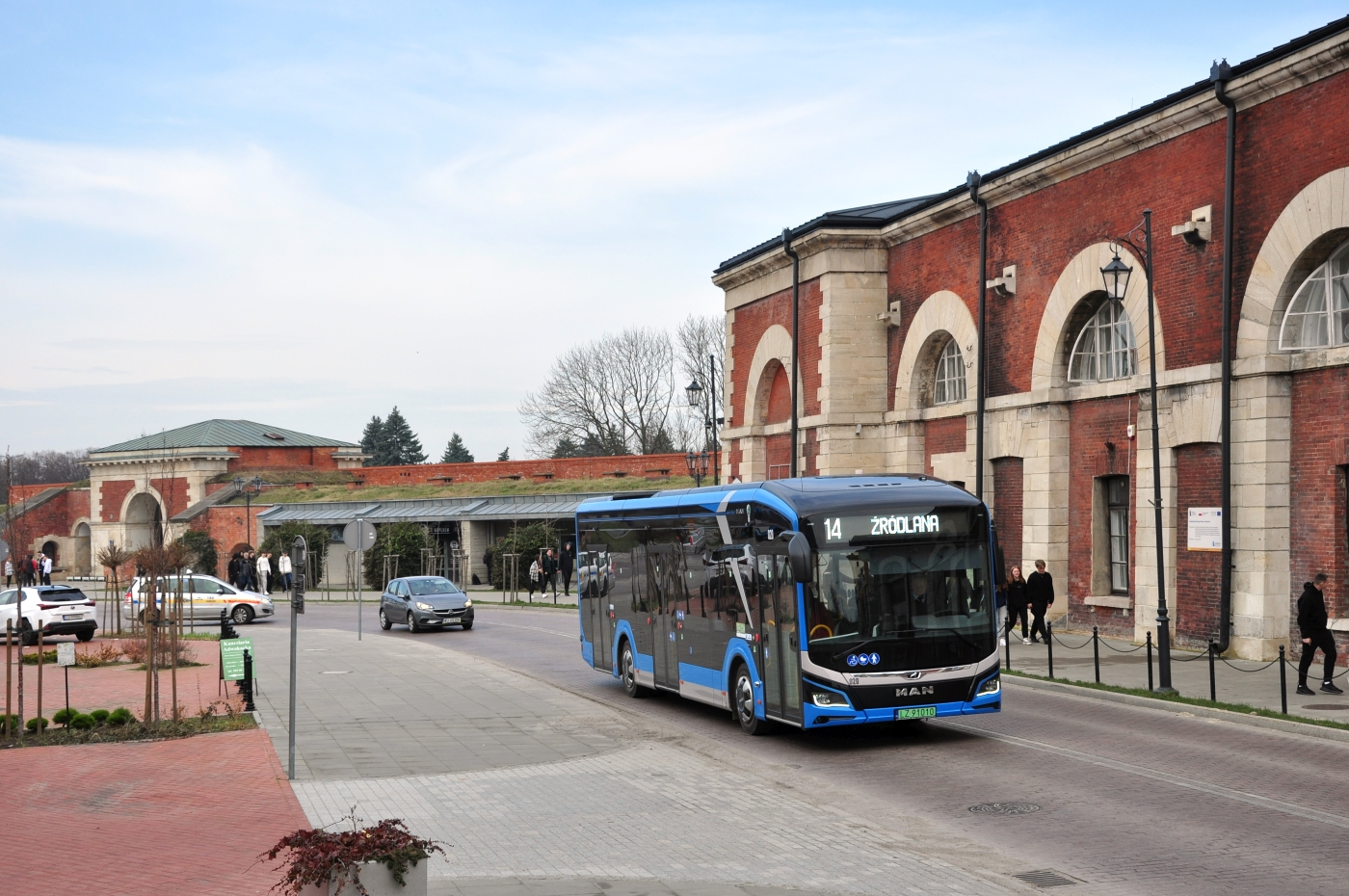
MAN New Lion City 12E on Line 14, 2024.

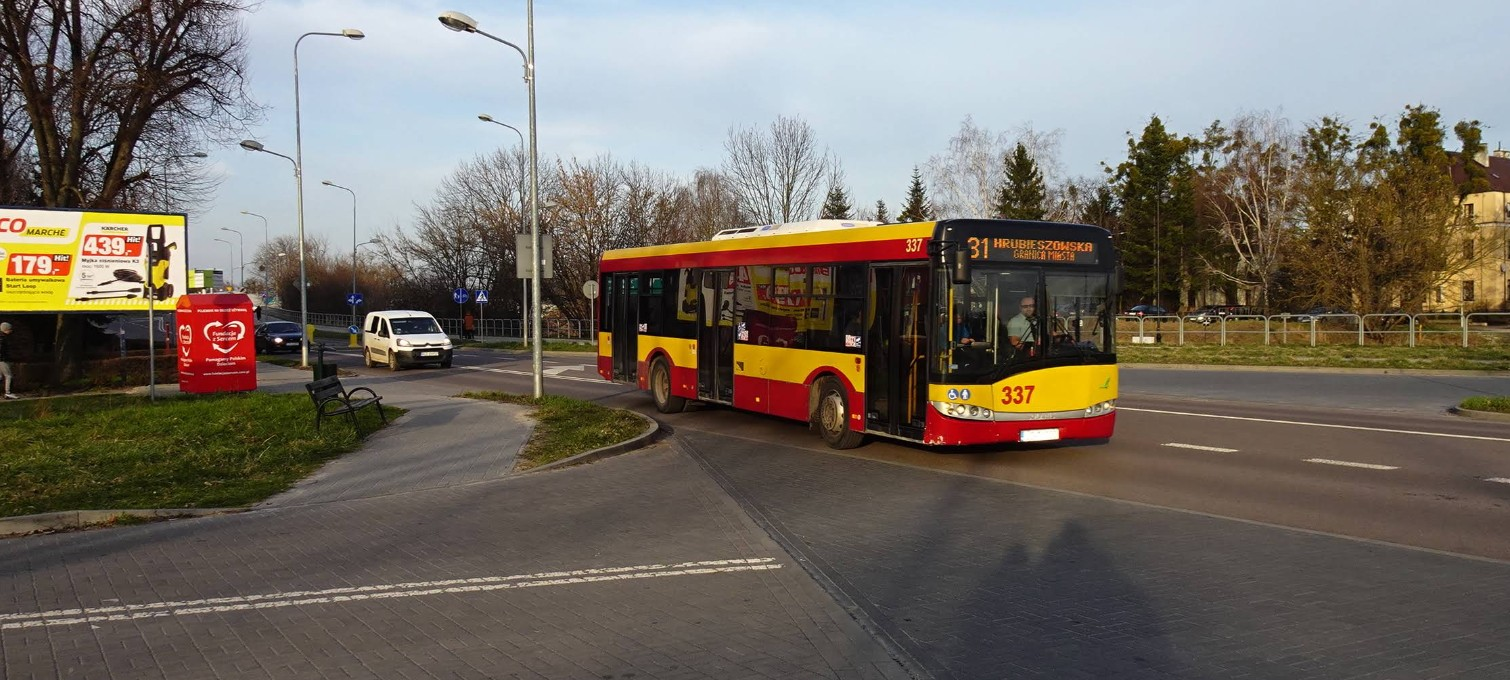
Solaris Urbino 12 III on Line 31, 2024 (Ex-Mobilis Warsaw, now sold and replaced in 2026.)

The town's buses are operated by MZK Zamosc, who run 28 bus routes, including one free line as well as a soon-to-come Line 60, totalling 29 by the end of 2026. They are numbered 1-60, and operate with the recent addition of the town's newly acquisitioned MAN e-bus New Lion City's. For the first time, this purchase included 4 bendy buses, something not seen before in the town.

The routes connect residents of the town as well as surrounding areas, mostly villages, including Sitaniec, Lapiguz, Borowina Sitaniecka, Czolki, Horyszow, Szopinek, Majdan, Kalinowice, Jatutow, Labunie, Pniowek, Zdanowek, Hubale, Ploskie, Siedliska, Osiedle Karolowka and Bortatycze.

The town's buses run from as early at 6 in the morning to as late as 10 at night on routes with high demand, such as Line 3.

The authority's depot is situated in the north-west of the town, on road ul. Lipowa - not far from the road ul. Graniczna - Border Road. Tyre and car wash services are also available at the garage.

== Twin towns – sister cities ==
Zamość is twinned with OWHC cities as well as:

- Schwäbisch Hall, Germany (since 1989)
- Zhovkva, Ukraine (since 1991)
- Loughborough, United Kingdom (since 1998)
- Bardejov, Slovakia (since 2003)
- Lutsk, Ukraine (since 2005)
- Sighișoara, Romania (since 2007)
- Weimar, Germany (since 2012)
- Fountain Hills, Arizona, United States of America (since 2014)

Friendship agreements

- Cassino, Italy
- Sumy, Ukraine

== See also ==
- Seven Wonders of Poland
- List of World Heritage Sites in Poland
- Apteka Rektorska, Renaissance Rector's Pharmacy located at the Main Square 2 in the Old Town, the oldest pharmacy in Poland operating continuously since 1609
- Zamość railway station
