= Solomon Ettinger =

Polish Yiddish and Hebrew-language playwright

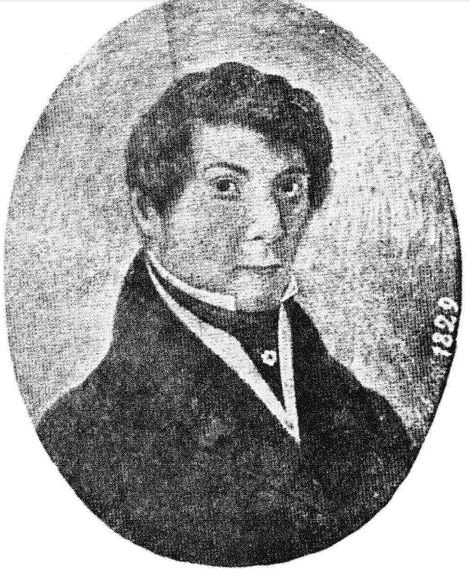

Solomon Ettinger (Yiddish: שלמה עטינגער, 1802–1856) was a 19th-century Yiddish- and Hebrew-language playwright, poet and writer of songs and fables whose emblematic play Serkele has remained a classic of the Yiddish theatre. His given name has appeared variously as Salomon or Shlomo or Shloyme and his family name has also been rendered as Ettingher.

Ettinger was born in Warsaw; after being orphaned at an early age, he was raised in Łęczna by a paternal uncle, Mendel Ettinger, a rabbi who was proficient in German, and open to allowing his nephew to explore aspects of the Enlightenment as part of his education.

At the age of 15, Solomon Ettinger entered into an arranged marriage with Golda, the daughter of magnate Judah Leib Wolf, of Zamość. The young couple moved to Zamość, and lived with Golda's parents. There Ettinger came under the influence of the Haskalah, the Jewish Enlightenment movement.

By 1795, Poland had been partitioned between Prussia, Russia and Austria. Zamość was in the Austrian partition, but the residents spoke primarily Polish and Zamość had a large Jewish population.

Eventually, he traveled to the big town of the Austrian partition, the primarily Polish-Ukrainian city of Lviv (then often known as Lemberg), to study medicine at its renowned University. After years of learning, he graduated with a medical degree and returned to his native region, but was unable to practice as a physician. By 1832 the city of Zamość, where Ettinger now lived, had been incorporated into the Russian partition, the most intolerant of the three. Anti-Jewish pogroms were frequent and Ettinger's degree was declared invalid, because it came from an ostensibly foreign institution.

After numerous attempts at other professions, including an unsuccessful period with an agricultural group, Ettinger settled in Odessa, a Russian Black Sea port with a substantial number of Jewish residents, and attempted to make a living as a writer, while supplementing his income with various short-lived jobs. Much of what he has written is now lost, but his sketches, poetry and songs were published in various Yiddish-language periodicals of the time. His only surviving dramas are fragments of two plays Der Feter fun America (The Uncle from America) and Freleche Yungeleut (Carefree Youth) found after his death, and the play that keeps his name alive and is still performed by Yiddish theaters around the world, Serkele, which, while written when Ettinger was in his twenties, and performed during his lifetime, was first published posthumously in 1861.

Serkele is one of the most renowned plays in the entire repertoire of the Yiddish theater and owes its high reputation to its strong sense of form, sound and rhythm. The characters are delineated in a masterful style comparable to that of the most esteemed dramatists and its outlook remains alive and fresh after 180 years. The Yiddish linguistic stylization in Serkele and the two fragmentary plays is crisp and self-assured, displaying a mastery of the medium. Renowned Yiddish playwrights who flourished immediately after Ettinger, such as Abraham Goldfaden and Jacob Gordin have written how much they were influenced by Serkele.

No clear details have emerged as to the circumstances of his death. Such writings of his that did survive were preserved by his family and published posthumously, in most cases, decades after their author's death.
