= Franciscan Church, Zamość =

Coordinates: 50.7160°N 23.2553°E

Franciscan Church
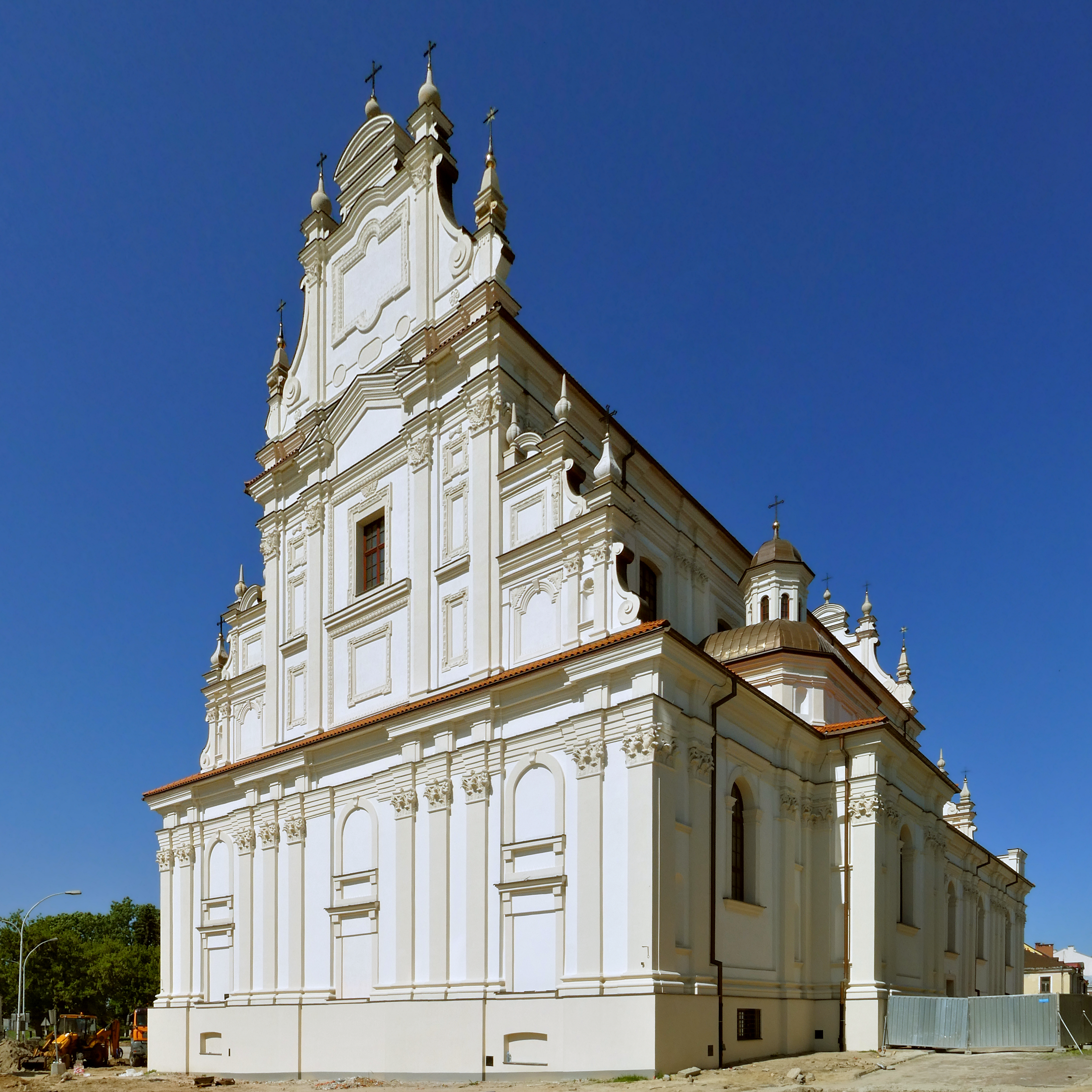
- Interactive map of the Franciscan Church area

General information
- Architectural style: Baroque
- Location: Zamość, Poland
- Construction started: 1637
- Completed: 1685
- Demolished: 1887 (partially)
- Client: Franciscan Order

Design and construction
- Architects: Jan Jaroszewicz, Jan Wolff, Jan Michał Link

Church of the Annunciation to the Blessed Virgin Mary (Polish: Kościół Zwiastowania NMP w Zamościu) commonly known as the Franciscan Church (Polish: Kościół Franciszkanów) is a Baroque Franciscan church in the Old Town in Zamość, dedicated to the Annunciation. This largest church in Zamość (56-meter long and 29-meter wide) was regarded as one of the most prominent 17th-century churches in Poland.

== History ==
The construction of one of the largest 17th-century Polish churches began with the arrival in the city of the Franciscan friars in 1637; it was founded by Jan "Sobiepan" Zamoyski and erected in Baroque style on the site of the former Bourse, an association of merchants. The construction work began under Jan Jaroszewicz and Jan Wolff between 1637 and 1665, and was completed by the artillery major Jan Michał Link (Linek) of Prawdzic coat of arms between 1680 and 1685.

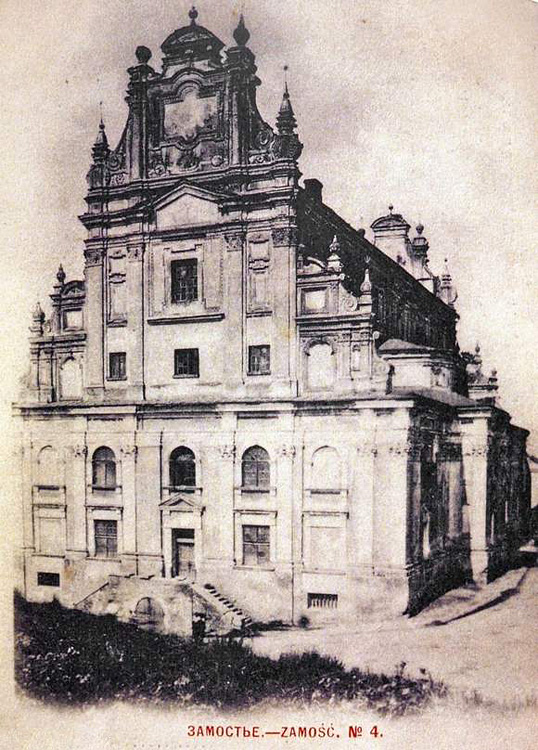
Franciscan Church in the 1880s

The structure, taller and larger than the other churches in the city (even Zamość Cathedral), consisted of three aisles, a semicircular chancel and two side chapels. The interior of the church was decorated with a profuse polychromy and sculptures. The present site of Liberty Square was occupied by a Franciscan monastery, and in the north-western corner the bell tower was erected.

The greatest changes occurred during the Partitions of Poland in 1784, after the takeover of the city by the Austrians, when the order was suppressed. During the period of modernization in the Zamość Fortress under Russian rule, the church building was turned into a military store. The interior was divided into tiers, the bell tower and the monastery were torn down slightly later. The most significant changes in the building's outer appearance occurred in 1887, when the roof was lowered, the high peaks were pulled down and the vaulting inside the church was changed into a simple slab.

Then the church building was used by numerous institutions, including County Council, museum, and cinema, which was located here until 1994. After World War II the Fine Arts High School occupied the western part of the building. In 1993, the structure was returned to the Franciscan friars, who started its reconstruction.

== See also ==
- Baroque in Poland

== Bibliography ==
1. Miłobędzki, Adam (1980), Architektura polska XVII wieku (Polish architecture of the 17th century), Polish Scientific Publishers PWN, ISBN 83-01-01363-X.
