= Zamość Town Hall =

Building in Zamość, Poland

- Ratusz w Zamościu
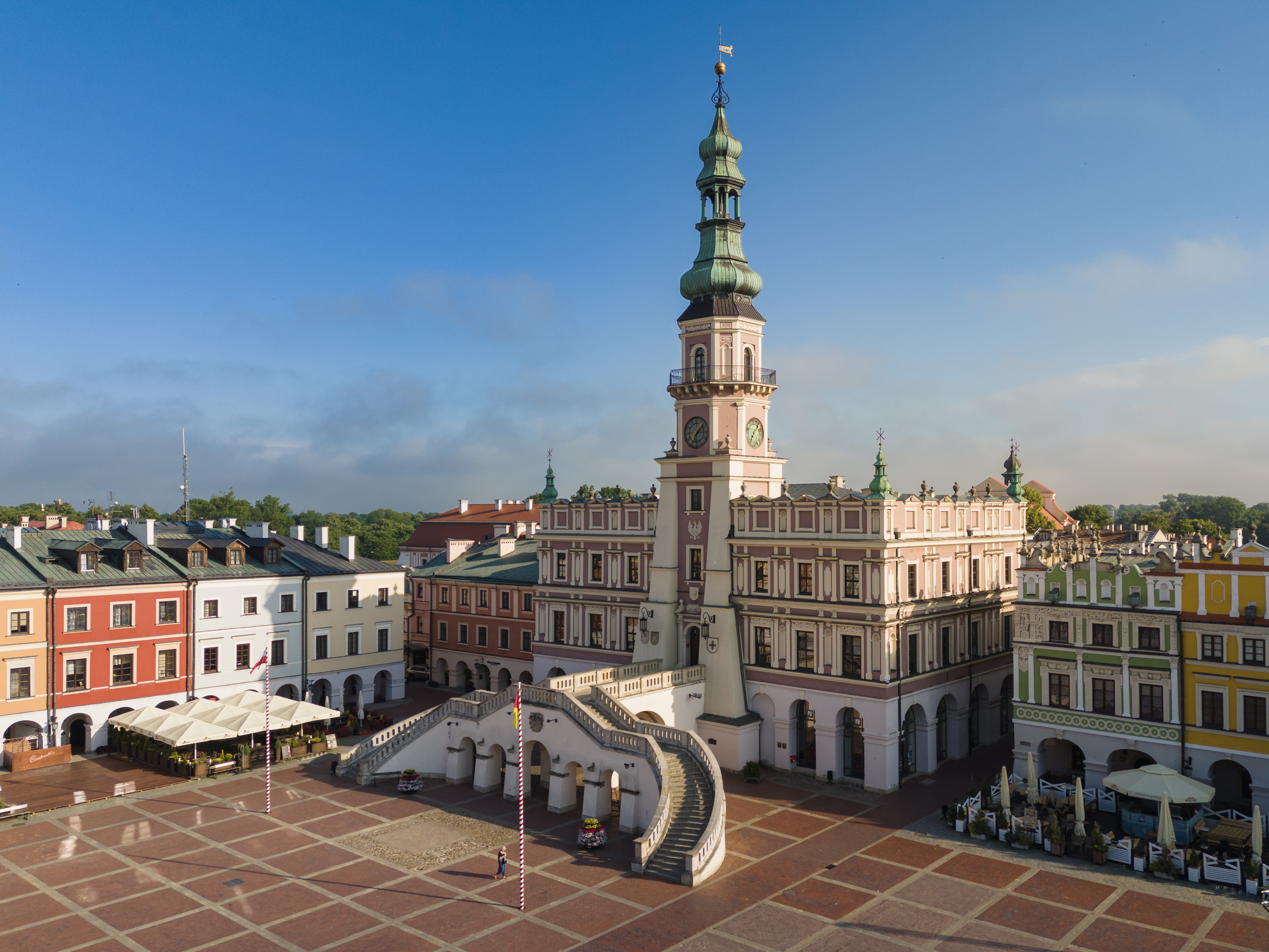
- Interactive map of the Zamość Town Hall area

General information
- Architectural style: Renaissance, Baroque
- Location: Zamość, Poland
- Coordinates: 50°43′03.2″N 23°15′09.1″E
- Year built: 16th century

Design and construction
- Designations: Register of monuments

The Town Hall in Zamość is a Baroque building in the Old Town area of Zamość, Poland. It is located on the northern side of the market square and features a 52-meter clocktower. The area in which the town hall resides is a UNESCO World Heritage Site, and the town hall itself is on the register of monuments in Poland.

The complex houses an annex, the town council, and a tourist information center.

== History ==
Construction of a town hall in Zamość began in the late 16th century to the designs of Bernardo Morando. The building has been heavily modified since the 16th century, and the prominent fan-shaped staircase was added two centuries later. The tower was also added in the late 18th century.

Since the 16th century, the building has had a long tradition of playing a bugle from the tower. However, Hetman Jan Zamoyski forbade the bugle to be played in the direction of Krakow due to political competition. In 2020, a ceremony was held to play the bugle in all four cardinal directions, including towards Krakow.

== Architecture ==
The building is a combination of Baroque and Renaissance styles. It features a double-domed tower and a wide, fan-shaped, double stairway at the facade.

The historical significance and physical complexity of the structure have made it a popular subject for cultural heritage research teams.

== See also ==
- Baroque in Poland
