= Apteka Rektorska =

Oldest pharmacy in Poland

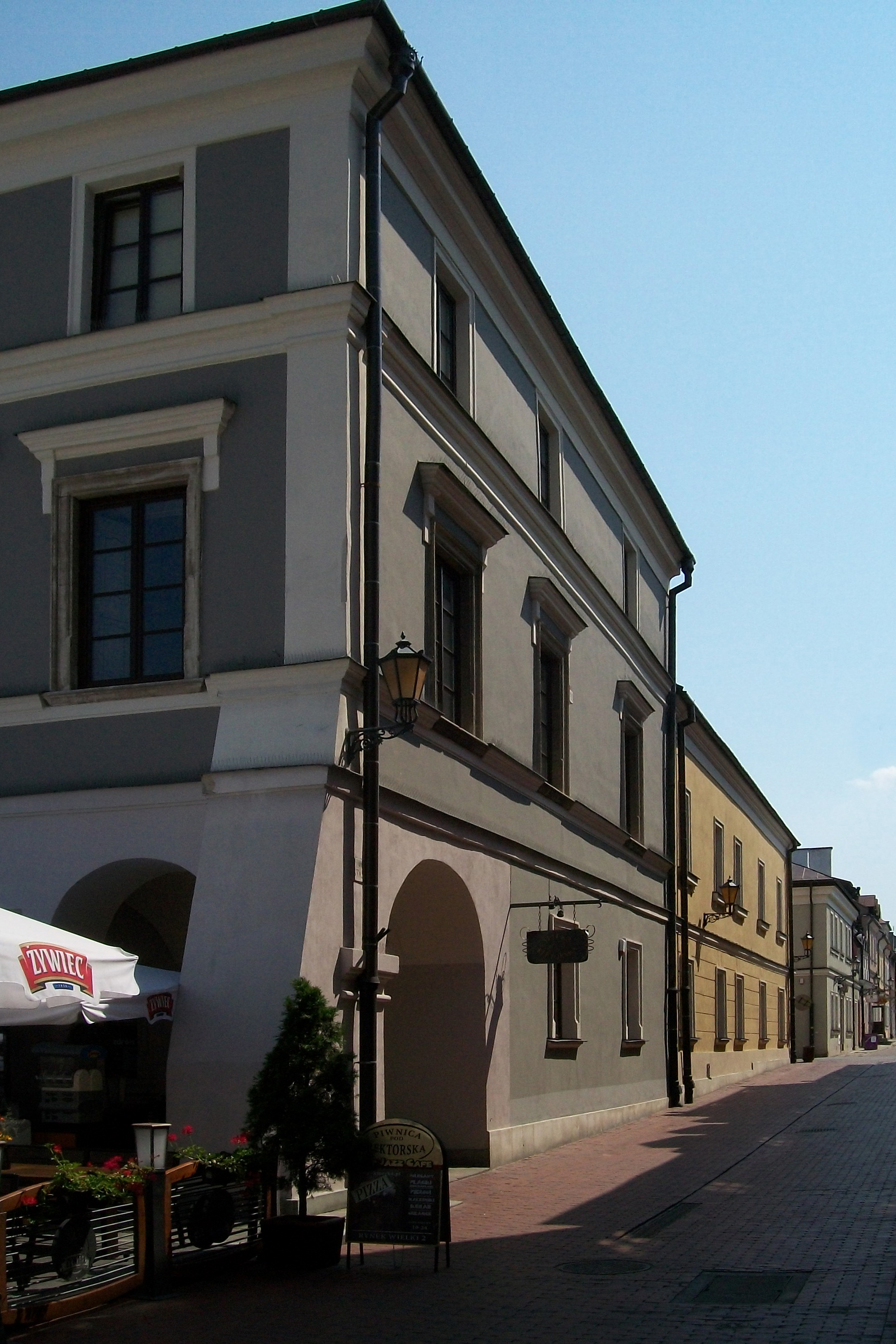
Rector's Pharmacy in Zamość

Apteka Rektorska (Rector's Pharmacy) in Zamość is a historic pharmacy located in the Renaissance building at the Main Square 2 in the Old Town. It is the oldest pharmacy still operating today in Zamość, but also, the oldest pharmacy in Poland. It has been operating continuously since 1609.

The founder of the pharmacy at this location was Szymon Piechowicz, professor of the Zamojski Academy. Piechowicz was a student of the Academy soon after it was founded in 1595. He went on to study at the Jagiellonian University in Kraków where he received the diploma and title of the bakałarz of arts (Artium Baccalaureus in Middle Latin). In 1603 he was invited back to Zamojski Academy as lecturer at the Faculty of Logic. In 1607 he went abroad to study in Italy and received the title od medical doctor at the Padua University on 25 February 1609. He returned to Zamość and took over the Faculty of Medicine. He was elected Rector of the Academy seven times in thirteen years between 1611 and 1624, with the well-earned reputation of a Renaissance man.
