= Zamość Cathedral =

Coordinates: 50.7164°N 23.2503°E

Cathedral of the Resurrection and St. Thomas the Apostle
- Katedra Zmartwychwstania Pańskiego i św. Tomasza Apostoła
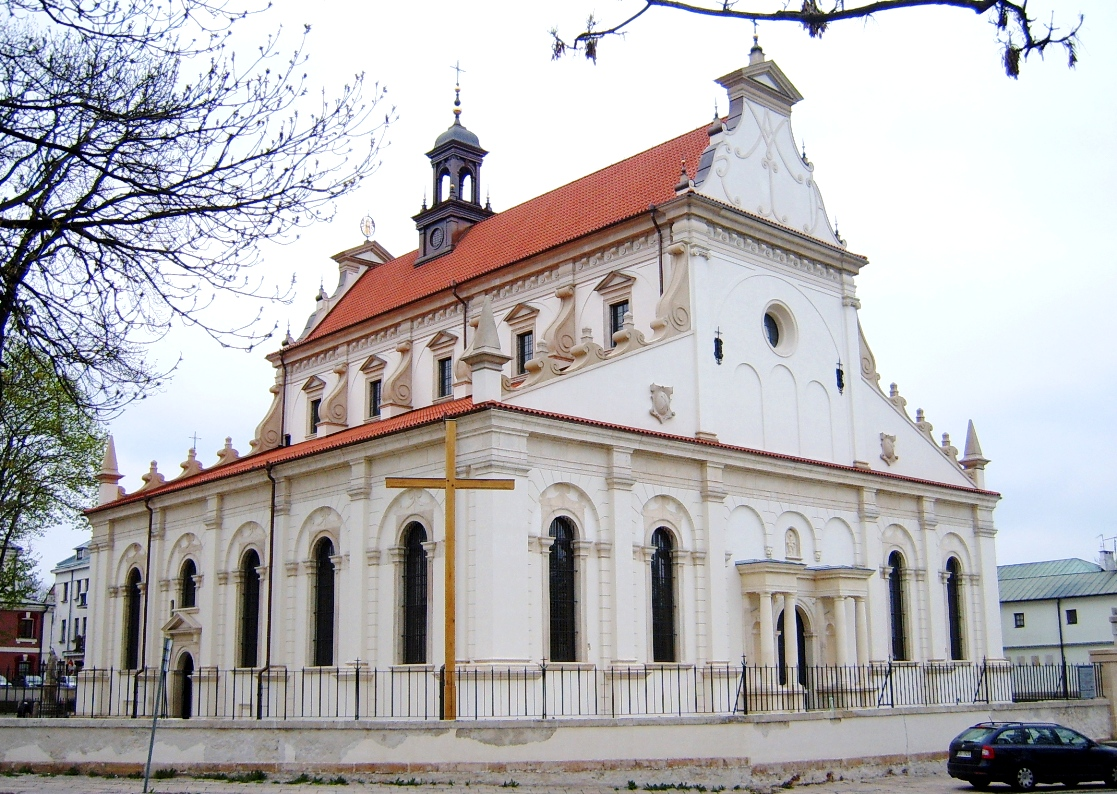
- Cathedral of the Resurrection and St. Thomas the Apostle
- Location: Zamość
- Country: Poland
- Denomination: Roman Catholic Church

The Cathedral of the Resurrection and St. Thomas the Apostle (Polish: Katedra Zmartwychwstania Pańskiego i św. Tomasza Apostoła ), commonly known as Zamość Cathedral, is a religious building that is affiliated with the Catholic Church and is located in the old town of Zamość, a city in southeastern Poland.

It is a church built in the late 16th century. It is located in the so-called Route of Renaissance. The Cathedral was established by the city's founder, Jan Zamoyski, and the author of the project was architect Bernardo Morando, an Italian, who took as a reference to the Italian churches of centuries XV and XVI. Initially it was a collegiate church until 1992, when the Diocese of Zamosc-Lubaczów, who rose to the rank of cathedral by decision of then Pope John Paul II was established.

== See also ==
- Roman Catholicism in Poland
- St. Thomas's Cathedral

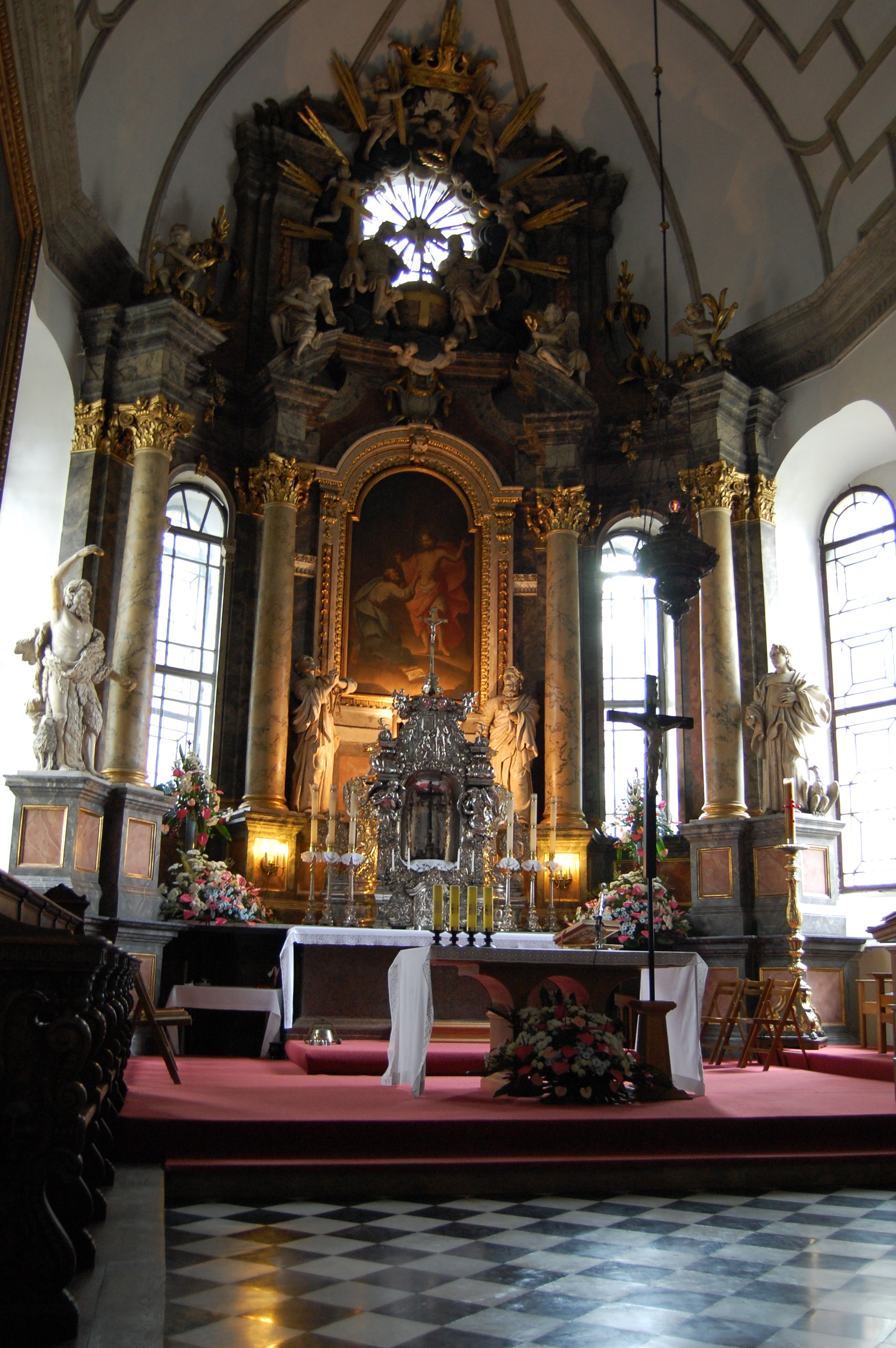
Internal view
