= Andrzej Abrek =

Polish philosopher

Andrzej Abrek (died 1700) was a Polish philosopher. A rector and professor, he was the author of several Latin panegyrics.
