= Niedzieliska =

Niedzieliska may refer to the following places:

- Niedzieliska, Lesser Poland Voivodeship (south Poland)
- Niedzieliska, Łódź Voivodeship (central Poland)
- Niedzieliska, Lublin Voivodeship (east Poland)
  - Niedzieliska-Kolonia
