= Białowola =

- Village
- Location within Poland
- Coordinates: 50°39′N 23°16′E
- Country: Poland
- Voivodeship: Lublin
- County: Zamość
- Gmina: Zamość

Białowola [bjawɔˈvɔla] is a village in the administrative district of Gmina Zamość, within Zamość County, Lublin Voivodeship, in eastern Poland.

== History ==
The first mention of the town was made in the census of 1564 as Biała Wolia. It was founded in the first half of the 16th century, by Nicolas of Leipzig, a member of Clan Korczak and nephew of Dymitr of Goraj. In 1631 the town was sold to the Zamoyski family, whereupon it was incorporated into the possessions of the Zamoyski magnate.

=== World War II ===
During the Nazi occupation of Poland, several nearby villages were colonized by ethnic Germans. Though well-guarded by German soldiers, colonists were nevertheless attacked often by Polish militia groups. The Nazis retaliated against any group found to be aiding and abetting the militias.

After an attack in the nearby village of Lipsko, Nazi soldiers looted Białowola in retaliation for rendering aid to the guerillas. 51 people were killed, including 22 women and 12 children aged 8 months to 10 years.

Today a monument exists at the site of the mass grave. Its inscription reads:

"Tu spoczywają zwłoki Polaków, mieszkańców wsi Białowola, wymordowanych przez krwawych katów hitlerowskich dnia 29 XII 1942 r."
(Translation: Here lie the bodies of Poles, inhabitants of the village Białowola murdered by the bloody Hitlerite executioners on 29th of December, 1942.)

The Nazis went on to kill 14 more residents during the course of occupation.
