= Żdanówek =

- Village
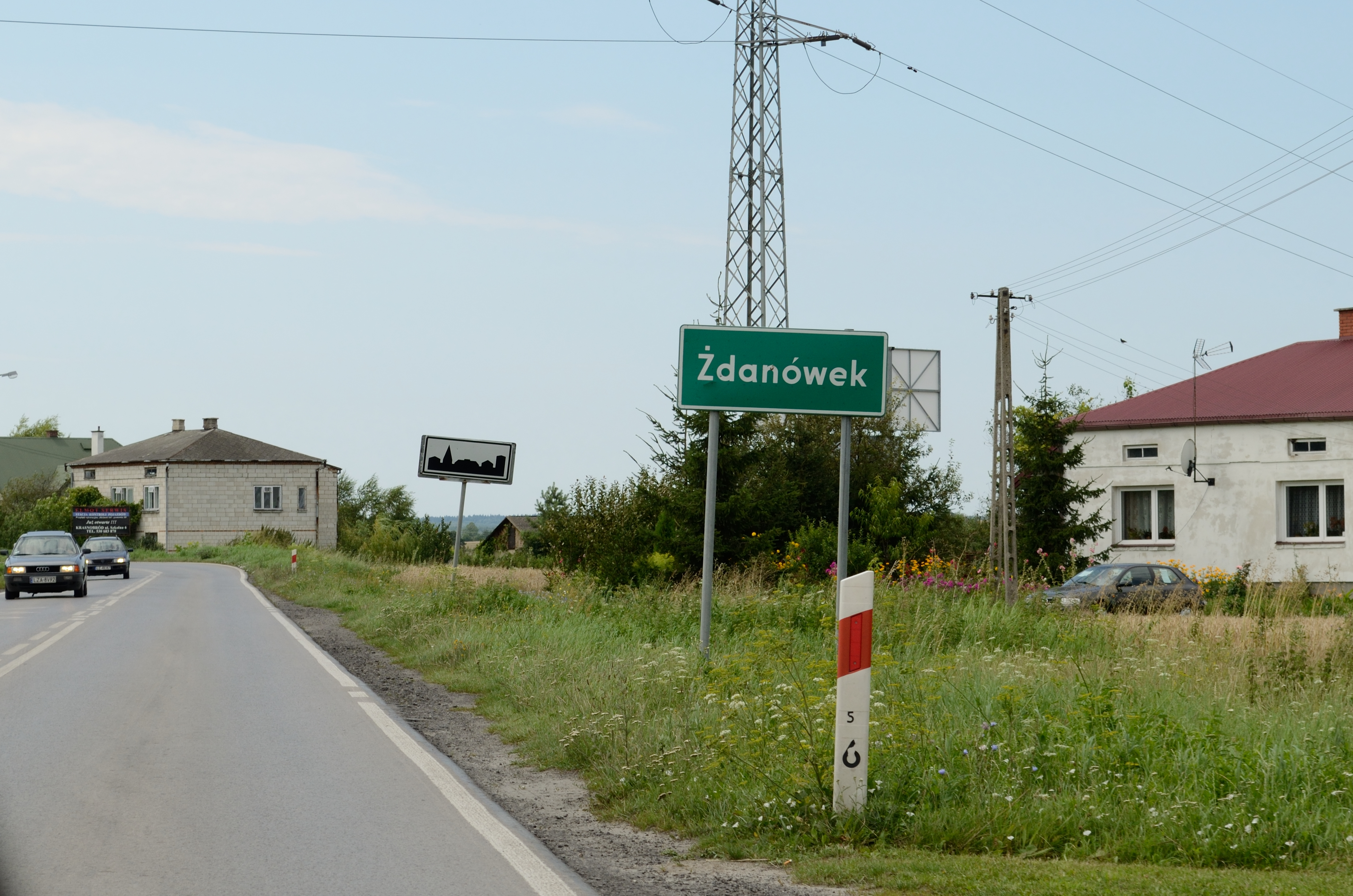

- Location within Poland
- Coordinates: 50°40′46″N 23°12′6″E
- Country: Poland
- Voivodeship: Lublin
- County: Zamość
- Gmina: Zamość

Żdanówek [ʐdaˈnuvɛk] is a village in the administrative district of Gmina Zamość, within Zamość County, Lublin Voivodeship, in eastern Poland.

== History ==
The village was established on the land of the village of Żdanów in the first half of the nineteenth century between 1827 (at that time it is not yet in the census) and 1837 (it was visible in the plan of the Ordinary estate). A village not mentioned in the Zinberg list, as well as in the Geographic Dictionary of the Kingdom of Poland.

Despite the official creation of a separate town, it was still treated as part of Zhdanov. In subsequent years, the name Żdanówek disappears up to the beginning of the 20th century - to the general census of 1921, described then as a village and farm in Zdanówek in the municipality of Mokre, it had 46 houses and 341 residents, including 3 Rusinów. The final isolation of the village from the home town of Zhdanova took place only on the basis of the administrative reform, that is after 2 August 1919.
