= Źrebce, Lublin Voivodeship =

Źrebce
- Village
- Location within Poland
- Coordinates: 50°45′N 22°56′E
- Country: Poland
- Voivodeship: Lublin
- County: Zamość
- Gmina: Sułów

Źrebce [ˈʑrɛpt͡sɛ] is a village in the administrative district of Gmina Sułów, within Zamość County, Lublin Voivodeship, in eastern Poland.
