= Wysokie, Zamość County =

Wysokie
- Village
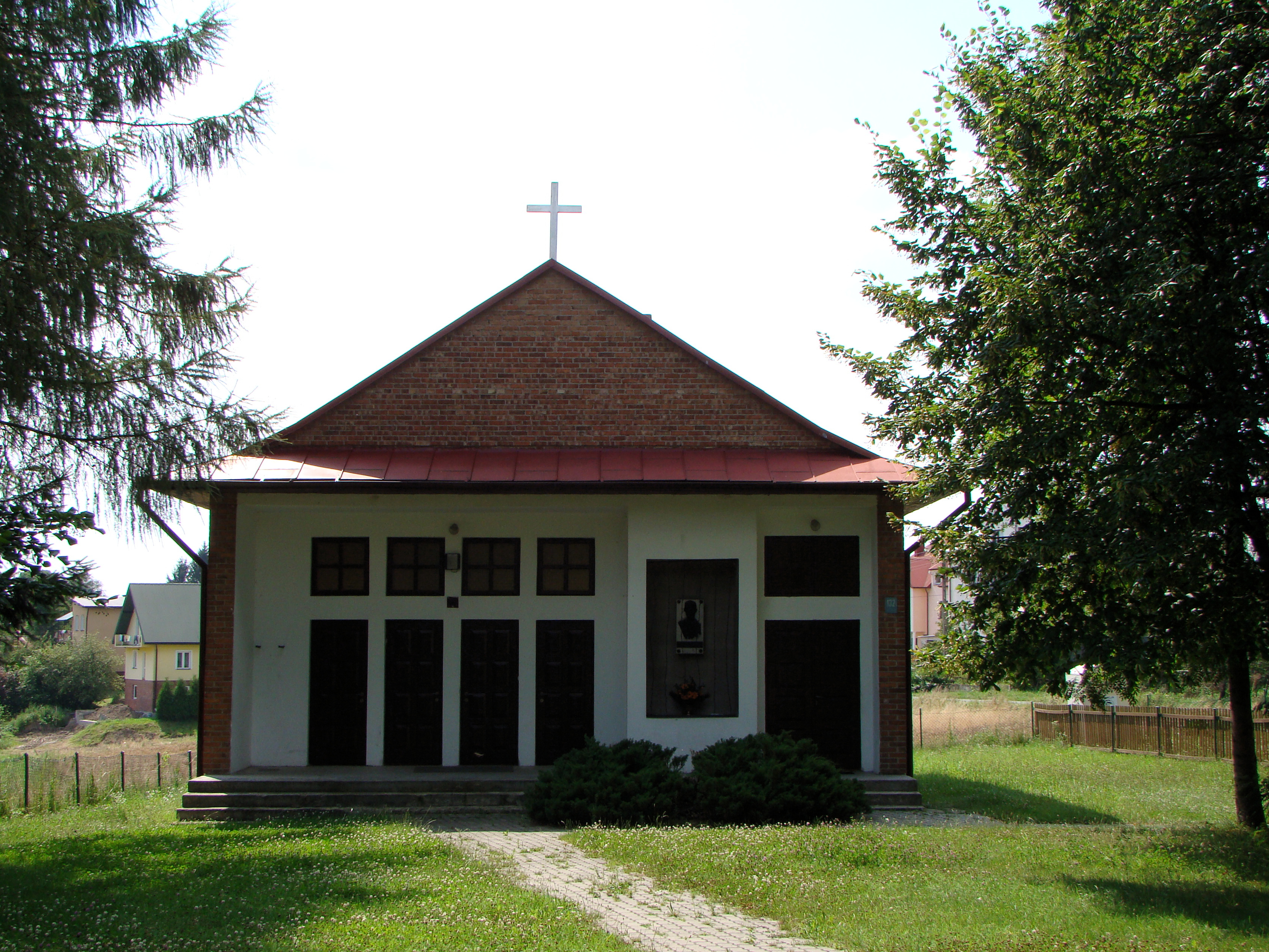
- Maximilian Kolbe Church in Wysokie

- Location within Poland
- Coordinates: 50°45′35″N 23°12′38″E
- Country: Poland
- Voivodeship: Lublin
- County: Zamość
- Gmina: Zamość

Wysokie [vɨˈsɔkʲɛ] is a village in the administrative district of Gmina Zamość, within Zamość County, Lublin Voivodeship, in eastern Poland.
