= Kawęczyn, Zamość County =

Kawęczyn
- Village
- Location within Poland
- Coordinates: 50°41′N 22°57′E
- Country: Poland
- Voivodeship: Lublin
- County: Zamość
- Gmina: Szczebrzeszyn
- Time zone: UTC+1 (CET)
  - Summer (DST): UTC+2 (CEST)

Kawęczyn [kaˈvɛnt͡ʂɨn] is a village in the administrative district of Gmina Szczebrzeszyn, within Zamość County, Lublin Voivodeship, in eastern Poland.

== History ==
Eleven Polish citizens were murdered by Nazi Germany in the village during World War II.
