= Zalesie, Zamość County =

Zalesie
- Village
- Location within Poland
- Coordinates: 50°38′51″N 23°16′43″E
- Country: Poland
- Voivodeship: Lublin
- County: Zamość
- Gmina: Zamość

Zalesie [zaˈlɛɕɛ] is a village in the administrative district of Gmina Zamość, within Zamość County, Lublin Voivodeship, in eastern Poland.
