= Sitaniec-Kolonia =

- Village
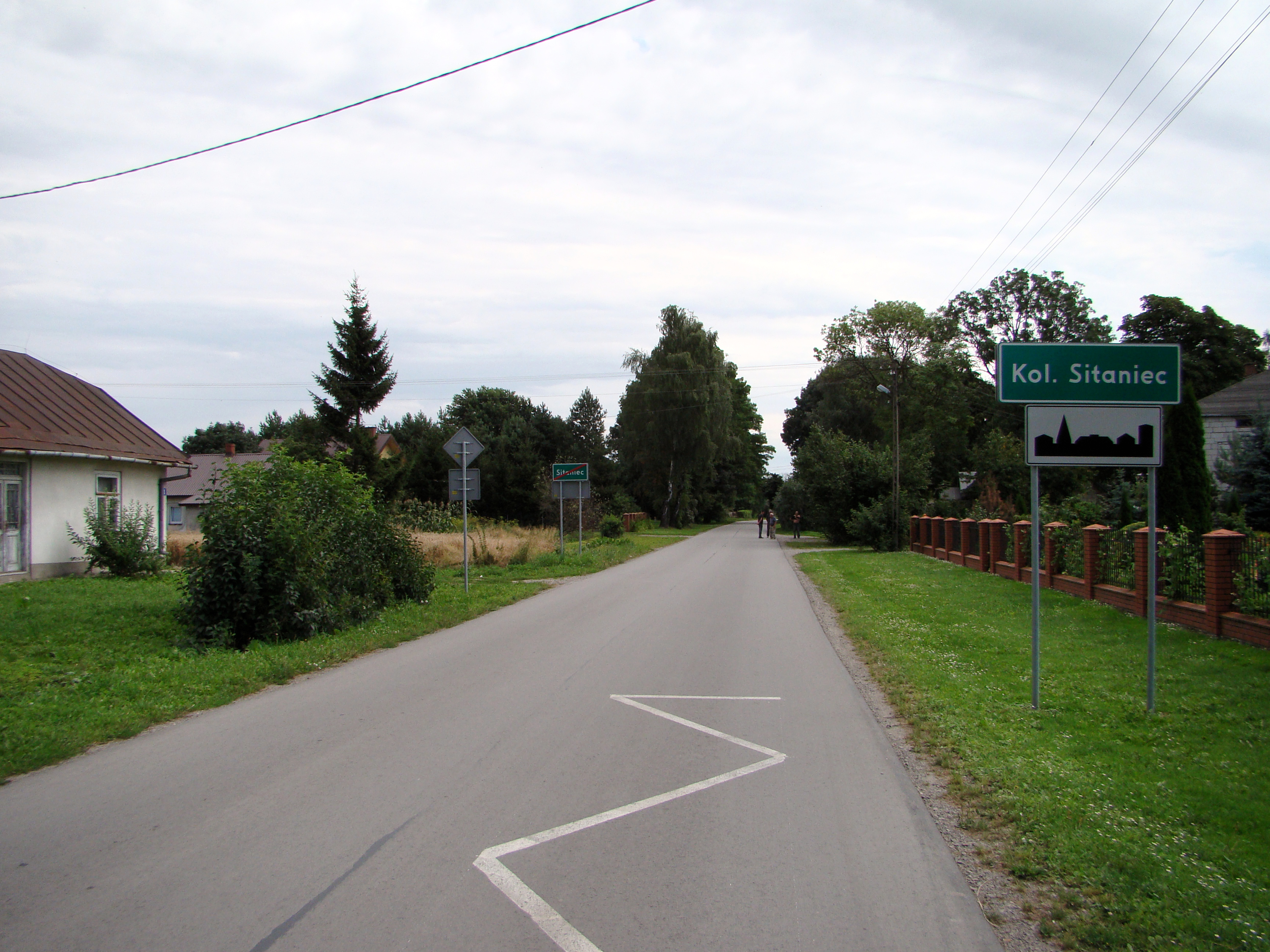
- Road through the village

- Location within Poland
- Coordinates: 50°45′46″N 23°14′58″E
- Country: Poland
- Voivodeship: Lublin
- County: Zamość
- Gmina: Zamość

Sitaniec-Kolonia [ɕiˈtaɲɛt͡s kɔˈlɔɲa] is a village in the administrative district of Gmina Zamość, within Zamość County, Lublin Voivodeship, in eastern Poland.
