= Szopinek =

- Village
- Location within Poland
- Coordinates: 50°43′19″N 23°18′49″E
- Country: Poland
- Voivodeship: Lublin
- County: Zamość
- Gmina: Zamość
- Population: 471

Szopinek [ʂɔˈpinɛk] is a village in the administrative district of Gmina Zamość, within Zamość County, Lublin Voivodeship, in eastern Poland.
