= Kąty Pierwsze =

- Village
- Location within Poland
- Coordinates: 50°42′55″N 23°06′19″E
- Country: Poland
- Voivodeship: Lublin
- County: Zamość
- Gmina: Szczebrzeszyn

Kąty Pierwsze [ˈkɔntɨ ˈpjɛrfʂɛ] is a village in the administrative district of Gmina Szczebrzeszyn, within Zamość County, Lublin Voivodeship, in eastern Poland.
