= Kąty Drugie =

- Village
- Location within Poland
- Coordinates: 50°41′25″N 23°06′34″E
- Country: Poland
- Voivodeship: Lublin
- County: Zamość
- Gmina: Szczebrzeszyn

Kąty Drugie [ˈkɔntɨ ˈdruɡʲɛ] is a village in the administrative district of Gmina Szczebrzeszyn, within Zamość County, Lublin Voivodeship, in eastern Poland.
