= Wieprzec, Lublin Voivodeship =

Wieprzec
- Village
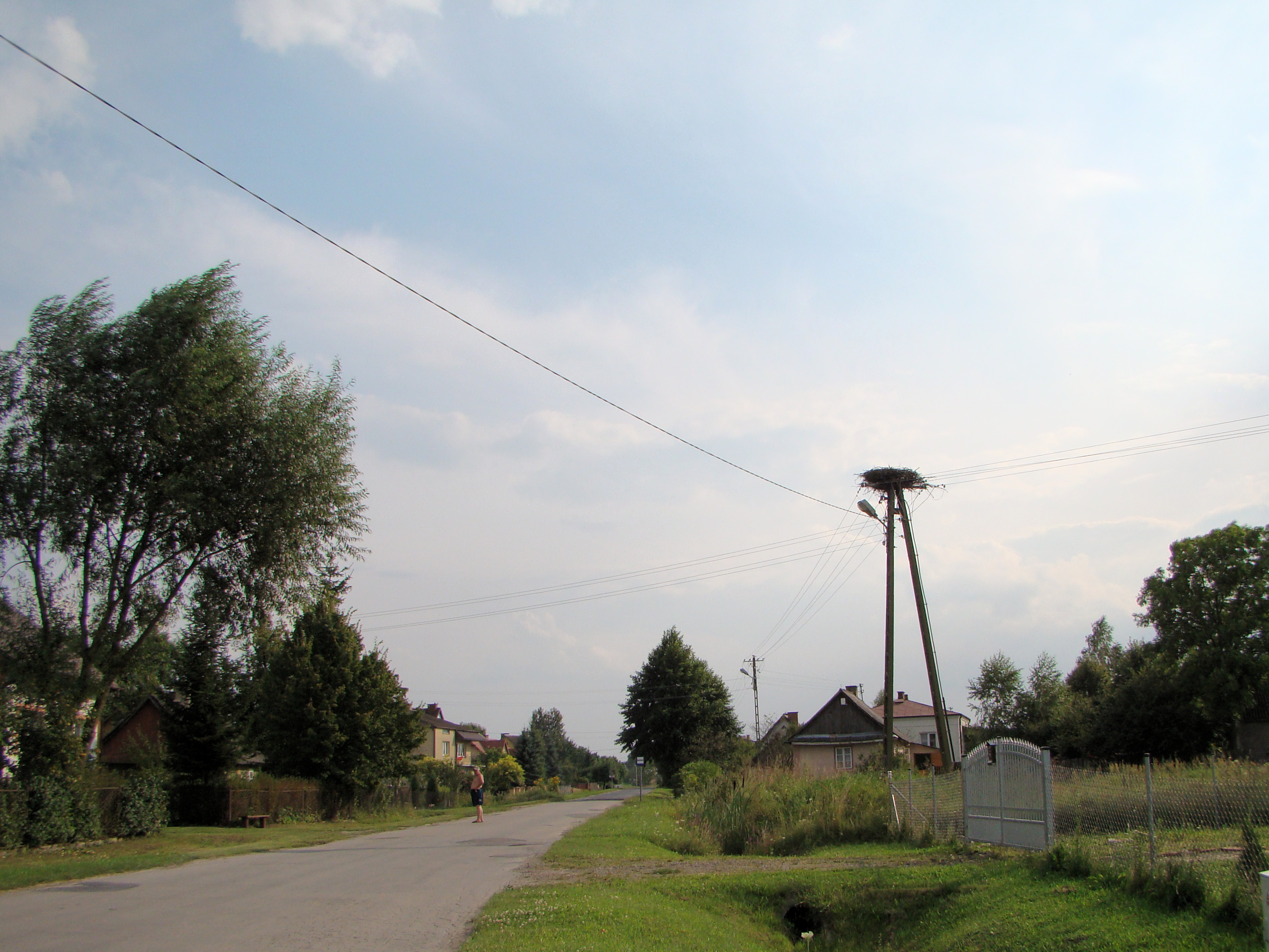
- Road through the village

- Location within Poland
- Coordinates: 50°39′17″N 23°10′1″E
- Country: Poland
- Voivodeship: Lublin
- County: Zamość
- Gmina: Zamość

Wieprzec [ˈvjɛpʂɛt͡s] is a village in the administrative district of Gmina Zamość, within Zamość County, Lublin Voivodeship, in eastern Poland.

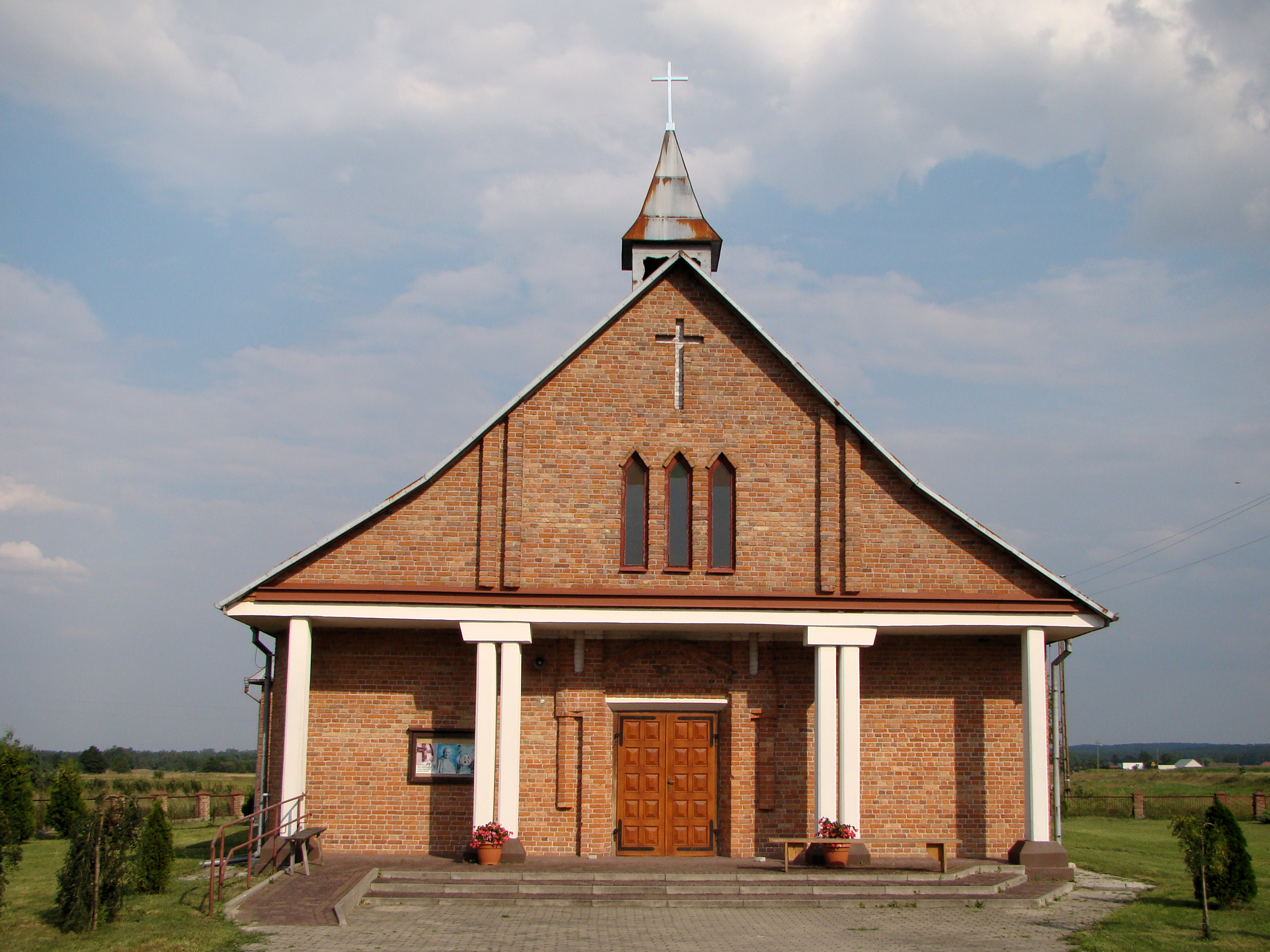
Saints Peter and Paul Church in Wieprzec
