= Kalinowice, Lublin Voivodeship =

Kalinowice
- Village
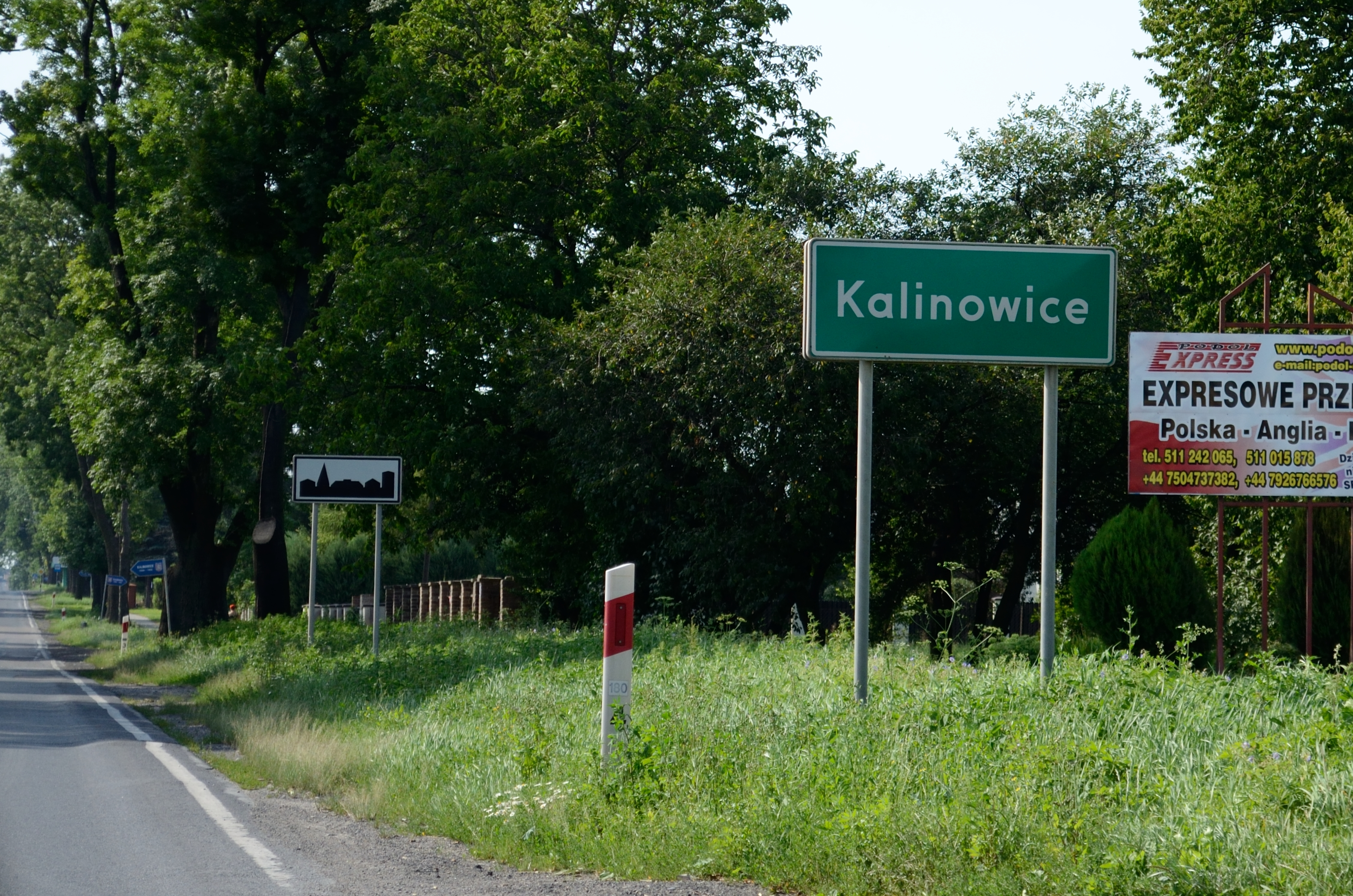

- Location within Poland
- Coordinates: 50°41′55″N 23°17′22″E
- Country: Poland
- Voivodeship: Lublin
- County: Zamość
- Gmina: Zamość
- Time zone: UTC+1 (CET)
  - Summer (DST): UTC+2 (CEST)

Kalinowice [kalinɔˈvit͡sɛ] is a village in the administrative district of Gmina Zamość, within Zamość County, Lublin Voivodeship, in eastern Poland.

== History ==
Six Polish citizens were murdered by Nazi Germany in the village during World War II.
