= Bortatycze =

- Village
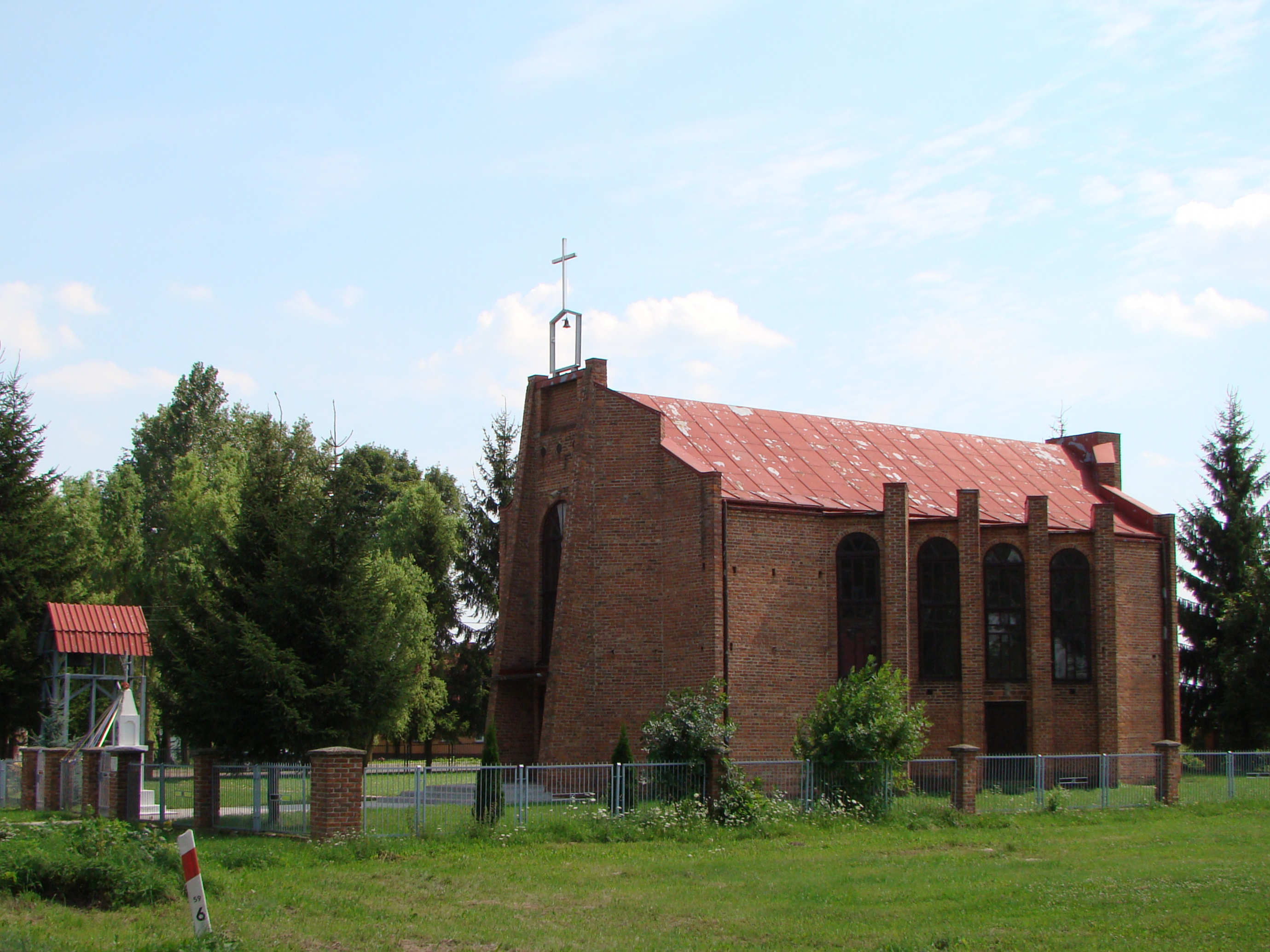
- Our Lady of Fátima Church in Bortatycze

- Location within Poland
- Coordinates: 50°46′N 23°11′E
- Country: Poland
- Voivodeship: Lublin
- County: Zamość
- Gmina: Zamość

Bortatycze [bɔrtaˈtɨt͡ʂɛ] is a village in the administrative district of Gmina Zamość, within Zamość County, Lublin Voivodeship, in eastern Poland.
