= Brody Małe, Lublin Voivodeship =

Brody Małe
- Village
- Location within Poland
- Coordinates: 50°41′N 22°59′E
- Country: Poland
- Voivodeship: Lublin
- County: Zamość
- Gmina: Szczebrzeszyn

Brody Małe [ˈbrɔdɨ ˈmawɛ] is a village in the administrative district of Gmina Szczebrzeszyn, within Zamość County, Lublin Voivodeship, in eastern Poland.
