= Sułówek =

- Village
- Location within Poland
- Coordinates: 50°47′N 22°58′E
- Country: Poland
- Voivodeship: Lublin
- County: Zamość
- Gmina: Sułów

Sułówek [suˈwuvɛk] is a village in the administrative district of Gmina Sułów, within Zamość County, Lublin Voivodeship, in eastern Poland.
