= Białobrzegi, Zamość County =

Białobrzegi
- Village
- Location within Poland
- Coordinates: 50°46′19″N 23°9′16″E
- Country: Poland
- Voivodeship: Lublin
- County: Zamość
- Gmina: Zamość

Białobrzegi [bjawɔˈbʐɛɡi] (German: 1941–1944 Wiesental) is a village in the administrative district of Gmina Zamość, within Zamość County, Lublin Voivodeship, in eastern Poland.
