= Michalów, Zamość County =

Michalów
- Village
- Location within Poland
- Coordinates: 50°45′N 23°1′E
- Country: Poland
- Voivodeship: Lublin
- County: Zamość
- Gmina: Sułów
- Population: 1,100

Michalów [miˈxaluf] is a village in the administrative district of Gmina Sułów, within Zamość County, Lublin Voivodeship, in eastern Poland.
