= Rozłopy-Kolonia =

- Village
- Location within Poland
- Coordinates: 50°45′54″N 22°58′50″E
- Country: Poland
- Voivodeship: Lublin
- County: Zamość
- Gmina: Sułów
- Time zone: UTC+1 (CET)
  - Summer (DST): UTC+2 (CEST)

Rozłopy-Kolonia [rɔˈzwɔpɨ kɔˈlɔɲa] is a village in the administrative district of Gmina Sułów, within Zamość County, Lublin Voivodeship, in eastern Poland.

== History ==
Ten Polish citizens were murdered by Nazi Germany in the village during World War II.
