= Lipsko-Polesie =

- Village
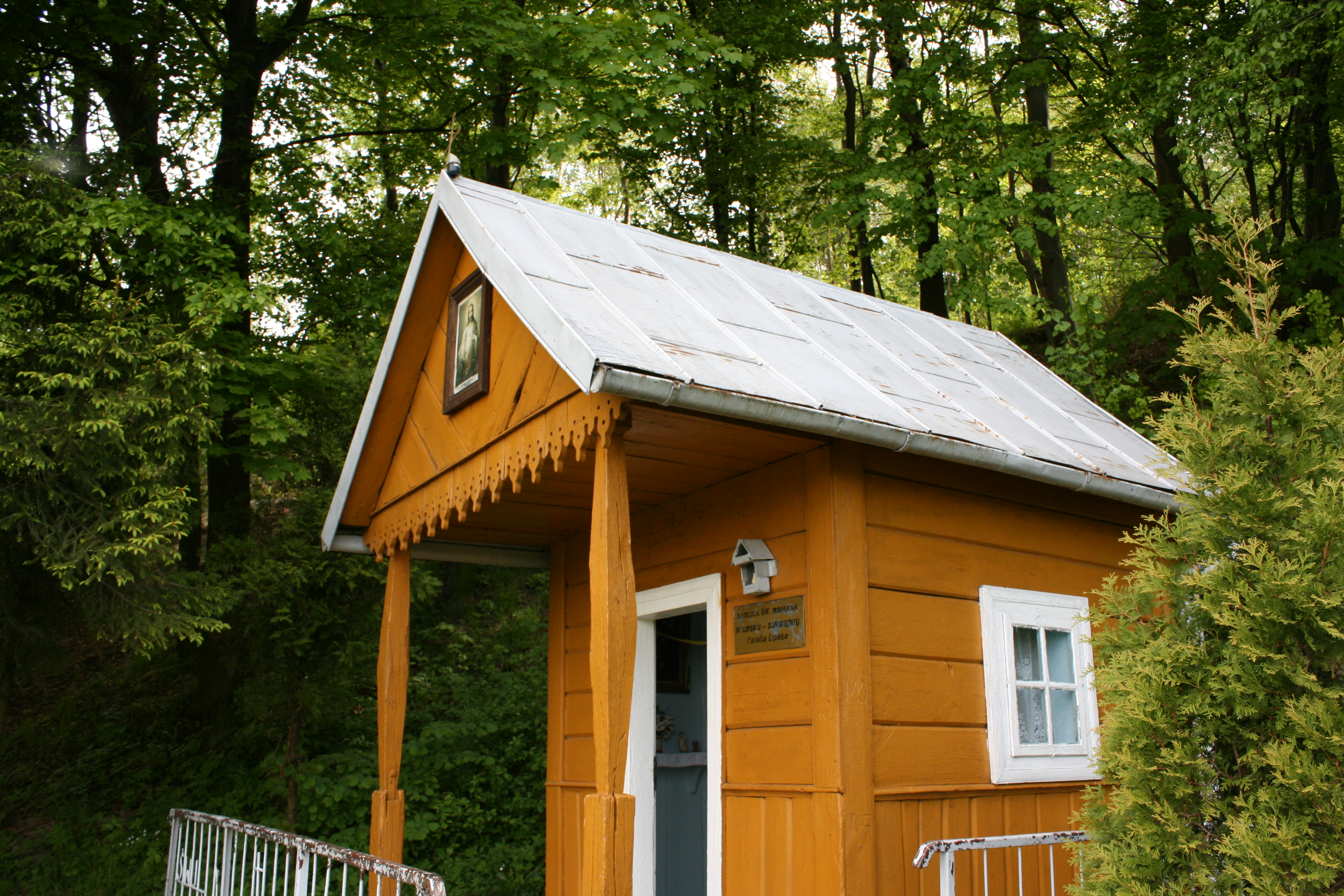
- Chapel in Lipsko-Polesie

- Location within Poland
- Coordinates: 50°38′25″N 23°12′8″E
- Country: Poland
- Voivodeship: Lublin
- County: Zamość
- Gmina: Zamość
- Time zone: UTC+1 (CET)
  - Summer (DST): UTC+2 (CEST)

Lipsko-Polesie [ˈlipskɔ pɔˈlɛɕɛ] is a village in the administrative district of Gmina Zamość, within Zamość County, Lublin Voivodeship, in eastern Poland.

== History ==
Four Polish citizens were murdered by Nazi Germany in the village during World War II.
