= Siedliska, Zamość County =

Siedliska
- Village
- Location within Poland
- Coordinates: 50°43′49″N 23°9′26″E
- Country: Poland
- Voivodeship: Lublin
- County: Zamość
- Gmina: Zamość

Siedliska [ɕɛdˈlʲiska] is a village in the administrative district of Gmina Zamość, within Zamość County, Lublin Voivodeship, in eastern Poland.
