= Zawada, Zamość County =

Zawada
- Village
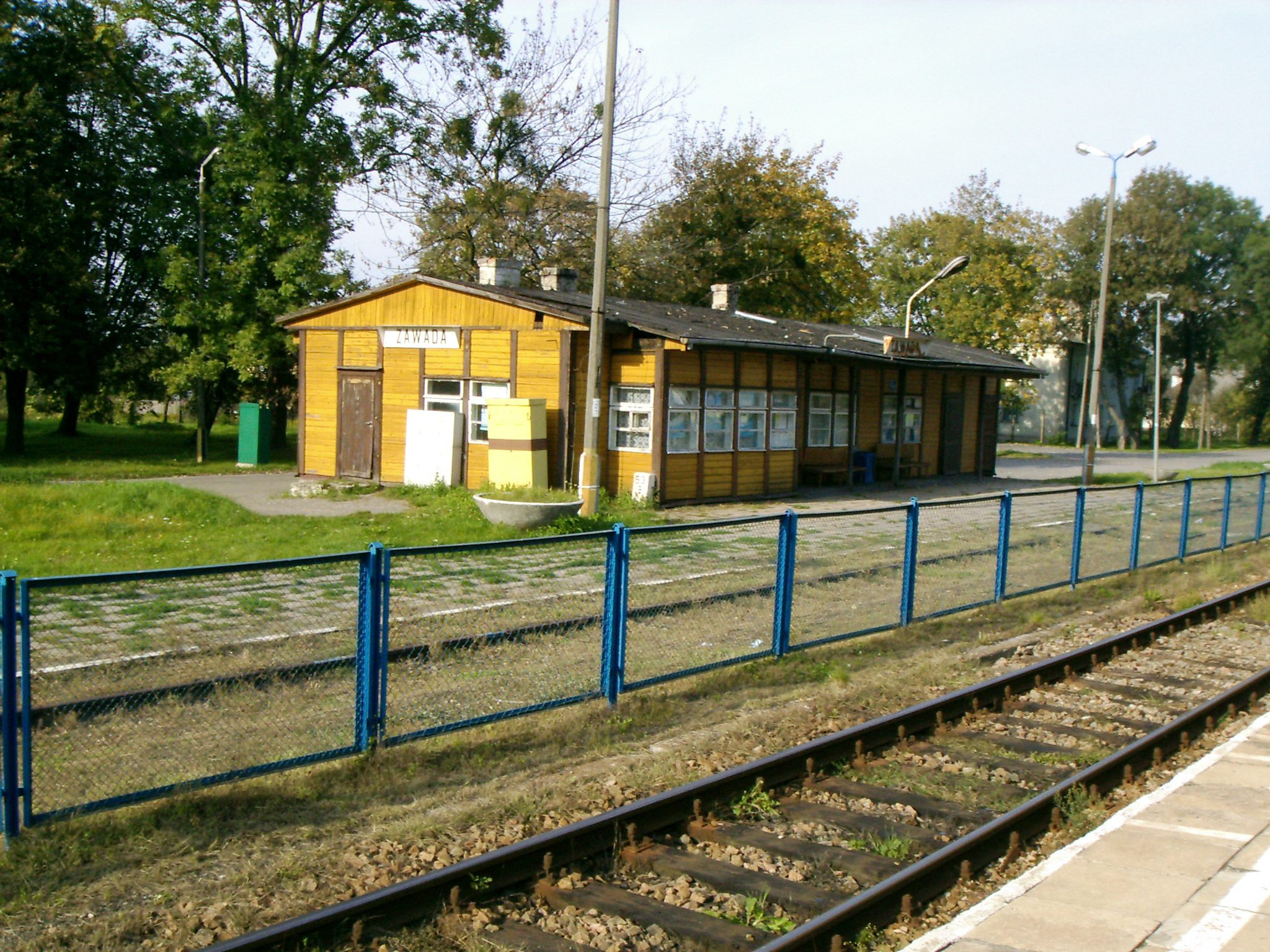
- Train station in Zawada

- Location within Poland
- Coordinates: 50°39′8″N 23°10′11″E
- Country: Poland
- Voivodeship: Lublin
- County: Zamość
- Gmina: Zamość

Population
  - Total: 2,000
- Time zone: UTC+1 (CET)
  - Summer (DST): UTC+2 (CEST)
- Website: http://www.zawada.yoyo.pl

Zawada [zaˈvada] is a village in the administrative district of Gmina Zamość, within Zamość County, Lublin Voivodeship, in eastern Poland.

== History ==
Nine Polish citizens were murdered by Nazi Germany in the village during World War II.
