= Skaraszów =

- Village
- Location within Poland
- Coordinates: 50°38′33″N 23°7′43″E
- Country: Poland
- Voivodeship: Lublin
- County: Zamość
- Gmina: Zamość

Skaraszów [skaˈraʂuf] is a village in the administrative district of Gmina Zamość, within Zamość County, Lublin Voivodeship, in eastern Poland.

== History ==
The village was founded at the beginning of the 19th century under the name of Skaraszów. Skaraszów has been mentioned on the map since 1828, however for unknown reasons it was not included in the 1827 census.
