= Majdanek, Zamość County =

Majdanek
- Village
- Location within Poland
- Coordinates: 50°39′37″N 23°12′30″E
- Country: Poland
- Voivodeship: Lublin
- County: Zamość
- Gmina: Zamość

Majdanek [mai̯ˈdanɛk] is a village in the administrative district of Gmina Zamość, within Zamość County, Lublin Voivodeship, in eastern Poland.
