= Wychody =

- Village
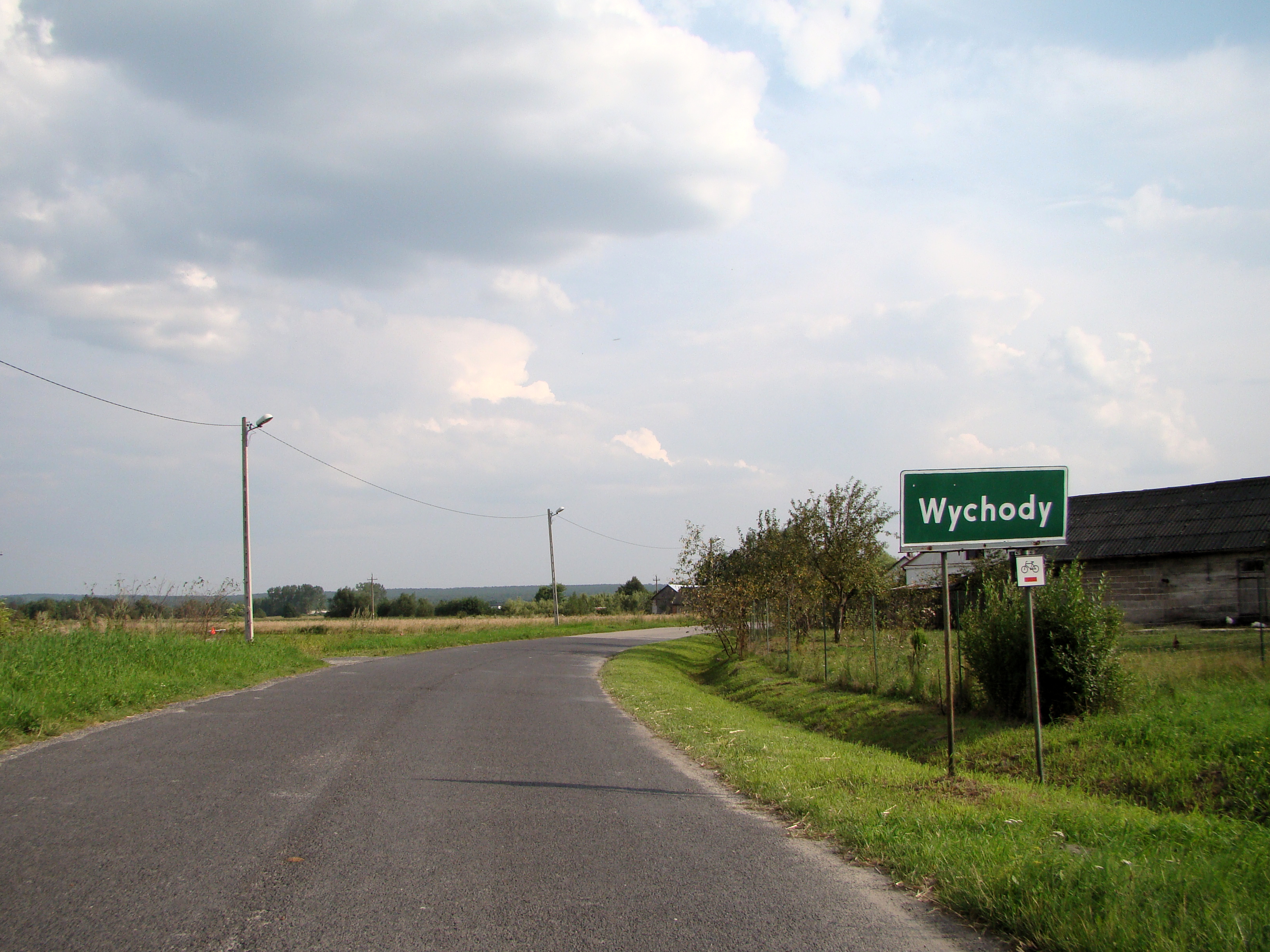
- Road through the village

- Location within Poland
- Coordinates: 50°39′46″N 23°9′8″E
- Country: Poland
- Voivodeship: Lublin
- County: Zamość
- Gmina: Zamość

Wychody [vɨˈxɔdɨ] is a village in the administrative district of Gmina Zamość in Zamość County, Lublin Voivodeship, in eastern Poland, approximately 10 km (6 mi) southwest of Zamość and 77 km (48 mi) southeast of the regional capital of Lublin.
