= Sułów-Kolonia =

- Village
- Location within Poland
- Coordinates: 50°45′40″N 22°56′29″E
- Country: Poland
- Voivodeship: Lublin
- County: Zamość
- Gmina: Sułów

Sułów-Kolonia [ˈsuwuf kɔˈlɔɲa] is a village in the administrative district of Gmina Sułów, within Zamość County, Lublin Voivodeship, in eastern Poland.
