= Borowina Sitaniecka =

- Village
- Location within Poland
- Coordinates: 50°46′6″N 23°18′3″E
- Country: Poland
- Voivodeship: Lublin
- County: Zamość
- Gmina: Zamość

Borowina Sitaniecka (Polish pronunciation: [bɔrɔˈvina ɕitaˈɲɛtska]) is a village in the administrative district of Gmina Zamość, within Zamość County, Lublin Voivodeship, in eastern Poland.
