= Zwódne =

- Village
- Location within Poland
- Coordinates: 50°40′56″N 23°15′24″E
- Country: Poland
- Voivodeship: Lublin
- County: Zamość
- Gmina: Zamość

Zwódne [ˈzvudnɛ] is a village in the administrative district of Gmina Zamość, within Zamość County, Lublin Voivodeship, in eastern Poland.
