= Zagóra, Zamość County =

Zagóra
- Settlement
- Location within Poland
- Coordinates: 50°40′3″N 23°16′58″E
- Country: Poland
- Voivodeship: Lublin
- County: Zamość
- Gmina: Zamość

Zagóra [zaˈɡura] is a settlement in the administrative district of Gmina Zamość, within Zamość County, Lublin Voivodeship, in eastern Poland.
