= Zamość Fortress =

Deconstructed fortress, museum and heritage site

Coordinates: 50°43′01″N 23°15′10″E

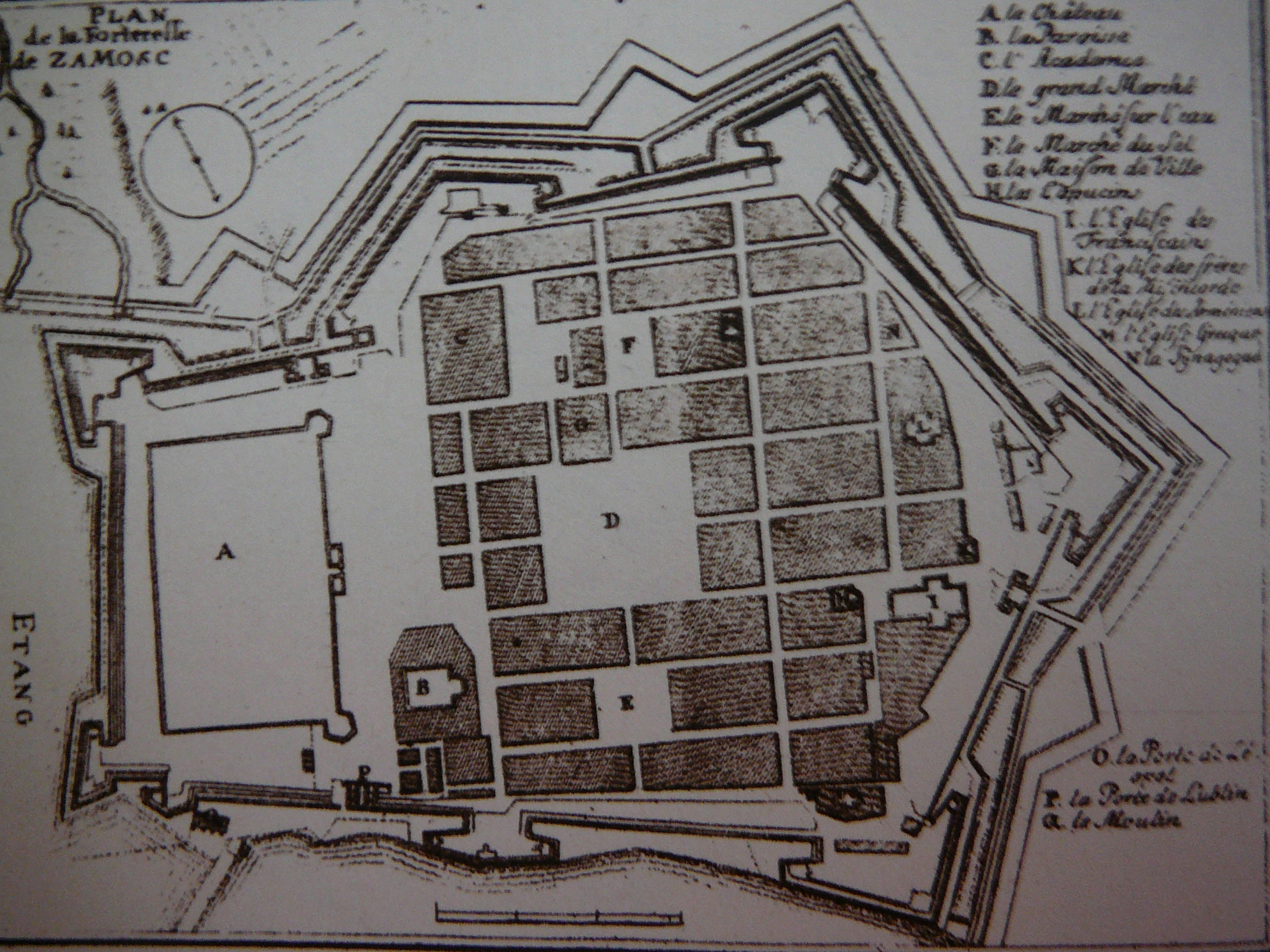
Plan from mid-17th century

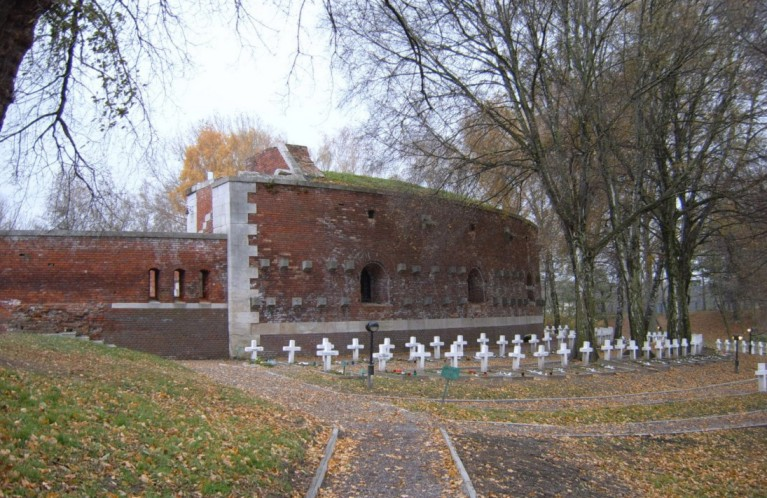
One of surviving fragments of the Fortress; today a museum.

Zamość Fortress (Polish: Twierdza Zamość) is a set of fortifications constructed together with the city of Zamość (southeastern Poland). It was built between 1579 and 1618, and the construction was initiated by Chancellor and Hetman Jan Zamoyski. It was one of the biggest fortresses of the Polish–Lithuanian Commonwealth, built so solidly that it was able to resist the attacks of both the Cossacks and the Swedes during the Deluge. It was taken down in 1866, although fragments survive.

Altogether, the fortress went through six sieges, with the first one taking place in 1648, during the Khmelnytsky Uprising. Eight years later it was surrounded by the Swedes, who came there again in 1703, then, in 1809, by the army of the Duchy of Warsaw, which captured it from the Austrians. The longest one was the siege of Zamość of 1813, when the Polish garrison for 8 months defended the fortress from the Russians. The last siege took place during the November Uprising, when Zamość was the last point of Polish defence which fell to the Russians. The fortress, which had in the meantime become obsolete, was closed down in 1866.

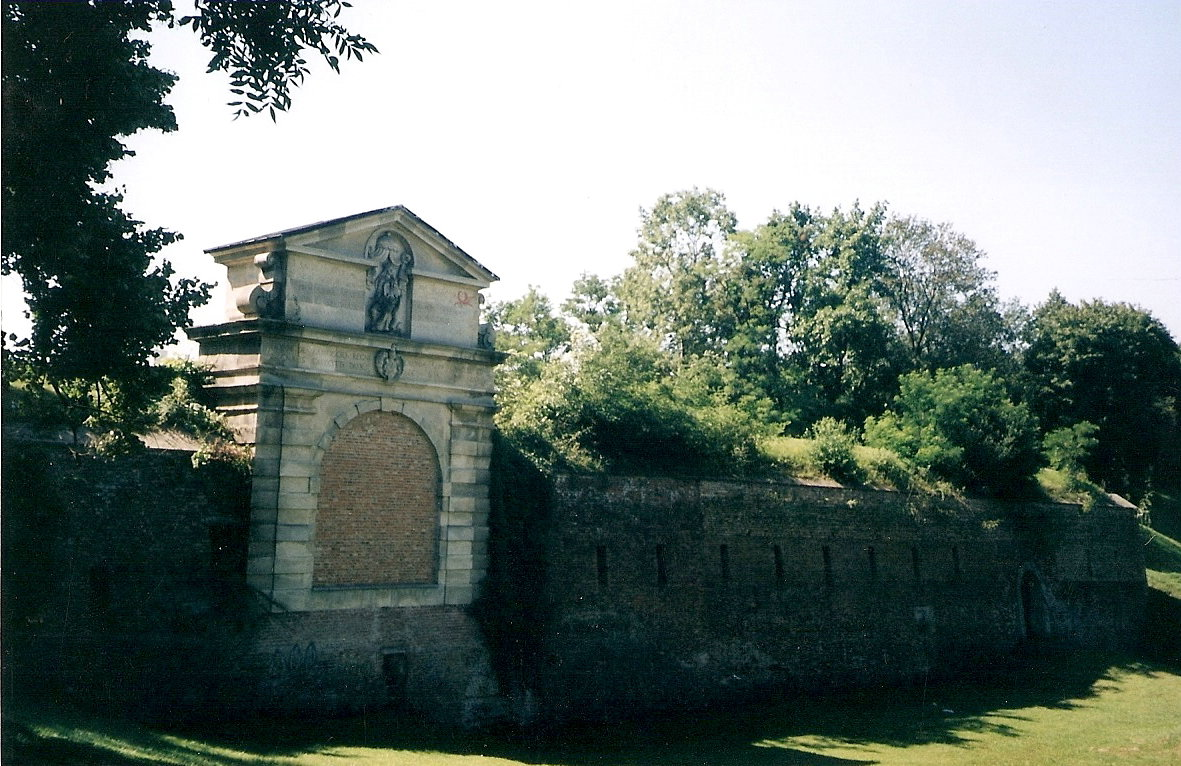
Old Lublin Gate

== Construction and later changes ==
Zamość fortress, as well as the town of Zamość, are the brainchild of Chancellor Jan Zamoyski, who in the second half of the 16th century decided to found a new, private city in the middle of nowhere, named after himself. The foundation charter was issued on April 3, 1580, and the first name of the town was Zamośćie by the Wieprzec river.

Both fortifications and the city were planned by Italian architect from Padua, Bernardo Morando. He decided to take advantage of the two local rivers — Topornica and Labunka, whose waters were used to fill the moat.

The first castle was built in 1579, and in the following years additional buildings were added — the Arsenal (1582), Lublin Gate (1588), Lwów Gate (1599) and Szczebrzeszyn Gate, completed in 1603 by Blaise Gocman, each one with a drawbridge. The entire complex was not finished until 1620, by another Italian architect, Andrea dell'Aqua, who was helped by Jan Wolff and Jan Jaroszowic. The fortress was shaped as a septangle, with seven bastions, located around 200 meters from each other, as this was the range of the 17th century artillery. The fortress, with its impressive brickwork, 12 m high and 2.5 m thick, was one of the most modern and largest strongholds of the Polish–Lithuanian Commonwealth, together with Kamieniec Podolski.

In 1683, architect Jan Michal Link began modernization of the fortress, which lasted until 1694. Walls were strengthened, and two smaller bastions were replaced by a large one. After these works, the fortress was not repaired until 1809, when government of the Duchy of Warsaw invested heavily into several changes. New gates were placed, two older gates were bricked up, bastions were enlarged. However, the works were not completed because of the French invasion of Russia.

Further improvements were continued by the government of the Congress Poland, which in 1820 bought the city from ordynat Stanislaw Kostka Zamoyski. All buildings within 1200 meters from the walls were destroyed, and within the radius of 2400 meters, only wooden structures were permitted. A Blockhaus was constructed as well as extensive entrenchments. Buildings in the town were remodelled so that they would serve the military. They were stripped of Baroque decorations and rebuilt in the neoclassicistic style.

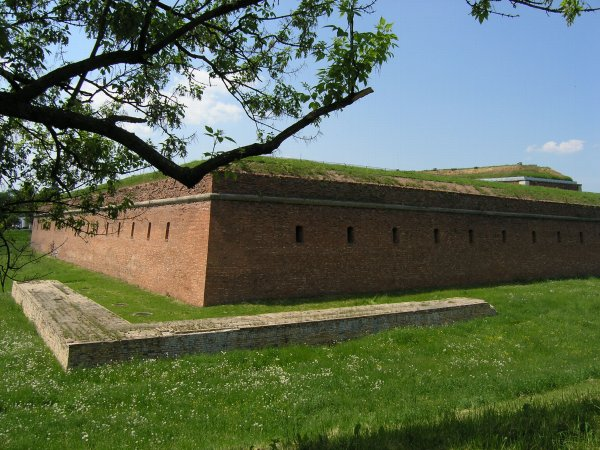
Parts of fortifications

== First siege ==
In November 1648, during the Khmelnytsky Uprising, Zamość was surrounded by joint Cossack — Tatar forces under command of Bohdan Khmelnytsky and Tugay Bey. The fortress was defended by approximately 4700 soldiers under castellan of Elbląg Ludwik Weyher and Wladyslaw Myszkowski. Also, within city walls, there were numerous refugees from lands of Red Ruthenia, Podolia and Volhynia.

On November 5, the enemy burned nearby villages, but the fortress itself was untouched. Soon afterwards, Cossack engineers managed to remove water from southern mound, exposing the wall in that area. However, Khmelnytski's forces were inadequate, and winter was approaching. Since the defenders were also aware of their difficult situation, both sides signed a truce. For the price of 20 000 talars, the Cossack-Tatar forces decided to end the siege and returned home for the winter.

== Second siege ==
In the summer of 1655, the joint Russo-Cossack forces approached near the fortress, but they did not try to capture it. Instead, when late that year Jan II Zamoyski decided to support King John II Casimir of Poland, Zamość was besieged by the Swedes (see: The Deluge (Polish history)), whose troops appeared at the gates of the stronghold on February 25, 1656. After a few days, King Charles X Gustav joined the forces.

The Swedes began with artillery barrage, but due to lack of heavy guns, it was not successful. Within a few days, Charles X Gustav realized that capturing Zamość, whose fortifications had been strengthened since 1648, was impossible, and on March 1, the invaders withdrew. Swedish siege of Zamość was later described by Henryk Sienkiewicz, in his popular book The Deluge (novel). Next year, the Transilvanian army under George II Rákóczi appeared near Zamość, but it did not even try to capture the mighty fortress. According to a legend, when Swedish representatives came to the town and proposed the capitulation of the fortress, Jan ‘Sobiepan’ Zamoyski answered: "I am the Lord for myself and I will not give Zamość to the Swedes".

In the last stage of the war, Zamość was a prison for high-ranking officers of the Swedish Army. Among those kept there, was Field Marshal Arvid Wittenberg, who died in prison of natural causes.

== Third siege ==
Late 17th century marked the decline of the Commonwealth, a decline reflected in the general state of repair of the fortress. The Great Northern War did not spare Zamość, as on February 11, 1703, Swedish units under General Magnus Stenbock approached the stronghold and besieged it. However, after a week, the Swedes withdrew, to return next year with additional troops. Polish defenders, counted at only 260, were unable to resist the attackers and quickly surrendered. Swedish occupation was short and in 1705, Cossack Ukrainian soldiers led by Hetman Ivan Mazepa, with permission of Ordynat Tomasz Jozef Zamoyski, entered Zamość. The 1000-soldier Cossack garrison remained there until May 1706.

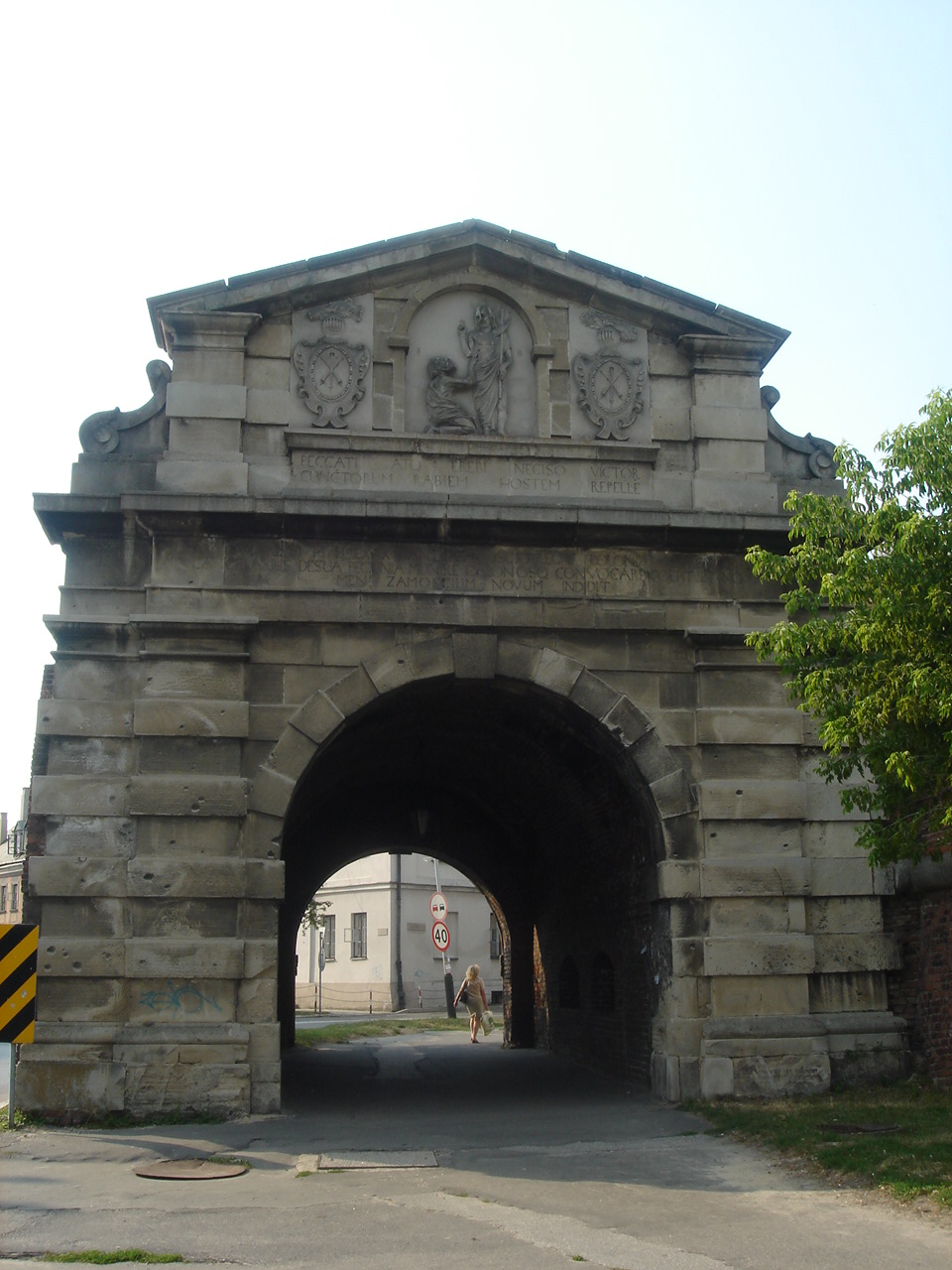
Old Lwów Gate

== Fourth siege ==
After the Partitions of Poland, Zamość became part of the Austrian Empire, to which it belonged until 1809. During Napoleonic Wars, units of the Duchy of Warsaw, under Prince Jozef Poniatowski, besieged Zamość and managed to capture it. The siege began on May 15, 1809, when units under General Ignacy Kamienski approached the fortress, whose garrison consisted of 3000 soldiers, commanded by Colonel Ferdinand von Pulszky. Two days later, Polish forces were strengthened by additional units under French general Jean Pelletier, who served in the Polish Army. Joined Polish-French forces were aided by local population, also several Austrian recruits were Polish, and during the attack, these soldiers did not engage themselves in the fighting. The attack took place in the night of May 19/20, 1809, from 2 to 4 a.m. The main impact was directed on the Lublin Gate, which surprised the Austrians, as they had been expecting the attack on the weakest, southern wall. The fortress was captured after a few hours. One of participants of the siege, Joanna Zubrowa, became the first woman to receive the Virtuti Militari.

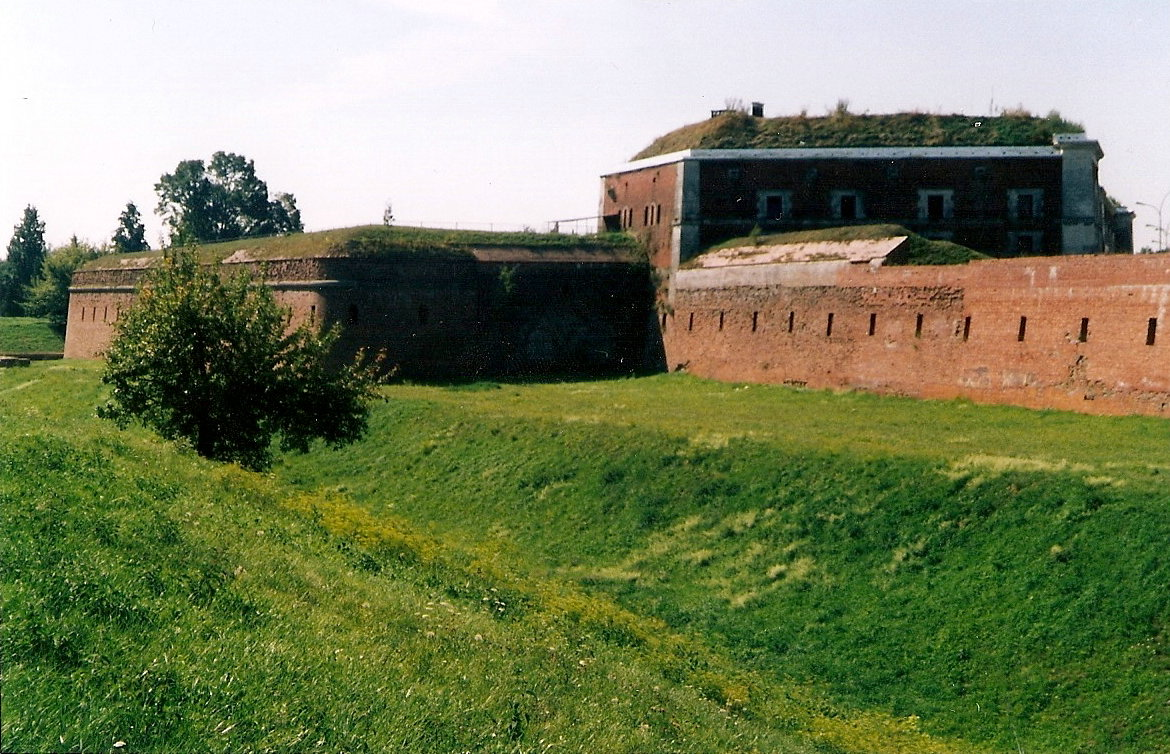
Bastion of the fortress

== Fifth siege ==
After Napoleon's failed invasion on Russia (1812), the fortress was besieged by the Russian forces, which approached Zamość in February 1813. Polish defenders, under General Maurycy Hauke were well-prepared, with 4000 soldiers, 130 cannons and food supplies for four months. The Russians were commanded by General Rath, and their number is estimated at up to 17 000 (as for August 1813), with 160 cannons. After a few weeks of the siege, epidemic of scurvy broke out in the fortress. However, this was managed and the Polish defence of Zamość continued for several months. In mid-June, both sides signed a temporary truce and the Russians limited their summer actions to blocking the fortress. Months of siege depleted the resources and supplies of the defenders. In October 1813, some 1200 soldiers were sick and almost all were starving. All horses, dogs and cats were eaten and the soldiers were given enormous amounts of playing cards to distract them from hunger, within one month, 450 people died. On October 22, news of Napoleon's defeat in the Battle of Leipzig reached Zamość, and it lowered the spirits of the Poles. The decision to capitulate was taken on November 22nd, after nine months of siege. Out of 4000 defenders, 1700 died, mostly of disease and hunger and another 1000 were sick. The fortress became part of Congress Poland.

== Sixth siege ==
During the November Uprising, the fortress was one of main centers of Polish resistance. Commanded by Julian Sierawski and later Jan Krysinski, its garrison consisted of 3800 soldiers. Zamość was a base of Polish units operating in the area of Lublin, however, after Polish defeat in the Battle of Ostrołęka, the Russians took the initiative. The blockade of Zamość began in July 1831, and the fortress itself capitulated on November 21, as the last resistance point of the country.

== Liquidation of the fortress and modern times ==
After the November Uprising, the fortress declined. Technological advance in warfare was decisive and finally, tsar Alexander II of Russia officially closed the stronghold in 1866. In the following years, large parts of fortifications were demolished.

In 1992, Zamość, which is one of the classical monuments of Renaissance urban layout in Europe, was included on the list of the World's Cultural Heritage by UNESCO.
