= Chyża, Lublin Voivodeship =

Chyża
- Village
- Location within Poland
- Coordinates: 50°44′10″N 23°13′32″E
- Country: Poland
- Voivodeship: Lublin
- County: Zamość
- Gmina: Zamość

Chyża [ˈxɨʐa] is a village in the administrative district of Gmina Zamość, within Zamość County, Lublin Voivodeship, in eastern Poland.
