= Wierzchowiny, Zamość County =

Wierzchowiny
- Village
- Location within Poland
- Coordinates: 50°38′N 23°9′E
- Country: Poland
- Voivodeship: Lublin
- County: Zamość
- Gmina: Zamość

Wierzchowiny [vjɛʂxɔˈvinɨ] is a village in the administrative district of Gmina Zamość, within Zamość County, Lublin Voivodeship, in eastern Poland.
