= Sitaniec =

- Village
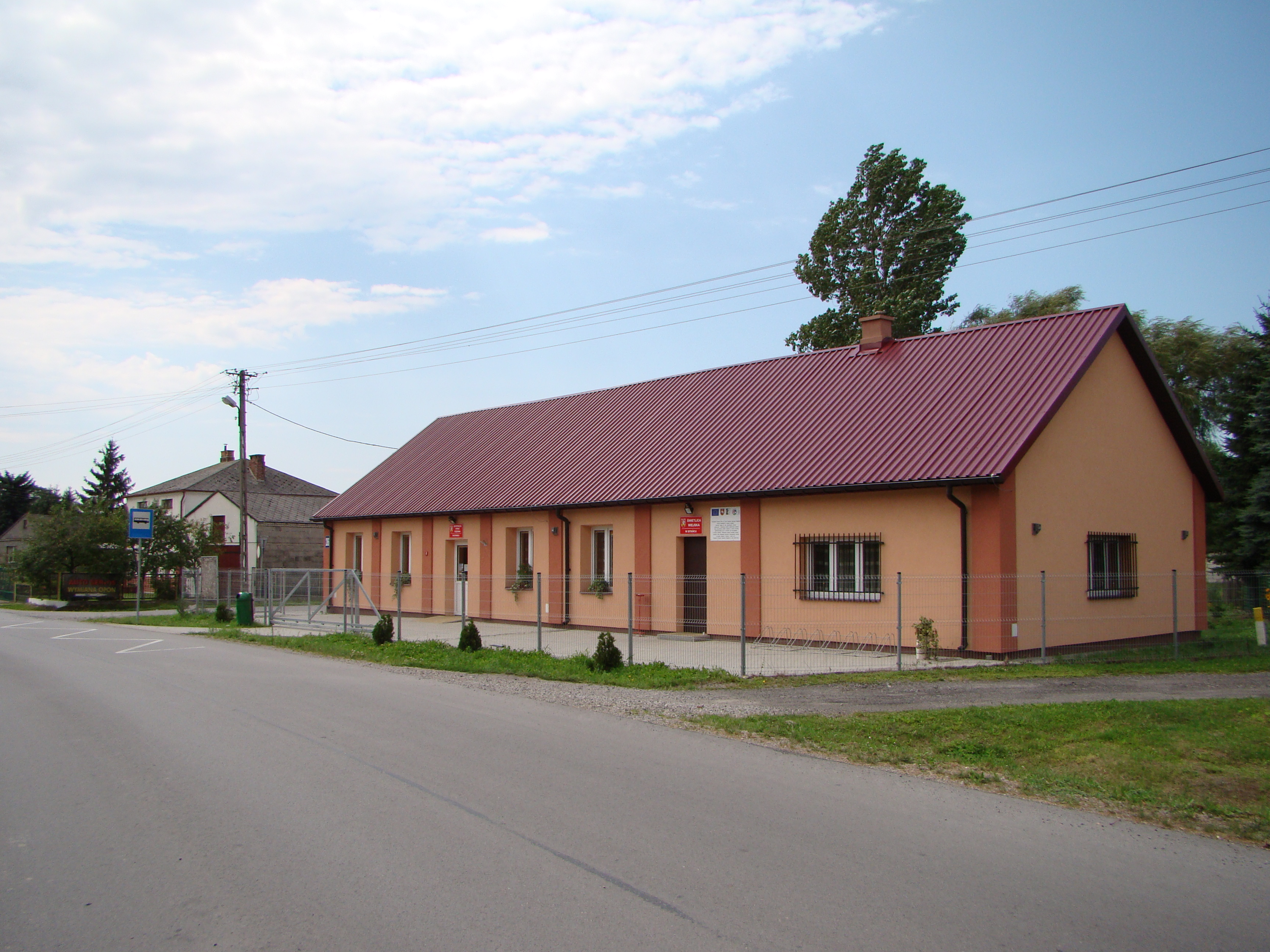
- Volunteer fire department in Sitaniec

- Location within Poland
- Coordinates: 50°45′3″N 23°14′33″E
- Country: Poland
- Voivodeship: Lublin
- County: Zamość
- Gmina: Zamość

Population
  - Total: 1,600
- Time zone: UTC+1 (CET)
  - Summer (DST): UTC+2 (CEST)

Sitaniec [ɕiˈtaɲɛt͡s] is a village in the administrative district of Gmina Zamość, within Zamość County, Lublin Voivodeship, in eastern Poland.

== History ==
17 Polish citizens were murdered by Nazi Germany in the village during World War II.
