= Łapiguz =

- Village
- Location within Poland
- Coordinates: 50°45′45″N 23°16′51″E
- Country: Poland
- Voivodeship: Lublin
- County: Zamość
- Gmina: Zamość

Łapiguz [waˈpiɡus] is a village in the administrative district of Gmina Zamość, within Zamość County, Lublin Voivodeship, in eastern Poland.
