= Hubale =

- Village
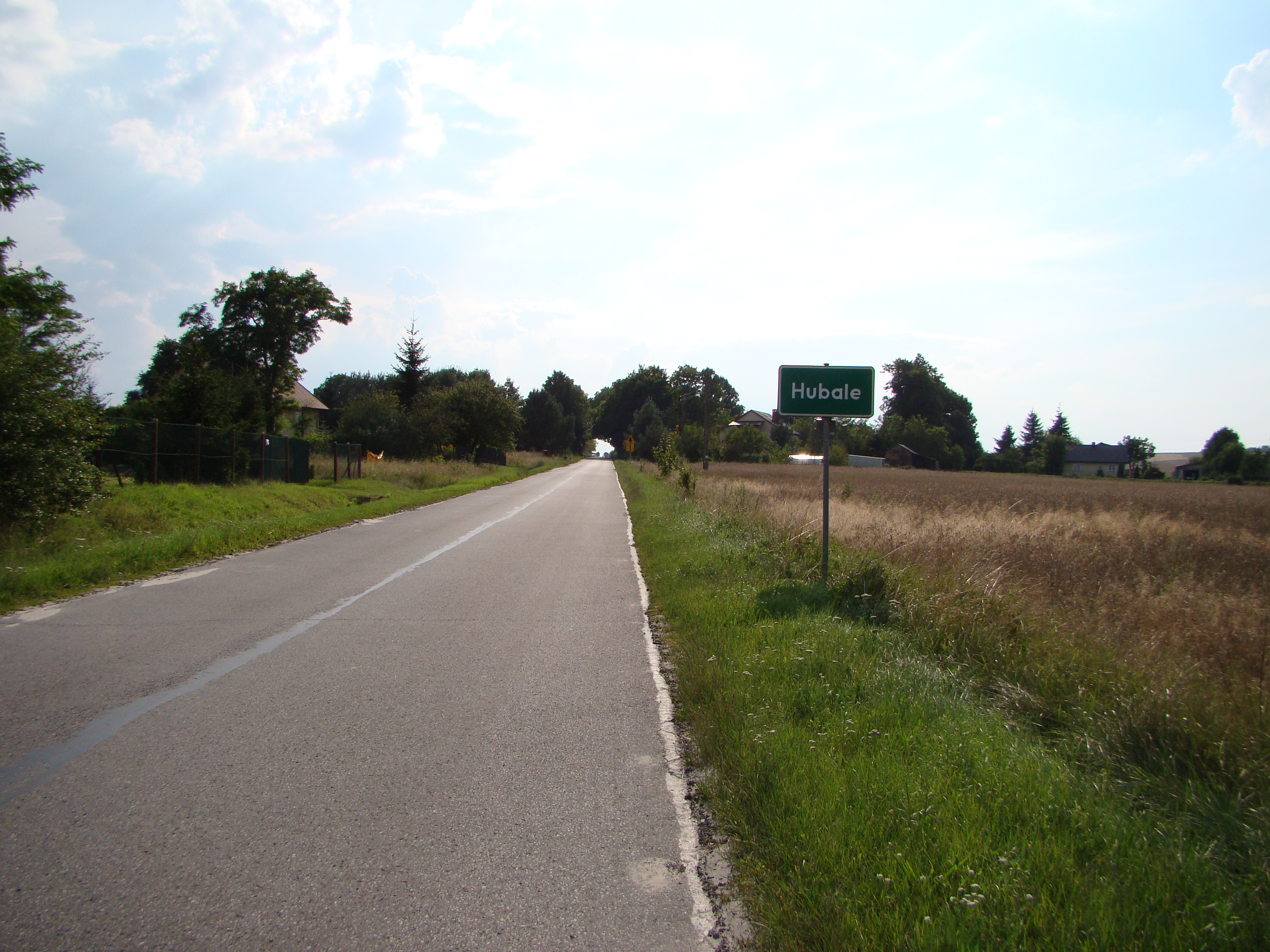
- Road to the village

- Location within Poland
- Coordinates: 50°41′N 23°10′E
- Country: Poland
- Voivodeship: Lublin
- County: Zamość
- Gmina: Zamość

Hubale [xuˈbalɛ] is a village in the administrative district of Gmina Zamość, within Zamość County, Lublin Voivodeship, in eastern Poland.

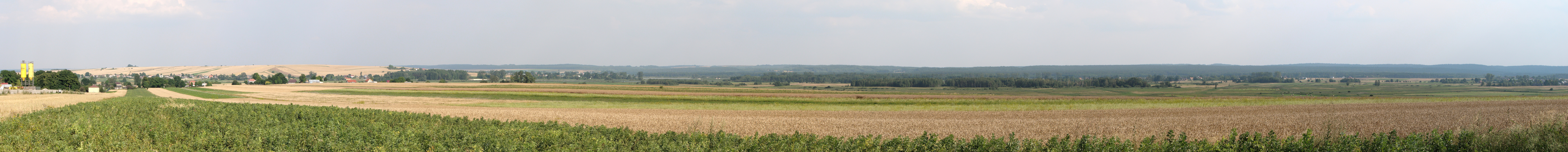
Panorama of Hubale and neighbourhood
