= Jan Mazur =

Polish Roman Catholic bishop

- Bishop of Siedlce
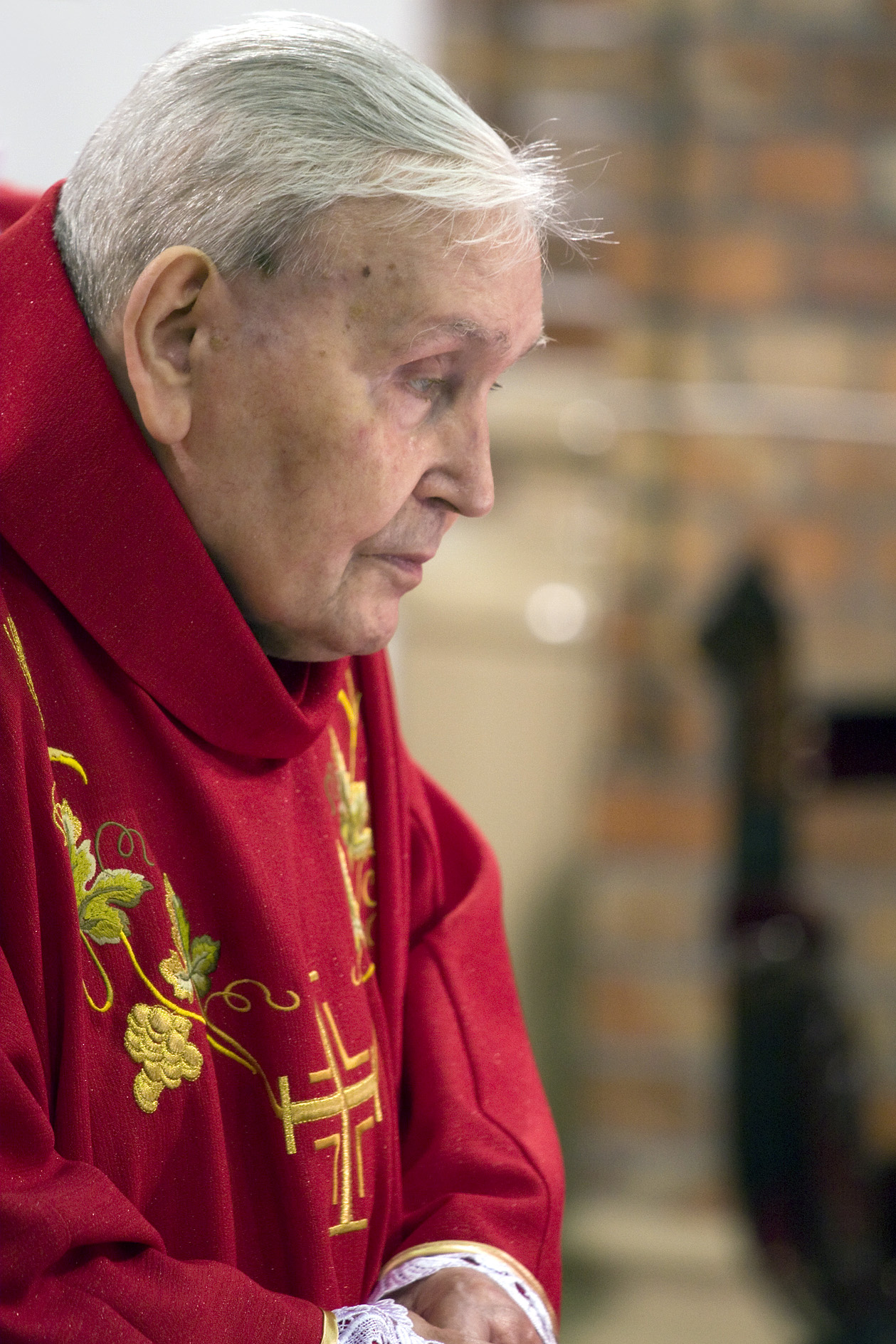
- Appointed: 24 October 1968
- Other posts: Auxiliary Bishop of Lublin (1961 – 1968); Titular Bishop of Bladia (1961 – 1968)

Orders
- Ordination: 26 June 1949 by Zdzisław Goliński
- Consecration: 6 August 1961 by Piotr Kałwa

Personal details
- Born: 5 June 1920 Płoskie
- Died: 26 September 2008 (aged 88) Siedlce
- Education: John Paul II Catholic University of Lublin

Jan Mazur (June 5, 1920 in Płoskie – September 26, 2008 in Siedlce) was the Polish bishop of the Roman Catholic Diocese of Siedlce from August 6, 1968, until his retirement on March 25, 1996. He remained the Bishop Emeritus of Siedlce until his death in 2008 at the age of 88.
