= Wielącza-Kolonia =

- Village
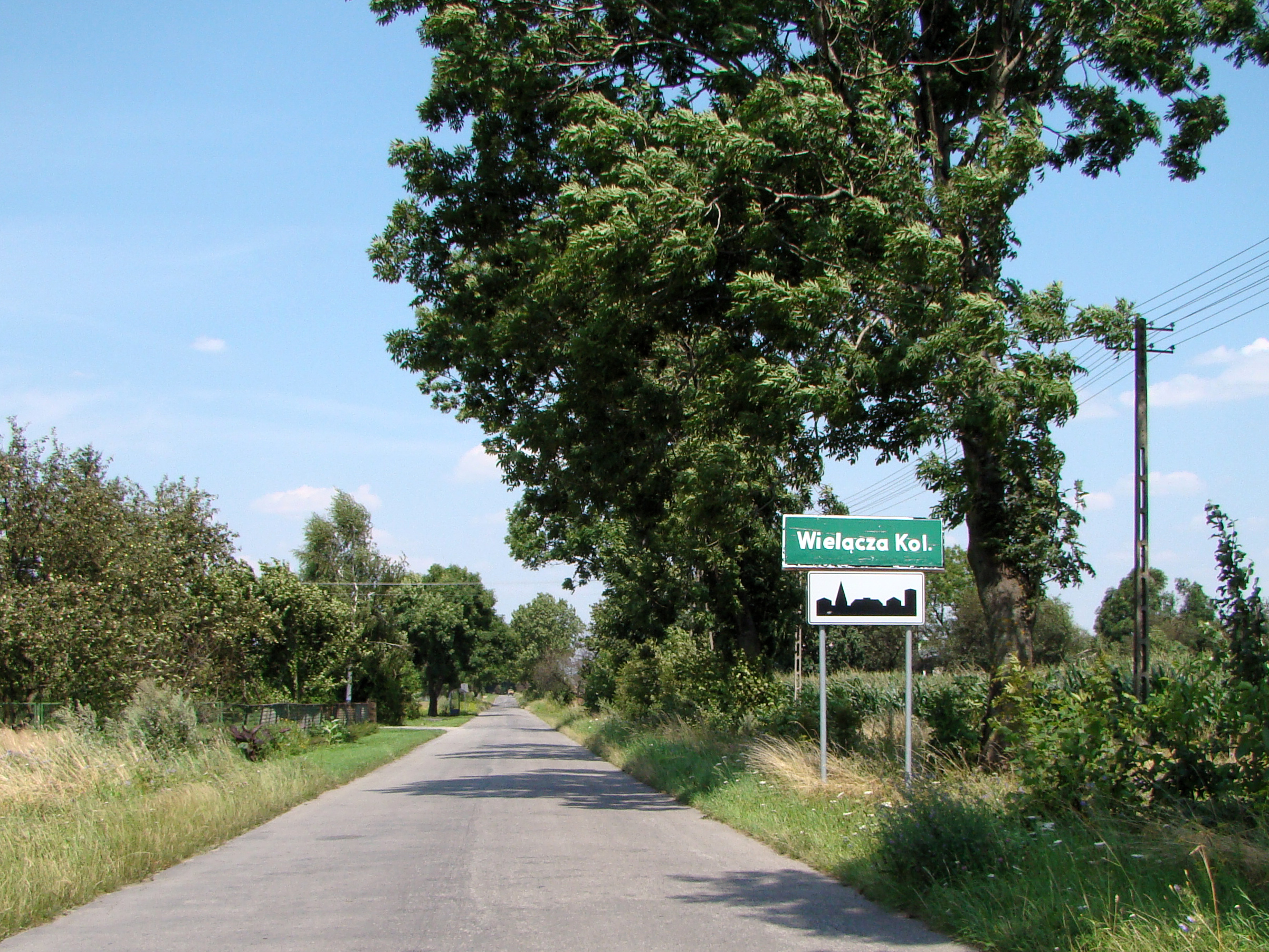

- Location within Poland
- Coordinates: 50°44′20″N 23°04′20″E
- Country: Poland
- Voivodeship: Lublin
- County: Zamość
- Gmina: Szczebrzeszyn

Wielącza-Kolonia [vjɛˈlɔnt͡ʂa kɔˈlɔɲa] is a village in the administrative district of Gmina Szczebrzeszyn, within Zamość County, Lublin Voivodeship, in eastern Poland.
