= Lipowiec-Kolonia =

- Village
- Location within Poland
- Coordinates: 50°40′06″N 23°00′18″E
- Country: Poland
- Voivodeship: Lublin
- County: Zamość
- Gmina: Szczebrzeszyn
- Area: 2.59 km^{2} (1.00 sq mi)
- Population (2011): 14
  - Density: 5.4/km^{2} (14/sq mi)

Lipowiec-Kolonia [liˈpɔvjɛt͡s kɔˈlɔɲa] is a village in the administrative district of Gmina Szczebrzeszyn, within Zamość County, Lublin Voivodeship, in eastern Poland. Its population was 14 in 2011.
