= Zarzecze, Zamość County =

Zarzecze
- Village
- Location within Poland
- Coordinates: 50°39′8″N 23°10′11″E
- Country: Poland
- Voivodeship: Lublin
- County: Zamość
- Gmina: Zamość

Zarzecze [zaˈʐɛt͡ʂɛ] is a village in the administrative district of Gmina Zamość, within Zamość County, Lublin Voivodeship, in eastern Poland.
