= Bortatycze-Kolonia =

- Village
- Location within Poland
- Coordinates: 50°45′5″N 23°10′58″E
- Country: Poland
- Voivodeship: Lublin
- County: Zamość
- Gmina: Zamość
- Population: 280

Bortatycze-Kolonia [bɔrtaˈtɨt͡ʂɛ kɔˈlɔɲa] is a village in the administrative district of Gmina Zamość, within Zamość County, Lublin Voivodeship, in eastern Poland.
