= Kawęczynek, Lublin Voivodeship =

Kawęczynek
- Village
- Location within Poland
- Coordinates: 50°40′N 22°55′E
- Country: Poland
- Voivodeship: Lublin
- County: Zamość
- Gmina: Szczebrzeszyn
- Elevation: 332 m (1,089 ft)
- Time zone: UTC+1 (CET)
  - Summer (DST): UTC+2 (CEST)

Kawęczynek [kavɛnˈt͡ʂɨnɛk] is a village in the administrative district of Gmina Szczebrzeszyn, within Zamość County, Lublin Voivodeship, in eastern Poland.

== History ==
Five Polish citizens were murdered by Nazi Germany in the village during World War II.
