= Sitaniec-Wolica =

- Village
- Location within Poland
- Coordinates: 50°45′42″N 23°13′4″E
- Country: Poland
- Voivodeship: Lublin
- County: Zamość
- Gmina: Zamość

Sitaniec-Wolica [ɕiˈtaɲɛt͡s vɔˈlit͡sa] is a village in the administrative district of Gmina Zamość, within Zamość County, Lublin Voivodeship, in eastern Poland.
