= Jatutów =

- Village
- Location within Poland
- Coordinates: 50°41′33″N 23°19′6″E
- Country: Poland
- Voivodeship: Lublin
- County: Zamość
- Gmina: Zamość

Jatutów [jaˈtutuf] is a village in the administrative district of Gmina Zamość, within Zamość County, Lublin Voivodeship, in eastern Poland.
