= Wólka Panieńska =

- Village
- Location within Poland
- Coordinates: 50°40′54″N 23°17′47″E
- Country: Poland
- Voivodeship: Lublin
- County: Zamość
- Gmina: Zamość

Wólka Panieńska [ˈvulka paˈɲɛɲska] is a village in the administrative district of Gmina Zamość, within Zamość County, Lublin Voivodeship, in eastern Poland.
