= Lipsko-Kosobudy =

- Village
- Location within Poland
- Coordinates: 50°39′3″N 23°13′50″E
- Country: Poland
- Voivodeship: Lublin
- County: Zamość
- Gmina: Zamość

Lipsko-Kosobudy [ˈlipskɔ kɔsɔˈbudɨ] is a village in the administrative district of Gmina Zamość, within Zamość County, Lublin Voivodeship, in eastern Poland.
