= Wielącza =

- Village
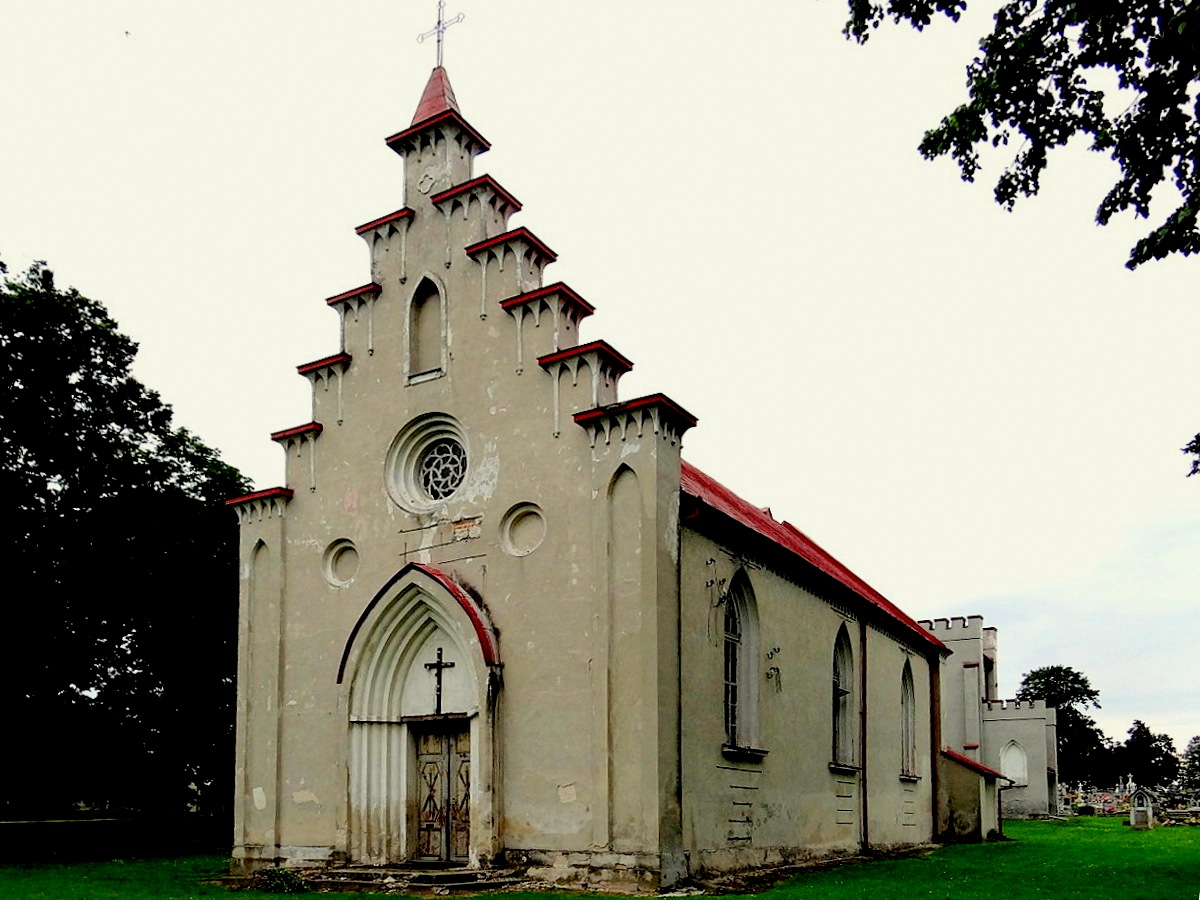
- Saint Stanislaus church in Wielącza

- Location within Poland
- Coordinates: 50°44′N 23°6′E
- Country: Poland
- Voivodeship: Lublin
- County: Zamość
- Gmina: Szczebrzeszyn
- Time zone: UTC+1 (CET)
  - Summer (DST): UTC+2 (CEST)
- Vehicle registration: LZA

Wielącza [vjɛˈlɔnt͡ʂa] is a village in the administrative district of Gmina Szczebrzeszyn, within Zamość County, Lublin Voivodeship, in eastern Poland.

== History ==
In 1921, the village had a population of 1,654, 98.9% Polish by nationality.

During the German occupation of Poland in World War II, on 5 and 15 December 1942, the SS, Sonderdienst, German gendarmerie and Ukrainian auxiliaries carried out expulsions of Poles, during which some 172 Poles were murdered, including 27 children.
