= Pniówek, Lublin Voivodeship =

Village in Lublin Voivodeship, Poland

Pniówek
- Village
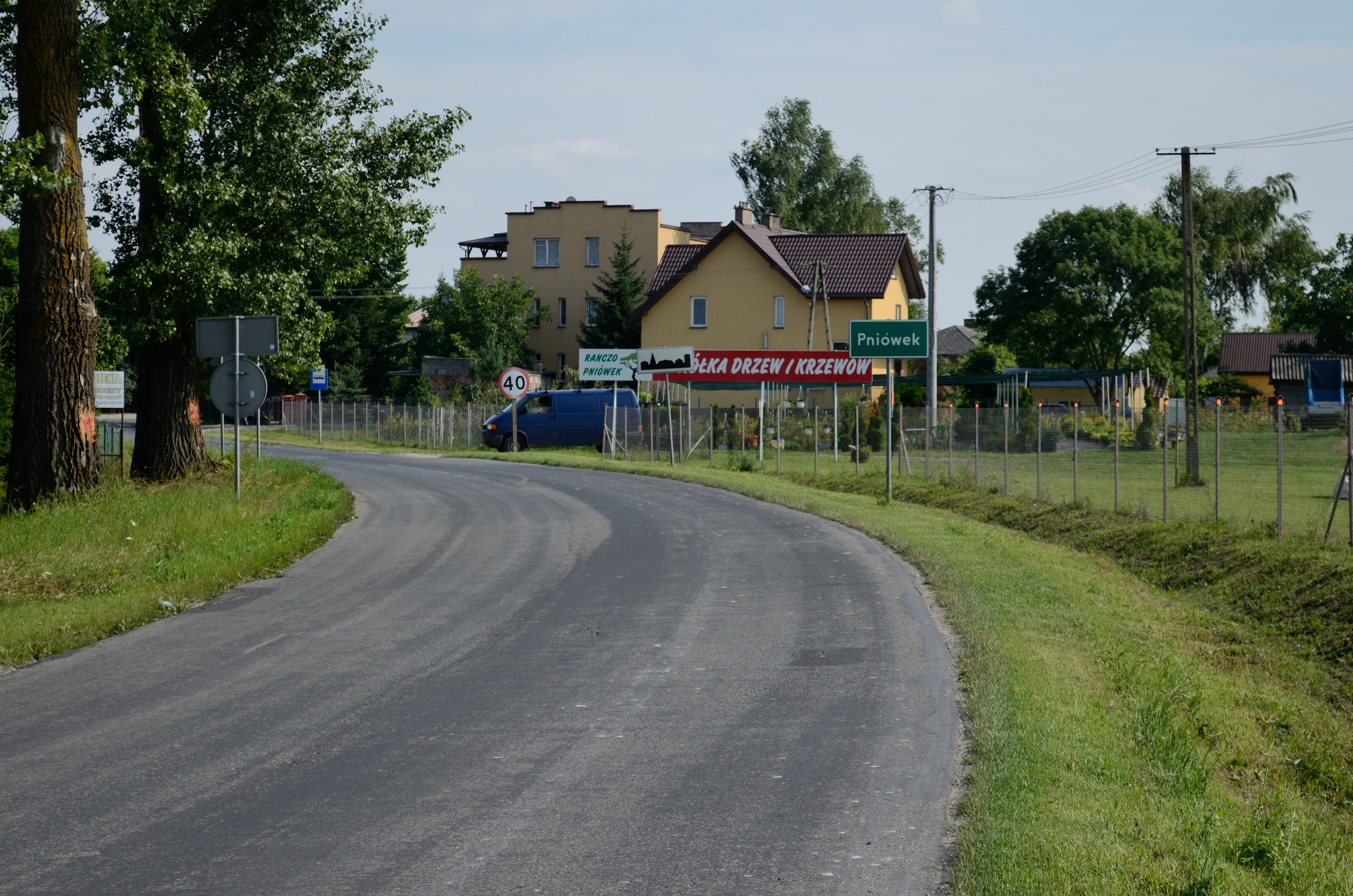
- Road through the village

- Location within Poland
- Coordinates: 50°40′34″N 23°17′53″E
- Country: Poland
- Voivodeship: Lublin
- County: Zamość
- Gmina: Zamość

Pniówek [ˈpɲuvɛk] is a village in the administrative district of Gmina Zamość, within Zamość County, Lublin Voivodeship, in eastern Poland.
