= Brody Duże, Lublin Voivodeship =

Brody Duże
- Village
- Location within Poland
- Coordinates: 50°42′N 23°0′E
- Country: Poland
- Voivodeship: Lublin
- County: Zamość
- Gmina: Szczebrzeszyn

Brody Duże [ˈbrɔdɨ ˈduʐɛ] is a village in the administrative district of Gmina Szczebrzeszyn, within Zamość County, Lublin Voivodeship, in eastern Poland.
