= Wielącza Poduchowna =

- Village
- Location within Poland
- Coordinates: 50°44′35″N 23°05′36″E
- Country: Poland
- Voivodeship: Lublin
- County: Zamość
- Gmina: Szczebrzeszyn

Wielącza Poduchowna [vjɛˈlɔnt͡ʂa pɔduˈxɔvna] is a village in the administrative district of Gmina Szczebrzeszyn, within Zamość County, Lublin Voivodeship, in eastern Poland.
