= Bodaczów =

- Village
- Location within Poland
- Coordinates: 50°43′N 23°3′E
- Country: Poland
- Voivodeship: Lublin
- County: Zamość
- Gmina: Szczebrzeszyn
- Population: 2,300

Bodaczów [bɔˈdat͡ʂuf] is a village in the administrative district of Gmina Szczebrzeszyn, within Zamość County, Lublin Voivodeship, in eastern Poland.
