= Niedzieliska, Lublin Voivodeship =

Niedzieliska
- Village
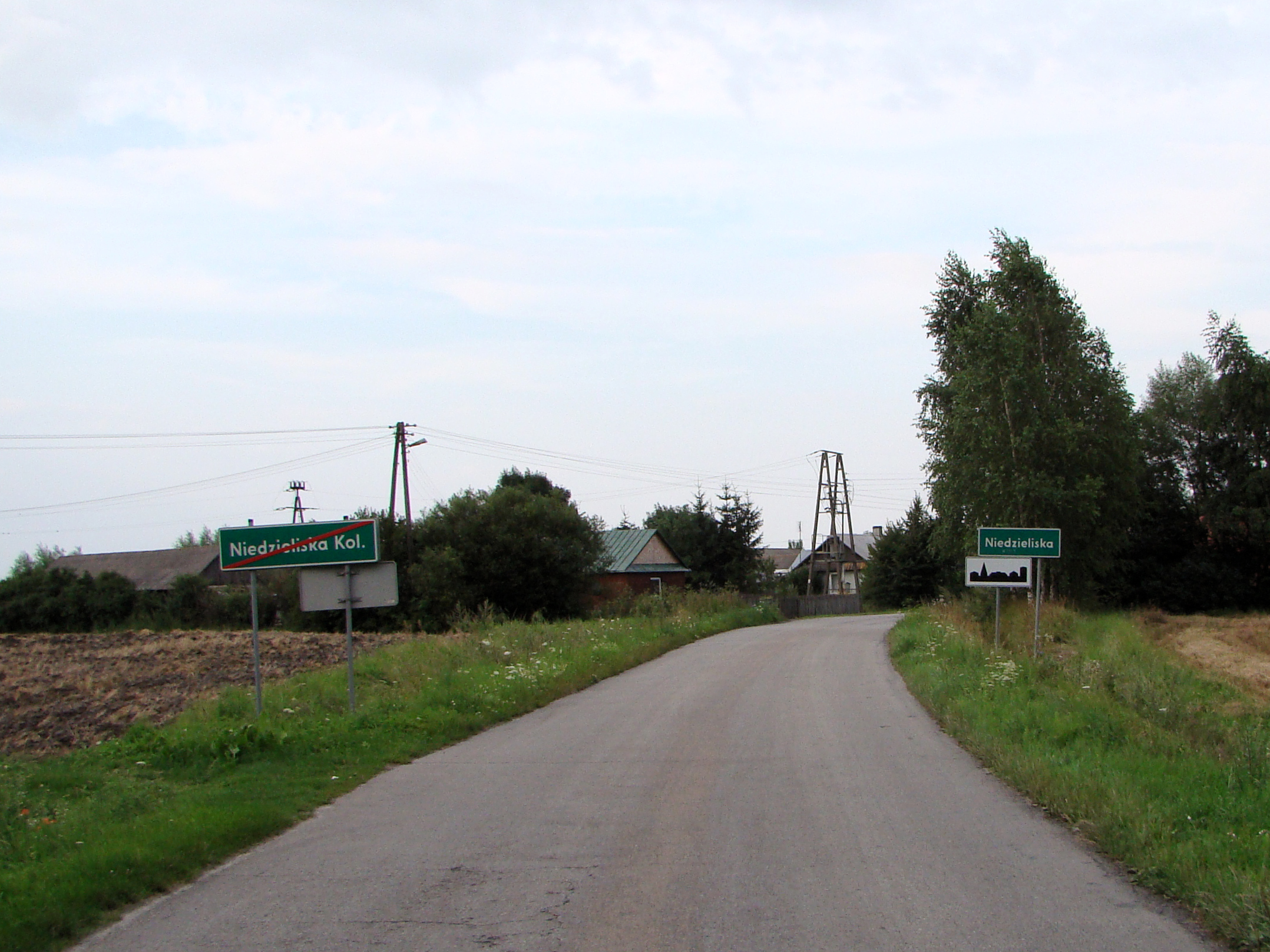
- Road through the village

- Location within Poland
- Coordinates: 50°43′N 23°6′E
- Country: Poland
- Voivodeship: Lublin
- County: Zamość
- Gmina: Szczebrzeszyn

Niedzieliska [ɲɛd͡ʑɛˈliska] is a village in the administrative district of Gmina Szczebrzeszyn, within Zamość County, Lublin Voivodeship, in eastern Poland.

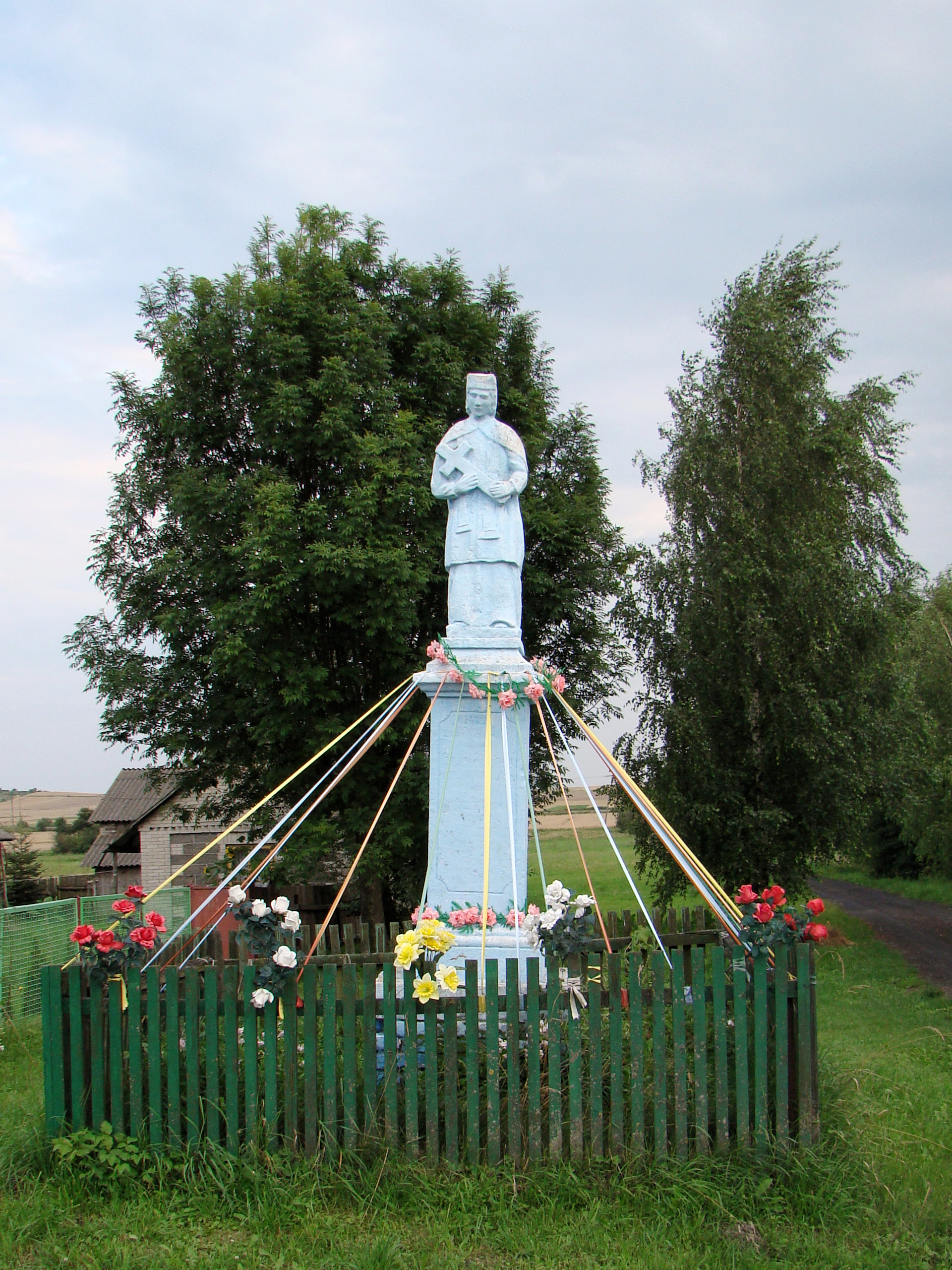
Jan Nepomucen figurine
