= Sułów, Lublin Voivodeship =

Sułów
- Village
- Location within Poland
- Coordinates: 50°46′0″N 22°57′15″E
- Country: Poland
- Voivodeship: Lublin
- County: Zamość
- Gmina: Sułów
- Population: 460

Sułów [ˈsuwuf] is a village in Zamość County, Lublin Voivodeship, in eastern Poland. It is the seat of the gmina (administrative district) called Gmina Sułów.
