= Żdanów, Lublin Voivodeship =

Żdanów
- Village
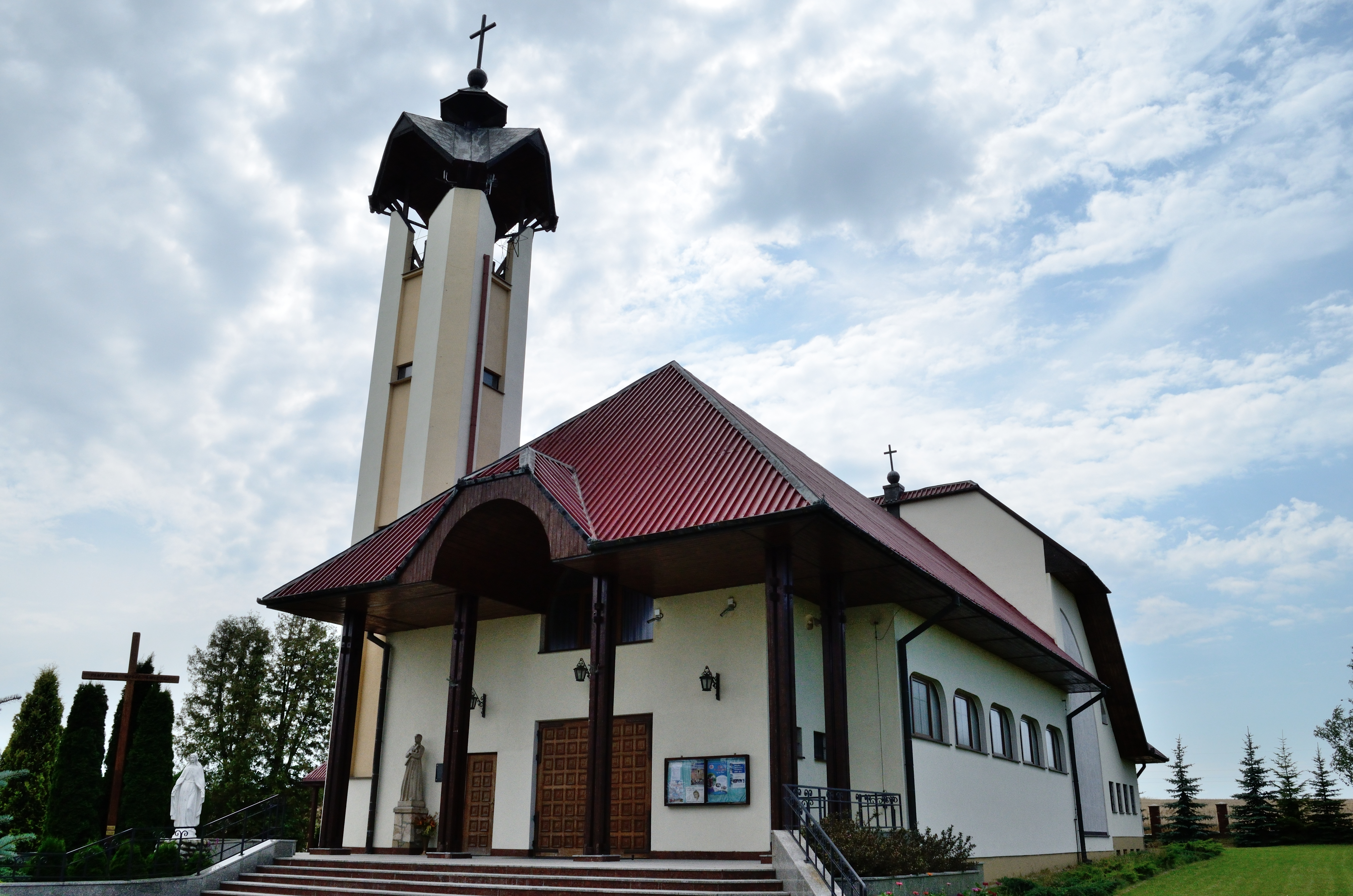
- Church in Żdanów

- Location within Poland
- Coordinates: 50°41′17″N 23°13′17″E
- Country: Poland
- Voivodeship: Lublin
- County: Zamość
- Gmina: Zamość

Żdanów ([ˈʐdanuf]) is a village in the administrative district of Gmina Zamość, within Zamość County, Lublin Voivodeship, in eastern Poland.
