= Płoskie, Lublin Voivodeship =

Płoskie
- Village
- Location within Poland
- Coordinates: 50°42′29″N 23°11′10″E
- Country: Poland
- Voivodeship: Lublin
- County: Zamość
- Gmina: Zamość

Płoskie [ˈpwɔskʲɛ] is a village in the administrative district of Gmina Zamość, within Zamość County, Lublin Voivodeship, in eastern Poland.
