= Lipsko, Lublin Voivodeship =

Lipsko
- Village
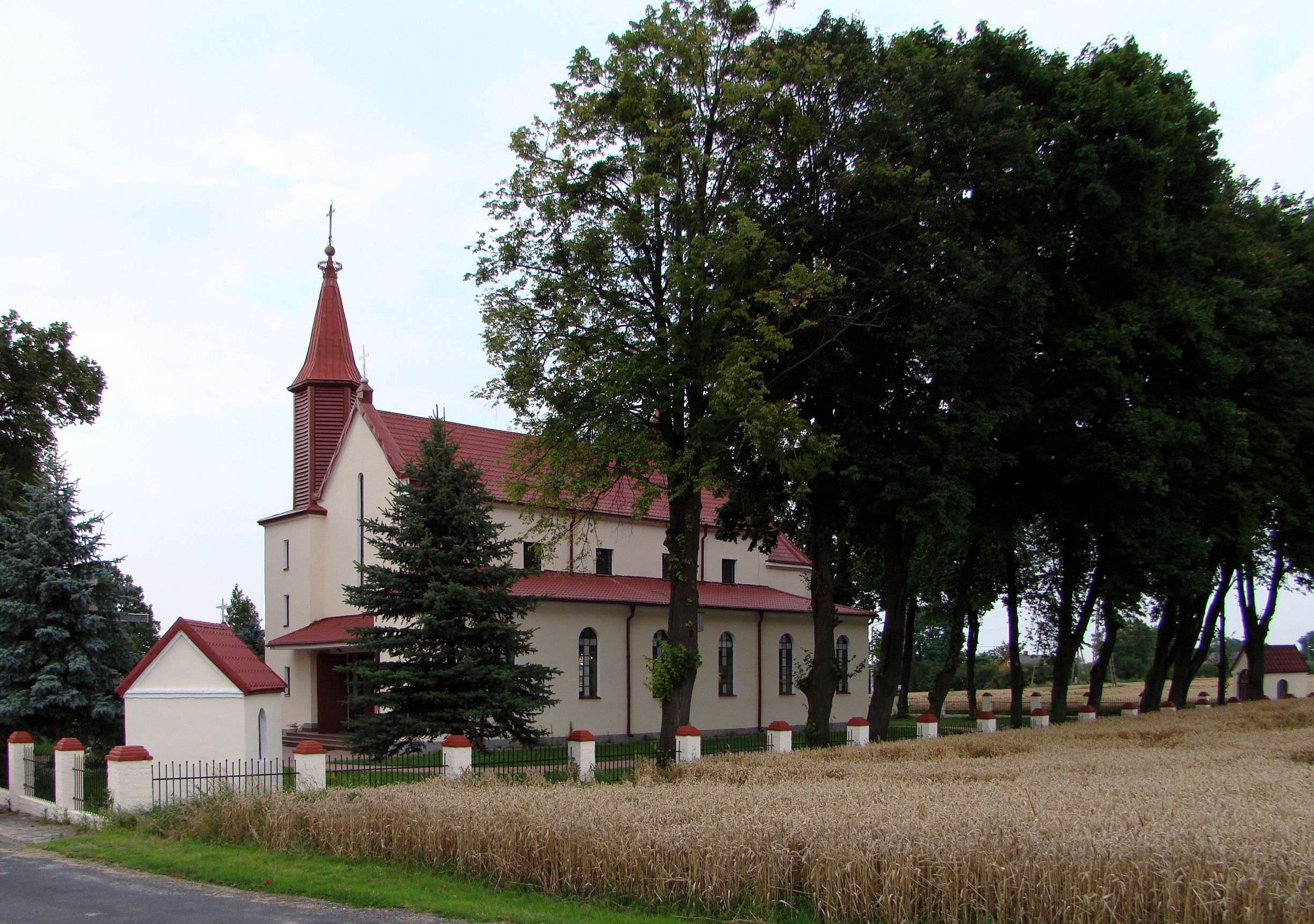
- Saint John the Baptist Church in Lipsko

- Location within Poland
- Coordinates: 50°39′29″N 23°14′0″E
- Country: Poland
- Voivodeship: Lublin
- County: Zamość
- Gmina: Zamość
- Time zone: UTC+1 (CET)
  - Summer (DST): UTC+2 (CEST)
- Vehicle registration: LZA

Lipsko [ˈlipskɔ] is a village in the administrative district of Gmina Zamość, within Zamość County, Lublin Voivodeship, in southeastern Poland.
