= Niedzieliska-Kolonia =

- Village
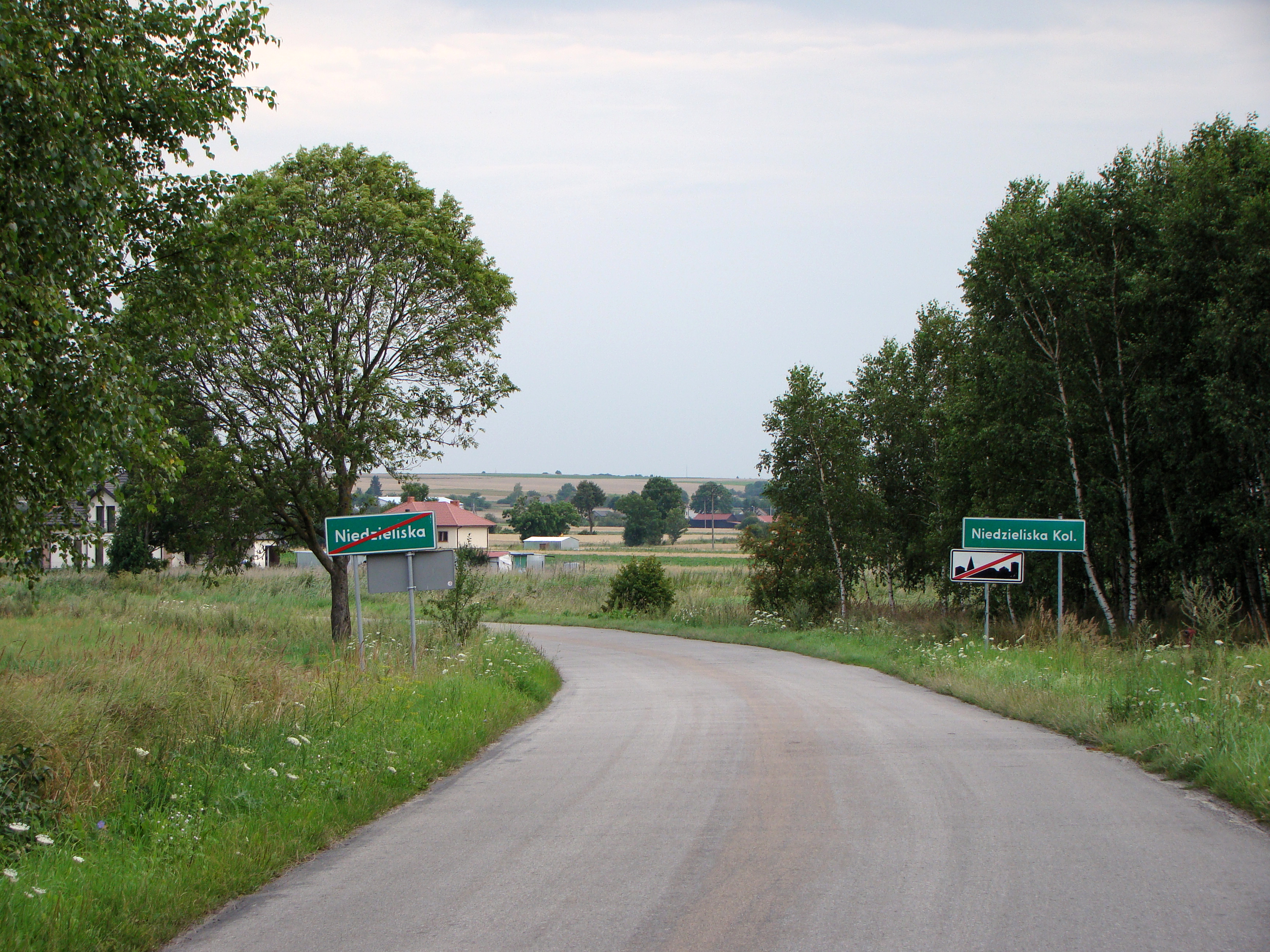
- Road through the village

- Location within Poland
- Coordinates: 50°41′35″N 23°04′14″E
- Country: Poland
- Voivodeship: Lublin
- County: Zamość
- Gmina: Szczebrzeszyn
- Time zone: UTC+1 (CET)
  - Summer (DST): UTC+2 (CEST)

Niedzieliska-Kolonia [ɲɛd͡ʑɛˈliska kɔˈlɔɲa] is a village in the administrative district of Gmina Szczebrzeszyn, within Zamość County, Lublin Voivodeship, in eastern Poland.

== History ==
16 Polish citizens were murdered by Nazi Germany in the village during World War II.
