= Gmina Szczebrzeszyn =

Gmina Szczebrzeszyn Szczebrzeszyn Commune
- Gmina
- Coat of arms
- Interactive map of Gmina Szczebrzeszyn
- Coordinates (Szczebrzeszyn): 50°41′N 22°58′E
- Country: Poland
- Voivodeship: Lublin
- County: Zamość County
- Seat: Szczebrzeszyn

Area
  - Total: 123.16 km^{2} (47.55 sq mi)

Population (2013)
  - Total: 11,686
  - Density: 94.885/km^{2} (245.75/sq mi)
  - Urban: 5,245
  - Rural: 6,441
- Website: http://www.szczebrzeszyn.pl

Gmina Szczebrzeszyn is an urban-rural gmina (administrative district) in Zamość County, Lublin Voivodeship, in eastern Poland. Its seat is the town of Szczebrzeszyn, which lies approximately 21 kilometres (13 mi) west of Zamość and 69 km (43 mi) south-east of the regional capital Lublin.

The gmina covers an area of 123.16 square kilometres (47.6 sq mi), and as of 2006 its total population is 12,040 (out of which the population of Szczebrzeszyn amounts to 5,299, and the population of the rural part of the gmina is 6,741).

== Villages ==
Apart from the town of Szczebrzeszyn, Gmina Szczebrzeszyn contains the villages and settlements of Bodaczów, Brody Duże, Brody Małe, Kąty Drugie, Kąty Pierwsze, Kawęczyn, Kawęczynek, Lipowiec-Kolonia, Niedzieliska, Niedzieliska-Kolonia, Wielącza, Wielącza Poduchowna and Wielącza-Kolonia.

== Neighbouring gminas ==
Gmina Szczebrzeszyn is bordered by the gminas of Nielisz, Radecznica, Sułów, Zamość and Zwierzyniec.
