= Gmina Sułów =

Gmina Sułów Sułów Commune
- Gmina
- Interactive map of Gmina Sułów
- Coordinates (Sułów): 50°46′0″N 22°57′15″E
- Country: Poland
- Voivodeship: Lublin
- County: Zamość County
- Seat: Sułów

Area
  - Total: 93.48 km^{2} (36.09 sq mi)

Population (2013)
  - Total: 4,765
  - Density: 50.97/km^{2} (132.0/sq mi)
- Website: http://www.sulow.pl

Gmina Sułów is a rural gmina (administrative district) in Zamość County, Lublin Voivodeship, in eastern Poland. Its seat is the village of Sułów, which lies approximately 23 kilometres (14 mi) west of Zamość and 60 km (37 mi) south-east of the regional capital Lublin.

The gmina covers an area of 93.48 square kilometres (36.1 sq mi), and as of 2006 its total population is 5,129 (4,765 in 2013).

== Villages ==
Gmina Sułów contains the villages and settlements of Deszkowice Drugie, Deszkowice Pierwsze, Kawęczyn-Kolonia, Kitów, Michalów, Rozłopy, Rozłopy-Kolonia, Sąsiadka, Sułów, Sułów-Kolonia, Sułówek, Sułowiec, Tworyczów and Źrebce, as well as Brzezina, Czajki, Czternastka, Doliny, Gaj, Góry, Kolonia, Kolonia Dworska, Kolonia Środkowa, Kątek, Lipiny, Majdan, Mule, Nawsie, Pałac, Pod Szosą, Polówka, Popówka, Rutki, Rynek, Stara Wieś, Starowieś, and Wygon.

== Neighbouring gminas ==
Gmina Sułów is bordered by the gminas of Nielisz, Radecznica, Rudnik, Szczebrzeszyn and Turobin.
