= Topornica =

- Village
- Location within Poland
- Coordinates: 50°39′46″N 23°11′52″E
- Country: Poland
- Voivodeship: Lublin
- County: Zamość
- Gmina: Zamość

Topornica [tɔpɔrˈnit͡sa] is a village in the administrative district of Gmina Zamość, within Zamość County, Lublin Voivodeship, in eastern Poland.
