= Gmina Zamość =

Gmina Zamość Zamość Commune
- Gmina
- Flag Coat of arms
- Interactive map of Gmina Zamość
- Coordinates (Zamość): 50°43′14″N 23°15′31″E
- Country: Poland
- Voivodeship: Lublin
- County: Zamość County
- Seat: Zamość

Area
  - Total: 197 km^{2} (76 sq mi)

Population (2013)
  - Total: 22,305
  - Density: 113/km^{2} (293/sq mi)
- Website: http://www.zamosc.pl/gmina

Gmina Zamość is a rural gmina (administrative district) in Zamość County, Lublin Voivodeship, in eastern Poland. Its seat is the town of Zamość, although the town is not part of the territory of the gmina.

The gmina covers an area of 197 square kilometres (76.1 sq mi), and as of 2006 its total population is 20,482 (22,305 in 2013).

== Villages ==
Gmina Zamość contains the villages and settlements of Białobrzegi, Białowola, Borowina Sitaniecka, Bortatycze, Bortatycze-Kolonia, Chyża, Hubale, Jatutów, Kalinowice, Łapiguz, Lipsko, Lipsko-Kosobudy, Lipsko-Polesie, Majdanek, Mokre, Płoskie, Pniówek, Siedliska, Sitaniec, Sitaniec-Kolonia, Sitaniec-Wolica, Skaraszów, Skokówka, Szopinek, Topornica, Wieprzec, Wierzchowiny, Wólka Panieńska, Wólka Wieprzecka, Wychody, Wysokie, Zagóra, Zalesie, Zarzecze, Zawada, Żdanów, Żdanówek and Zwódne.

== Neighbouring gminas ==
Gmina Zamość is bordered by the city of Zamość and by the gminas of Adamów, Łabunie, Nielisz, Sitno, Skierbieszów, Stary Zamość, Szczebrzeszyn and Zwierzyniec.
