= Zamość County =

Zamość County Powiat zamojski
- County
- Flag Coat of arms

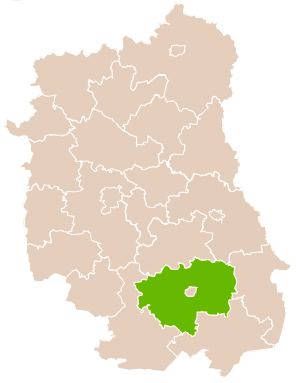
- Location within the voivodeship
- Coordinates (Zamość): 50°43′14″N 23°15′31″E
- Country: Poland
- Voivodeship: Lublin
- Seat: Zamość
- Gminas: Total 15: Gmina Adamów; Gmina Grabowiec; Gmina Komarów-Osada; Gmina Krasnobród; Gmina Łabunie; Gmina Miączyn; Gmina Nielisz; Gmina Radecznica; Gmina Sitno; Gmina Skierbieszów; Gmina Stary Zamość; Gmina Sułów; Gmina Szczebrzeszyn; Gmina Zamość; Gmina Zwierzyniec

Area
  - Total: 1,872.27 km^{2} (722.89 sq mi)

Population (2019)
  - Total: 107,441
  - Density: 57.3854/km^{2} (148.628/sq mi)
  - Urban: 11,257
  - Rural: 96,184
- Car plates: LZA
- Website: www.starostwo.zamosc.pl

Zamość County (Polish: powiat zamojski) is a unit of territorial administration and local government (powiat) in Lublin Voivodeship, eastern Poland. It was established on January 1, 1999, as a result of the Polish local government reforms passed in 1998. Its administrative seat is the city of Zamość, although the city is not part of the county (it constitutes a separate city county). The county contains three towns: Szczebrzeszyn, which lies 21 km (13 mi) west of Zamość, Zwierzyniec, which lies 24 km (15 mi) south-west of Zamość, and Krasnobród, 22 km (14 mi) south of Zamość.

The county covers an area of 1,872.27 square kilometres (722.9 sq mi). As of 2019, its total population is 107,441, including a population of 4,991 in Szczebrzeszyn, 3,175 in Zwierzyniec, 3,091 in Krasnobród, and a rural population of 96,184.

== Neighbouring counties ==
Apart from the city of Zamość, Zamość County is also bordered by Krasnystaw County and Chełm County to the north, Hrubieszów County to the east, Tomaszów County to the south, and Biłgoraj County to the west.

== Administrative divisions ==
The county is subdivided into 15 gminas (three urban-rural and 12 rural). These are listed in the following table, in descending order of population.

Gmina	Type	Area (km^{2})	Population (2019)	Seat
Gmina Zamość	rural	197.0	23,166	Zamość (Note: seat not part of the gmina)
Gmina Szczebrzeszyn	urban-rural	123.2	11,177	Szczebrzeszyn
Gmina Krasnobród	urban-rural	124.9	7,089	Krasnobród
Gmina Sitno	rural	112.1	6,766	Sitno
Gmina Zwierzyniec	urban-rural	156.8	6,740	Zwierzyniec
Gmina Łabunie	rural	87.5	6,209	Łabunie
Gmina Miączyn	rural	155.9	5,787	Miączyn
Gmina Radecznica	rural	109.8	5,673	Radecznica
Gmina Adamów	rural	110.6	5,594	Adamów
Gmina Nielisz	rural	113.2	5,455	Nielisz
Gmina Stary Zamość	rural	97.2	5,203	Stary Zamość
Gmina Skierbieszów	rural	139.2	5,132	Skierbieszów
Gmina Komarów-Osada	rural	122.8	4,968	Komarów-Osada
Gmina Sułów	rural	93.5	4,494	Sułów
Gmina Grabowiec	rural	128.9	3,988	Grabowiec
