= Stanisław Kostka Starowieyski =

Polish officer, social activist, blessed (1895–1941)

Blessed Stanisław Kostka Starowieyski
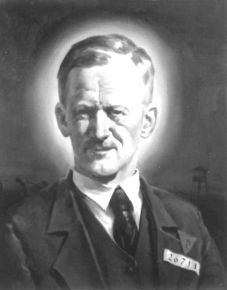
- Stanisław Kostka Starowieyski
- Born: Stanisław Kostka (Biberstein) Starowieyski; 11 May 1895; Ustrobna, Austria-Hungary
- Hometown: Bratkówka
- Died: 13 April 1941 (aged 45); Dachau concentration camp, Nazi Germany
- Cause of death: Murder
- Beatified: June 13, 1999, Warsaw by Pope John Paul II

Stanisław Kostka Starowieyski (1895-1941) is Polish Blessed of the Catholic Church, who was a church, social, and charitable activist, as well as and a papal chamberlain. He served in the Austro-Hungarian Army during World War I and then served in the Polish Armed Forces during the Polish–Ukrainian and Polish–Soviet Wars from 1918 to 1920. He died in Dachau concentration camp, and was beatified in 1999.

== Biography ==
=== Youth ===
Stanisław Kostka Maria Gerard Franciszek de Hieronymo Biberstein Starowieyski was born on 11 May 1895, in Ustrobna, as the third child of Stanisław Jan and Amelia née Łubieńska. His father was a member of the Diet of Galicia and Lodomeria, the Imperial Council, and the Legislative Sejm (1919–1922), and owned estates in Bratkówka and Korabniki. The family was of noble origin, related to the Bibersteins.

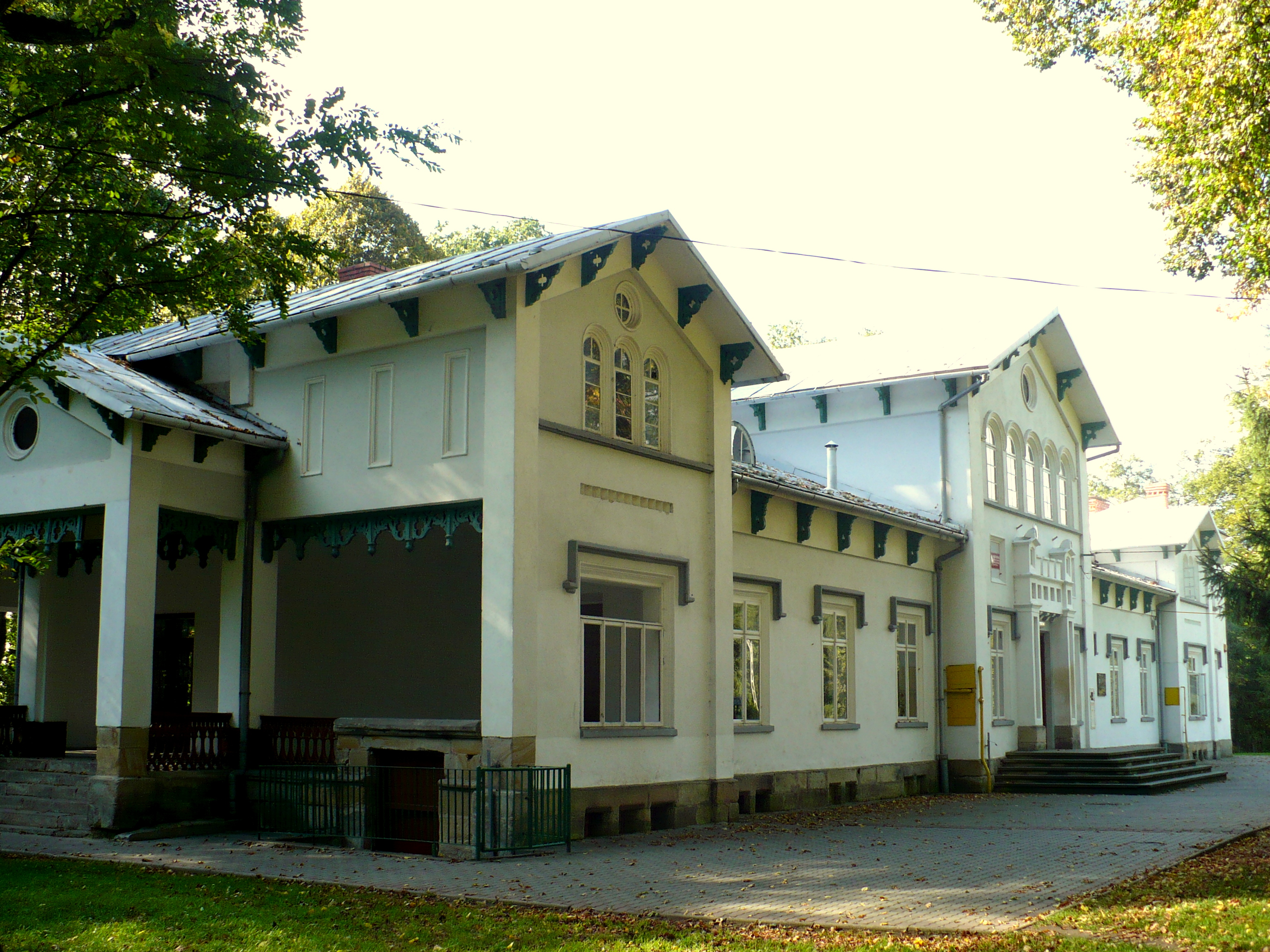
Former Starowieyski's manor in Bratkówka

Stanisław spent his early childhood at the domestic estate of Bratkówka. The Starowieyskis were strongly attached to the Catholic Church and led many social activities in the Catholic community, following reforms launched at the time by Pope Pius X. Like his siblings, Stanisław was tutored at home in Krosno. Later, residing in Bratkówka, Stanisław studied in Sanok at the C.K. Gimnazjum (Imperial and Royal Gymnasium), today known as Primary School No. 8 Sophia of Halshany, where he completed Grades 1-3 from 1905 to 1908.

In 1910, Stanisław moved to the Jesuit College in Khyriv. In 1914 he finished 8th grade and passed his final exam. At this institution, he joined the Roman Catholic society Sodality of Our Lady.

After graduating high school, Starowieyski began studying law at the Faculty of Law and Administration of the Jagiellonian University in Kraków. His studies were interrupted by the outbreak of World War I.

On 15 September 1914, Starowieyski was mobilized into the Austro-Hungarian Army and sent to officer training. After graduating on 28 June 1915, he moved to a field artillery regiment on the Eastern Front in Russia, where he fought at Lwów and Przemyśl. On March 3, 1918, he was transferred to the Italian front, where he fought in the Battle of the Piave River.

=== Interwar period ===
Stanisław returned to a reborn Poland on 1 November 1918, and joined the Army. As a second lieutenant, he participated in the Polish Army build-up in Kraków. He took part in the Polish-Ukrainian War as a battery commander: he fought near Przemyśl and at the Lwów Citadel during the defense of the city.

In June 1919, Starowieyski contributed to the formation of the 9th Light Artillery Regiment in Rembertów. As a lieutenant in this unit, he took part in the Polish-Soviet War (including the Kiev offensive (1920) and the Battle of Warsaw (1920)) from December 1919 to August 1920. For his acts on the battlefield during the Kiev offensive, he was awarded the Cross of Valor and the Silver Cross of the War Order of Virtuti Militari, conferred by General Władysław Sikorski.

In the aftermath, Starowieyski became seriously ill with dysentery and barely survived after a long stay in a military hospital in Zambrów. He suffered from aftereffects of the disease for the rest of his life, including blood clots in his legs. After, he was promoted to the rank of captain. In July 1921, he was demobilized and transferred to the reserve. He was confirmed in the rank of captain of the artillery reserve with seniority on 1 June 1919. In 1923 and 1924, he served during reserve duty periods as an officer of the 9th Field Artillery Regiment in Biała Podlaska.

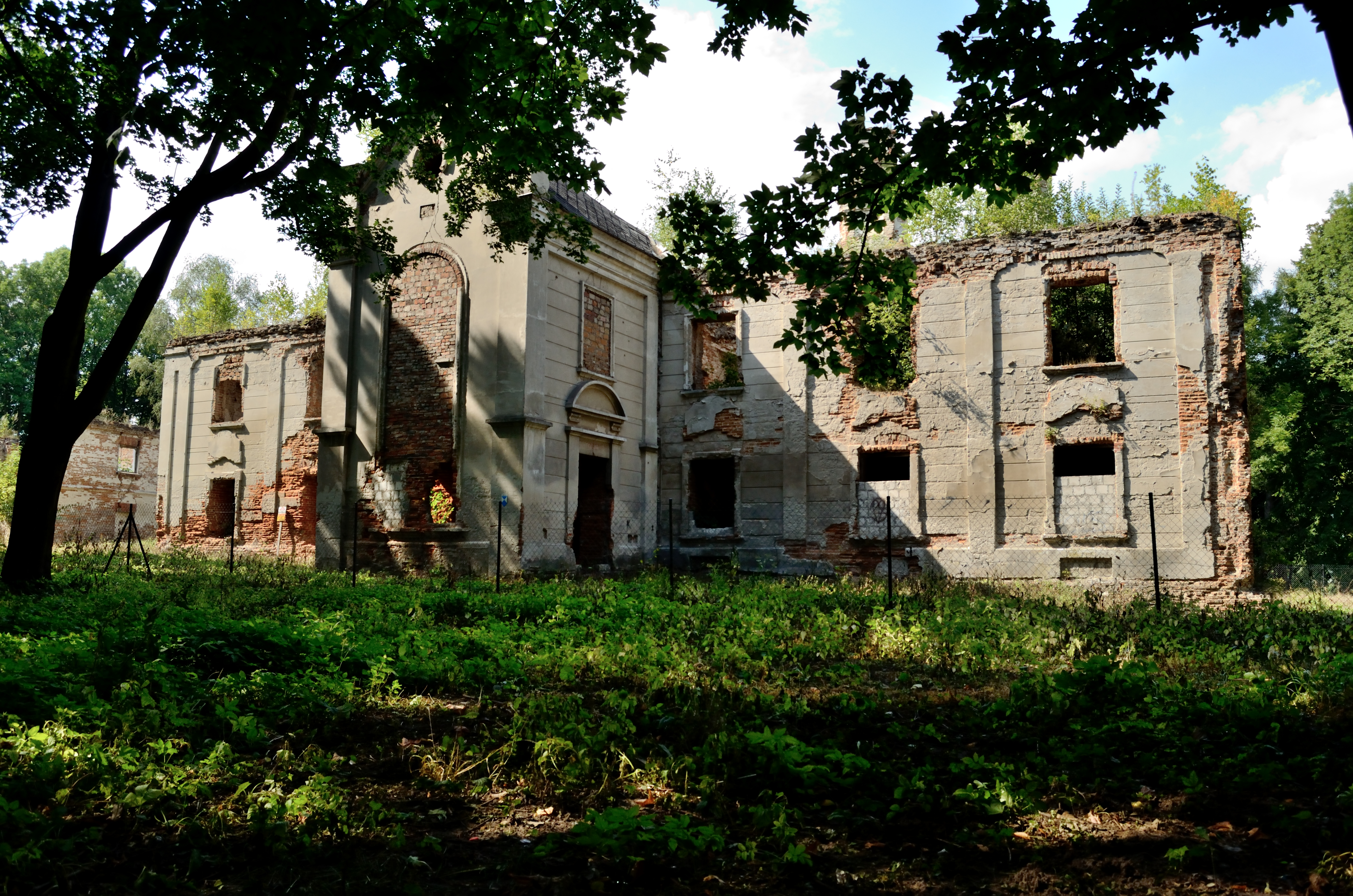
Former Szeptycki's manor in Łaszczów

On 24 August 1921, Stanisław married Maria Szeptycka (1894–1976) in Łabunie, officiated by his godfather, Father Franciszek Starowieyski. The young couple moved to the estate of Łaszczów, which was owned by Aleksander Szeptycki, Maria's father. The family manor had been completely devastated by wartime, and the pair had to live in a modest outbuilding. Maria and Stanisław had six children. Although both of them came from wealthy families, they did not intend to rebuild the burnt estate, recognizing that in the face of widespread poverty, their funds should be invested to serve the indigent and in favor of the training of Christian lay apostolate. As the family grew, their outbuilding was gradually transformed into a residential building.

Stanisław did not resume law study, but eventually completed an agricultural course. At that time, the couple was giving to charity and engaged in local activism, such as:

- financially supporting the education of lay Catholics;
- organizing and hosting retreats;
- establishing a Neighborhood Advice Circle (Polish: Koło Porad Sąsiedzkich) and a theater hall for stage amateurs;
- organizing a local branch of the Klub Inteligencji Katolickiej and their conventions. In September 1934, Stanisław co-organized the diocesan Eucharistic Congress in Chełm.

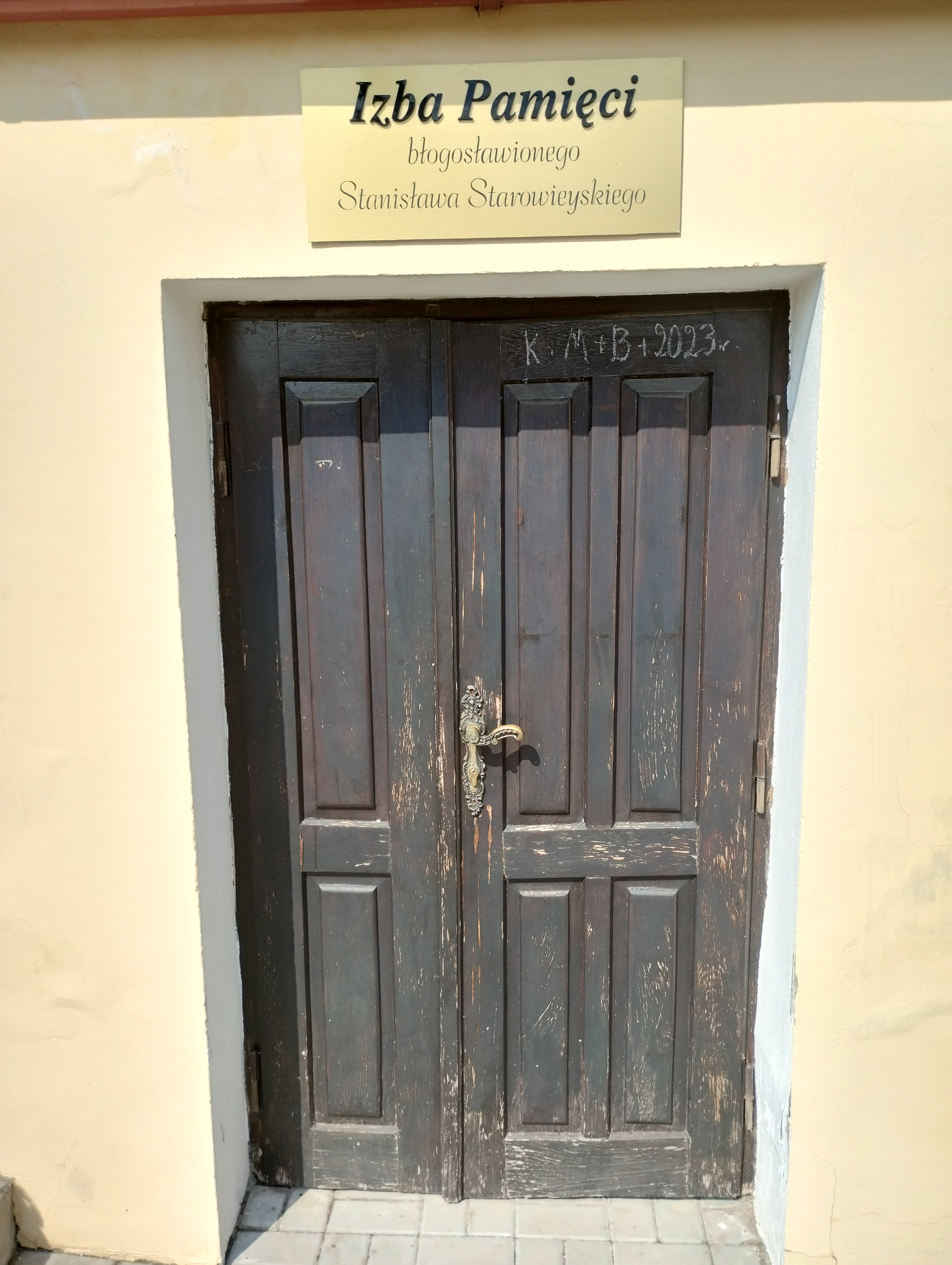
"Izba Pamięci" in Labunie

Starowieyski was especially active within the Akcja Katolicka group; in 1932, he was made vice president, then from 1935, the president of the Diocesan Institute of the Lublin branch. In this position, he wrote numerous papers and participated in ceremonies, retreats, conventions, courses and pilgrimages. In 1937, he took part in the International Congress in Honor of Christ the King (Polish: Międzynarodowy Kongres Chrystusa-Króla) in Poznań. On his way back to Łaszczów, he stopped at Niepokalanów, where he met Father Maksymilian Kolbe. In recognition of his dynamism and activism within the Catholic Church, Pope Pius XI awarded Stanisław the title of Papal Chamberlain in 1934.

=== Second World War ===
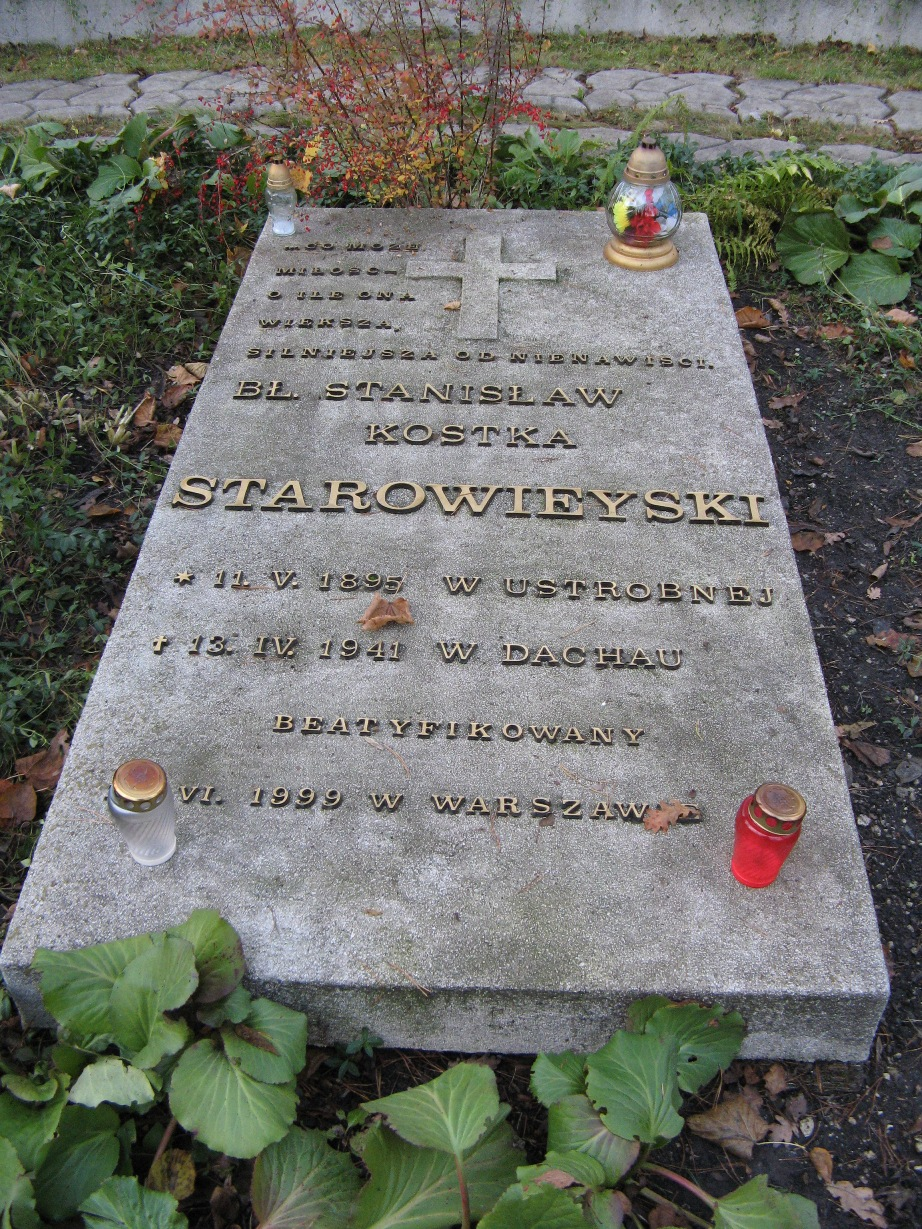
Tombstone of Bl. Stanislaw Starowiejskiego, Łabunie palace

At the outbreak of the Second World War, Starowieyski's house became an asylum for refugees of the Invasion of Poland in September 1939. After the Soviet invasion of Poland on 17 September 1939, Red Army troops moved into the Lublin region. The Starowieyski's manor was plundered by Soviet soldiers, and Stanisław and his brother Marian were arrested and imprisoned. They escaped during a transport en route to Tomaszów Lubelski. After the Soviet troops retreated behind the Bug River, Starowieyski returned to his estate at the end of September 1939.

During the German occupation, Stanisław kept giving to charity and supported the Diocesan Curia in Lublin. On 19 June 1940, he was arrested by the Gestapo and imprisoned in the Rotunda Zamość, then in the Lublin Castle, which was used as a prison.

He was moved afterwards to the Nazi concentration camp of Sachsenhausen, where he received the number 25711 and was placed in block 49. In September 1940, Stanisław was transported to the Dachau concentration camp and quartered in block 23 as prisoner 16532.

In Dachau, Stanisław still carried out apostolic activities among his fellow prisoners. However, as a representative of the Polish landed gentry and a Catholic activist, Starowieyski was singled out, severely persecuted and beaten by the camp officers. His health rapidly deteriorated, his legs swelling and prone to bleeding from varicose veins.

He died on 13 April 1941, Easter Sunday.

His ashes were returned in an urn to his family by the camp authorities. They were buried at the Szeptycki family cemetery in the manor of Łabunie, today owned by the Franciscan Missionaries of Mary.

Pope John Paul II beatified Stanisław Kostka Starowieyski on 13 June 1999, during a mass in Warsaw, as one of the 108 Martyrs of World War II.

== Decorations ==
- Knight's Cross of the Virtuti Militari
- Star of Przemyśl
- "Orlęta" Commemorative badge
- Cross of Valour

== Commemorations ==
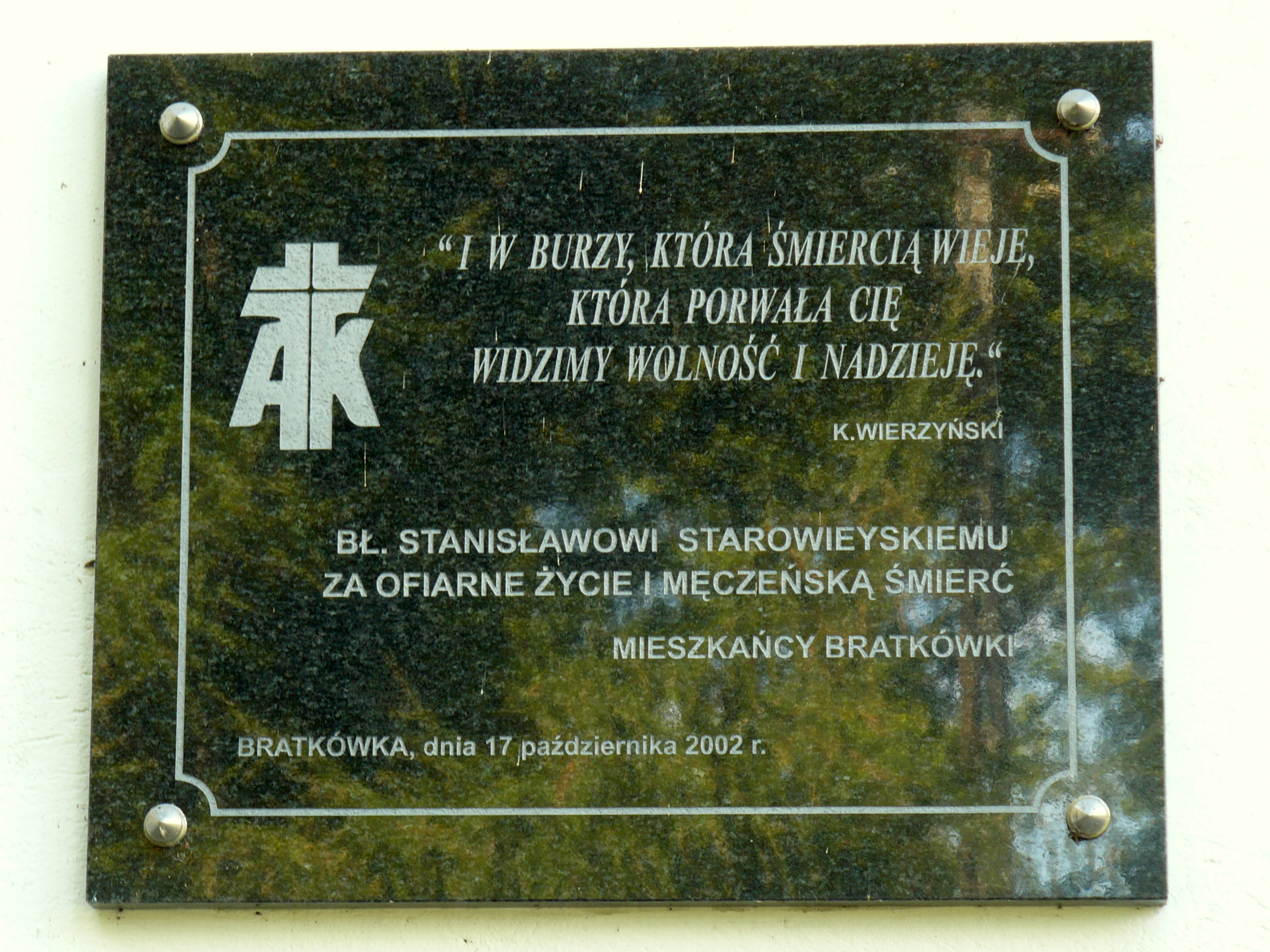
Commemorative plaque, Starowieyski's manor house, Bratkówka

On the 70th anniversary of his death, Stanisław Starowieyski was made the patron of the Catholic Action movement in Poland. The patronage of his name was granted to the following educational institutions:

- the Primary School in Bratkówka (Polish: Szkoła Podstawowa w Bratkówce);
- the Secondary School in Łaszczów (Polish: Liceum Ogólnokształcące w Łaszczowie);
- Zamojska Szkoła Ewangelizacji (English: Zamość School of Evangelization).

A commemorative plaque recalling his memory was unveiled in Bratkówka, at the Starowieyski's manor house, on 17 October 2002.

Since 18 June 2017, the Church of the Holy Apostles Peter and Paul in Łaszczów has been housing Blessed Stanisław's indirect relic: his holy rosary, which was kept by his wife after he was arrested and deported. The rosary moved eventually into the hands of his grandson, Wojciech Starowieyski, who donated it to the church in Łaszczów with the consent of Marian Rojek, the bishop of the Diocese of Zamość-Lubaczów.

== Family ==
=== Ancestors ===
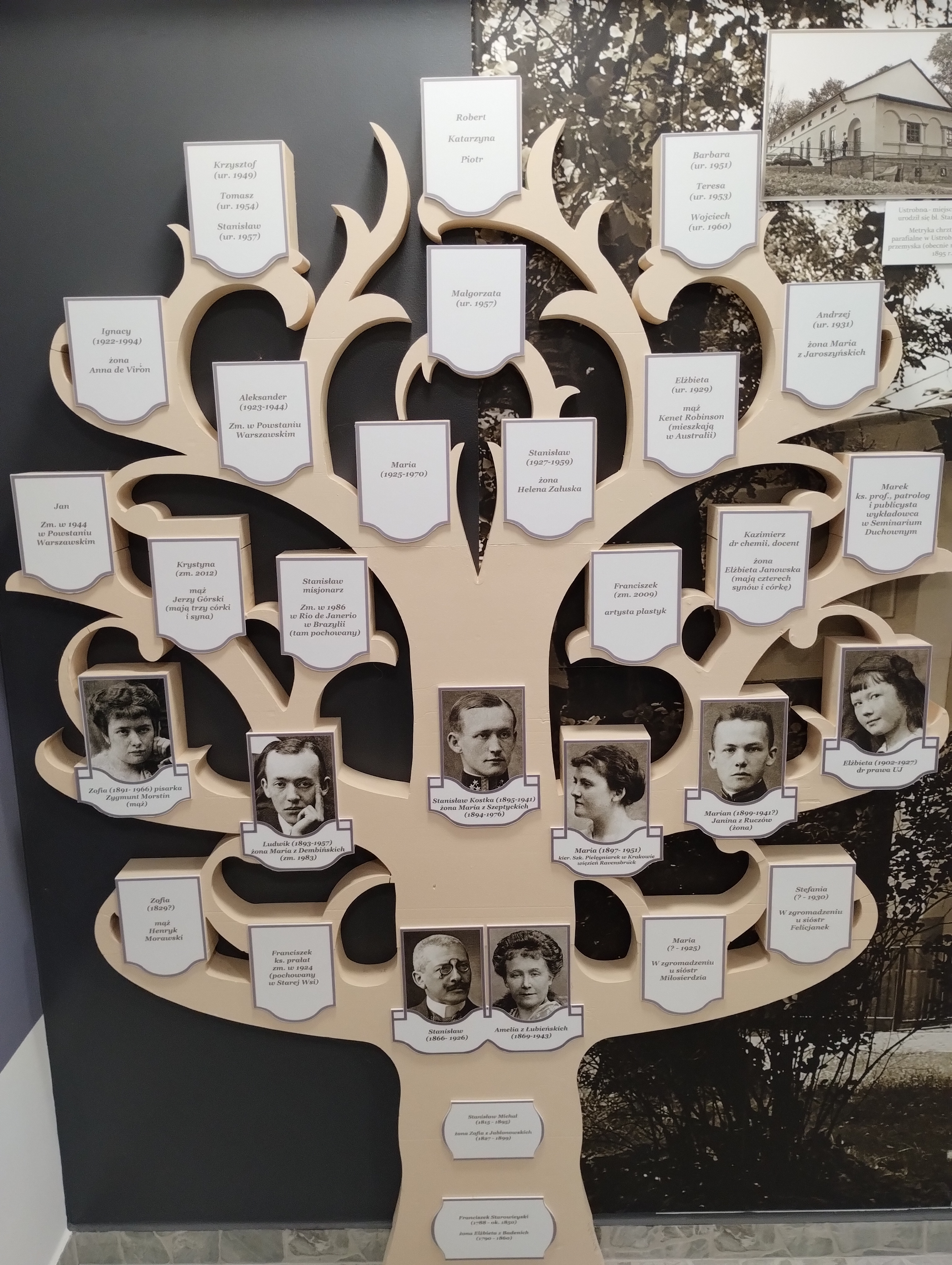
Starowieyski family tree

- Stanisław's grandfather was Stanisław Michał Starowieyski (1815–1895), a landowner, member of the Imperial Council and of the Diet of Galicia and Lodomeria.
- Stanisław's father was Stanisław Jan Starowieyski (1866–1926).
- Stanisław's father-in-law was Aleksander Maria Szeptycki (1866–1940), who was tortured to death by the Gestapo on 19 June 1940, in the Rotunda Zamość. He was a landowner and had the following siblings:
  - Blessed Klymentiy Sheptytsky (1869–1951);
  - general Stanisław Szeptycki (1867–1950);
  - Metropolitan bishop Andrey Sheptytsky (1865–1944);
  - Leon, a landowner.

=== Siblings ===
- Zofia Starowieyska-Morstinowa (1891–1966), a Polish essayist and literature critic. Five days after she died (8 July 1966), a mass was said in her intention, celebrated by then-Archbishop Karol Wojtyła (Pope John Paul II).
- Ludwik (1896–1958), a year older than Stanisław. They went to the same school in 1905–1908. Ludwik married Maria Idalia Dembińska. He was a reserve second lieutenant in the cavalry of the Polish Army.
- Maria (1896–1951), who worked in a school for nurses.
- Marian (1899–1939), doctor of law, allegedly killed by Russians soldiers. He fathered 3 sons, Franciszek (1930-2009), Kazimierz (born 1931) and MArek (born 1937).
- Iza (1902–1927), a law graduate who worked at the "Państwowy Bank Rolny" (English: State Agricultural Bank).

=== Close family ===
His wife Maria Szeptycka (1894–1976) was the great-granddaughter of Polish poet and author Aleksander Fredro. The couple had six children:

- Ignacy (1922–1994);
- Aleksander (1923–1944), who died during the Warsaw Uprising (nom-de-guerre Oleś);
- Maria (1925–1970), who participated in the Warsaw Uprising (nom-de-guerre Mysłowska);
- Stanisław (1927–1959) who participated in the Warsaw Uprising (nom-de-guerre Rak);
- Elżbieta (1929–still alive);
- Andrzej (1931–2013) who participated in the Warsaw Uprising.

=== Other family members ===
Nephews

- Marek Starowieyski (born 1937), a Polish Catholic priest, prelate. A professor in theology, he published research papers on ancient Christianity and patrology.
- Franciszek Starowieyski (1930–2009), a Polish graphic designer.

Grandchild

- Małgorzata Starowieyska (1953–2006), aka Mao Star, was a Polish painter, performer, stage designer, and choreographer.

== Palace in Łabunie – Count Aleksander Szeptycki ==
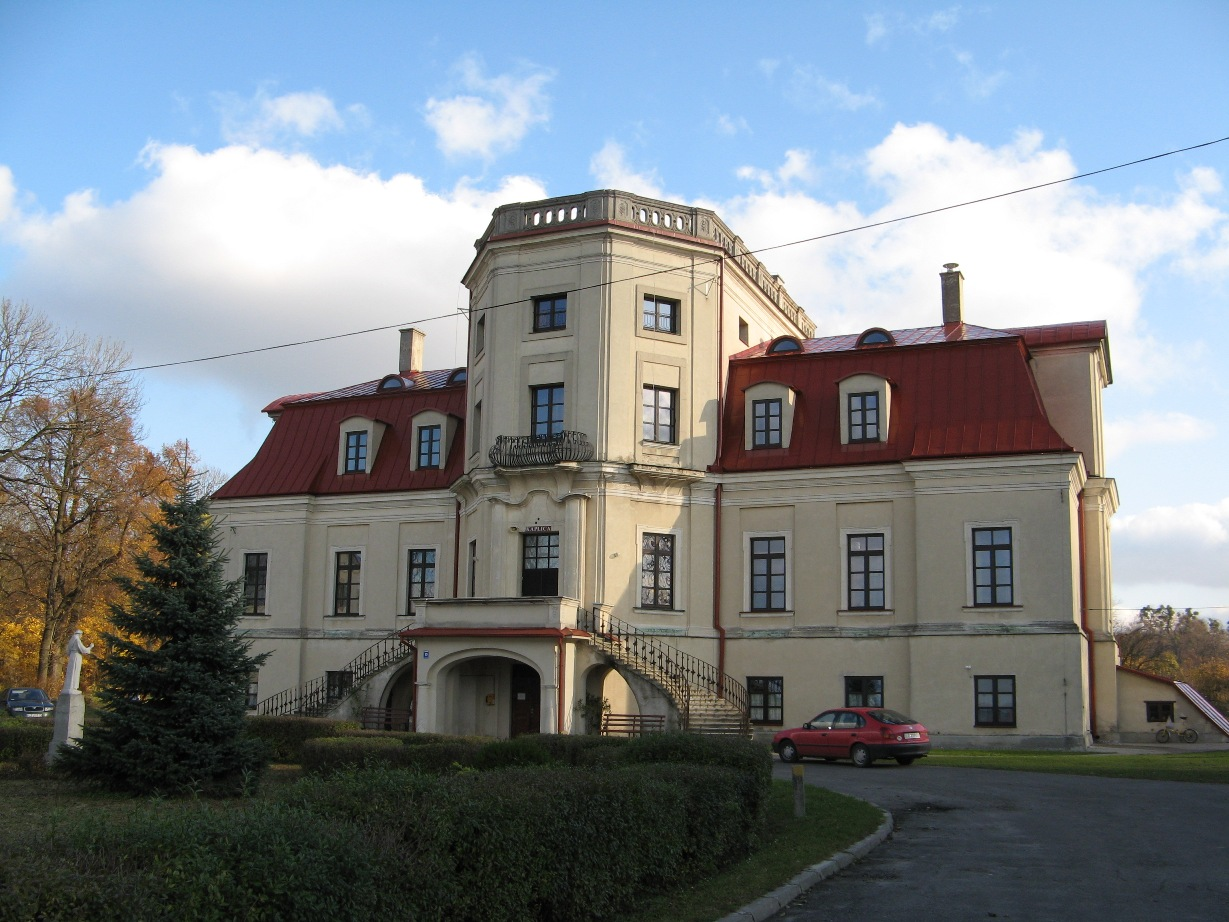
Łabunie palace, main corps

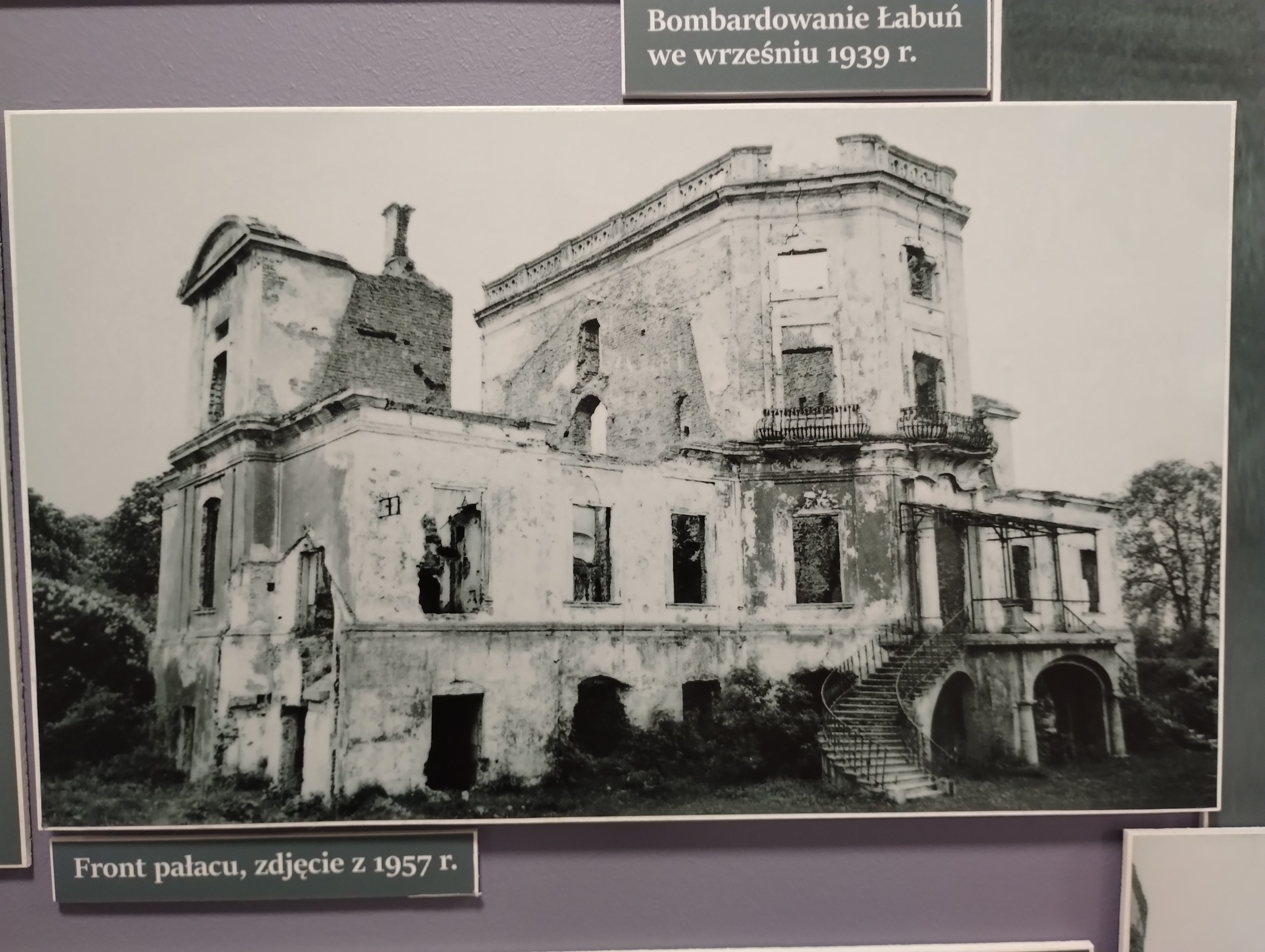
Palac in 1957

The palace was erected as a summer residence for Jan Jakub Zamoyski, the voivode of Podolia who married Ludwika Maria Poniatowska, the sister of the King of Poland, Stanisław August Poniatowski.

In the late 19th century, after several changes of ownership, Jan Stanisław Tarnowski sold this property near Zamość to Count Aleksander Maria Szeptycki, Stanisław Starowieyski's future father-in-law. The Szeptycki family did not live there, preferring the estate of Łaszczów. They moved to Łabunie in the early 1920s, inhabiting a small mansion located 500 metres (0.31 mi) from the palace itself.

In 1922, Aleksander Szeptycki bequeathed the palace complex, with its 25 hectares (62 acres) park and outbuildings, to the Franciscan Missionaries of Mary (FMM), who had been running an orphanage there with his approval. The Count's decision was a gift to the congregation in gratitude for taking care of his sick daughter Zofia, who suffered from tuberculosis and died in 1917, in Łabunie. On 26 June 1922, three FMM sisters fled Odessa, escaping the Russian Civil War. Zofia Maria Bronisława Szeptycki (1904–1958), one of the Count's nieces, became the superior of the Polish Province of the FMM.

The palace suffered heavily during the Second World War: 85% of the buildings were destroyed. After a partial reconstruction, FMM sisters moved back to Łabunie in 1963.

In September 2019, the FMM congregation opened a memorial area in honor of Blessed Stanisław Starowieyski in the palace Izba Pamięci. A modest necropolis of the Szeptycki family (including Stanisław Starowieyski's ashes) has been established in a circle around a wooden cross, on the outskirts of the park. Surrounding the palace are graves of the FMM sisters.

== See also ==
- Bydgoszcz
- 108 Martyrs of World War II
- Polish–Ukrainian War
- Polish–Soviet War
- Franciscan Missionaries of Mary
- List of saints of Poland
- Szeptycki family

== Bibliography ==
- Starowieyski, Marek (2010). Sprawiedliwy z Wiary Żyje Życie i Męczeństwo Bł. Stanisława Starowieyskiego [Righteous by Faith Lives the Life and Martyrdom of Blessed Stanislaw Starowieyski] (in Polish). Kraków: Petrus.
- Kulik, Zbigniew (2005). Bł. Stanisław Kostka Starowieyski 1895-1941 [Blessed Stanislaw Kostka Starowieyski 1895-1941] (in Polish). Kraków: Wydawnictwo Diecezjalne i Drukarnia.
- Sister Irena, Marawska (2016). Historia Pisana życiem. Łabunie - Mały przewodnik [History Written by Life. Łabunie - A small guide.] (in Polish). Łabunie: Łabunska Biblioteczka Regionalisty. ISBN 978-83-62989-98-0.
