= Old City (Zamość) =

Old City of Zamość
UNESCO World Heritage Site
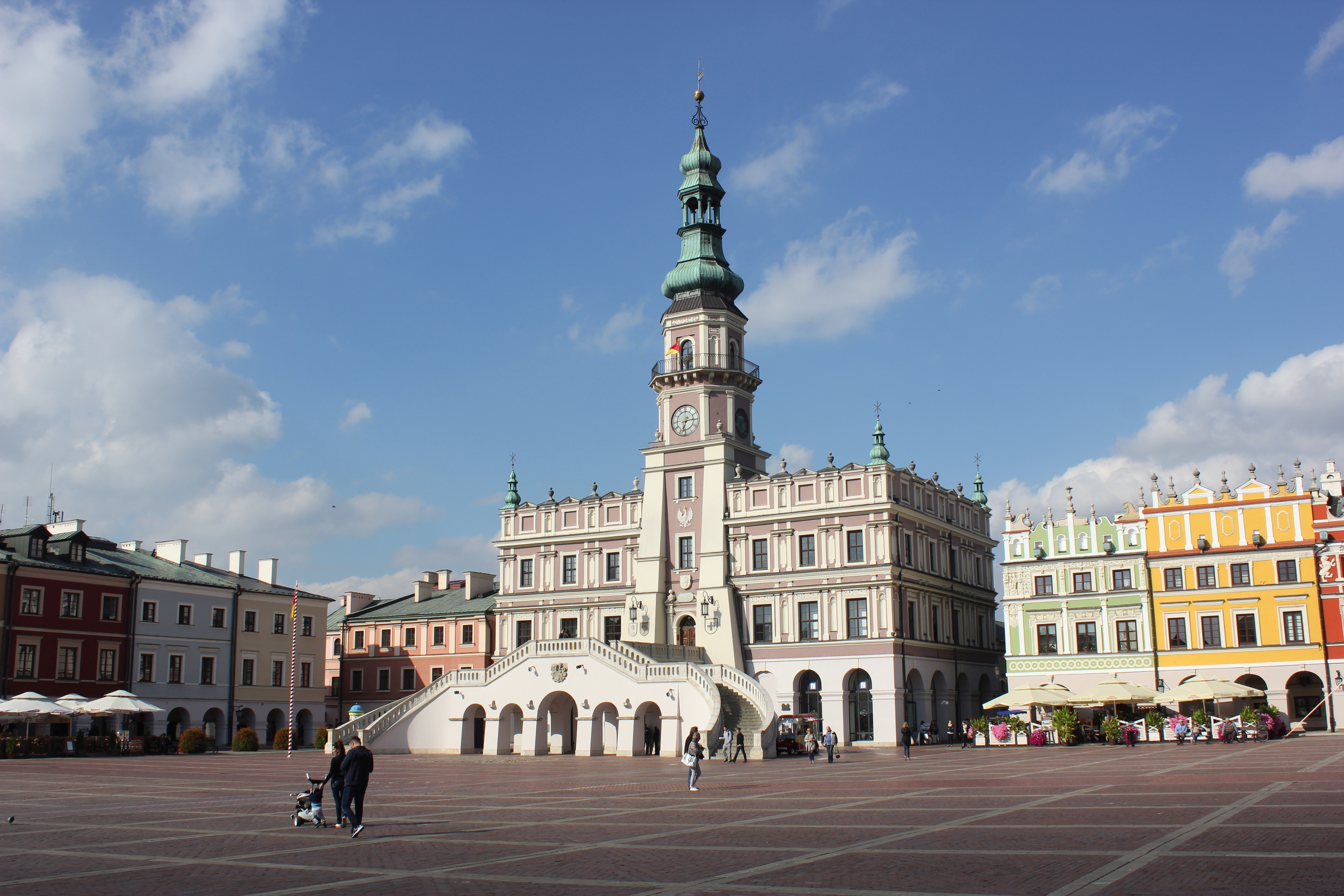
- Main Square with the City Hall

- Location within Lublin Voivodeship Location within Poland
- Location: Zamość, Lublin Voivodeship, Poland
- Criteria: Cultural: (iv)
- Reference: 564
- Inscription: 1992 (16th Session)
- Area: 75.04 ha (185.4 acres)
- Buffer zone: 214.92 ha (531.1 acres)
- Coordinates: 50°43′N 23°16′E

The osiedle Old City (Polish: Osiedle Stare Miasto) is the oldest historic district of the city of Zamość. It is one of World Heritage Sites in Poland (added in 1992). According to UNESCO, this monument value lies in it being "an outstanding example of a Renaissance planned town of the late 16th century, which retains its original layout and fortifications and many buildings of particular interest, blending Italian and Central European architectural traditions". The Medieval Town has an area of 75 ha and a buffer zone of 200 ha.

The district was named one of Poland's official national Historic Monuments (Pomnik historii), as designated September 16, 1994. Its listing is maintained by the National Heritage Board of Poland.

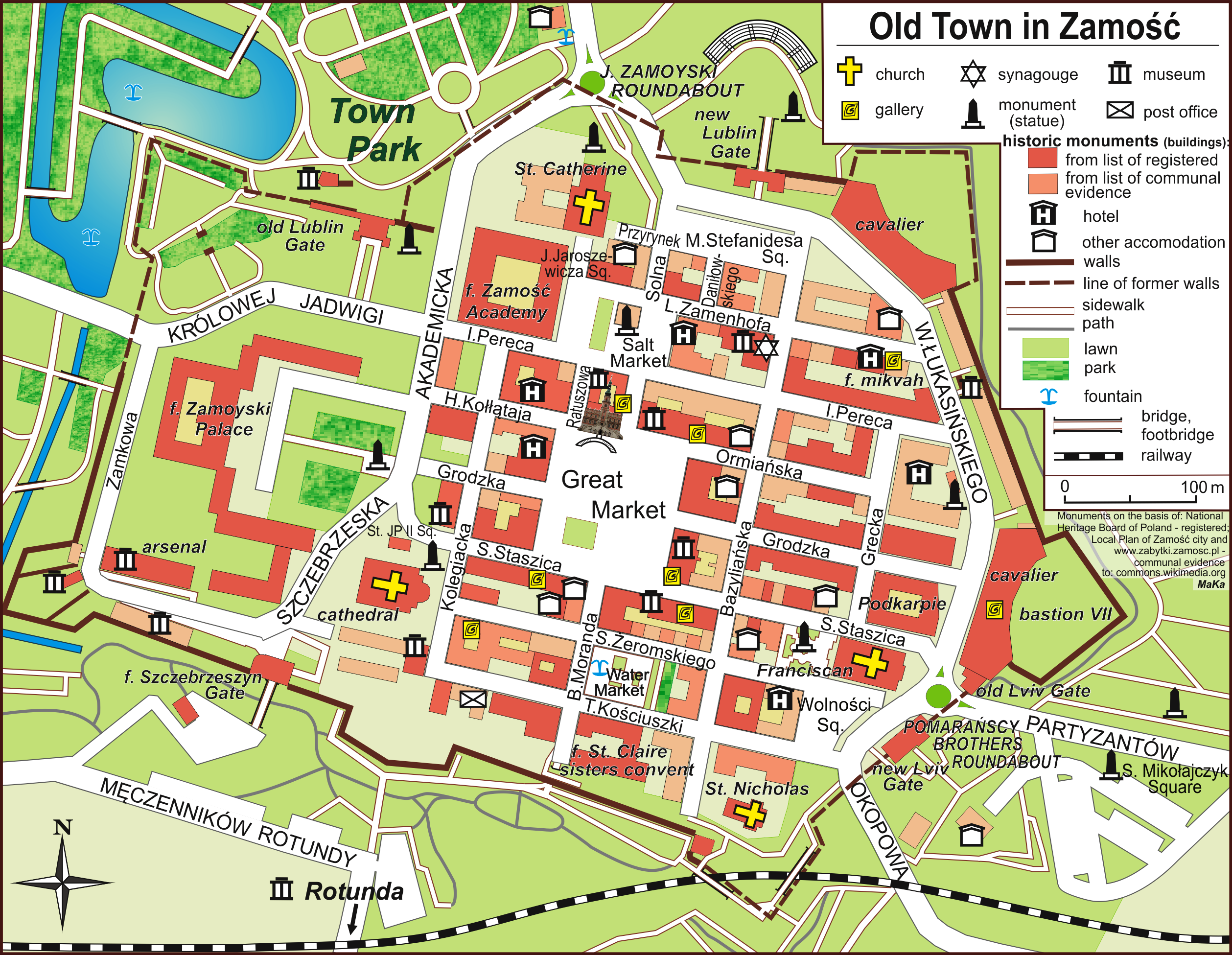
Map of the Old City of Zamość

== History ==
Zamość was built in the late 16th century in accordance with the Italian theories of the "ideal town." The construction of this new town was sponsored by Jan Zamoyski, and carried out by architect Bernardo Morando. The town shows examples of Renaissance style, mingling "Mannerist taste [...] with certain Central European urban traditions, such as the arcaded galleries that surround the squares and create a sheltered passage in front of the shops".

== Geography and monuments ==
Morando designed the town as on a hexagonal plan with two distinct sections: on the west the noble residences, and on the east the town proper, developed around three squares (the Grand Market Square, the Salt Market Square and the Water Market Square).

Key monuments of Zamość include about 200 monuments, including the Grand Market Square surrounded by numerous tenament houses and Zamość City Hall. The Old Town also sports the Zamość Cathedral, the Zamość Synagogue, the Zamojski Academy, and the Zamojski Palace.

The Old Town is surrounded by the remains of the Zamość Fortress.

== UNESCO World Heritage Site ==
The World Heritage Committee passed Zamość as a World Heritage Site in 1992 on the basis of criteria (iv - "is an outstanding example of a type of building, architectural, or technological ensemble or landscape which illustrates a significant stage in human history"). In this particular case, Zamość was recognized as "an outstanding example of a Renaissance planned town of the late 16th century, which retains its original layout and fortifications and many buildings of particular interest, blending Italian and Central European architectural traditions."

== See also ==
- History of Zamość
