= Bajdy =

Bajdy refers to the following places in Poland:

- Bajdy, Podkarpackie Voivodeship
- Bajdy, Warmian-Masurian Voivodeship
