= Wojkówka =

- Village
- Location within Poland
- Coordinates: 49°47′N 21°42′E
- Country: Poland
- Voivodeship: Subcarpathian
- County: Krosno
- Gmina: Wojaszówka
- Population: 319

Note: The following information is the English translation of the information found on the same entry on pl.wikipedia.org

Wojkówka – a village in Poland located in the Podkarpackie Voivodeship, in Krosno County, in the Wojaszówka Commune. It has the status of a village council .

In the years 1975–1998 the town administratively belonged to the Krosno Voivodeship.

== Parts of the village ==
Integral parts of the village of Wojkówka
SIMC	Name	Type
0362559	Na Bukowinie	part of the village
0362565	Na Górach	part of the village
0362571	Przylasek	part of the village
0362588	Zawodzie	part of the village

== History ==
In the 14th century, Wojkówka was owned by Henryk Sobieński, owner of Sobień Castle near Sanok . In 1397, Klemens Moskarzewski purchased the villages near Odrzykoń Castle : Wojkówka and Bratkówka, from Henryk Sobieński . Then, in the 15th century, Wojkówka belonged to the Sapieha family. From 1484, Wojkówka was owned by the Szebieński family. The village was ruled by the following village heads: Jan (1443), Sądek (1417-1420), Szczebiot (1443), Piotr (1450), and Mikołaj (1497-1499).

In 1512, as a result of the family division, Wojkówka became the owner of Marcin Kamieniecki , the chamberlain of Sanok, and later his son Jan Kamieniecki (born 1524 at Kamieniec Castle in Odrzykoń – died February 5, 1560), whose tombstone is located at the Franciscan Monastery in Krosno. In 1536, its leaseholder was a nobleman, Baltazar Dąbrowski . From the Kamienicki family, Wojkówka passed into the possession of the Skotnicki family, and then, in the 17th century, into the ownership of the Tarnowski family. Kazimierz Aleksander Tarnowski married Teresa Firlejówna, the heiress of Wojkówka in the mid-17th century.

Franciszka, daughter of Count Tarnowski, married Klemens Ustrzycki , the castellan of Sanok, in 1688 in Łęki. From them, Wojkówka passed into the possession of the Górski family. Since 1757, Wojkówka has been owned by Ignacy Górski de Przybow , a Sandomierz clerk and owner of neighboring Ustrobna. His wife, Elżbieta Cieszanowska, had 15 children. After him, Wojkówka was inherited by his son, Feliks Górski , who died of a stroke during a fire in the manor stables in 1839. After Feliks's death, his heirs sold the village to the Wiktor family.

In the village there is a brick chapel dedicated to St. Sophia.

== Born in Wojkówka ==
- Jan Wiewiórski (born 1842 - died after 1864) – January Uprising participant of 1863-1864, participant of the battles of Stefanków, Boria, Białobrzegi, Rzeczniów and Zawichost, fighting in the units of Major Andrzej Łopacki , Colonel Dionizy Czachowski and General Józef Wysocki.

== See also ==
See the entry Wojkówka in the index of the Geographical Dictionary of the Kingdom of Poland

- Wojkowo

== Footnotes ==
1. State Register of Geographical Names – localities – XLSX format , Data from the state register of geographical names – PRNG, Head Office of Geodesy and Cartography , November 5, 2023, PRNG identifier : 151007.
2. Report on the state of the Wojaszówka commune in 2024. Number of inhabitants as of December 31, 2024, p. 9
3. Official List of Postal Address Numbers, Poczta Polska SA, October 2013, p.1474 [archived from the address 2014-02-22].
4. GUS. TERYT Register
5. Regulation of the Minister of Administration and Digitization of 13 December 2012 on the list of official names of localities and their parts ( Journal of Laws of 2013, item 200 )
6. BIP of the commune and village council
7. Marian Hubert Terlecki, Participation of the inhabitants of Krosno and the region in the January Uprising [in:] Krosno. Studies in the history of the city and region, vol. 5, Krosno 2010, p. 138
