= Rzepnik, Podkarpackie Voivodeship =

Rzepnik
- Village
- Location within Poland
- Coordinates: 49°48′N 21°45′E
- Country: Poland
- Voivodeship: Subcarpathian
- County: Krosno
- Gmina: Wojaszówka

Rzepnik [ˈʐɛpnik] is a village in the administrative district of Gmina Wojaszówka, within Krosno County, Subcarpathian Voivodeship, in south-eastern Poland.

Its registered population as of March 2021 census is 150.
