= Łączki Jagiellońskie =

- Village
- Location within Poland
- Coordinates: 49°48′N 21°42′E
- Country: Poland
- Voivodeship: Subcarpathian
- County: Krosno
- Gmina: Wojaszówka

Łączki Jagiellońskie (Polish pronunciation: [ˈwɔnt͡ʂkʲi jaɡʲɛ(l)ˈlɔj̃skʲɛ]) is a village in the administrative district of Gmina Wojaszówka, within Krosno County, Subcarpathian Voivodeship, in south-eastern Poland.
