= Zamość Rotunda =

Museum of Martyrdom of the Zamość region - Rotunda
- Muzeum Martyrologii Zamojszczyzny - Rotunda
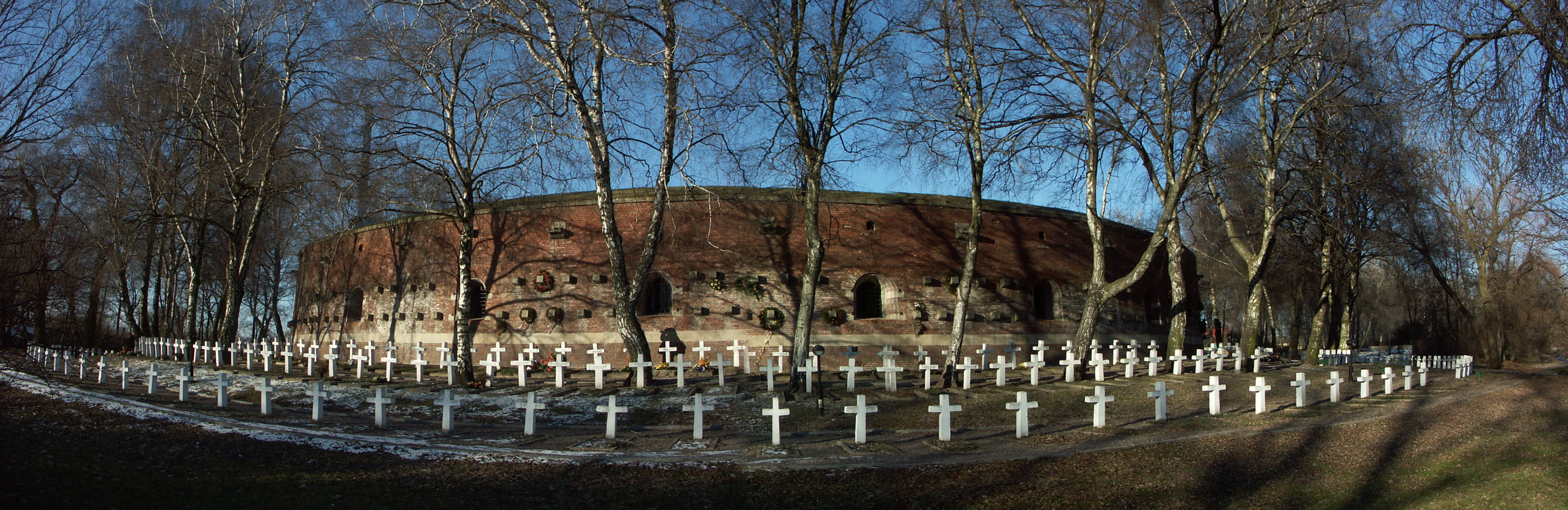
- Museum of Martyrdom of the Zamość region - Rotunda
- Location: Zamość, Poland
- Coordinates: 50.710833°N 23.247222°E

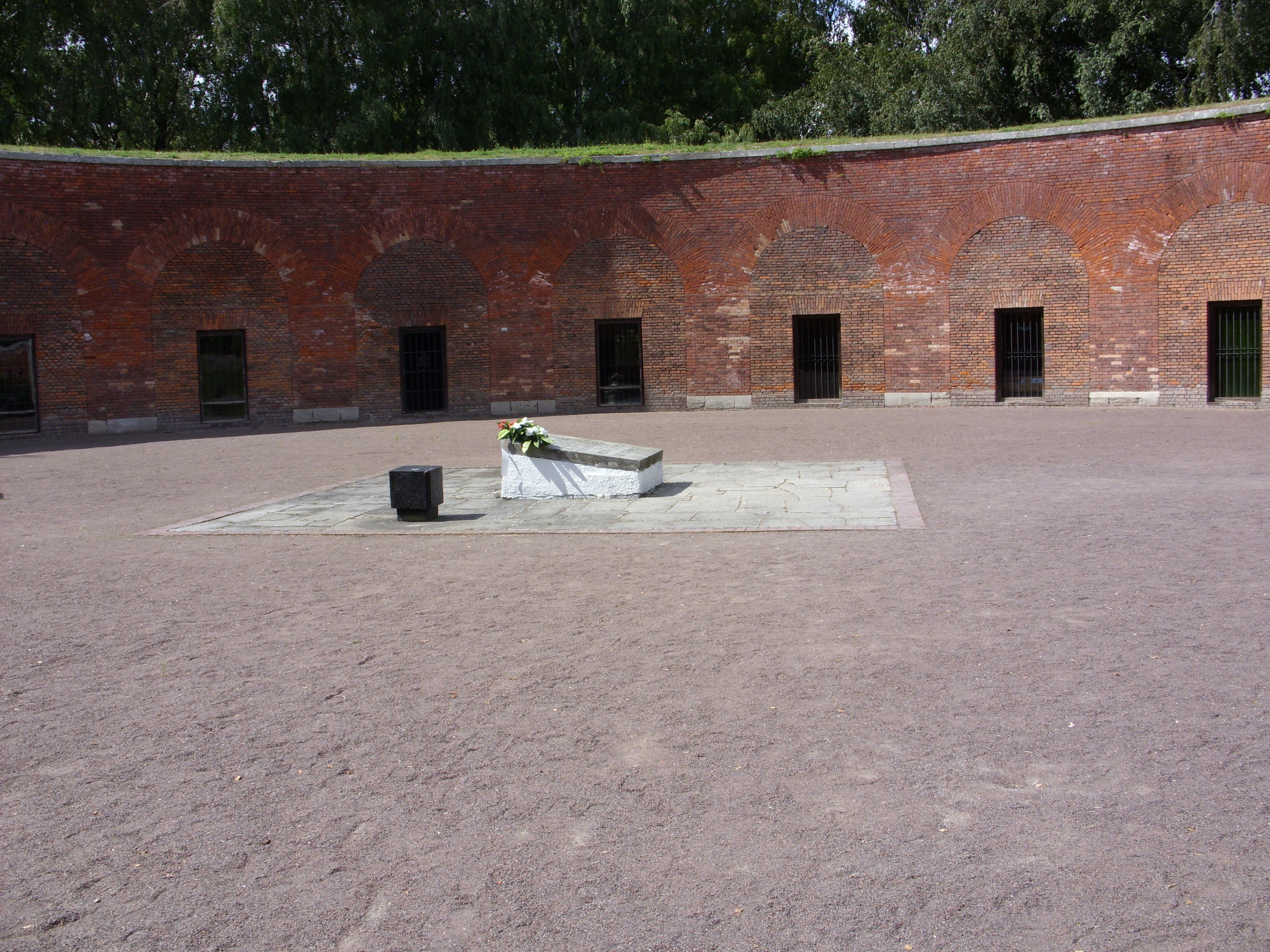
Rotunda Zamosc. Stone plaque commemorating the site of the cremation of human bodies

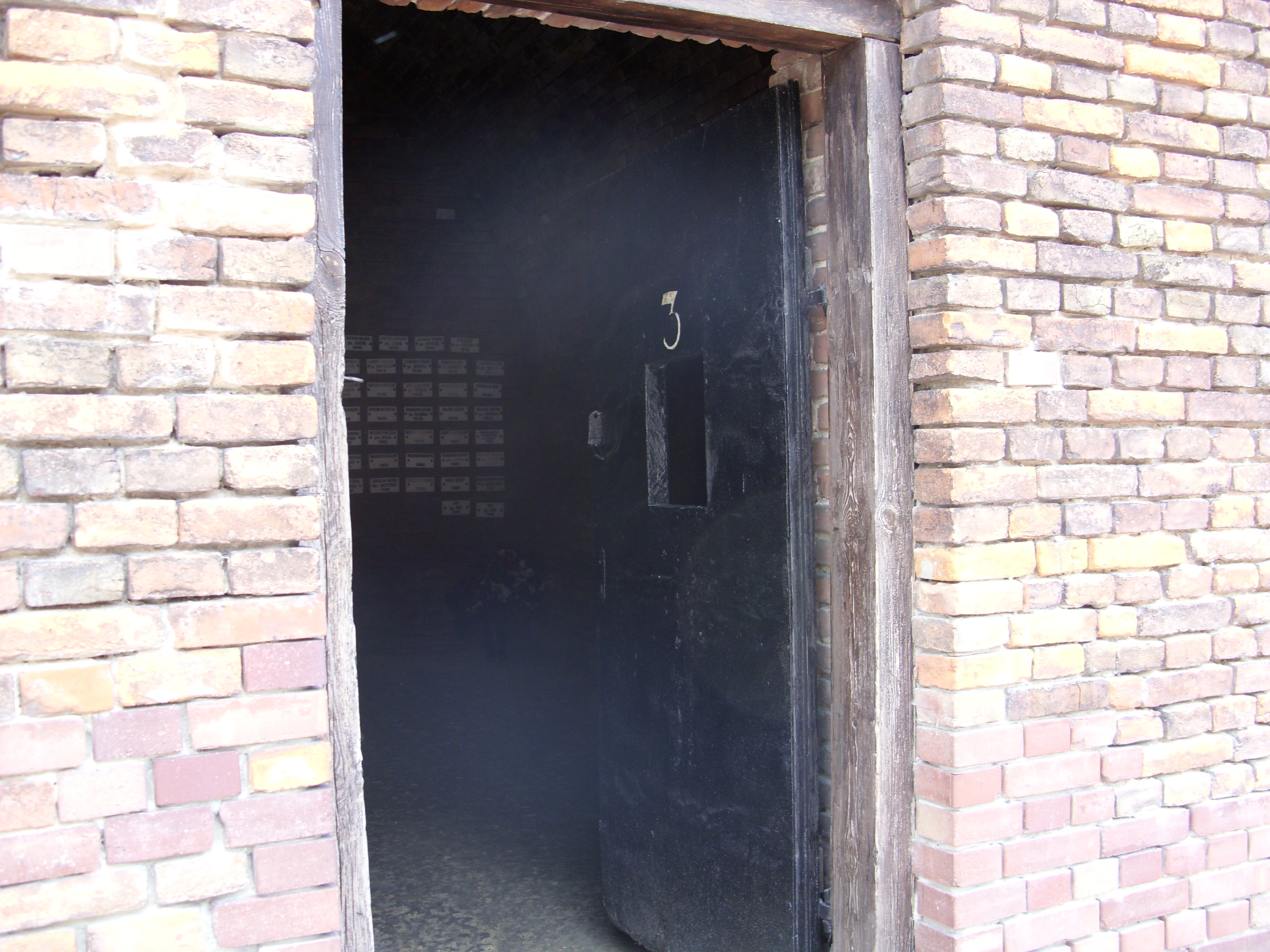
Entrance to cell No. 3. Rotunda Zamosc. Gestapo camp 1940-1944

The Zamość Rotunda (Polish: Rotunda Zamojska, also known as the Museum of Martyrdom of the Zamość Region - Rotunda (Polish: Muzeum Martyrologii Zamojszczyzny - Rotunda), is a Polish museum devoted to remembering the atrocities committed at the former Rotunda Zamość Nazi German camp located in Zamość near Lublin. The Nazi German Gestapo camp was set up in occupied Poland during World War II, as part of the Polish extermination program known as the German AB-Aktion in Poland, Ethnic cleansing of Zamojszczyzna by Nazi Germany....

== History ==
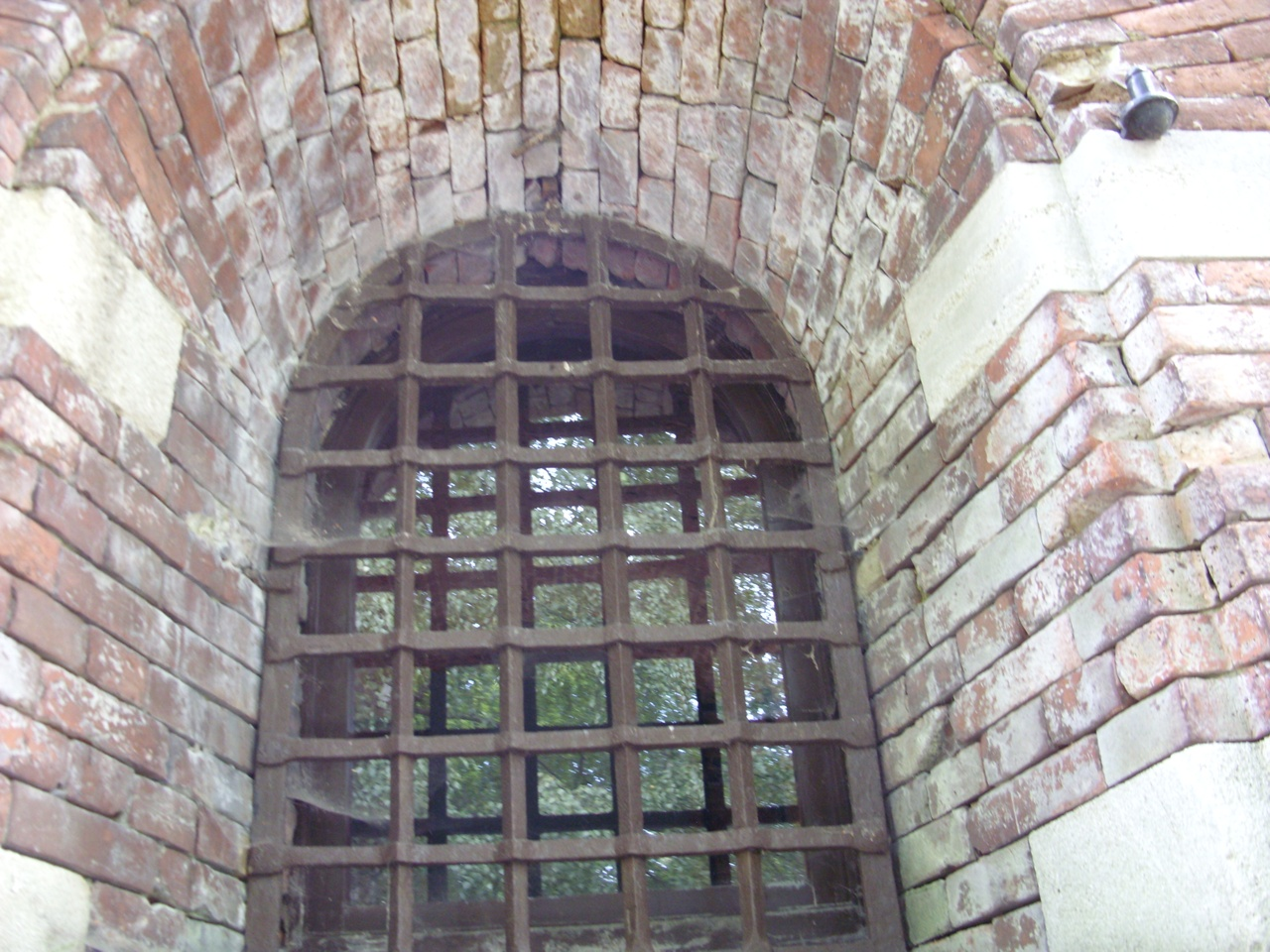
Window and walls of the Zamość Rotunda of the German camp from 1940 to 1944

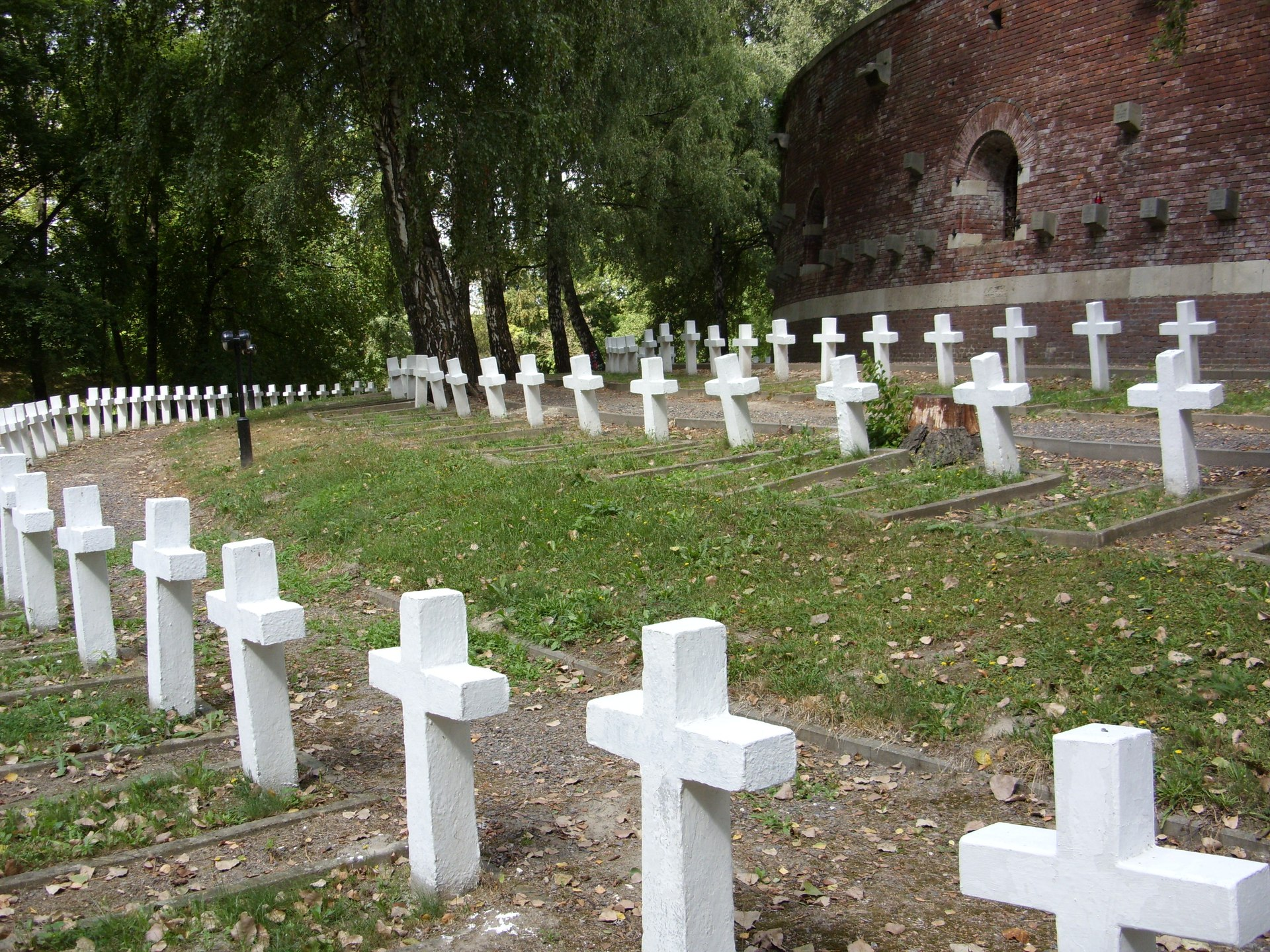
Rotunda Zamość. Quarter of the Victims of Nazi Genocide.

The rotunda was built between 1825 and 1831 in accordance with the design of General Jean-Baptiste Mallet de Grandville as part of the fortifications of the Zamość Fortress. During World War II and German AB-Aktion in Poland in 1940 it was taken over by the German Gestapo precinct. It served as a prison, holding camp and a place of mass execution.

Eight thousand people died in the Gestapo Rotunda camp in Zamość. Nobody was tried for those crimes. During Generalplan Ost and the Ethnic cleansing of Zamojszczyzna by Nazi Germany, German forces resettled 297 villages, including roughly 110,000 Polish people, with 16,000 being sent to Majdanek concentration camp, and 2,000 to KL Auschwitz-Birkenau. Additionally, 30,000 children were resettled, with 4,500 Polish children from the Zamosc Region being deported to Germany to undergo Germanisation.

The gate which leads to the yard has the original doors with an inscription in German which reads: The temporary camp for the prisoners of Security Police. In German: Gefangenen-Durchgangslager Sicherheitspol.

The last execution took place on 20 and 21 July 1944, when 150 people were shot.

A stone plaque In the center of the courtyard commemorates the site of the cremation of human bodies. Here Nazi criminals burnt the bodies of the victims they had murdered, prisoners of the Rotunda. May they rest in peace.

The cemetery around the Rotunda contains the ashes of more than 45 thousand people.

Rotunda. War cemetery.

- Quarter of Soldiers of the Polish Army killed in September 1939 in Invasion of Poland
- Quarter of the Soldiers of the Home Army
- Quarter of the Victims of Nazi Genocide
- Quarter of the Soldiers of the Red Army
- Quarter of Jewish Victims
- The Grave of the Victims of Stalin's Genocide

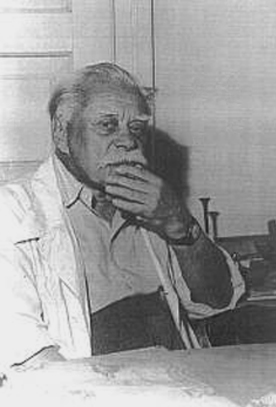
Doctor Zygmunt Klukowski prisoner

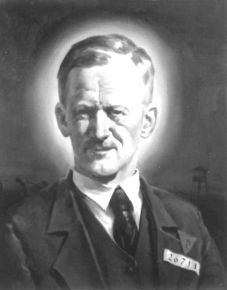
blessed Stanisław Kostka Starowieyski, prisoner

Prisoners of Rotunda included Dr Zygmunt Klukowski, blessed Stanisław Kostka Starowieyski, 16 year-old schoolgirl scout Grażyna Kierszniewska, 17 year-old schoolgirl Danuta Sztarejko, Celina Sztarejko, count Aleksander Szeptycki, Michał Nowacki (Vice Mayor of Zamość), Wacław Bajkowski (president of Lublin), colonel Zdzisław Maćkowski (Home Army Soldier), his sons Zdzisław and Jan, his wife Pelagia Maćkowska, Michał Wazowski (Mayor of Zamość), priest Antoni Gomółka (chaplain of scouts), farmer Władysław Szala, his 19-year-old son Jan Szala, and notary Henryk Rosiński. It is estimated that over 50,000 people passed through the camp.

== Gallery ==
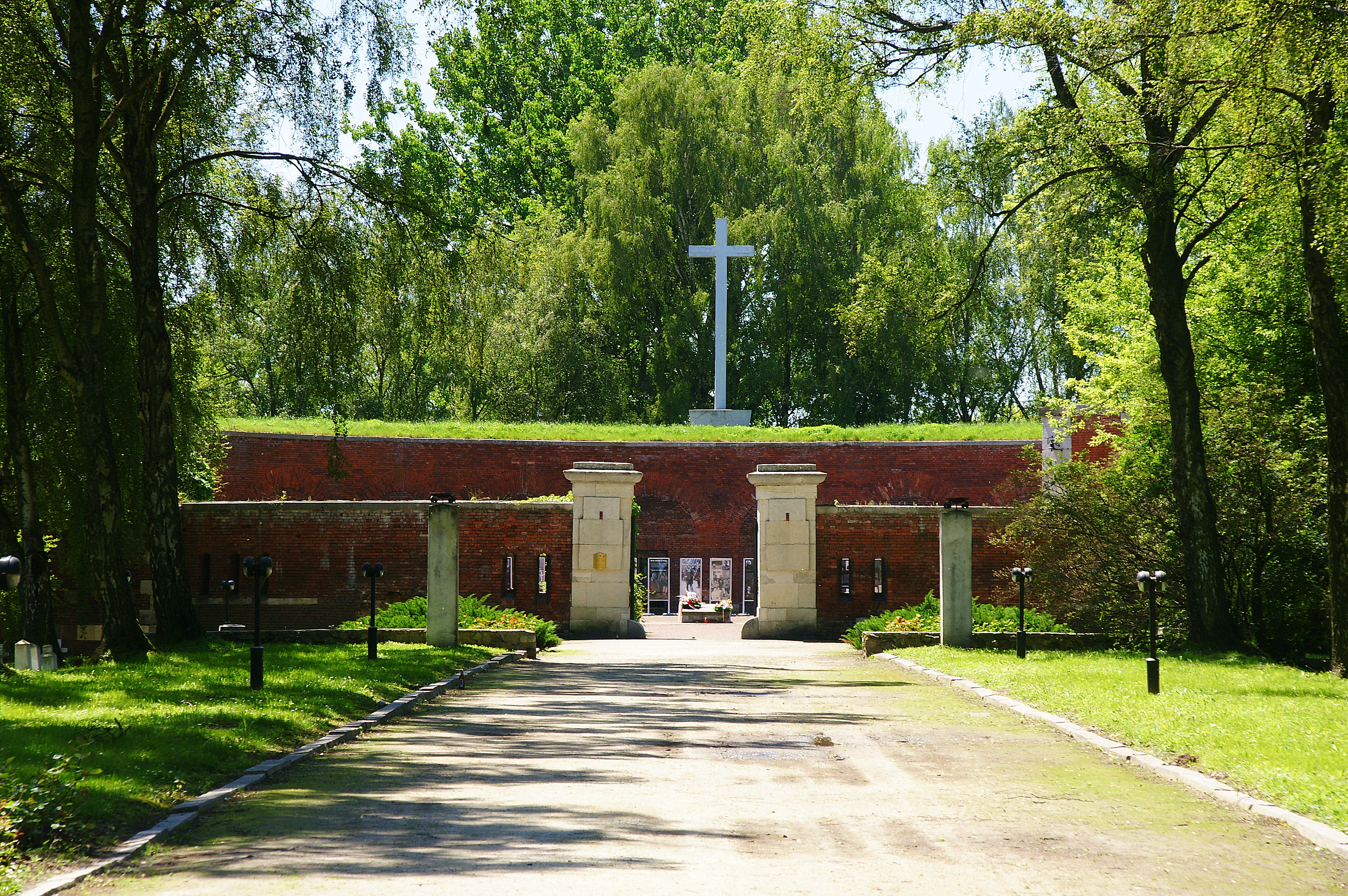
Rotunda Zamość. Route

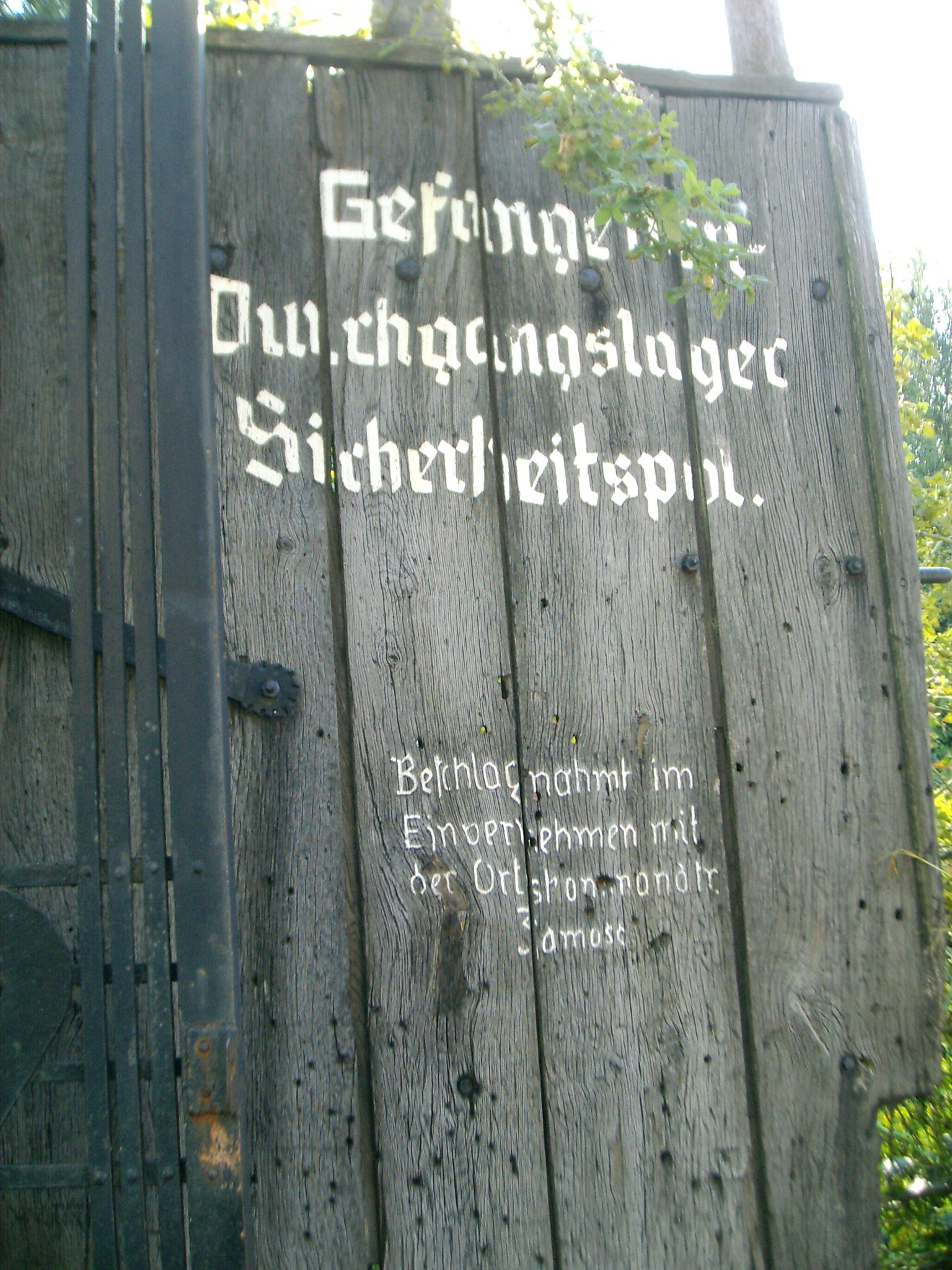
Rotunda's gate. The temporary camp for the prisoners of Security Police.

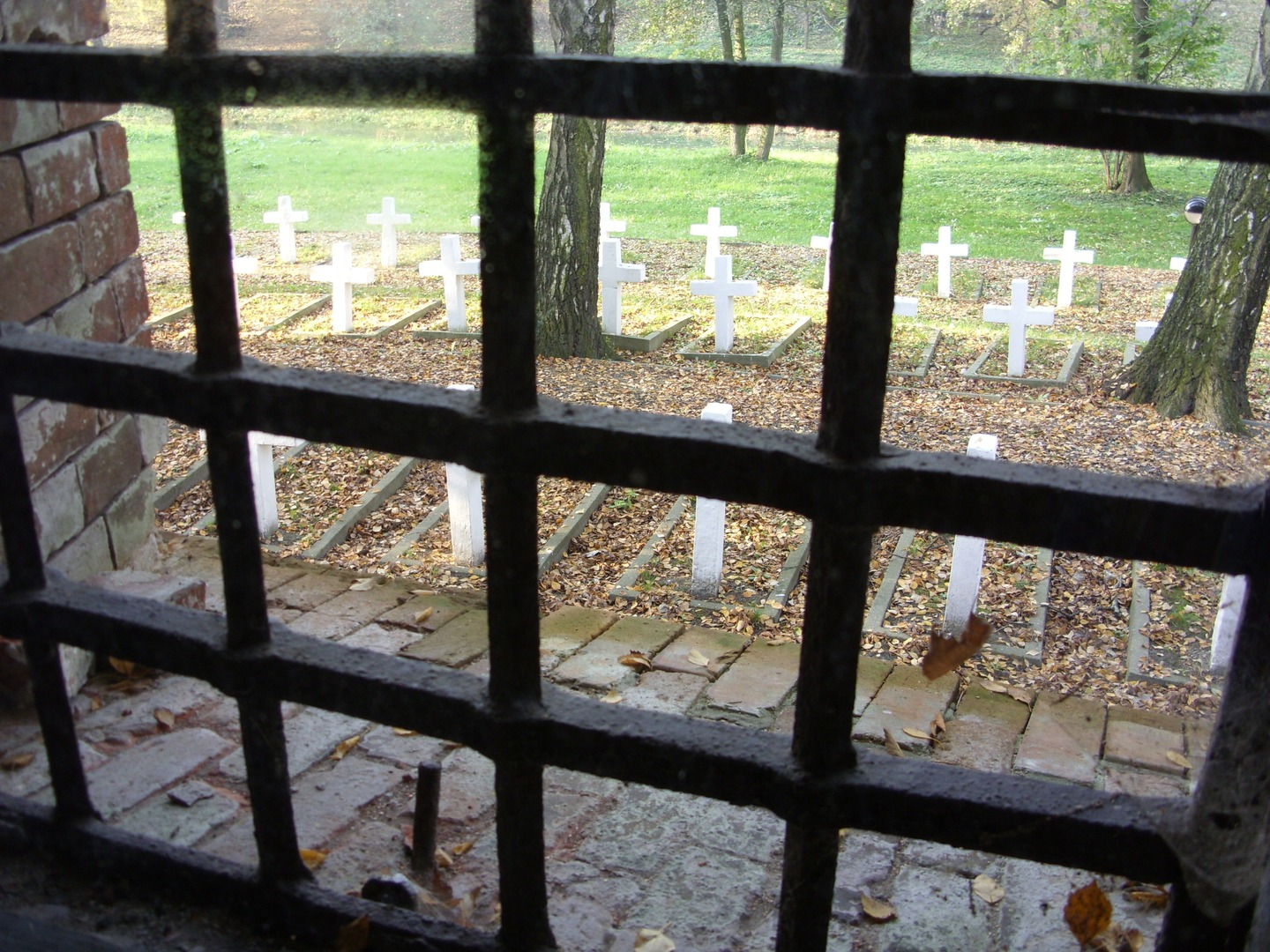
A view from the camp's window to the cemetery in the Rotunda of Zamosc

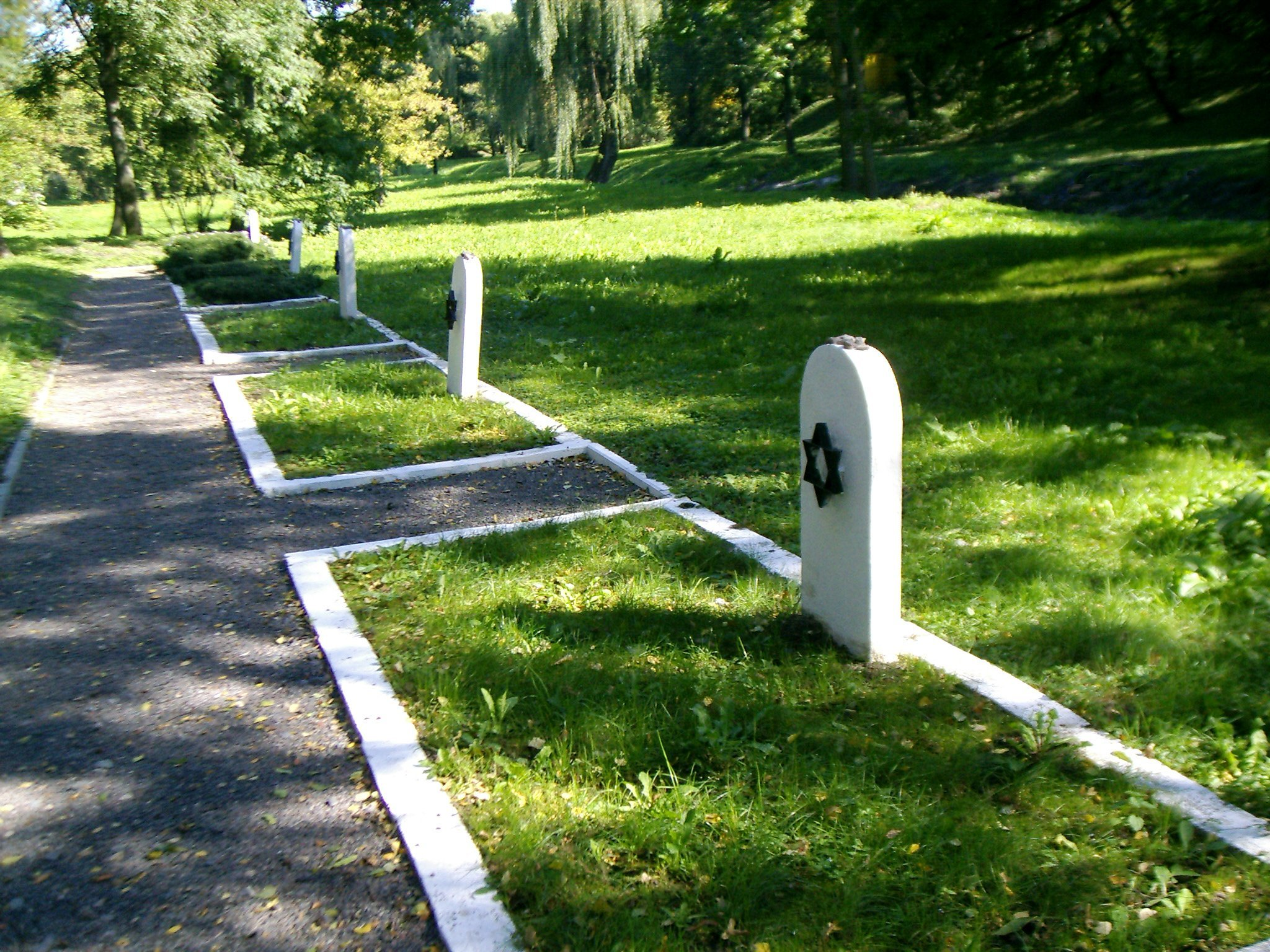
Quarter of Jewish Victims

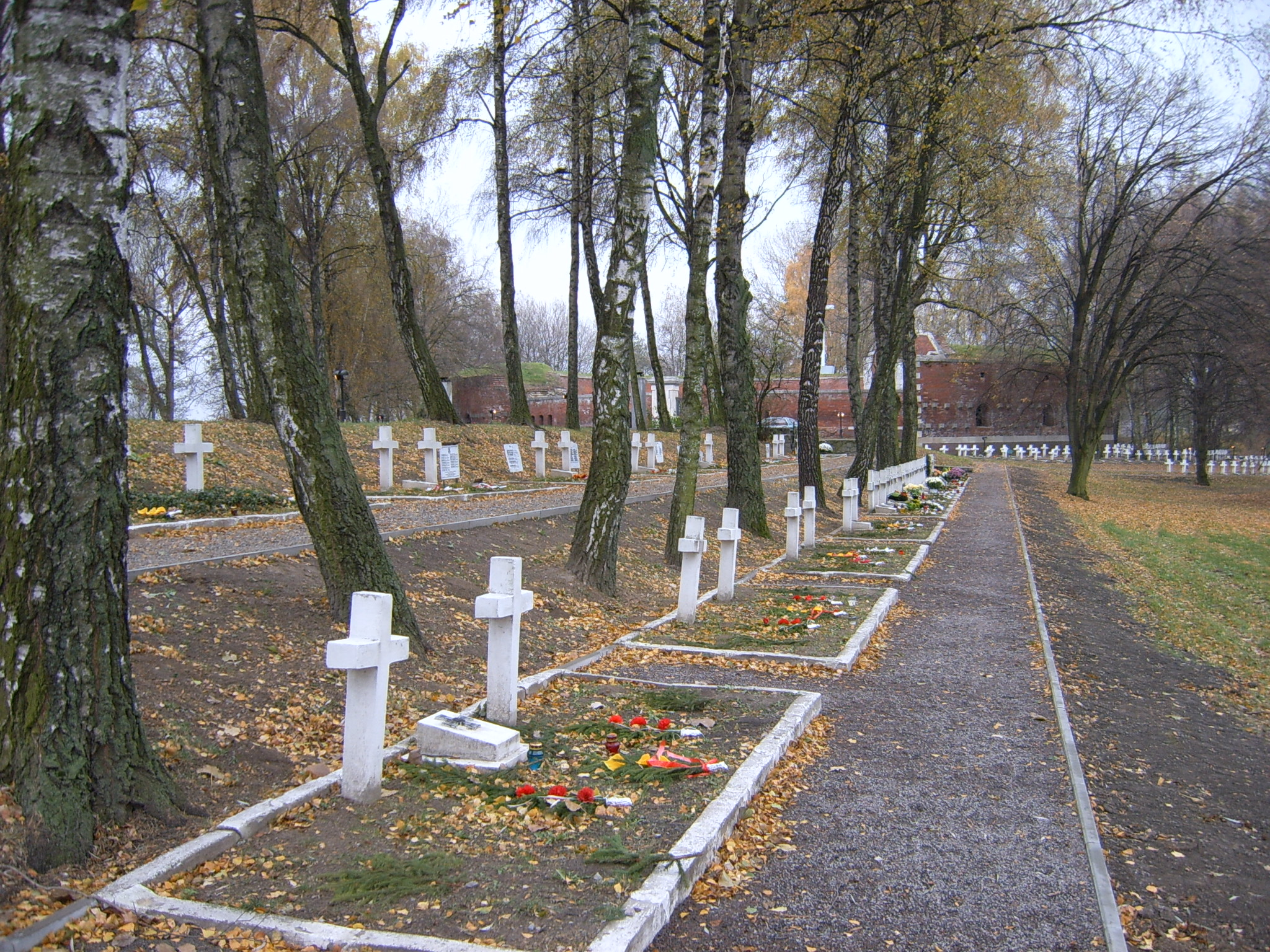
Quarter of Soldiers of the Polish Army killed in September 1939 in Invasion of Poland

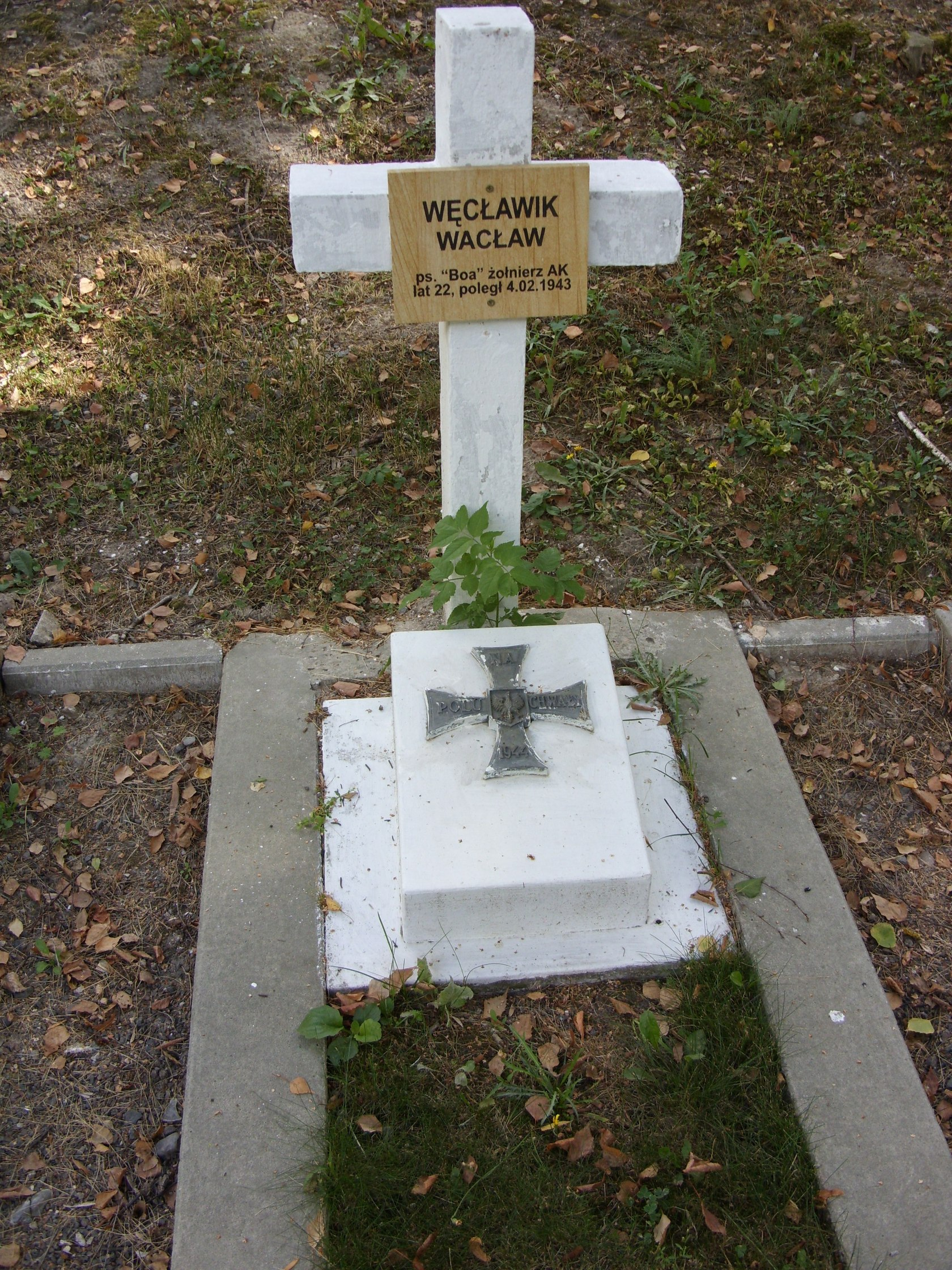
Węcławik Wacław 22 years old soldier of Home Army

== See also ==
- Home Army
- Ethnic cleansing of Zamojszczyzna by Nazi Germany
- Expulsion of Poles by Nazi Germany
- Forced labour under German rule during World War II
- German AB-Aktion in Poland
- General Government
- German camps in occupied Poland during World War II
- History of Zamość
- Intelligenzaktion
- Invasion of Poland
- Museum of Zamość
- Nazi crimes against the Polish nation
- Occupation of Poland (1939–1945)
- War crimes in occupied Poland during World War II
