= Gmina Wojaszówka =

Gmina Wojaszówka Wojaszówka Commune
- Gmina
- Flag Coat of arms
- Interactive map of Gmina Wojaszówka
- Coordinates (Wojaszówka): 49°47′N 21°41′E
- Country: Poland
- Voivodeship: Subcarpathian
- County: Krosno County
- Seat: Wojaszówka

Area
  - Total: 83.4 km^{2} (32.2 sq mi)

Population (2006)
  - Total: 9,102
  - Density: 109/km^{2} (283/sq mi)
- Website: http://www.wojaszowka.pl

Gmina Wojaszówka is a rural gmina (administrative district) in Krosno County, Subcarpathian Voivodeship, in south-eastern Poland. Its seat is the village of Wojaszówka, which lies approximately 13 kilometres (8 mi) north-west of Krosno and 37 km (23 mi) south-west of the regional capital Rzeszów.

The gmina covers an area of 83.4 square kilometres (32.2 sq mi), and as of 2006 its total population is 9,102.

The gmina contains part of the protected area called Czarnorzeki-Strzyżów Landscape Park.

== Villages ==
Gmina Wojaszówka contains the villages and settlements of Bajdy, Bratkówka, Łączki Jagiellońskie, Łęki Strzyżowskie, Odrzykoń, Pietrusza Wola, Przybówka, Rzepnik, Ustrobna, Wojaszówka and Wojkówka.

== Neighbouring gminas ==
Gmina Wojaszówka is bordered by the city of Krosno and by the gminas of Frysztak, Jasło, Jedlicze, Korczyna, Strzyżów and Wiśniowa.
