= Łęki Strzyżowskie =

- Village
- Location within Poland
- Coordinates: 49°48′32″N 21°39′39″E
- Country: Poland
- Voivodeship: Subcarpathian
- County: Krosno
- Gmina: Wojaszówka
- Population: 1,100

Łęki Strzyżowskie (Polish pronunciation: [ˈwɛŋkʲi stʂɨˈʐɔfskʲɛ]) is a village in the administrative district of Gmina Wojaszówka, within Krosno County, Subcarpathian Voivodeship, in south-eastern Poland.
