= Franciszek Starowieyski =

Polish artist

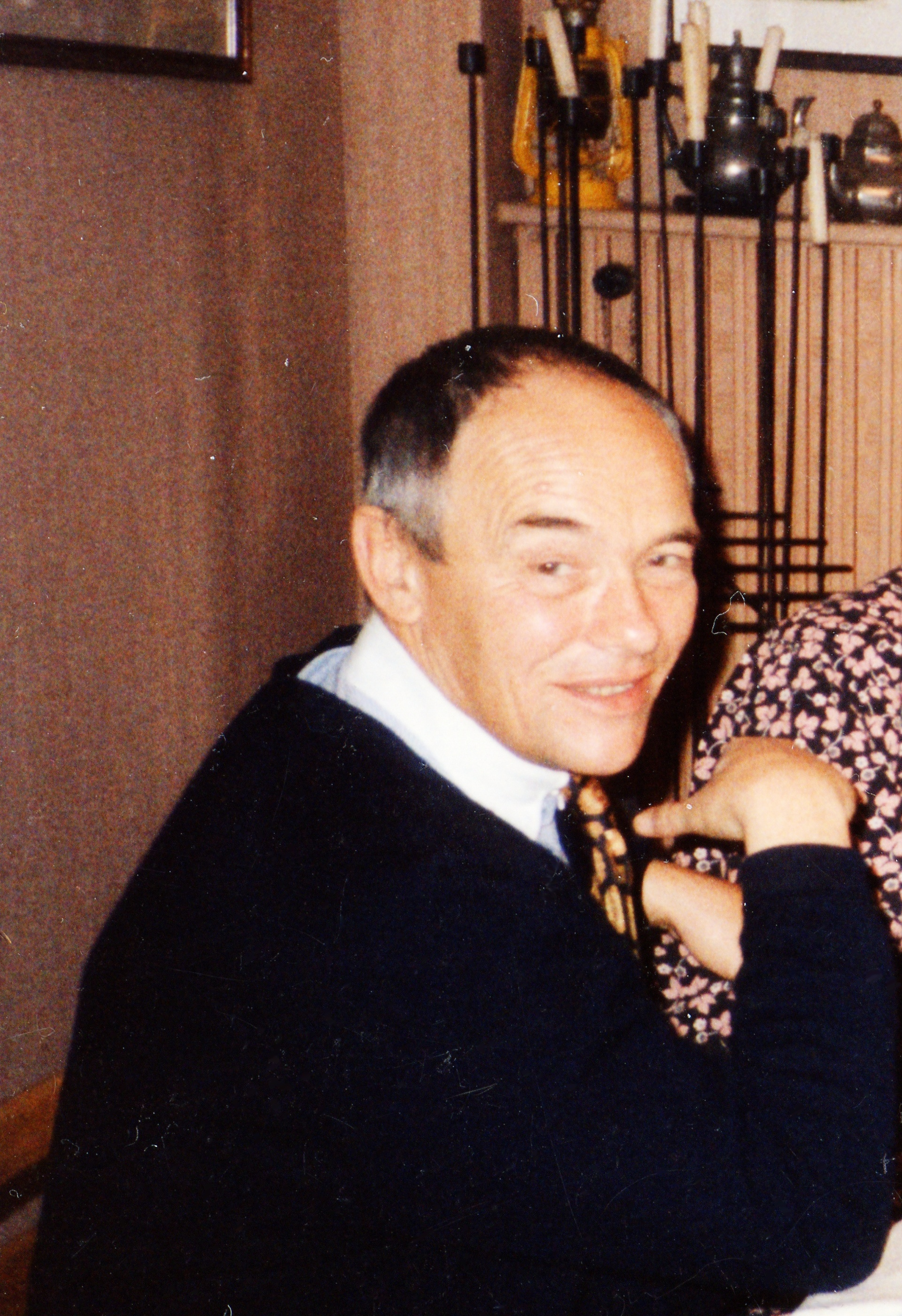
- Starowieyski in November 1990
- Born: Franciszek Andrzej Bobola Biberstein-Starowieyski; 8 July 1930; Bratkówka, Poland
- Died: 23 February 2009 (aged 78); Warsaw, Poland
- Occupation: Graphic designer
- Known for: Poster design

Franciszek Andrzej Bobola Biberstein-Starowieyski (8 July 1930 in Bratkówka – 23 February 2009 in Warsaw) was a Polish artist. From 1949 to 1955, he studied at the Academy of Fine Arts in Kraków and Warsaw. He specialized in poster, drawing, painting, stage designing, and book illustration. He was a member of Alliance Graphique International (AGI). Throughout his career his style deviated from the socialist realism that was prevalent during the start of his career and the popular, brightly colored Cyrk posters; however he did create one Cyrk poster Homage to Picasso in 1966.

He was the first Polish artist to have a one-man show at the Museum of Modern Art (MoMA) in New York, in 1986.

== Major awards ==
- 1973 - Award, International Biennale of the Arts, São Paulo (Brazil)
- 1974 - Film poster award, Cannes Film Festival, Cannes (France)
- 1974 - 2nd Prize, International Biennial of Posters, Warsaw (Poland)
- 1978 - 2nd Prize, International Biennial of Posters, Warsaw (Poland)
- 1979 - Gold Plaque, International Film Festival, Chicago (USA)
- 1982 - Silver Hugo, Film poster competition
- 2000 - 3rd Prize, International Biennial of Posters, Warsaw (Poland)

Movie poster for Jean-Luc Godard's 'A Woman is a Woman'

== Major exhibitions ==
- 1986 – The Museum of Modern Art, New York (USA)
- 2014 - Panstwowa Galeria Sztuki, Sopot (Pol.) "Franciszek Starowieyski Przyjaznie Paryskie 1683-1693", Kolekeja Nelson et Alin Avila

== Books ==
- 1984

"F.s Franciszek Strarowieyski posters 1973/1984", edited by Area

- 1993

"F.s 1690 Franciszek Starowieyski", lithography, edited by Area

- 1994

"Mélange n°7", lithography, edited by Area

- 2014

"Franciszek Starowieyski Przyjaznie Paryskie 1683-1693", edited by Panstwowa Galeria Sztuki, by Alin Avila. ISBN 978-83-61270-81-2

- 2017

Nombreuses affiches de Franciszek Starowieyski sur lesaffiches.com

== See also ==
- List of graphic designers
- List of Polish painters
- List of Polish graphic designers
- Graphic design
