= Wojaszówka =

- Village
- Location within Poland
- Coordinates: 49°47′N 21°41′E
- Country: Poland
- Voivodeship: Subcarpathian
- County: Krosno
- Gmina: Wojaszówka
- Population: 700

Wojaszówka [vɔjaˈʂufksa] is a village in Krosno County, Subcarpathian Voivodeship, in south-eastern Poland. It is the seat of the gmina (administrative district) called Gmina Wojaszówka.
