= Przybówka =

- Village
- Location within Poland
- Coordinates: 49°47′25″N 21°38′41″E
- Country: Poland
- Voivodeship: Subcarpathian
- County: Krosno
- Gmina: Wojaszówka
- Population: 830

Przybówka [pʂɨˈbufka] is a village in the administrative district of Gmina Wojaszówka, within Krosno County, Subcarpathian Voivodeship, in south-eastern Poland.
