= Bajdy, Podkarpackie Voivodeship =

Bajdy
- Village
- Location within Poland
- Coordinates: 49°46′N 21°40′E
- Country: Poland
- Voivodeship: Subcarpathian
- County: Krosno
- Gmina: Wojaszówka

Bajdy [ˈbai̯dɨ] is a village in the administrative district of Gmina Wojaszówka, within Krosno County, Subcarpathian Voivodeship, in south-eastern Poland.

Its registered population as of March 2021 census is 701.
