= Ustrobna =

- Village
- Location within Poland
- Coordinates: 49°45′N 21°42′E
- Country: Poland
- Voivodeship: Subcarpathian
- County: Krosno
- Gmina: Wojaszówka
- Population: 1,143

Ustrobna [usˈtrɔbna] is a village in the administrative district of Gmina Wojaszówka, within Krosno County, Subcarpathian Voivodeship, in south-eastern Poland.
