= History of Zamość =

Zamość, founded in 1580, is a town in Poland.

== Renaissance town ==
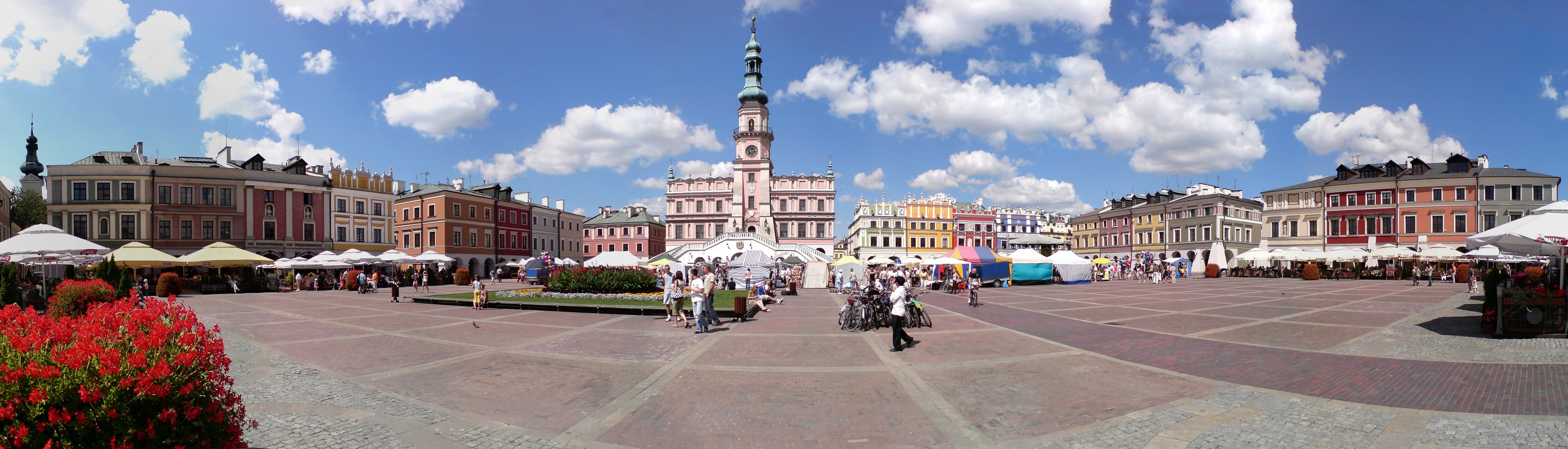
Zamosc Great Market Panorama

Zamość was founded in 1580 by the Chancellor and Hetman (head of the army of the Polish–Lithuanian Commonwealth) Jan Zamoyski, on the trade route linking western and northern Europe with the Black Sea.

Because of the merger of the fortress and the main city, and the terrain, the fortress was an irregular heptagon, consisting of 7 curtains and 7 bastions placed in the bends. Jan Zamoyski was the founder and owner of the city. The city was founded in areas that were threatened or attacked by the Tatars. In the case of emergency, the fortress could shelter people fleeing threatened areas.

The news about the privileges and the benefits for the settlers made other people to come to the city. Firstly, the privileges were only for the Catholics who settled down in Zamość, however it caused the lack of the newcomers. It wasn't what Zamoyski was hoping for. In order to change that situation in the city on 30 April 1585 Armenians got the permission to settle down in Zamość. The other documents from 26 February 1588 and 10th 1589 also enabled Sephardic Jews and Greeks to settle in the city. The Sephardic Jews got the privilege to live on Szewska street and to build a synagogue. Around 1590–1591 the first Scottish immigrant obtained citizenship in Zamość, and by the mid-17th century, the Scottish community had grown to 25 permanent residents, and 25 to 30 temporary residents, including students of the Zamoyski Academy.

Following the First Partition of Poland, in 1772, the city was annexed by Austria and included within the newly formed Crown Province of Galicia. Following the Austro-Polish War of 1809 the city was incorporated to the short-lived Polish Duchy of Warsaw. The 17th Polish Infantry Regiment was formed in Zamość in 1809.

== Zamość Academy ==
Zamość Academy was established in 1594 by Jan Zamoyski in Zamość. The intention of its founder was to prepare the aristocratic youth for the public duty, basing on the popular school of Jan Sturm in Strasburg. It was also to be the new center of educational life and the Polish and catholic culture on the eastern areas of the Republic of Poland, being at the same time the main connection of the Polish thought with the West. Officially it was opened on 15 March 1595. The academy was the first private school and the 3rd Academy in the Republic of Poland. The edifice of the academy was quadrangular with a yard. It was built between 1639 and 1648 thanks to the foundation of Chancellor Tomasz Zamoyski and the designer Jan Jaroszewicz. This early Baroque building, planned regularly and symmetrically is an outstanding achievement in the field of architecture in the 17th century. Between 1752 and 1765 the edifice of the academy was reconstructed. It imitated the style of late Baroque and Rococo. Jan Andrzej Bem designed it. The difference was that he removed the attics and built an uptown, mansard roof. The look of the academy changed in the first half of the 19th century, when the decorative mantelpieces, portals, window framings, decorative panels were removed and the arcades on the Town Hall were walled up. However, the characteristic forms of almost identical sizes on each side and the internal yard were preserved.

== Renaissance tenement houses ==
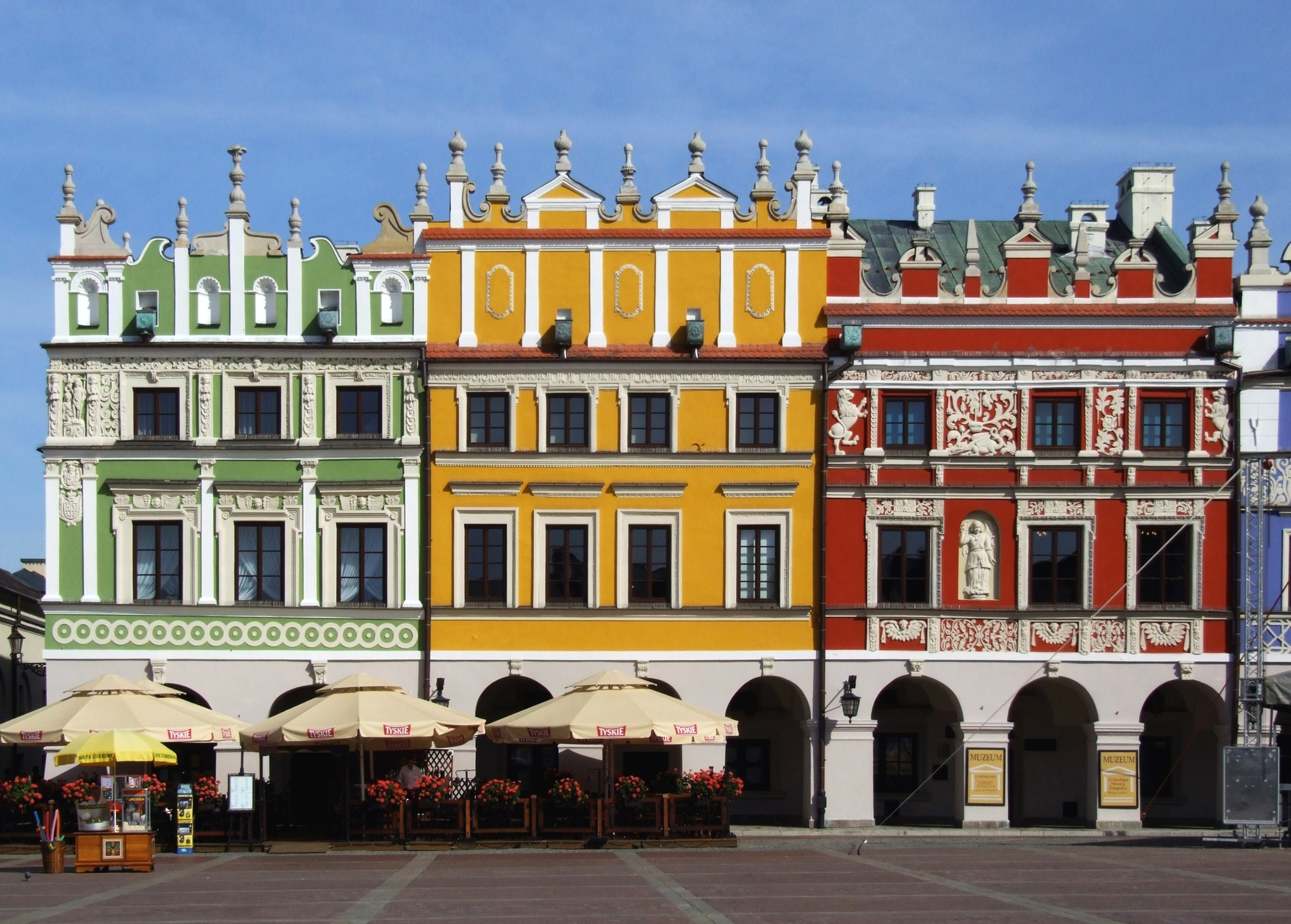
Renaissances houses in Zamość

The tenement houses with the arcades are the most characteristic features of architecture of Zamość, which is also called the City of Arcades. Up to 55 tenement houses were preserved in Zamość. This is the biggest number of that kind of buildings in Poland. The arcades were introduced by the main designer of the city Bernardo Morando. They are present not only on the market square, but also in the cathedral. The arcades have a decorative role there. Morando also established the general design of the tenement house. Apart from arcades, attics and wide, horizontal frieze under the windows on the first floor were obligatory. There had to be a courtyard with the access from the street behind the tenement house. The sophisticated shapes, lace attics, friezes, decorative windows, sculptures and the variety of colours of the Renaissance tenement houses are the pride of the citizens of Zamość and they amuse the tourists from around the world. Each of the Great Market Square's sides is composed of 8 buildings. The tenement house with stuccoed decoration, which presents dragons, angels and oriental, floral and animal motifs was built on the right side of the Town Hall by the Armenian merchants, who were brought by Jan Zamoyski 5 years after having started the construction of the city. The Wilczek House is the closest to the Town Hall. It adjoins Rudomicz House, where the chancellor of the Zamoyski Academy, Bazyli Rudomicz lived. The next tenement house belonged to the Armenian merchant, Gabriel Bartoszewicz and until today it is called Under the Angel House, because the Archengel Gabriel embellishes the façade in a form of a bas-relief. The names of these buildings are derived from the ornaments places on the façades of the tenement houses. Next 4 buildings were built by Armenians as well. The last tenement house of the east wall of the Great Market has an extraordinary history. It is called Rektorska Pharmacy, which was built by a pharmacist. The building had many owners and each of them was a pharmacist. In front of the town hall, on the south wall of the building there are four houses: Paul House, Kinast House, Bern House and the Telanowska House built by Morando for his countryman. The west side starts with the two Greek Houses. On the left side of the Town Hall there are two tenant houses with the arcades, which gained their common façade in the 19th century.

== History of Jews in Zamość ==
In 1827 2,874 Jews lived in the city. In 1900, the Jewish population was 7,034.

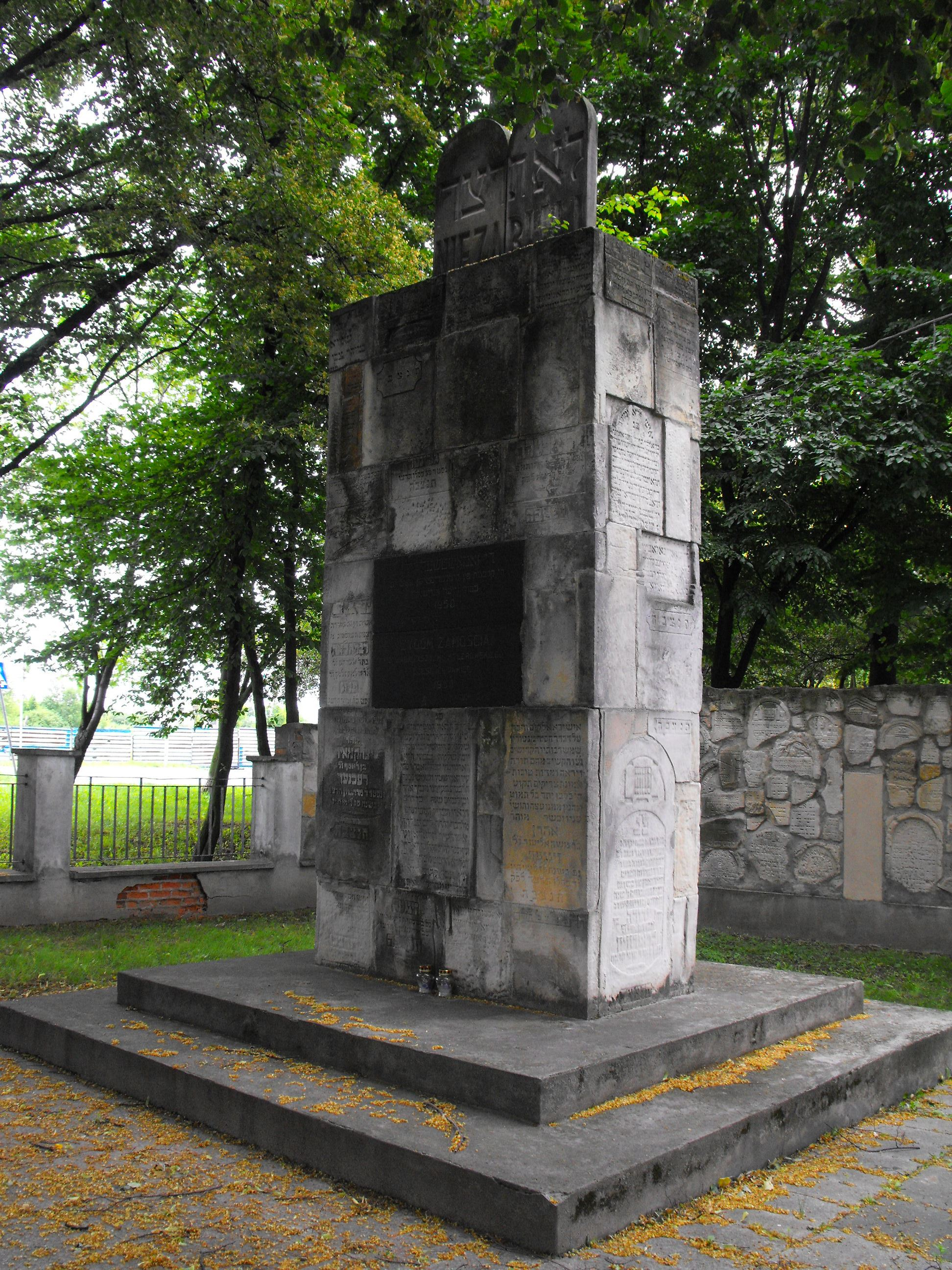
Monument to Jews of Zamość who were murdered in the Holocaust

Zamość was the hometown of poet Solomon Ettinger (1799–1855), writer Isaac Leib Peretz (1852–1915), and political activist Rosa Luxemburg (1870–1919).

Before the outbreak of World War II, more than 12,500 Jews lived in Zamość, accounting for 43 percent of its population. In October 1939, the German occupants set up the Judenrat and in the spring of 1942 they set up a ghetto. The secret Polish Council to Aid Jews "Żegota", established by the Polish resistance movement operated in the city. From April to September 1942, around 4,000 Jews were deported to the Bełżec extermination camp.

In October 1942, the Nazis shot 500 Jews, and the remaining 4,000 Jews were deported, via the transfer point in the Izbica Ghetto, to the extermination camp in Bełżec. These Jews were transported in unheated, closed freight train compartments, without any food or water. Although the distance was relatively short, the journey frequently lasted days, and many died en route.

== World War II ==
In early September 1939, during the German invasion of Poland which started World War II, the Polish government evacuated a portion of the Polish gold reserve from Warsaw to Zamość, and then further southeast to Śniatyn at the Poland-Romania border, from where it was eventually transported via Romania and Turkey to territory controlled by Polish-allied France. During the invasion Zamość was seized by the German army. Shortly, the Nazis created an extermination camp in the Zamość Rotunda where more than 8,000 people were killed, including displaced residents of the Zamość region and Soviet prisoners of war.

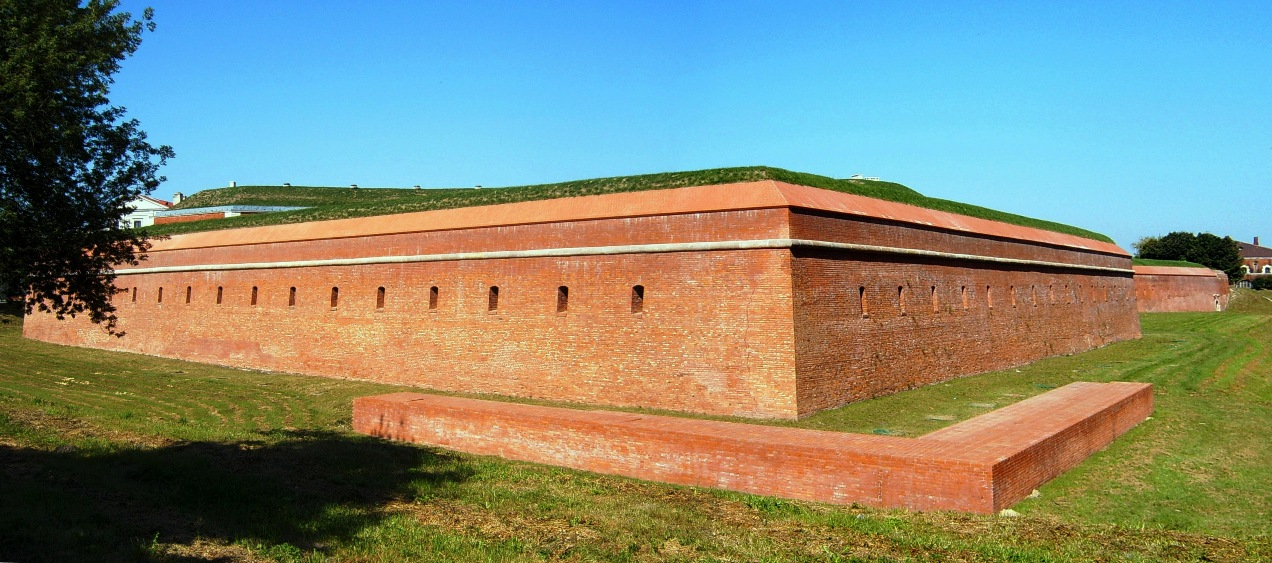
7th Bastion of the Fortress - The only fully preserved bastion

In 1942, Zamość County, due to its fertile black soil, was chosen for further German colonization in the General Government as part of Generalplan Ost. The city itself was initially to be renamed "Himmlerstadt" (Himmler City), later changed to "Pflugstadt" (Plough City). Reichsfuhrer Himmler visited Zamość in August 1942 and ordered that the buildings of the old city be demolished immediately and replaced by a "German town". The local German administrator, more sympathetic towards the town's Renaissance architecture, played for time by requesting what sort of German architecture was required. Teams of planners and architects had not reached a decision when the Germans were evicted by the Red Army.

The German occupiers had planned the relocation of at least 60,000 ethnic Germans in the area before the end of 1943. Before that, a "test trial" expulsion was performed in November 1941, and the whole operation ended in a pacification operation, combined with expulsions in June/July 1943 which was code named Wehrwolf Action I and II. Around 110,000 people from 297 villages were expelled. Around 30,000 victims were children who, if racially "clean" (i.e. had physical characteristics deemed "Germanic") were kidnapped and planned for Germanisation in German families in the Third Reich. Most of the people expelled were sent as slave labour in Germany or to concentration camps.

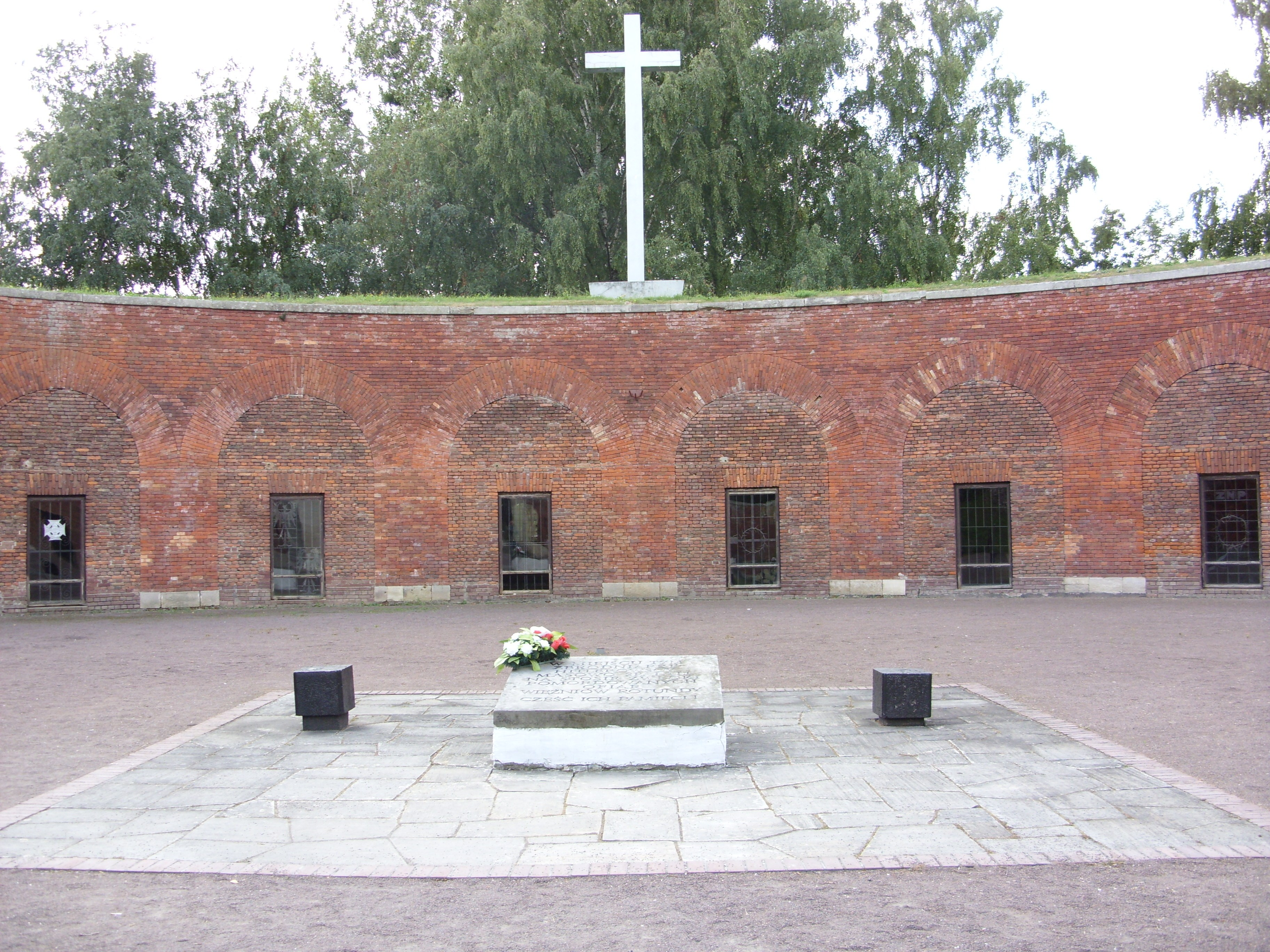
Rotunda Zamość, Gestapo camp, place of martyrdom of the population of the Zamość region in 1940–1944

Local people resisted the action with great determination; they escaped into forests, organised self-defence, helped people who were expelled, and bribed kidnapped children out of German hands. Until the middle of 1943, the Germans managed to settle 80,000 colonists, the number increased by a couple of thousand more in 1944. This settlement was met with fierce armed resistance by Polish Underground forces (see Zamość Uprising). The Nazis found it difficult to find many families suitable for Germanization and so settlement, and that those settlers they did find often fled in fear, because those evicted would burn down houses or kill their inhabitants.

The former President of Germany Horst Köhler was born to a family of German colonists in Skierbieszów.

== After the war ==
During the years 1975–1998 Zamość was the capital of Zamość Voivodeship.

== Bibliography ==
- Herbst, Stanisław. Zamość. Budownictwo i Architektura, 1954.
- Kędziora, Andrzej. Encyklopedia miasta Zamościa. Wyd. 2, JN Profil i GREENart Jacek Kardasz, 2012.
- Kozakiewicz, Helena, Stefan. Renesans w Polsce. Arkady 1984.
- Ostrowski, Wacław. Wprowadzenie do historii budowy miast. Warszawa 2001.
- Pawlicki, Bonawentura Maciej. Kamienice mieszczańskie Zamościa : problemy ochrony. Kraków 1999.
- Słodczyk, Janusz. Historia planowania i budowy miast. Opole 2012.
- Tołwiński, Tadeusz. Urbanistyka tom 1 - budowa miasta w przeszłości. Wyd. 3, Wydawnictwo Ministerstwa Odbudowy nr 11, 1948.
- Witusik, Adam Andrzej. O Zamoyskich, Zamościu i akademii zamojskiej. Lublin 1978.
