= Bratkówka =

- Village
- Location within Poland
- Coordinates: 49°46′N 21°43′E
- Country: Poland
- Voivodeship: Subcarpathian
- County: Krosno
- Gmina: Wojaszówka
- Population: 700

Bratkówka [bratˈkufka] is a village in the administrative district of Gmina Wojaszówka, within Krosno County, Subcarpathian Voivodeship, in south-eastern Poland.
