= Kitów massacre =

Nazi war crime in Kitow, Poland

- Part of Occupation of Poland (1939–1945)
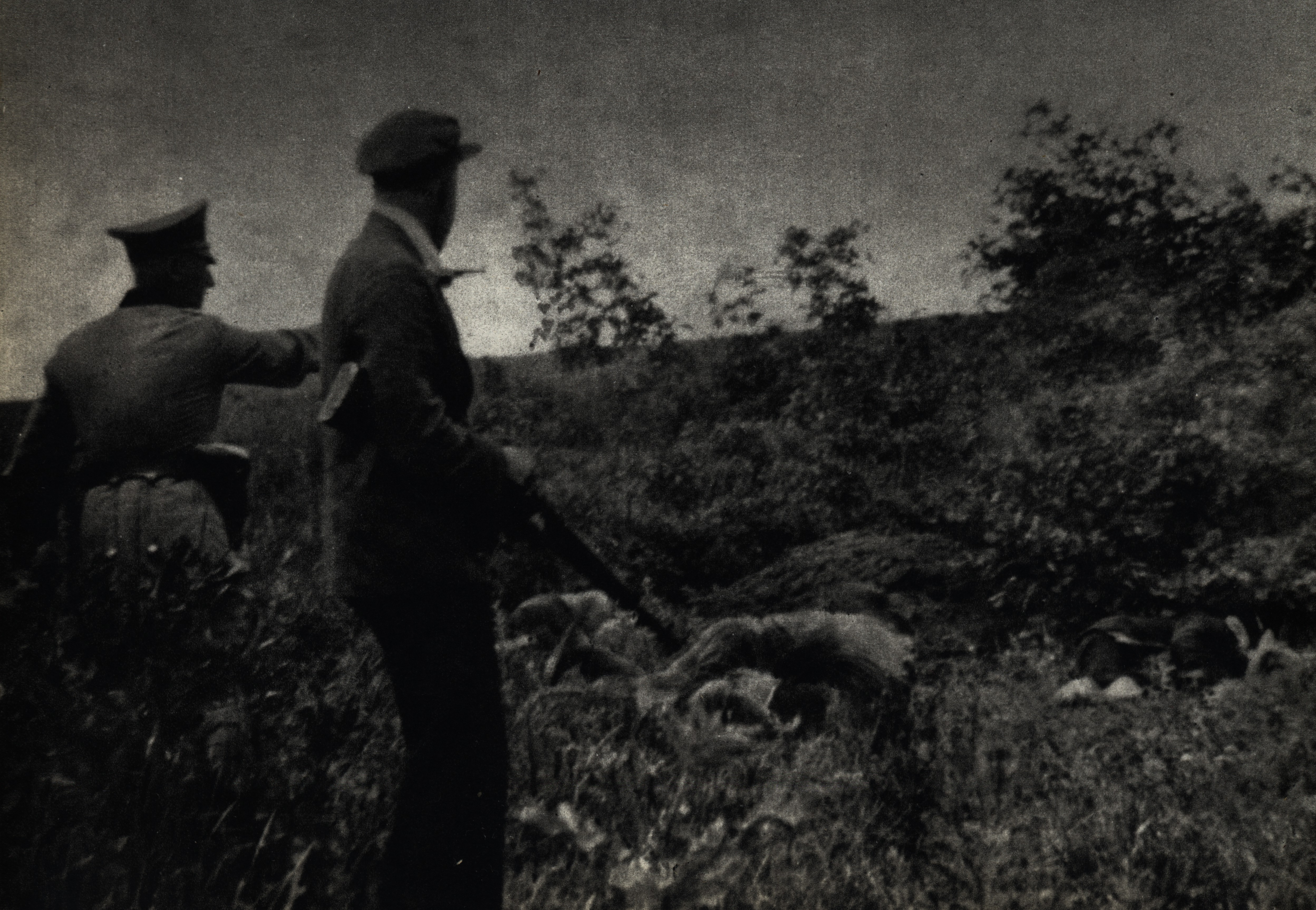
- Execution of Polish peasants by Nazis
- Location: 50°47′37″N 22°56′25″E; Kitów, Poland
- Date: December 11, 1942
- Target: Village inhabitants
- Attack type: War crime
- Deaths: 164
- Perpetrators: Ordnungspolizei, Schutzstaffel

The Kitów massacre was a Nazi war crime perpetrated by the Ordnungspolizei and Schutzstaffel in the village of Kitów within occupied Poland. On December 11, 1942, a minimum of 164 inhabitants of Kitów, including numerous women and children, were killed in a mass execution. This massacre was part of the ethnic cleansing of the Zamość region and was additionally considered retaliation for a prior attack by Polish partisans on the village of Nawóz, which had been subjected to colonization by ethnic German settlers.

== Background ==
In the autumn of 1942, at the direction of SS-Brigadeführer Odilo Globocnik, SS and Police Leader in the Lublin district of the General Government, a significant Nazi displacement operation commenced in the Zamość region. Its aim was to remove around 100,000 Poles from this area and replace them with German settlers, primarily comprising ethnic Germans from various European countries. The initial displacements began on the night of November 27-28, 1942, extending to 60 villages housing approximately 34,000 individuals by the end of December.

The Nazi actions faced passive resistance from the displaced populace and armed responses from the Polish resistance movement. Partisan units from the Peasant Battalions (Bataliony Chłopskie), Home Army (Armia Krajowa), and communist People's Guard (Gwardia Ludowa) attempted to impede pacification and displacement efforts, targeting German police, economic sites, and transportation facilities. They also conducted retaliatory actions in villages settled by German colonists.

One of the villages impacted by the displacement operation was Nawóz. On December 9, 1942, the entire Polish population was expelled and replaced by ethnic Germans from Bessarabia. During the night of December 10-11, partisans from the Peasant Battalions and Home Army jointly attacked Nawóz. According to one account, the partisans only fired warning shots and burned a single farm. However, other sources suggest that at least a few settlers were killed, and anywhere from several to a dozen farms were set ablaze. In response to this partisan assault, the German authorities decided to pacify Kitów, a Polish village situated a few kilometers away from Nawóz.

== The massacre ==
The residents of Kitów were forewarned by the village head (sołtys) that German forces were due to arrive on December 11 regarding undelivered food contingents. Upon learning of the anticipated arrival, several men departed the village. Among them were twelve armed members of the local Home Army outpost who feared their presence might provoke German reprisals against the civilian population. Conversely, families who had fulfilled their food supply obligations awaited the Nazis' arrival without significant apprehension.

The first Germans arrived in Kitów around noon, initially displaying a rather amiable demeanor. They ate a lunch in the village. Some even advised residents to flee; among those who received such a warning was the sołtys's daughter. However, their behavior drastically changed in the afternoon. The village was swiftly surrounded, and an extensive search commenced. Between a dozen to twenty Poles were killed on their farms. Witnesses noted that armed settlers from Nawóz were particularly brutal. Among those killed during this phase of pacification were members of the Blej family, who had previously been displaced by the Nazis from Greater Poland. After the war, Josef Scharenberg, a member of the 25th SS Police Regiment, testified about his involvement in the execution of the Blej family.

We encountered an entire family of five who spoke German. They were Polish evacuees from Poznań. We hesitated in following the order and sought guidance from our group commander, Sergeant Höfner. Only after his insistence did we proceed. We ordered the family to lie on the ground and opened fire. I personally fired at an 18-19-year-old girl and a 12-year-old child. I felt very sorry.

After a period of time, the commanding German officer redirected the course of the pacification. The order was given to cease killings at the farms and gather the entire population in a meadow near the village. Those unable to move were killed in their homes. Men, women, and children assembled in the meadow were informed that they are sentenced to death for alleged “bandit activity” and next indiscriminately machine-gunned. Later, a few men from neighbouring villages were brought to the execution site and also killed. Any wounded individuals showing signs of life were finished off by armed German settlers from Nawóz.

Sources vary regarding the count of victims in the pacification. The Register of Places and Facts of Crimes Committed by the Nazi Occupier on Polish Lands in the years 1939–1945 records 164 deaths in Kitów. Other sources mention figures of 165 or 174 victims. At least 75 women, as well as 28 children under 15 years old, were among those killed.

Among the victims, apart from the inhabitants of Kitów, were the Blej family of six from Greater Poland, four individuals from Gruszka Mała, one from Nielisz, and one from Wólka Złojecka. Two injured women survived the massacre by hiding beneath a pile of bodies. Additionally, the Germans spared the sołtys, Marcin Roczeń, instructing him to arrange the burial of the victims.

The perpetrators of the massacre consisted of SS and Ordnungspolizei members supported by armed German settlers. According to one of the participating policemen, the order to murder the Kitów population came from Captain Eder, the commander of the local Landwacht ("Country Guard").

== Aftermath ==
The bodies of the victims were buried the next day in a mass grave dug near the execution site. The burial was performed by the inhabitants of the village of Tworyczów. The victims' property was stolen by German settlers from Nawóz.

The massacre in Kitów was one of the bloodiest pacifications carried out by the German forces during the ethnic cleansing of the Zamość region. The massacre had a loud echo in the Lublin region. It was recorded in the reports of the Polish Underground State, and the Polish underground press also wrote about it.

== Bibliography ==
- Fajkowski, Józef (1972). Wieś w ogniu. Eksterminacja wsi polskiej w okresie okupacji hitlerowskiej [A countryside on fire. The extermination of the Polish villages during the Nazi occupation] (in Polish). Warszawa: Ludowa Spółdzielnia Wydawnicza.
- Fajkowski, Józef; Religa, Jan (1981). Zbrodnie hitlerowskie na wsi polskiej 1939–1945 [Nazi crimes in the Polish countryside 1939–1945] (in Polish). Warszawa: Książka i Wiedza.
- Jaczyńska, Agnieszka (2012). Sonderlaboratorium SS. Zamojszczyzna: "pierwszy obszar osiedleńczy" w Generalnym Gubernatorstwie [SS' special laboratory. Zamość region: a "first settlement territory" in the General Government] (in Polish). Lublin: Instytut Pamięci Narodowej – Komisja Ścigania Zbrodni przeciwko Narodowi Polskiemu. Oddział w Lublinie. ISBN 978-83-7629-383-7.
- Jankowski, Andrzej (2009). "Wieś polska na ziemiach okupowanych przez Niemców w czasie II wojny światowej w postępowaniach karnych organów wymiaru sprawiedliwości Republiki Federalnej Niemiec" [Polish countryside in the area occupied by Nazis during World War II in the light of penal proceedings of justice administration bodies in the Federal Republic of Germany] (PDF). Studia Muzealno-Historyczne (in Polish). 1. ISSN 2080-2420.
- Madajczyk, Czesław, ed. (1979). Zamojszczyzna – Sonderlaboratorium SS. Zbiór dokumentów polskich i niemieckich z okresu okupacji hitlerowskiej [Zamość region - the SS' special laboratory. Collection of Polish and German documents from the period of Nazi occupation] (in Polish). Vol. I&II. Warszawa: Ludowa Spółdzielnia Wydawnicza.
- Mikoda, Janina, ed. (1994). Rejestr miejsc i faktów zbrodni popełnionych przez okupanta hitlerowskiego na ziemiach polskich w latach 1939–1945. Województwo zamojskie [Register of places and facts of crimes committed by the Nazi Occupier on Polish Lands in the years 1939–1945. Zamość Voivodeship] (in Polish). Warszawa: GKBZHwP-IPN. ISBN 83-903356-0-3.
