= Auschwitz Album =

Photographic record of the Holocaust

The Auschwitz Album
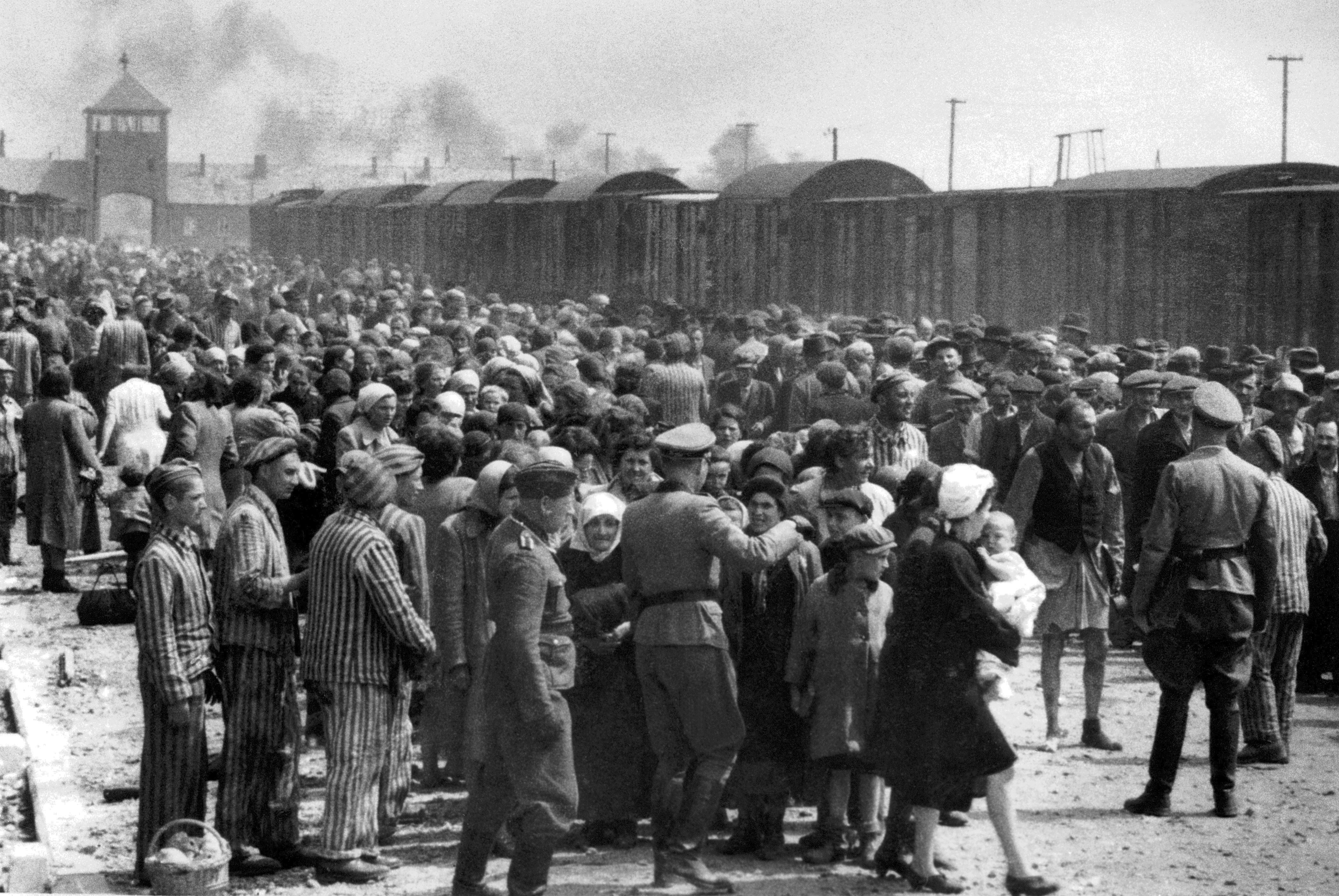
- Hungarian Jews on the Judenrampe (Jewish ramp) after disembarking from the Holocaust trains. Photo from the Auschwitz Album (May 1944)

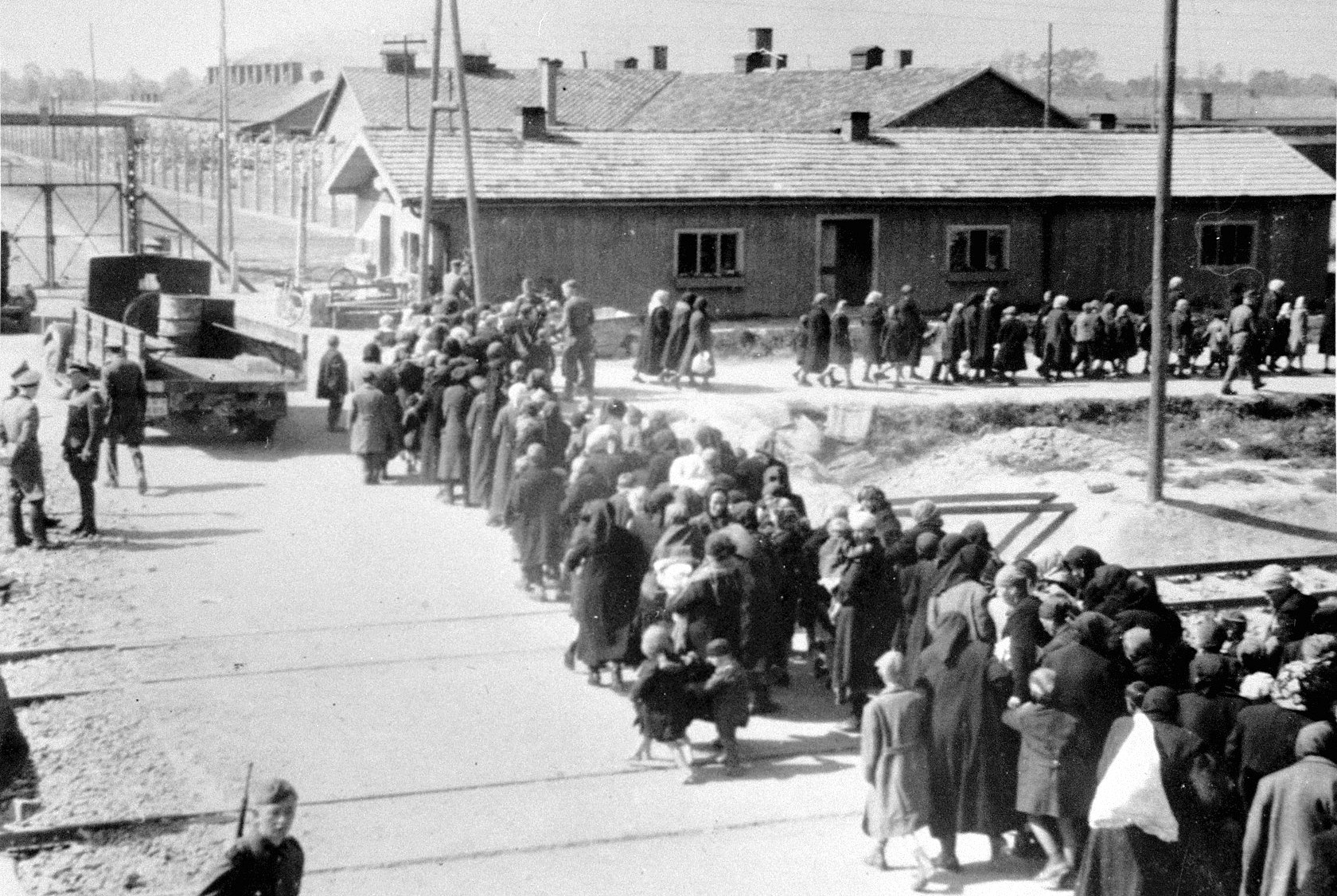
- Jews from the Tét Ghetto walking toward the gas chambers located near crematoria II and III, 27 May 1944. Photograph from the Auschwitz Album

The Auschwitz Album is a photographic record of the Holocaust during the Second World War. It and the Sonderkommando photographs are among the small number of visual documents that show the operations of Auschwitz II-Birkenau, the German extermination camp in occupied Poland.

Originally titled "Resettlement of the Jews from Hungary" (Umsiedlung der Juden aus Ungarn), it shows a period when the Nazis accelerated their deportation of Hungarian Jews to Auschwitz. The images were taken by photographers from the camp's Erkennungsdienst ("identification service"). Among other things, the Erkennungsdienst was responsible for fingerprinting and taking photo IDs of prisoners who had not been selected for extermination. The identity of the photographers is uncertain, but it is thought to have been Bernhard Walter or Ernst Hoffmann, two SS men who were director and deputy director of the Erkennungsdienst. The camp's director, Rudolf Höss, also may have taken several of the photographs himself.

The album has 56 pages and 193 photographs. Originally, it had more photographs, but before being donated to Yad Vashem, the Holocaust museum in Israel, some of them were given to survivors who recognized relatives and friends.

== Description ==
The images follow the processing of newly arrived Hungarian Jews from Carpathian Ruthenia in the spring and summer of 1944. They document the disembarkation of the Jewish prisoners from the train boxcars, followed by the selection process, performed by doctors of the SS and wardens of the camp, which separated those who were considered "fit for work" from those who were to be immediately sent to the gas chambers. The photographers followed groups of those selected for work, and those selected for death, to a birch grove just outside the crematoria, where they were made to wait before being killed. The photographers also documented the workings of the Canada storage facilities, where the looted belongings of the prisoners were sorted before transport to Germany. The photographs are unrepresentative in showing the arrival process during the daytime; the vast majority of transports were timed to arrive at the camp during the night.

== Purpose and intended audience ==
The album was likely produced to show the efficient operations of Auschwitz to an audience of high-level Nazi officials. The goal can be inferred from the album's contents, which focus on the processing of Hungarian Jews upon their arrival at the camp. The photographs were taken at a time when Eichmann accelerated the deportation of Hungarian Jews, with 650,000 people to be transported to Auschwitz in the course of three months. Rudolf Höss had been deployed to Auschwitz in May 1944 to oversee the operation, and the album highlights his management of the arrival process. The album has therefore been interpreted by scholars as an example of "internal propaganda" meant to show the orderly operation of the "Final Solution."

== History ==
The album's survival is remarkable, given the strenuous efforts made by the Nazis to keep the "Final Solution" a secret. Also remarkable is the story of its discovery. Lili Jacob (later Lili Jacob-Zelmanovic Meier) was selected for work at Auschwitz-Birkenau, while the other members of her family were sent to the gas chambers. After the Auschwitz camp was evacuated by the Nazis as the Soviet army approached, Jacob passed through various camps, finally arriving at the Dora concentration camp, where she was eventually liberated. Recovering from illness in a vacated barracks of the SS, Jacob found the album in a cupboard beside her bed. Inside, she found pictures of herself, her relatives, and others from her community. The coincidence was astounding, given that the Nordhausen-Dora camp was over 640 km (400 mi) away, and that over 1.1 million people were killed at Auschwitz.

The album's existence had been known publicly since at least the 1960s, when it was used as evidence at the Frankfurt Auschwitz trials. Nazi-hunter Serge Klarsfeld visited Lili in 1980 and convinced her to donate the album to Yad Vashem. The album's contents were first published that year in the book The Auschwitz Album, edited by Klarsfeld.

== See also ==
- Höcker Album, a collection of photographs of SS who ran the Auschwitz-Birkenau concentration camp
- Sonderkommando photographs, taken at Auschwitz in 1944; possibly by Alberto Errera
- Wilhelm Brasse, prisoner and photographer at Auschwitz

== Bibliography ==
- Hellman, Peter; Meier, Lili; Klarsfeld, Serge (1981). The Auschwitz Album. New York; Toronto: Random House. ISBN 0-394-51932-9.
- Oliver Lustig's Text Presentation of Historic Holocaust Photographs from the Auschwitz Album from Holocaust Survivors and Remembrance Project: "Forget You Not"
