= Auschwitz Erkennungsdienst =

Nazi photography unit

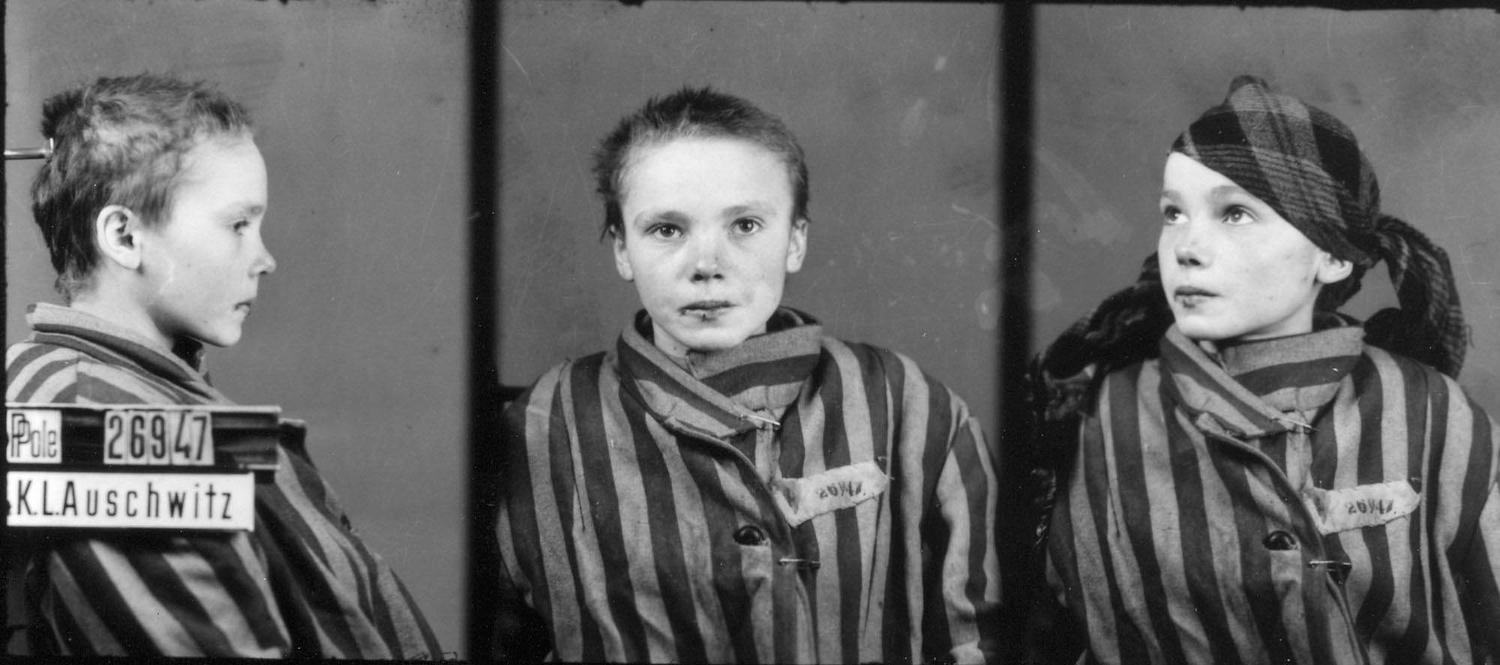
These portrait photographs of inmate Czesława Kwoka (attributed to Wilhelm Brasse) are among thousands taken by the Erkennungsdienst.

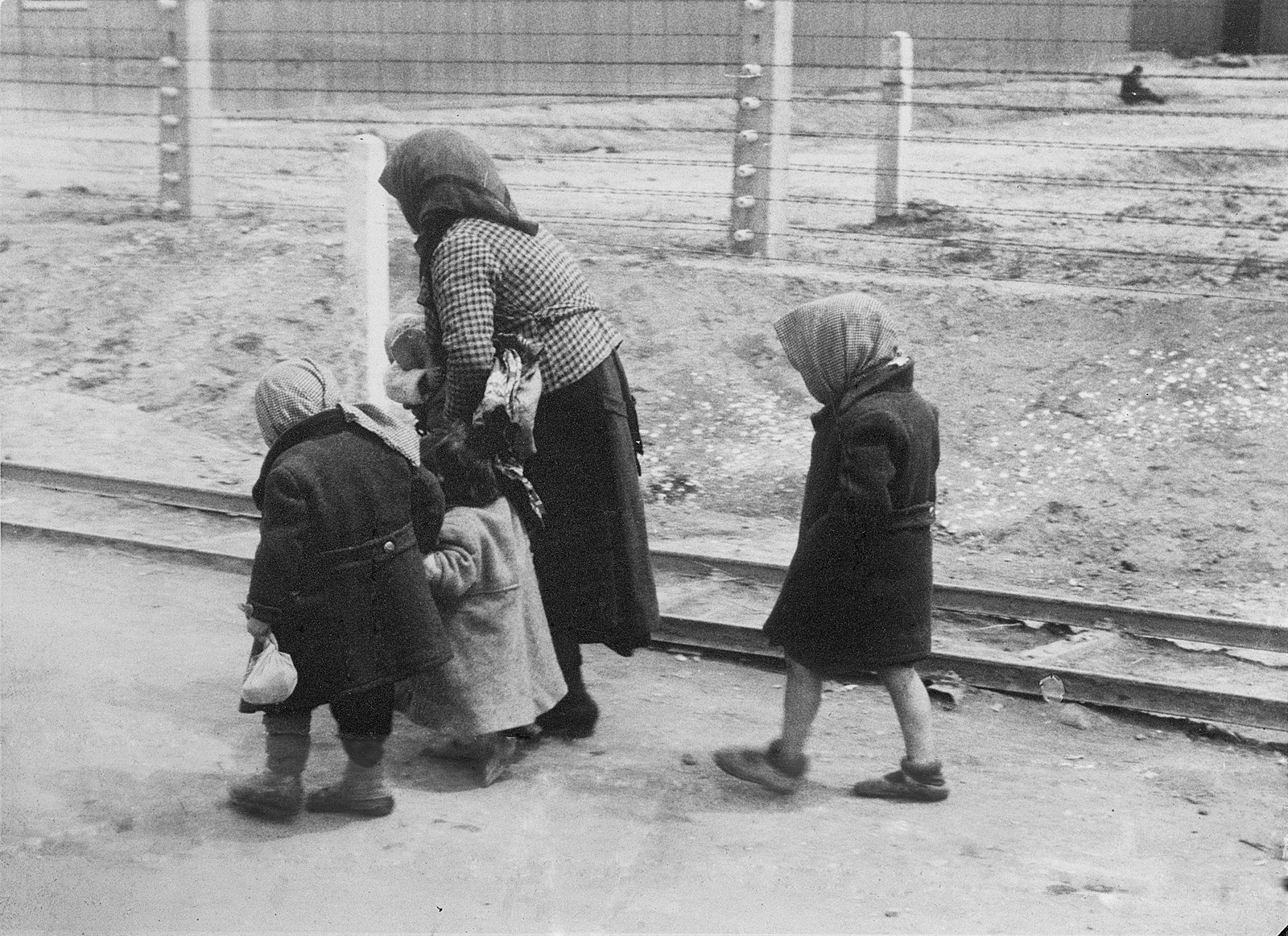
Woman and children walk toward the gas chamber, summer 1944. Part of the Auschwitz Album, taken by the Erkennungsdienst.

In German-occupied Poland during World War II and the Holocaust, the Politische Abteilung Erkennungsdienst ("Political Department Identification Service") in the Auschwitz concentration camp was a kommando of SS officers and prisoners who photographed camp events, visiting dignitaries, and building works on behalf of the camp's commandant, Rudolf Höss.

The Erkennungsdienst also took photographs of inmates, including gassings, experiments, escape attempts, suicides, and portraits of registered prisoners (those not immediately murdered in the gas chambers) when they first arrived at the camp.

Led by its director, SS-Hauptscharführer Bernhard Walter, and deputy director, SS-Unterscharführer Ernst Hofmann, the Erkennungsdienst took the 193 photographs that came to be known as the Auschwitz Album, which included images of Hungarian Jews in the summer of 1944 just before they were gassed.

== Location and staff ==
=== SS staff ===
Established by Rudolf Höss in December 1940 or January 1941, the Erkennungsdienst was based on the ground floor of block 26 in Auschwitz I, where there was a studio and darkroom.

Bernhard Walter was director of the Erkennungsdienst. He was born on 27 April 1911 in Fürth, Bavaria, and joined the SS when he was 22, on 2 May 1933 (serial number 104168). He was assigned to the 2nd Brandenburg Totenkopf regiment at the Sachsenhausen concentration camp, where he worked with Höss and ran the camp's Erkennungsdienst. Transferred to Auschwitz in 1941, he ran the Auschwitz Erkennungsdienst from 1 January 1941 until 18 January 1945. After Auschwitz, he was transferred to the Mittelbau-Dora concentration camp.

Ernst Hofmann became deputy director of the Erkennungsdienst on 16 May 1941. Other staff members included SS-Unterscharführer Alfred Schmidt and SS-Rottenführer Wenzel Leneis.

=== Prisoners ===
Prisoners were assigned to work for the Erkennungsdienst as photographers and darkroom workers. Franz Maltz, a German inmate, was the kapo; he had been the kapo at the Sachsenhausen Erkennungsdienst. Other prisoners included Wilhelm Brasse (prisoner number 3444), Tadeusz Brodka (245), Eugeniusz Dembek (63764), Edward Josefsberg, Bronisław Jureczek (26672), Roman Karwat (5959), Leonid Koren (21953), Tadeusz Krzysica (120557), Tadeusz Myszkowski (593), Zdzisław Pazio (3078), Jozef Pysz (1420), Jozef Swiatloch (3529), Stanisław Tralka (660), Wladyslaw Wawrzyniak (9449), and Alfred Woycicki (39247).

== Photographs ==
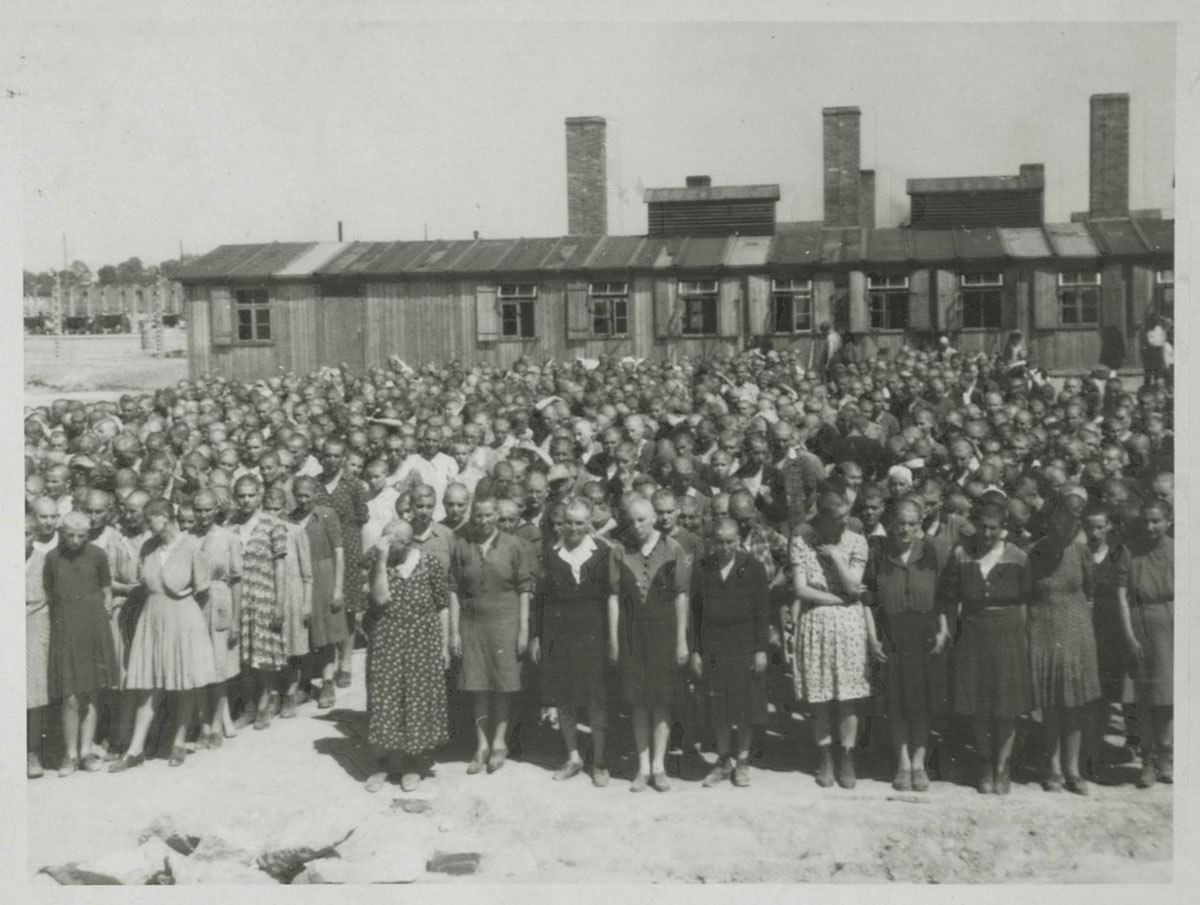
Women's camp, Auschwitz II, summer 1944, a photograph from the Auschwitz Album. Lili Jacob (A10862), who found the album in the Dora concentration camp after liberation, stands fourth left at the front in the right-hand column.

One function of the Erkennungsdienst was to take three photographs of each newly registered prisoner (unregistered prisoners were murdered in the gas chambers on arrival), and to create prisoner identification papers with fingerprints. These details were circulated to the police in the event of an escape. If a prisoner died as a result of an escape attempt or suicide, the Erkennungsdienst took photographs of the body, which were added to the prisoner's file and forwarded to SS-WVHA Office Group D (the Concentration Camps Inspectorate). The Erkennungsdienst also photographed medical experiments and visiting dignitaries.

On 17 and 18 July 1942, Walter or Hofmann photographed Heinrich Himmler, Reichsführer of the SS, during a visit to the camp. It was the second time Himmler had inspected Auschwitz. He watched a gassing in its entirety, from the point of unloading the transport to emptying the gas chamber and burying the victims. He also inspected the Kanada warehouses and the women's camp, where he reportedly asked to see a flogging. At the end of the visit, he promoted Rudolf Höss, the camp commandant, to Obersturmbannführer.

In May 1944, Richard Baer became commandant of Auschwitz, while Höss was promoted to Standortältester (local SS garrison commander). From May to August 1944, for reasons unknown, Walter and Hofmann photographed transports of Jews from their arrival at Auschwitz II to the gas chamber. The 193 photographs became known as the Auschwitz Album. It was used as evidence in the Frankfurt Auschwitz trials (1963–1965), during which Walter testified at first that he had not been the photographer, but eventually he acknowledged having taken some of the images. The album was also used as evidence in the 2015 trial of Oskar Gröning in Lüneburg, Germany.

== Liberation of Auschwitz ==
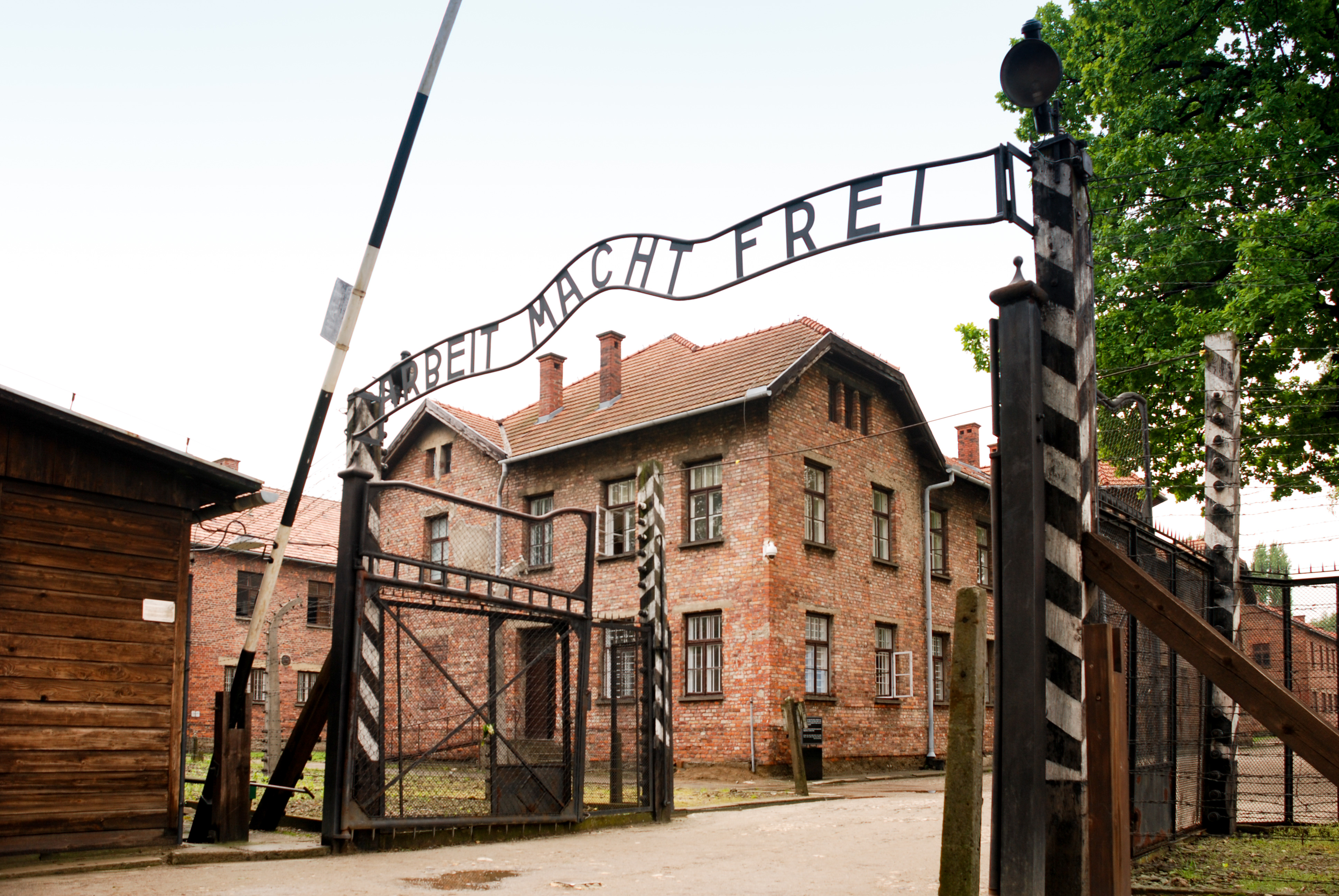
Auschwitz I in 2010

As the Red Army approached Auschwitz from the east in January 1945, the SS ordered that the camp be dismantled and abandoned. Efforts were made to destroy evidence and thousands of inmates were sent on a westwards death march. The Erkennungsdienst was ordered to destroy their photographs, supervised by Walter.

Walter saved the Auschwitz Album photographs and the photographs of Heinrich Himmler. William Brasse, a prisoner who worked for the Erkennungsdienst, said he believed Walter and Hofmann took their images to the Gross-Rosen concentration camp, including film of medical experiments they had recorded for one of the camp doctors, Josef Mengele. Walter ordered Brasse and another prisoner, Bronisław Jureczek, to burn the images of prisoners. Jureczek said:

At the last minute, we were ordered to burn all the negatives and photographs in the Erkennungsdienst. We first put wet photographic paper and photographs into the tile stove in the studio, and then a mass of pictures and negatives. Stuffing such an amount of material into the stove blocked the smoke. As we made the fire, we were sure that only part of the photographs and negatives near the doors of the stove would burn, and that the fire would then go out from lack of air. ... I deliberately ... scattered a certain number of pictures and negatives around the studio to give an impression of haste. I could see that everyone was in too much of a hurry during the evacuation to gather everything up, and that something would be saved.

Before they left the camp on 18 January, Brasse said, they hid the negatives in the studio and boarded the door up behind them. As a result, 38,916 photographs survived. After the camp's liberation, prisoners carried the images in bags to the Polish Red Cross in Cracow, and in 1947 they were added to the archives of the Auschwitz-Birkenau State Museum.

== See also ==
- Höcker Album
- Sonderkommando photographs
- The Portraitist (2005)
