= Ujazdów (disambiguation) =

Ujazdów is a neighbourhood in Śródmieście, Warsaw.

Ujazdów may also refer to:

- Ujazdów Avenue in Warsaw
- Ujazdów Castle in Warsaw
- Ujazdów Park in Warsaw
- Ujazdów, Włodawa County in Lublin Voivodeship (east Poland)
- Ujazdów, Zamość County in Lublin Voivodeship (east Poland)
