= The Portraitist =

- Portrecista (TVP1, Poland, 2005)
- Portrecista
- Written by: Ireneusz (Irek) Dobrowolski
- Directed by: Ireneusz (Irek) Dobrowolski
- Starring: Wilhelm Brasse
- Theme music composer: Agata Steczkowska
- Country of origin: Poland
- Original language: Polish

Production
- Producer: Anna Dobrowolska
- Editor: Ireneusz (Irek) Dobrowolski
- Running time: 52 minutes

Original release
- Network: TVP1, Poland
- Release: 1 January 2006

The Portraitist is a 2005 Polish television documentary film about the life and work of Wilhelm Brasse, the famous "photographer of Auschwitz", made for TVP1, Poland, which first aired in its "Proud to Present" series on January 1, 2006. It also premiered at the Polish Film Festival, at the West London Synagogue, in London, on March 19, 2007.

== Background ==
In August 1940, when he was 23, after fleeing the Nazi occupation of Żywiec, his home town in southern Poland, Wilhelm Brasse was captured at the Polish-Hungarian border and deported to KL Auschwitz-Birkenau, as prisoner number 3444. Trained before the beginning of World War II as a portrait photographer at his aunt's studio, he was ordered by his SS supervisors to photograph "what they told him to photograph: prisoners' work, criminal medical experiments, portraits of the prisoners for the files." Brasse has estimated that he took about 40,000 to 50,000 "identity pictures" from 1940 until 1945, before being forcibly moved to another concentration camp in Austria, where he was liberated by the American forces in May 1945.

While not all of Brasse's photographs are extant, 40,000 that did survive are kept in archives, with some on display, at the Auschwitz-Birkenau State Museum, and at Yad Vashem, the Holocaust Martyrs' and Heroes' Remembrance Authority, Israel's official memorial to the Jewish victims of the Holocaust, and some of the Auschwitz-Birkenau State Museum archival photographs and related iconography are presented visually in the film, with narration through interviews with Brasse.

== Synopsis ==
Portrecista (The Portraitist) examines the life and work of Wilhelm Brasse, who had been trained as a portrait photographer at his aunt's studio prior to World War II and passionately loved taking photographs. After his capture and imprisonment by the Nazis at Auschwitz concentration camp in 1940, at the age of 23, he was forced to take "identity pictures" of between approximately 40,000 to 50,000 other inmates between 1940 and 1945. With "courage and skill", documenting "cruelty which goes beyond all words ... for future generations", after his liberation at the end of World War II, Brasse "could not continue with his profession" and would never take another photograph.

In Portrecista Brasse relates the "story behind some pictures in the Auschwitz-Birkenau State Museum archives that he remembers taking," which is "illustrated with archive stock and iconography."

== Production details and screenings ==
Written, directed, and edited by Irek Dobrowolski, produced by Anna Dobrowolska for TVP1, Poland, and filmed by cinematographer Jacek Taszakowski, this documentary film, starring Wilhelm Brasse (as himself), was first shown in the "Proud to Present" series on the Polish television station TVP1 on January 24, 2006, and then was shown at the Warsaw International Film Festival's "Jewish Motives" division, where it won the Grand Prix "Golden Phoenix of Warsaw" and at the 46th Kraków Film Festival, where it won the National Competition Silver "Lajkonik". Its English premiere as The Portraitist was at the Polish Film Festival, at West London Synagogue, in London, on March 19, 2007, with a second screening by popular demand, on April 22, 2007, and, after the premiere, the audience participated in a "Q&A" with Dobrowolski and Brasse.

It was also screened at other Polish film festivals throughout Europe and film festivals in North America and garnered some additional awards.

== Selected critical responses ==
In her 2004 book Photographing the Holocaust: Interpreting the Evidence, published a year before the release of this film, Auschwitz historian Janina Struk recounted "the history of the use and abuse of Holocaust photographs" depicting atrocities. Struk interviewed Brasse for her book in 2000. At the camp's photo processing room, he saw the footage of Soviet POWs being massacred with axes outside Block 11, and said, that he will never forget the scenes in this film made by SS man Walter using his 16mm Agfa Monik film camera. The Germans keen on documenting the industrial nature of murder did not possess the knowledge and skills of photo lab technicians, and relegated the work to Erkennungsdienst prisoners like Brasse, "the portraitist" of Auschwitz.

The film program of the Toronto Photography Festival 'Contact 2008' held throughout the month of May, in Toronto, Ontario, Canada, where The Portraitist was shown on May 10, says that "Brasse tells his story with chilling simplicity and haunting detail", noting that some images may disturb.

In reviewing the Contact 2008 screening, Fran Schechter observes that "Director Ireneusz Dobrowolski mixes the recollections of the now elderly survivor [Wilhelm Brasse] with a gallery of mug shots and SS portraits and wartime film footage of ghettos and concentration camps." Schechter notes: "Any Holocaust testimony has an impact", but adds: "this film could have delved deeper into the question of why the Nazis made photographs and other documentation of people they considered expendable", and is left wondering: "Were they proud of their savage efficiency, or using photography to normalize their actions?" Such questions lead to another controversial subject: "the roots of Nazi psychology", the title of a 2000 book by Jay Y. Gonen.

== See also ==
- Czesława Kwoka
- Expulsion of Poles by Germany
- Kidnapping of Polish children by Nazi Germany
- Nazi crimes against ethnic Poles
- Photography of the Holocaust
