= The Holocaust and social media =

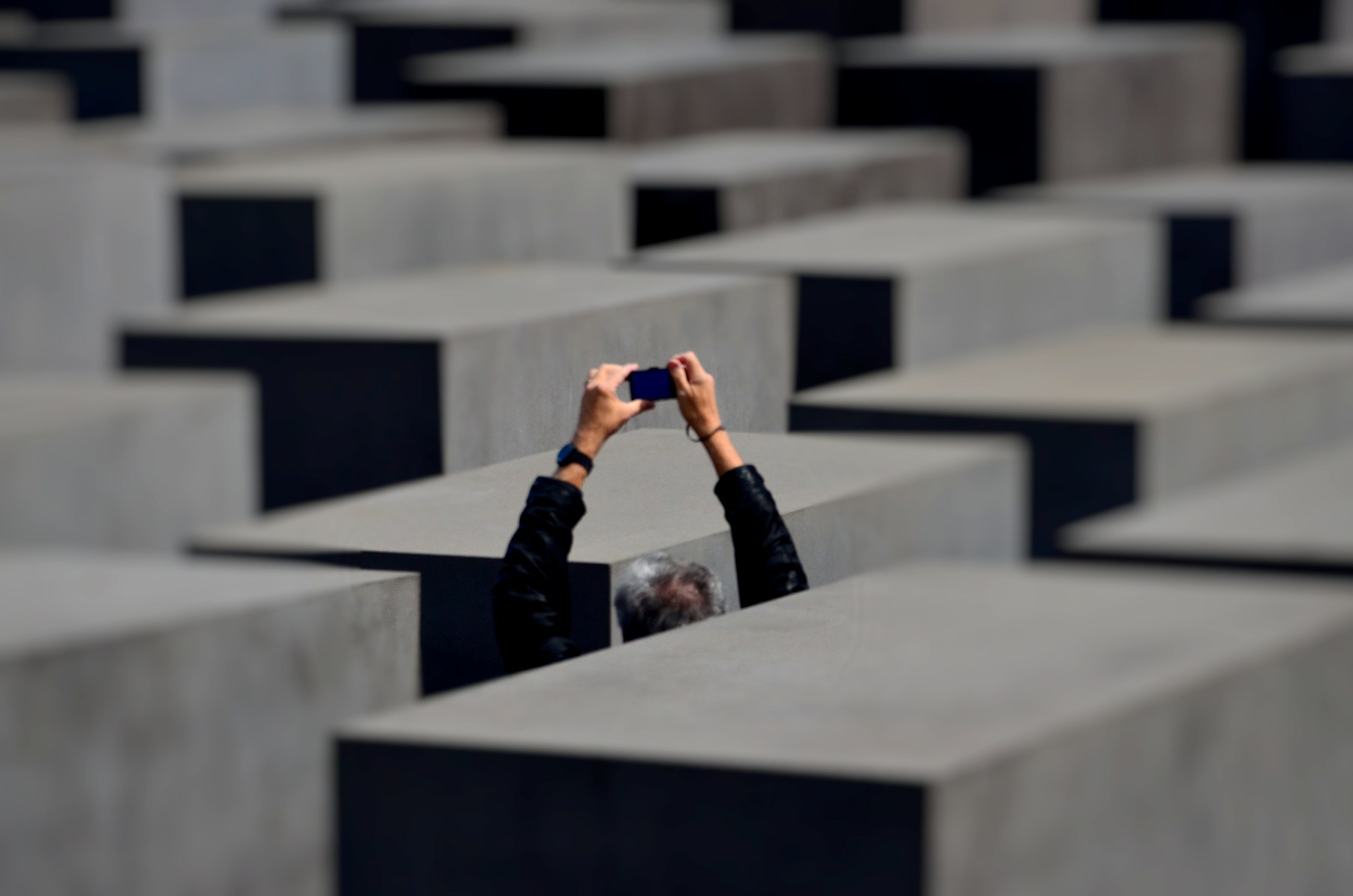
Tourist taking a photograph of the Memorial to the Murdered Jews of Europe in Berlin

The representation of the Holocaust on social media has been a subject of scholarly inquiry and media attention.

== Selfies at Holocaust memorial sites ==
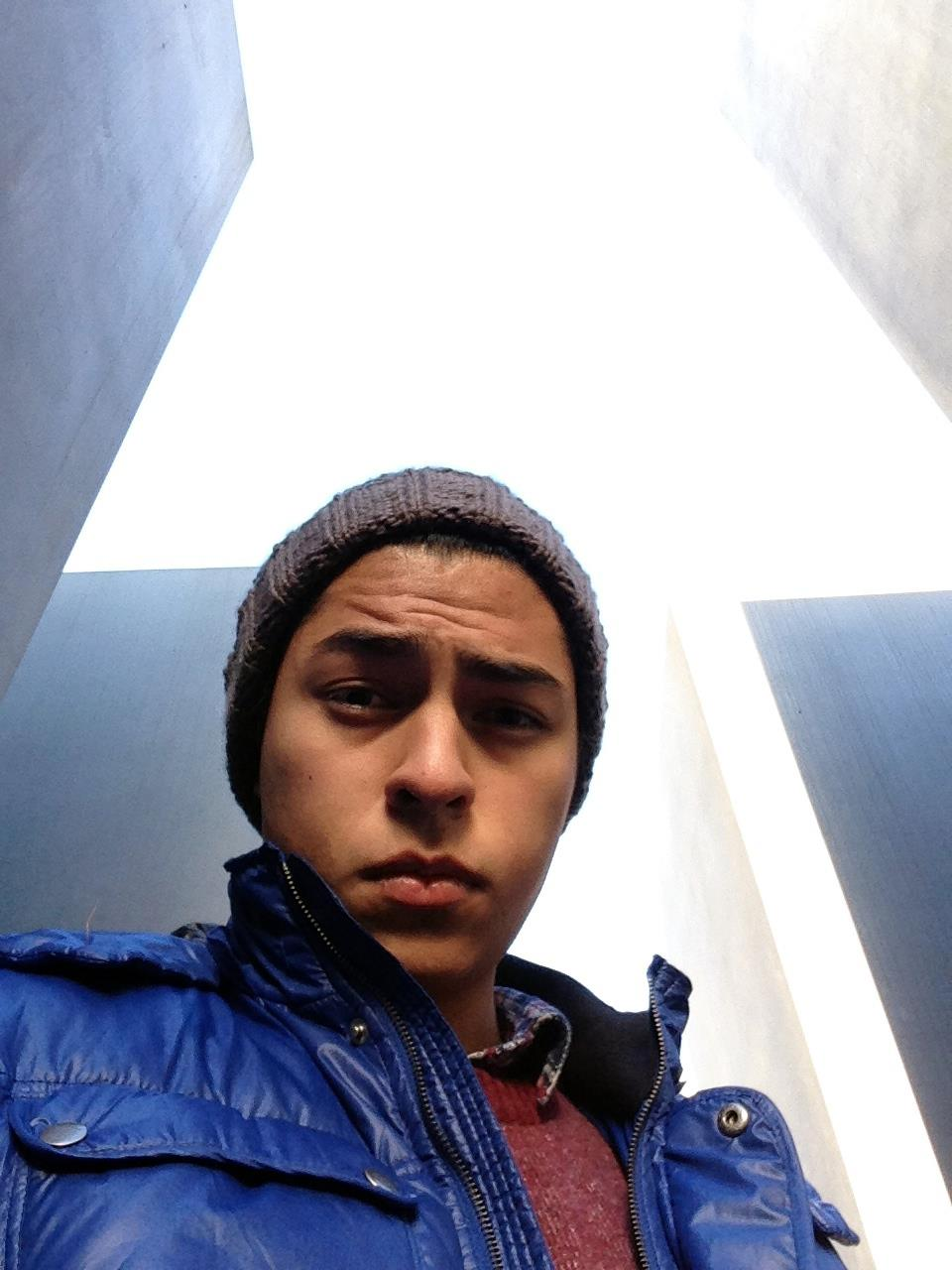
A young man taking a selfie at the Memorial to the Murdered Jews of Europe

Some visitors take selfies at Holocaust memorials, which has been the subject of controversy. In 2018, Rhian Sugden, a British model, received criticism after posting a selfie at the Memorial to the Murdered Jews of Europe in Berlin with the caption "ET phone home". She later removed the caption, but defended taking the photograph. Other celebrities have also been criticised for photographs at the Berlin memorial, including Indian actress Priyanka Chopra and US politician Pete Buttigieg, whose husband posted a photograph of him at the memorial on a personal social media account.

The Israeli artist and satirist Shahak Shapira set up the website yolocaust.de in 2017 to expose people who take inappropriate selfies at the Holocaust memorial in Berlin. Shapira went through thousands of selfies posted to social media sites such as Facebook, Instagram, Tinder, and Grindr, choosing the twelve that he found most offensive. When the images were moused over, the website replaces the memorial backdrop with black and white images of Nazi victims. "Yolocaust" is a portmanteau of "Holocaust" and YOLO, an acronym for "you only live once". The website went viral, receiving 1.2 million views in the first 24 hours after its launch. Shapira honored requests to take down all of the photographs, which he had used without permission, and the website remains with only a textual documentation of the project. In an analysis of comments by Internet users on the project, Christoph Bareither estimated that 75% were positive. However, the memorial's architect, Peter Eisenman, criticized the website.

In his 2018 book Postcards from Auschwitz, Grinnell professor Daniel P. Reynolds defends the practice of selfie-taking at Holocaust sites. In 2019, the Auschwitz-Birkenau State Museum requested that visitors not take inappropriate selfies, although the museum's staff acknowledged that other visitors take selfies in a thoughtful and respectful manner, which they did not criticize.

In an academic paper, Gemma Commane and Rebekah Potton analyze the use of Instagram to share tourist photographs at Holocaust sites and conclude that "Instagram encourages conversation and empathy, keeping the Holocaust visible in youth discourses". According to their analysis, most images are tagged with respectful hashtags such as #tragic, #remembrance, and #sadness. The Auschwitz museum has an official Instagram account, auschwitzmemorial, which it uses to share selected appropriate Instagram posts. However, the image feed for the hashtag "Auschwitz" includes potentially offensive images such as an image of "Nazi Vs. Jews #beerpong". This image, according to the authors, expresses "mockery and contempt" for Holocaust victims. They also document offensive memes using images of Holocaust atrocities and shared on Instagram. Some social media users post in order to criticize what they see as inappropriate behavior at Holocaust sites, with one commenting, "Taking photos posing next to razor wire, selfies with victim's hair in the background, and even group shots in front of the crematoria had to be seen to be believed."

== Assessment of tourism ==
Social media posts have been used by researchers to analyze the phenomenon of Holocaust-related tourism.

== Social media groups ==
People have created groups on Facebook to discuss issues related to the Holocaust. One paper analyses two such groups, "The Holocaust and My Family" and "The Descendants of the Victims and Survivors of the Holocaust" in which people engage in collective trauma processing.

== Eva.stories ==
In 2019, Israeli high-tech entrepreneur Mati Kochavi created a fictitious Instagram account for Eva Heyman, a Hungarian-Jewish girl who was murdered in Auschwitz concentration camp. The project met with mixed reception. Israeli prime minister Benjamin Netanyahu praised the project, saying that it "exposes the immense tragedy of our people through the story of one girl".

== Holocaust denial ==
The issue of Holocaust denial on social media has also attracted attention. In October 2020, Facebook reversed its policy and banned Holocaust denial from the platform. Founder Mark Zuckerberg had previously argued that such content should not be banned on freedom of speech grounds.

== See also ==
- Holocaust distortion
- Photography of the Holocaust
- Public diplomacy of Israel
- Red triangle (badge)
  - Donald Trump and fascism
- Rumble (company)
