= Grobla, Lublin Voivodeship =

Grobla
- Settlement
- Location within Poland
- Coordinates: 50°48′21″N 23°1′37″E
- Country: Poland
- Voivodeship: Lublin
- County: Zamość
- Gmina: Nielisz

Grobla [ˈɡrɔbla] is a settlement in the administrative district of Gmina Nielisz, within Zamość County, Lublin Voivodeship, in eastern Poland.
