= Gruszka Duża-Kolonia =

- Village
- Location within Poland
- Coordinates: 50°48′51″N 22°57′29″E
- Country: Poland
- Voivodeship: Lublin
- County: Zamość
- Gmina: Nielisz

Gruszka Duża-Kolonia [ˈɡruʂka ˈduʐa kɔˈlɔɲa] is a village, in the administrative district of Gmina Nielisz, within Zamość County, Lublin Voivodeship, in eastern Poland.
