= Zamszany =

- Village
- Location within Poland
- Coordinates: 50°51′N 23°7′E
- Country: Poland
- Voivodeship: Lublin
- County: Zamość
- Gmina: Nielisz

Zamszany [zamˈʂanɨ] is a village in the administrative district of Gmina Nielisz, within Zamość County, Lublin Voivodeship, in eastern Poland.
