= Kolonia Emska =

- Village
- Location within Poland
- Coordinates: 50°50′03″N 23°00′15″E
- Country: Poland
- Voivodeship: Lublin
- County: Zamość
- Gmina: Nielisz

Kolonia Emska [kɔˈlɔɲa ˈɛmska] is a village in the administrative district of Gmina Nielisz, within Zamość County, Lublin Voivodeship, in eastern Poland.
