= Czesława Kwoka =

Holocaust victim (1928–1943)

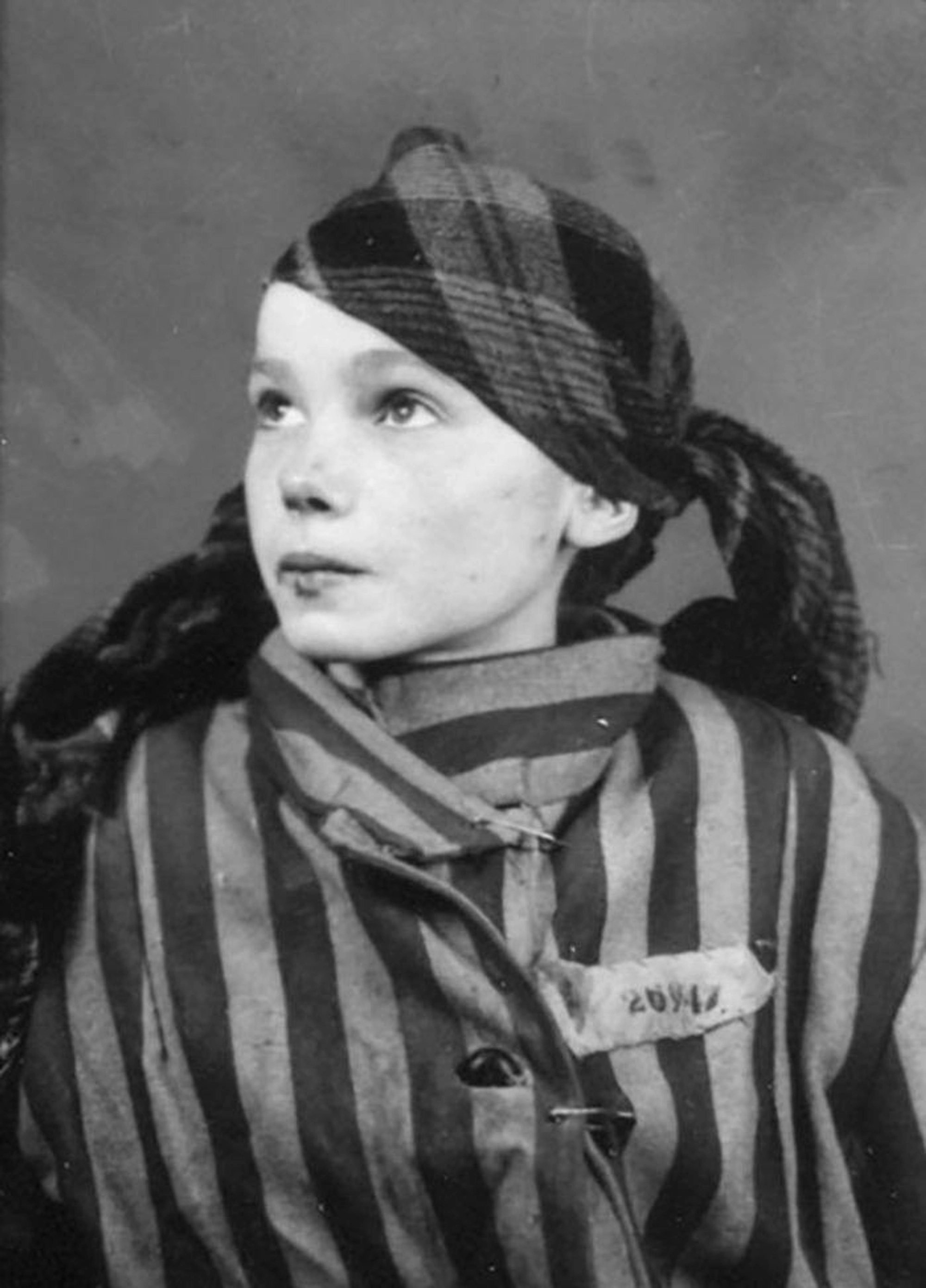
- Kwoka as an inmate at Auschwitz concentration camp in late 1942 or early 1943; Photograph credit: Auschwitz-Birkenau State Museum and Wilhelm Brasse
- Born: 15 August 1928; Wólka Złojecka, Poland
- Died: 12 March 1943 (aged 14); Auschwitz, German-occupied Poland
- Known for: being one of thousands of victims of Nazi crimes against ethnic Poles whose "identity pictures" were taken at Auschwitz
- Parent(s): Katarzyna and Paweł Kwoka

Personal details
- Nationality: Polish
- Religion: Roman Catholic

Czesława Kwoka (15 August 1928 – 12 March 1943) was a Polish Catholic girl who was murdered at the age of 14 in Auschwitz. One of thousands of child victims of genocide of Poles by Nazi Germany in German-occupied Poland, she is among those memorialized in an Auschwitz-Birkenau State Museum exhibit, "Block no. 6: Exhibition: The Life of the Prisoners".

Photographs of Kwoka and others, taken by the "famous photographer of Auschwitz", Wilhelm Brasse, between 1940 and 1945, are displayed in the Museum's photographic memorial. Brasse discusses several of the photographs in The Portraitist, a 2005 television documentary about her.

== Early life ==
Czesława Kwoka was born in Wólka Złojecka, a small village in Poland, to Roman Catholic parents Katarzyna (née Matwiejczuk), and Paweł Kwoka.

== Deportation to Auschwitz ==
Along with her mother (prisoner number 26946), Kwoka (prisoner number 26947) was deported from her village, and transported from a resettlement camp at Zamość, General Government, to Auschwitz, on 13 December 1942, during Operation Zamość which was initiated in November that year to create Lebensraum for Germans in eastern Europe.

Kwoka was one of the "approximately 230,000 children and young people aged less than eighteen" among the 1,300,000 people who were deported to Auschwitz from 1940 to 1945. Most of these children "arrived in the camp along with their families as part of the various operations that the Nazis carried out against whole ethnic or social groups". Of all these children and young people, "only slightly more than 20,000 ... including 11,000 Gypsies, were entered in the camp records. No more than 650 of them survived until liberation [in 1945]."

=== Photographs of Kwoka ===
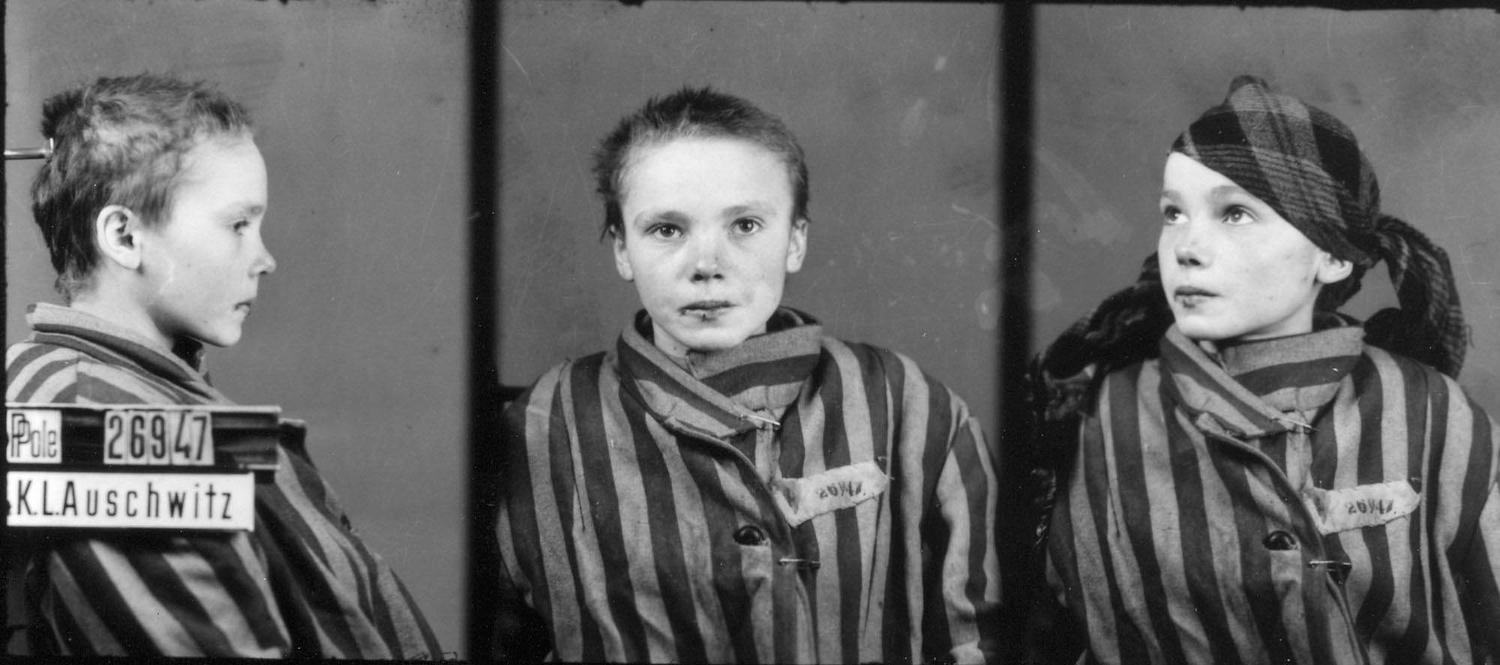
Czesława Kwoka in 1942 or 1943. (Photograph credit: Auschwitz-Birkenau State Museum and Wilhelm Brasse)

After her arrival at Auschwitz, Kwoka was photographed for the Reich's concentration camp records, and she was identified as one of the approximately 40,000 to 50,000 subjects of such "identity pictures" taken under duress at Auschwitz-Birkenau by Wilhelm Brasse, a young Polish inmate in his twenties (known as Auschwitz prisoner number 3444). Trained as a portrait photographer at his aunt's studio prior to the 1939 German invasion of Poland beginning World War II, Brasse and others had been ordered to photograph inmates by their Nazi captors under threat.

These photographs that he and others were ordered to take capture each inmate "in three poses: from the front and from each side." Though ordered to destroy all photographs and their negatives, Brasse became famous after the war for having helped to rescue some of them from oblivion. He recounted his photographs of Kwoka specifically in The Portraitist, a Polish documentary about his life and experiences at Auschwitz.

== Death ==
On 12 March 1943, less than a month after her mother's death on 18 February, Kwoka was murdered at the age of 14; the circumstances of her death were not recorded. Her death certificate, issued on 23 March, falsely noted that she died of cachexia from intestinal catarrh. Reports indicate that the real cause of death was a phenol injection to the heart.

== Legacy ==
=== Memorial exhibits ===
While most photographs of Auschwitz inmates (both victims and survivors) no longer exist, some photographs do populate memorial displays at the Auschwitz-Birkenau State Museum, where the photographs of Kwoka reside, and at Yad Vashem, Israel's official memorial to the Jewish victims of the Holocaust.

Captions attached to the photographs in the Auschwitz-Birkenau State Museum photo archives and memorial indoor exhibits have been constructed by the Museum Exhibition Department from camp registries and other records confiscated when the camps were liberated in 1945 and archived subsequently. These Museum photo archive captions attached to photographs assembled and/or developed from photographs and negatives rescued by Brasse and fellow inmate darkroom worker Bronislaw Jureczek during 1940 to 1945 identify the inmate by name, concentration-camp prisoner number, date and place of birth, date of death and age at death (if applicable), national or ethnic identity, religious affiliation, and date of arrival in the camp. Some photographs credited to Brasse, including the "identity picture" with 3 poses of Kwoka, are in the Auschwitz-Birkenau State Museum's memorial to prisoners, part of a permanent indoor exhibit called Block no. 6: Exhibition: The Life of the Prisoners, first mounted in 1955.

Kwoka's likeness is also featured by the museum's Exhibition Department on its official website, in some of the Museum's published albums and catalogues, and in the documentary The Portraitist.

The photo mural including Kwoka's "identity pictures" ("identification photographs" or "mug shots") displayed on a wall in the Auschwitz-Birkenau State Museum's permanent indoor exhibition The Life of the Prisoners in Block no. 6 is captured in Ryszard Domasik's photograph cropped (without the photographs of Kwoka) featured on its official Website.

=== Art ===
"Bring[ing] Czeslawa's image and voice into our lives", Theresa Edwards (verse) and Lori Schreiner (art) created Painting Czesława Kwoka, a collaborative work of mixed media inspired by Brasse's photographs, as a commemoration of child victims of the Holocaust.

On the 75th anniversary of her death, a colorized version of the photographs was published by Brazilian artist Marina Amaral.

== See also ==
- Kinder KZ, a Nazi concentration camp for children in Łodź, Poland
