= Gościniec, Lublin Voivodeship =

Gościniec
- Settlement
- Location within Poland
- Coordinates: 50°47′22″N 22°59′22″E
- Country: Poland
- Voivodeship: Lublin
- County: Zamość
- Gmina: Nielisz

Gościniec (Polish pronunciation: [ɡɔɕˈt͡ɕiɲɛt͡s]) is a settlement in the administrative district of Gmina Nielisz, within Zamość County, Lublin Voivodeship, in eastern Poland.
