= Staw Noakowski-Kolonia =

- Village
- Location within Poland
- Coordinates: 50°49′44″N 23°03′34″E
- Country: Poland
- Voivodeship: Lublin
- County: Zamość
- Gmina: Nielisz

Staw Noakowski-Kolonia [ˈstaf nɔaˈkɔfski kɔˈlɔɲa] is a village in the administrative district of Gmina Nielisz, within Zamość County, Lublin Voivodeship, in eastern Poland.
