= Krzak, Lublin Voivodeship =

Krzak
- Village
- Location within Poland
- Coordinates: 50°48′N 23°6′E
- Country: Poland
- Voivodeship: Lublin
- County: Zamość
- Gmina: Nielisz

Krzak [kʂak] is a village in the administrative district of Gmina Nielisz, within Zamość County, Lublin Voivodeship, in eastern Poland.
