= Deszkowice-Kolonia =

- Village
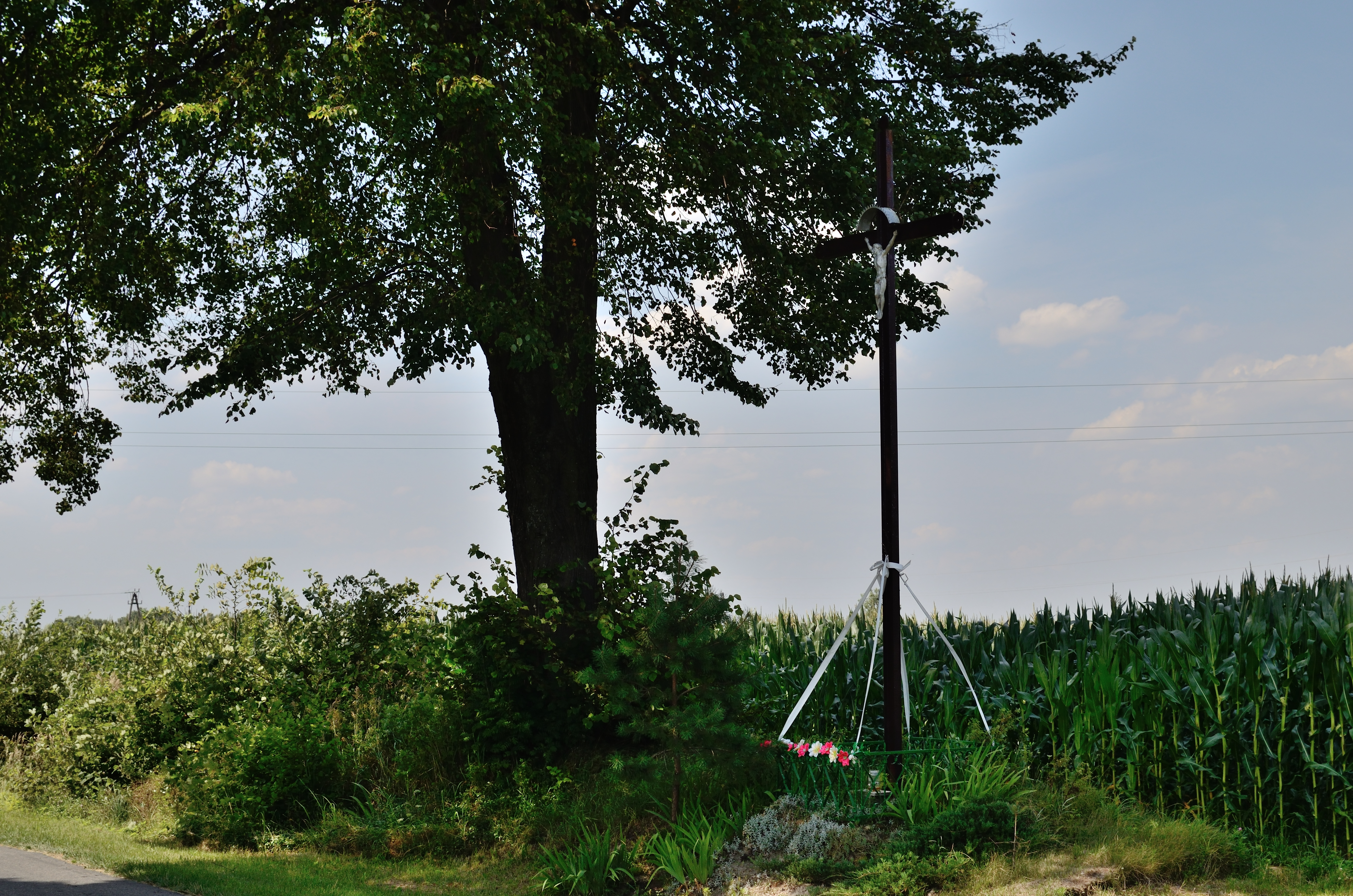
- Flag

- Location within Poland
- Coordinates: 50°48′10″N 23°07′06″E
- Country: Poland
- Voivodeship: Lublin
- County: Zamość
- Gmina: Nielisz

Deszkowice-Kolonia [dɛʂkɔˈvit͡sɛ kɔˈlɔɲa] is a village in the administrative district of Gmina Nielisz, within Zamość County, Lublin Voivodeship, in eastern Poland.
