= Poprzeczka =

- Settlement
- Location within Poland
- Coordinates: 50°48′10″N 23°1′9″E
- Country: Poland
- Voivodeship: Lublin
- County: Zamość
- Gmina: Nielisz

Poprzeczka [pɔˈpʂɛt͡ʂka] is a settlement in the administrative district of Gmina Nielisz, within Zamość County, Lublin Voivodeship, in eastern Poland.
