= Gruszka Mała Druga =

- Village
- Location within Poland
- Coordinates: 50°47′44″N 22°58′24″E
- Country: Poland
- Voivodeship: Lublin
- County: Zamość
- Gmina: Nielisz
- Population (approx.): 120

Gruszka Mała Druga [ˈɡruʂka ˈmawa ˈdruɡa] is a village in the administrative district of Gmina Nielisz, within Zamość County, Lublin Voivodeship, in eastern Poland.
