= Staw Ujazdowski =

- Village
- Location within Poland
- Coordinates: 50°50′N 23°2′E
- Country: Poland
- Voivodeship: Lublin
- County: Zamość
- Gmina: Nielisz
- Time zone: UTC+1 (CET)
  - Summer (DST): UTC+2 (CEST)

Staw Ujazdowski [ˈstaf ujazˈdɔfski] is a village in the administrative district of Gmina Nielisz, within Zamość County, Lublin Voivodeship, in eastern Poland.

== History ==
11 Polish citizens were murdered by Nazi Germany in the village during World War II.
