= Staw Ujazdowski-Kolonia =

Village in Lublin Voivodeship, Poland

- Village
- Location within Poland
- Coordinates: 50°49′26″N 23°00′08″E
- Country: Poland
- Voivodeship: Lublin
- County: Zamość
- Gmina: Nielisz

Staw Ujazdowski-Kolonia [ˈstaf ujazˈdɔfski kɔˈlɔɲa] is a village in the administrative district of Gmina Nielisz, within Zamość County, Lublin Voivodeship, in eastern Poland.
