= Ruskie Piaski =

- Village
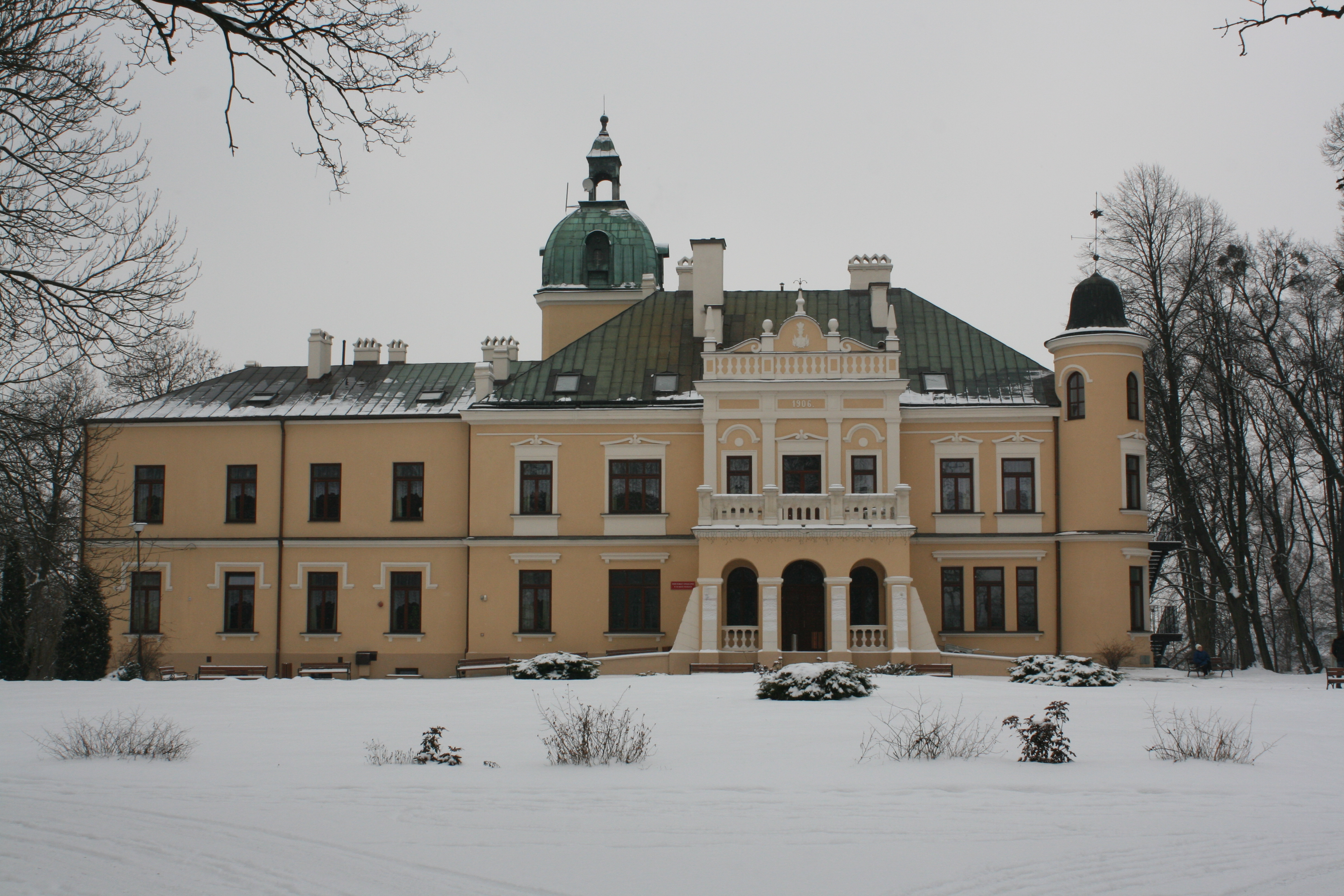
- Palace

- Location within Poland
- Coordinates: 50°49′N 23°7′E
- Country: Poland
- Voivodeship: Lublin
- County: Zamość
- Gmina: Nielisz
- Time zone: UTC+1 (CET)
  - Summer (DST): UTC+2 (CEST)

Ruskie Piaski (Polish pronunciation: [ˈruskʲɛ ˈpjaskʲi]) is a village in the administrative district of Gmina Nielisz, within Zamość County, Lublin Voivodeship, in eastern Poland.

== History ==
Six Polish citizens were murdered by Nazi Germany in the village during World War II.
