= Niwa, Zamość County =

Niwa
- Settlement
- Location within Poland
- Coordinates: 50°47′51″N 23°1′1″E
- Country: Poland
- Voivodeship: Lublin
- County: Zamość
- Gmina: Nielisz

Niwa [ˈɲiva] is a settlement in the administrative district of Gmina Nielisz, within Zamość County, Lublin Voivodeship, in eastern Poland.
