= Gmina Nielisz =

Gmina Nielisz Nielisz Commune
- Gmina
- Flag Coat of arms
- Interactive map of Gmina Nielisz
- Coordinates (Nielisz): 50°48′N 23°3′E
- Country: Poland
- Voivodeship: Lublin
- County: Zamość County
- Seat: Nielisz

Area
  - Total: 113.16 km^{2} (43.69 sq mi)

Population (2013)
  - Total: 5,723
  - Density: 50.57/km^{2} (131.0/sq mi)
- Website: http://www.nielisz.pl/

Gmina Nielisz is a rural gmina (administrative district) in Zamość County, Lublin Voivodeship, in eastern Poland. Its seat is the village of Nielisz, which lies approximately 18 kilometres (11 mi) north-west of Zamość and 60 km (37 mi) south-east of the regional capital Lublin.

The gmina covers an area of 113.16 square kilometres (43.7 sq mi), and as of 2006 its total population is 6,025 (5,723 in 2013).

== Villages ==
Gmina Nielisz contains the villages and settlements of Deszkowice-Kolonia, Gościniec, Grobla, Gruszka Duża, Gruszka Duża-Kolonia, Gruszka Mała Druga, Gruszka Mała Pierwsza, Kolonia Emska, Krzak, Las, Nawóz, Nielisz, Niwa, Poprzeczka, Ruskie Piaski, Średnie Duże, Średnie Małe, Staw Noakowski, Staw Noakowski-Kolonia, Staw Ujazdowski, Staw Ujazdowski-Kolonia, Ujazdów, Wólka Nieliska, Wólka Złojecka, Zamszany, Zarudzie and Złojec.

== Neighbouring gminas ==
Gmina Nielisz is bordered by the gminas of Izbica, Rudnik, Stary Zamość, Sułów, Szczebrzeszyn and Zamość.
