= Gruszka Duża =

- Village
- Location within Poland
- Coordinates: 50°48′N 22°58′E
- Country: Poland
- Voivodeship: Lublin
- County: Zamość
- Gmina: Nielisz

Gruszka Duża [ˈɡruʂka ˈduʐa] is a village in the administrative district of Gmina Nielisz, within Zamość County, Lublin Voivodeship, in eastern Poland.
