= Gruszka Mała Pierwsza =

- Village
- Location within Poland
- Coordinates: 50°48′06″N 22°59′15″E
- Country: Poland
- Voivodeship: Lublin
- County: Zamość
- Gmina: Nielisz

Gruszka Mała Pierwsza [ˈɡruʂka ˈmawa ˈpjɛrfʂa] is a village in the administrative district of Gmina Nielisz, within Zamość County, Lublin Voivodeship, in eastern Poland.
