= Las, Lublin Voivodeship =

Las
- Village
- Location within Poland
- Coordinates: 50°46′33″N 23°2′27″E
- Country: Poland
- Voivodeship: Lublin
- County: Zamość
- Gmina: Nielisz

Las [las] is a village in the administrative district of Gmina Nielisz, within Zamość County, Lublin Voivodeship, in eastern Poland.
