= Photography of the Holocaust =

World War II photographs

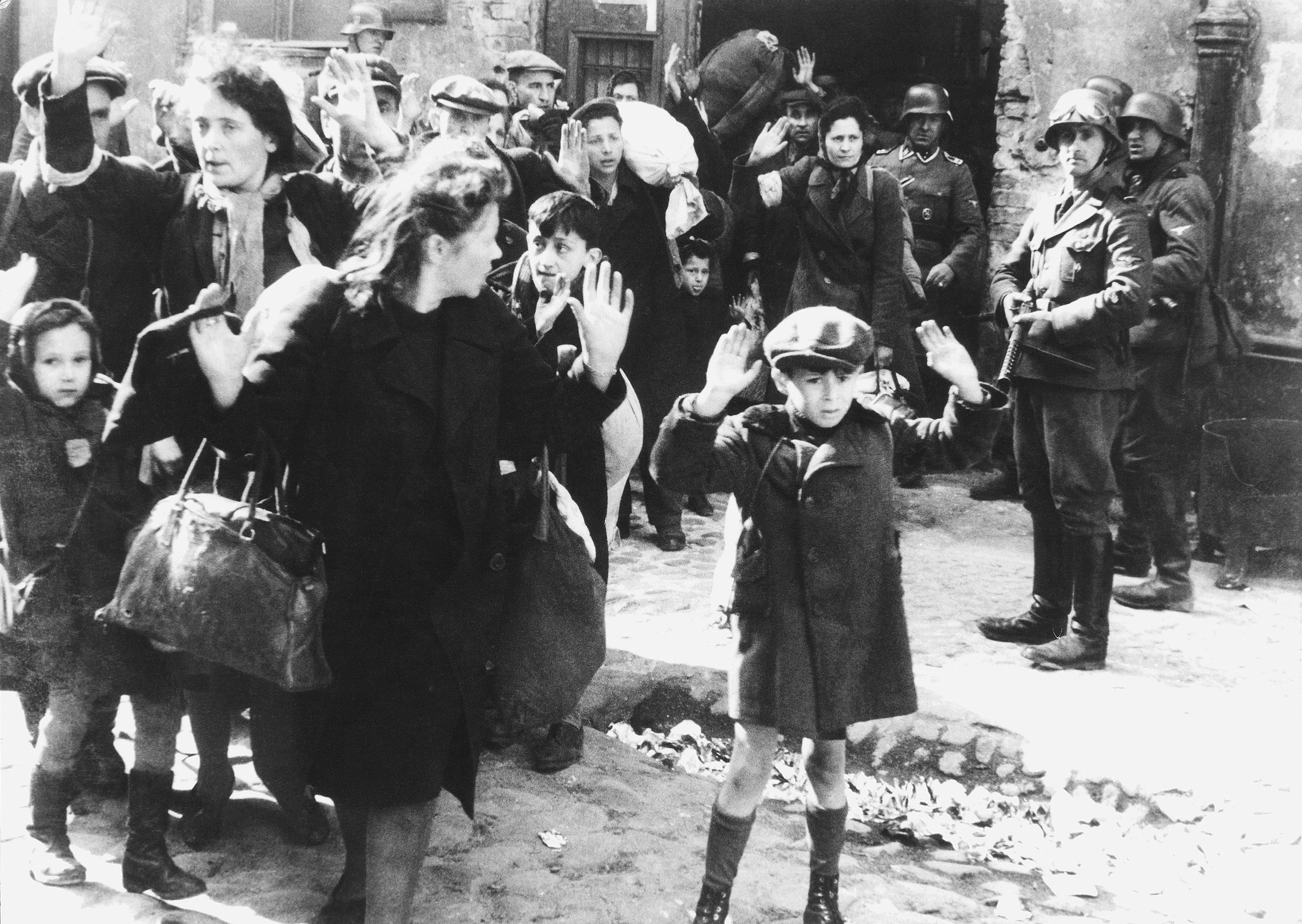
"Warsaw Ghetto boy". The image is one of the most iconic photographs of the Holocaust.

Photography of the Holocaust is a topic of interest to scholars of the Holocaust. Such studies are often situated in the academic fields related to visual culture and visual sociology studies. Photographs created during the Holocaust also raise questions in terms of ethics related to their creation and later reuse.

== Origin of the photos ==
Much of the photography of the Holocaust is the work of Nazi German photographers. Some originated as routine administrative procedure, such as identification photographs (mug shots); others were intended to illustrate the construction and functioning of the camps or prisoner transport. There were also photographs of concentration camps authorized for use by German media, those appeared in print around 1933–1936 in German newspapers and magazines such as Deutsche Illustrirte Zeitung or Münchner Illustrierte Presse. A small number of pictures appeared in later years, vetted by propaganda and censorship officials before publication.

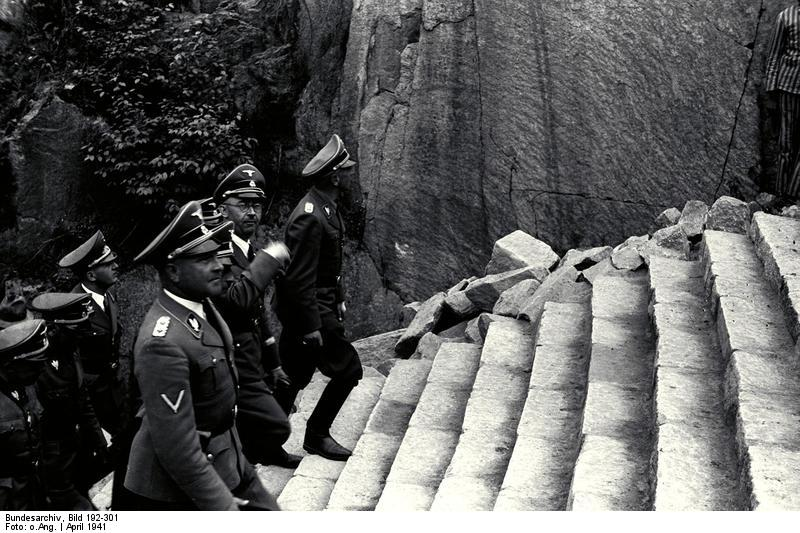
Official visit of Himmler to Mauthausen in June 1941.

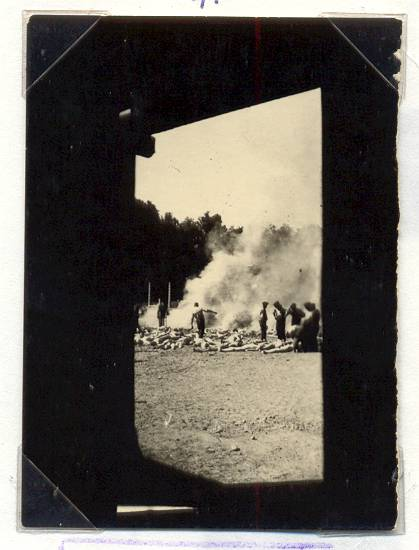
Bodies waiting to be burned outdoors in Auschwitz-Birkenau. Taken in secret by a team of Sonderkommando workers in August 1944 and later smuggled out to the Polish resistance.

Many photographs of the Holocaust are taken by unidentified authors, but others are known. Nazi German photographers of the Holocaust who acted in their official capacity include Bernhard Walter, Friedrich Franz Bauer, Franz Wolf, Albert Rum and Franz Suchomel. The destruction of the Warsaw Ghetto was methodically documented in the well-illustrated Stroop Report. Some photographs were taken by the camp prisoners themselves, for example by Wilhelm Brasse or Francisco Boix, working as aides for their Nazi overseers. There were also photographs taken in the ghettos by their Jewish inhabitants, some with official permission, some in secrecy as an act of defiance and for evidence purposes. Jewish photographers of the ghetto life included Henryk Ross and Mendel Grossman, both of whom documented the Łódź Ghetto. A number of other photographs of the Jewish ghetto life come from Nazi personnel and soldiers, many of whom treated those locales as tourist attractions. Unofficial photographs of the Holocaust were taken by, among others, Hubert Pfoch, Joe Heydecker, Willy Georg and Walter Genewein.

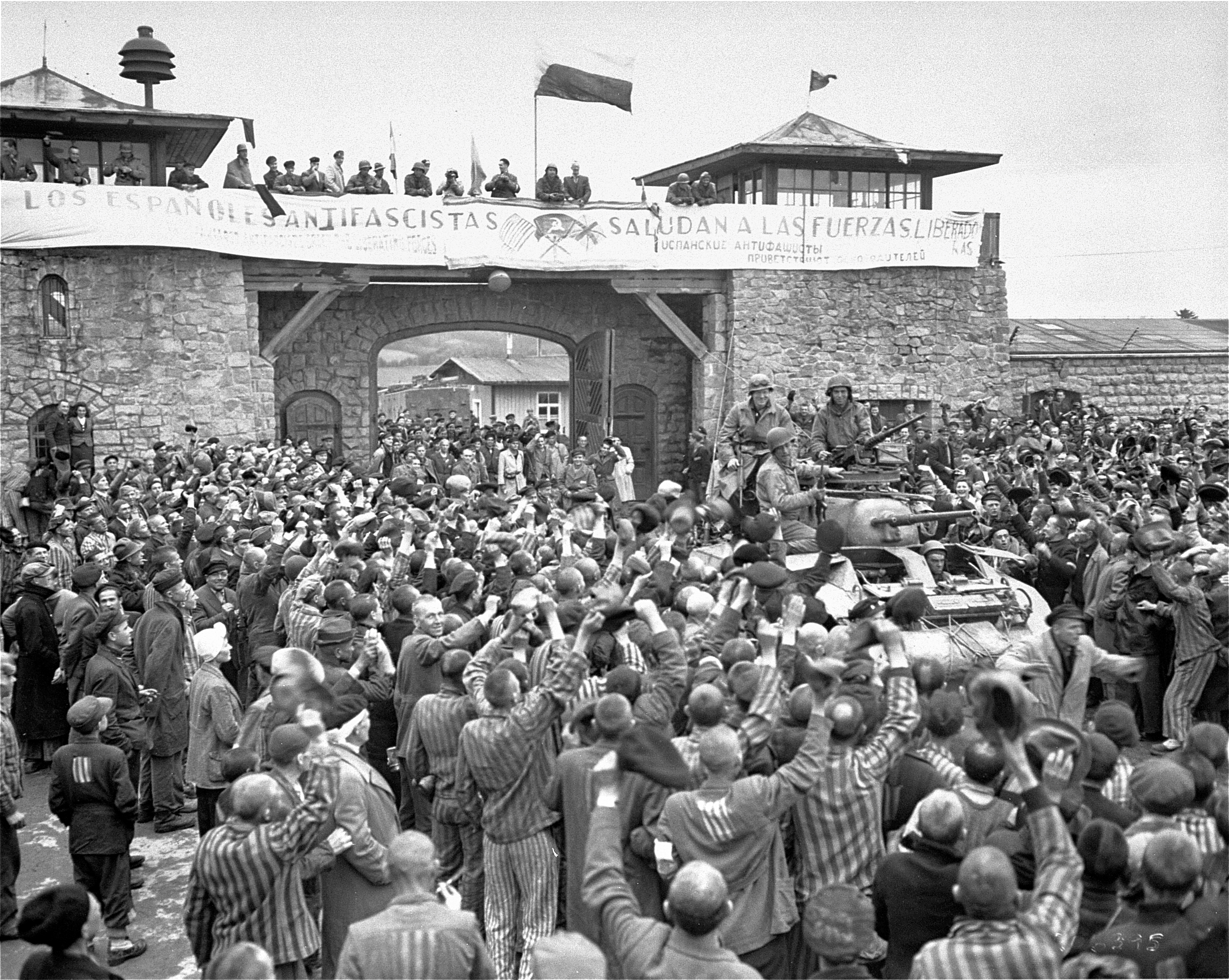
The prisoners of Mauthausen reenact their welcome to the US liberating troops in May 1945.

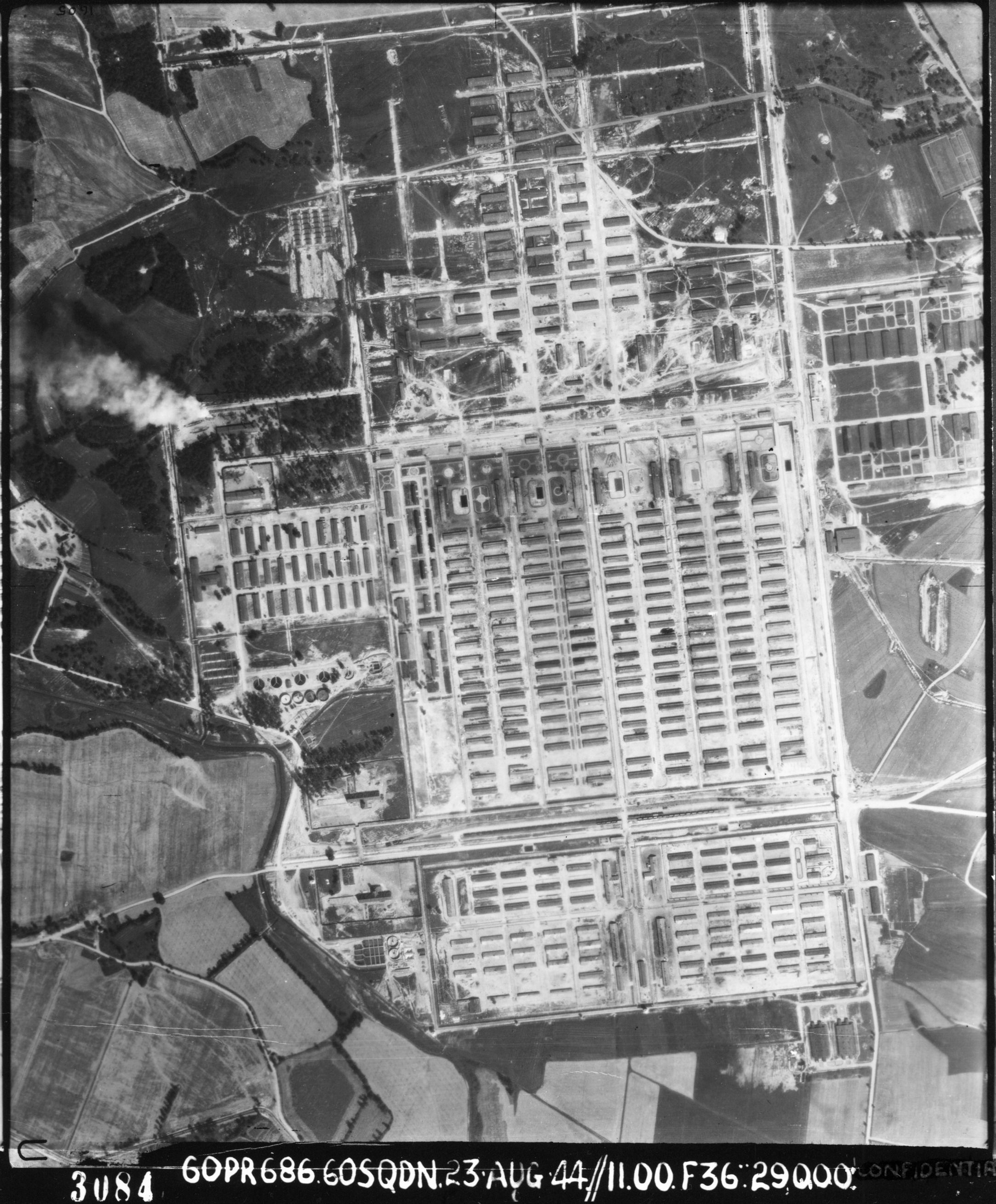
Aerial view of Auschwitz taken by the British RAF in August 1944.

Other photographs were taken during the liberation of the camps by photographers attached to Allied units which arrived to secure them. Such photographs started appearing from mid-1944, and gained wider notoriety in the spring 1945. Most Allied military photographers remain anonymous as they were seldom credited, unlike the press correspondents who published some of the first photo exposés of the camps; the latter included Lee Miller, Margaret Bourke-White, David Scherman, George Rodger, John Florea and William Vandivert. Because of the Cold War, many photographs made by the Soviets were treated with suspicion in the West, and received little coverage until decades later. Holocaust photography also includes aerial reconnaissance photos made by Allied aircraft.

Many photographs were destroyed, some accidentally, as collateral damage during the war, others on purpose, in attempts by perpetrators of the atrocities to suppress the evidence. Conversely, some Nazi photographs were stolen, hidden and preserved as evidence of atrocities by individuals such as Francisco Boix or Joe Heydecker.

The total number of surviving Holocaust-related photos has been estimated at over two million.

== Usage of the photos ==
A number of surviving photographs documenting Holocaust atrocities were used as evidence during post war trials of Nazi war crimes, such as the Nuremberg trials. They have been used as symbolic, impactful evidence to educate the world about the true nature of Nazi atrocities.

Historical photographs are considered valuable artifacts for historical studies and memorial institutions such as museums and galleries. There have been a number of gallery exhibits dedicated to this topic. They are used by scholars to refine understanding of historical events, in a form of visual archaeology. In addition to the photos themselves, caption of the photos have been analyzed as well, as they can be helpful in understanding framing biases; for example the same photo captioned in Russian might describe the victims as Soviet citizens, in Polish, as Polish citizens, and in Yiddish, as Jews.

At the same time, some have criticized whether unconditional public access to photographs of atrocities is ethical (as they were not taken with the subjects' consent, and have been known to cause distress to the subjects) and educational (as they have been accused of being trivialized in some contexts, or used out of context or with improper attribution). Demand for Holocaust atrocity photographs has resulted in a number of fake images turning up at auctions.

Inmate photographs were analyzed in a 2021 French documentary, From Where They Stood.

== See also ==
- The Holocaust and social media
- Sonderkommando photographs
- List of photographs considered the most important
