= Nielisz =

- Village
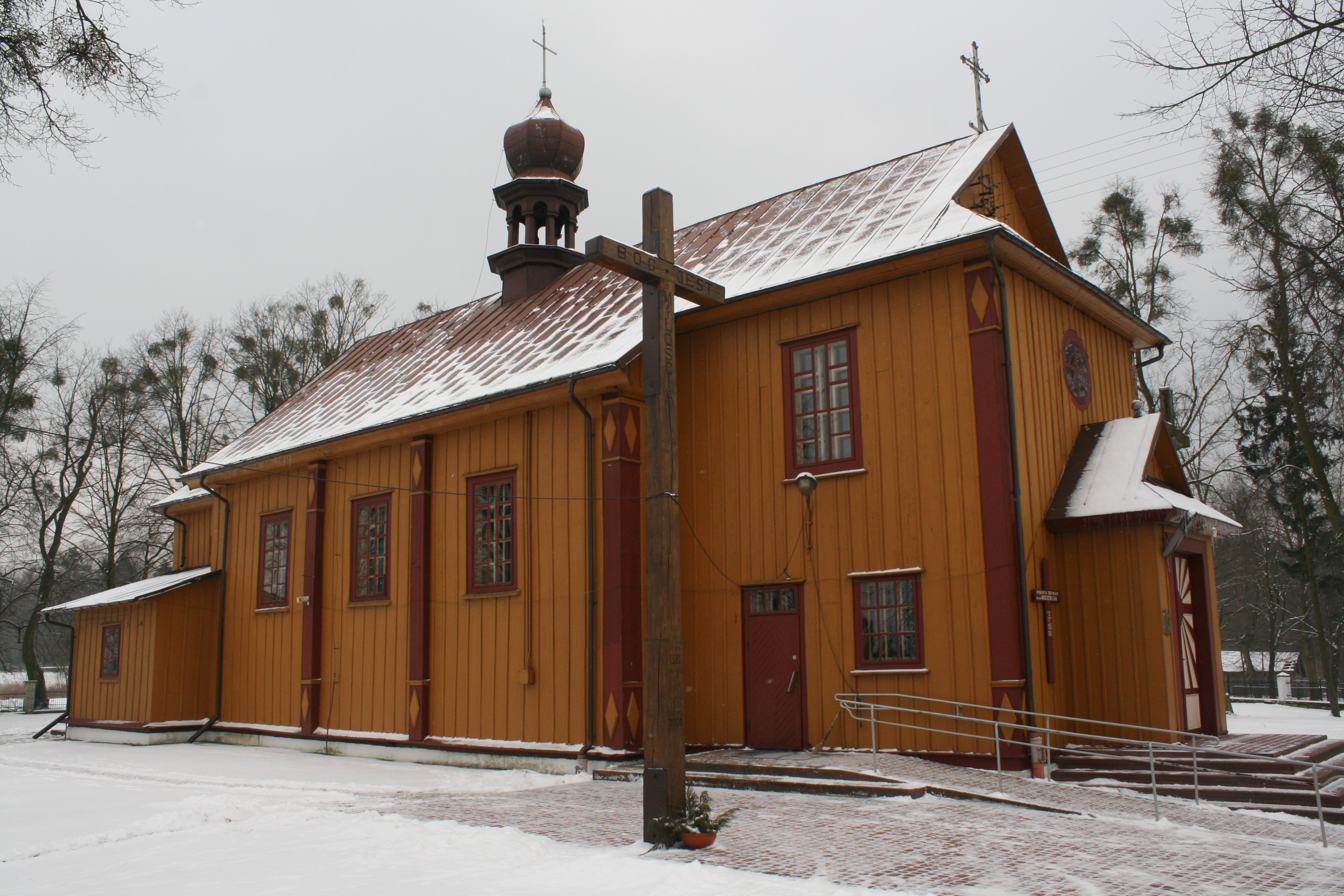
- Church of Saint Adalbert and Our Lady of the Rosary

- Location within Poland
- Coordinates: 50°48′N 23°3′E
- Country: Poland
- Voivodeship: Lublin
- County: Zamość
- Gmina: Nielisz

Population
  - Total: 921

Nielisz [ˈɲɛliʂ] is a village in Zamość County, Lublin Voivodeship, in eastern Poland. It is the seat of the gmina (administrative district) called Gmina Nielisz.
