= Ujazdów, Zamość County =

Ujazdów
- Village
- Location within Poland
- Coordinates: 50°51′N 23°6′E
- Country: Poland
- Voivodeship: Lublin
- County: Zamość
- Gmina: Nielisz

Ujazdów [uˈjazduf] is a village in the administrative district of Gmina Nielisz, within Zamość County, Lublin Voivodeship, in eastern Poland.
