= Wilhelm Brasse =

Polish photographer (1917–2012)

- Brasse in 2005 with one of his Auschwitz photographs (Portrecista)
- Born: 3 December 1917; Żywiec, Austria-Hungary
- Died: 23 October 2012 (aged 94); Żywiec, Poland
- Occupation: Photographer (1940–1945)
- Known for: Photography done under duress as inmate of Auschwitz concentration camp

Wilhelm Brasse (3 December 1917 – 23 October 2012) was a Polish professional photographer and a prisoner in Auschwitz during World War II. He became known as the "famous photographer of Auschwitz concentration camp". His life and work were the subject of the 2005 Polish television documentary film The Portraitist (Portrecista), which first aired in the Proud to Present series on the Polish TVP1 on 1 January 2006.

Brasse was of a mixed Austrian-Polish descent. He learnt photography in Katowice, the studio of his aunt. After the 1939 German invasion of Poland and occupation of Brasse's hometown Żywiec, in southern Poland, he was interrogated by the Schutzstaffel (SS). He refused to swear allegiance to Hitler, and was imprisoned for three months. After his release, still refusing to capitulate to the Volksliste and forced membership of German Army, he tried to escape to Hungary and join the Polish Army in France but was captured, along with other young men, at the Polish–Hungarian border and deported to KL Auschwitz-Birkenau as prisoner number 3444.

He was assigned to the camp's Erkennungsdienst, which photographed events in the camp, including medical experiments, and created portraits for the inmates' files. Brasse estimated that he took 40,000 to 50,000 "identity pictures" from 1940 until 1945, before being moved to another concentration camp in Austria, where he was liberated by the American forces in May 1945.

Although many of Brasse's photographs did not survive, some 2,000 are on display in the Auschwitz-Birkenau State Museum, and more at Yad Vashem, the Holocaust Martyrs' and Heroes' Remembrance Authority, Israel's official memorial to the Jewish victims of the Holocaust.

== Personal history ==
Wilhelm Brasse was born on 3 December 1917 to a descendant of Austrian settlers and a Polish mother in Żywiec, in the Partitioned Poland. His father was a Polish soldier in the Polish–Soviet War of 1919–1921.

After the September 1939 invasion of Poland, he was pressured by the Nazis to join them, refused, was repeatedly interrogated by the Gestapo, and tried to escape to France via Hungary, but he was captured at the Polish-Hungarian border and incarcerated for four months. After continuing to refuse to declare loyalty to Hitler, on 31 August 1940, he was deported to Auschwitz concentration camp, soon after it opened.

In February 1941, after having been called to the office of Rudolf Hoess, Auschwitz's commander, along with four others, and tested for "photographic skills", he was selected specifically for his "laboratory skills" and "technical ability with a camera" and for his ability to speak German, and then ordered to document the Nazi prisoners in the camp in the "Erkennungsdienst, the photographic identification unit." A year and a half later, Brasse encountered Josef Mengele, the notorious Nazi doctor who liked his photographs and wanted him to photograph some of the twins and people with congenital disorders moved to his infirmary on whom Mengele was "experimenting". After the Soviets entered Poland, during the Vistula-Oder Offensive, from 12 January to 2 February 1945, Brasse, along with thousands of other Auschwitz prisoners, was forcibly moved to the concentration camp in Ebensee, an Austrian subcamp of the Mauthausen-Gusen concentration camp complex (the last remaining in the area still controlled by the Nazis), where he remained imprisoned until the American forces liberated him in early May 1945.

After returning home to Żywiec, a few miles from KL Auschwitz-Birkenau, Brasse tried to start taking pictures again, but found himself haunted by the ghosts of the dead – the subjects of his tens of thousands of Auschwitz pictures – and was unable to resume his work as a portrait photographer. Abandoning photography, he established what became a "moderately prosperous" sausage casing business.

Although he later visited the State Museum at Auschwitz-Birkenau to talk with visitors about his experiences, and although he still possessed a small pre-war Kodak camera, he never took another photograph.

== Death ==
He died in Żywiec at the age of 94. He was married. He had two children and five grandchildren, and lived with his wife until his death. His death was announced by an Auschwitz-Birkenau State Museum historian.

== The Auschwitz photographs ==
Trained before the beginning of World War II as a portrait photographer at his aunt's studio, he was ordered by his SS supervisors to photograph "prisoners' work, criminal medical experiments, [and] portraits of the prisoners for the files." Brasse estimated that he took about 40,000 to 50,000 "identity pictures" from 1940 until 1945, before being forcibly moved to another concentration camp in Austria, where he was liberated by the American forces in early May 1945.

Mengele had insisted that Brasse take the "identity" portraits of Auschwitz prisoners "in three poses: from the front and from each side." After taking hundreds of thousands of such photographs, Brasse and Bronisław Jureczek (another prisoner from the photo laboratory) disobeyed later Nazi orders to destroy them, saving 38,916 photographs, yet only some of the surviving photos have been identified as Brasse's work, including the mugshots of 14 years old prisoner Czesława Kwoka.

although it is hard to say which were Brasse's, since camp photos as a rule didn't carry the photographer's name[,] ... Jarosław Mensfelt, spokesman of the Auschwitz-Birkenau museum, says some 200,000 such pictures were taken, with name, nationality and profession attached. ... About 40,000 of these pictures are preserved, some with the identification cards, and 2,000 of these are on display in the museum.... others are at Yad Vashem, the Israeli Holocaust memorial.

Some photographs credited to Brasse are in the Auschwitz-Birkenau State Museum's permanent exhibit in Block no. 6: Exhibition: The Life of the Prisoners.

Similar individual "identification photographs" or "mug shots" of prisoners of Auschwitz and other German concentration camps are accessible in the searchable online Photo Archives of the United States Holocaust Memorial Museum (USHMM). Biographical information cards including these photographs, each corresponding to a concentration camp inmate, are also distributed to Holocaust Memorial Museum visitors as they enter. Partially featured on the USHMM official website is a photograph of the photo mural on a wall of its 3rd floor permanent exhibit. A photograph of Lena Lakony, an adult female Auschwitz inmate by Wilhelm Brasse, is accessible from the USHMM Photo Archives. The USHMM official website also features similar "identification photographs" credited to the "National Auschwitz-Birkenau Museum" (the Auschwitz-Birkenau State Museum, Poland), but without identifying the photographer (who may or may not be Brasse), as illustrations in "Persecution of Homosexuals in the Third Reich".

== Documentary film: The Portraitist ==
Portrecista (TVP1, Poland, 2005): The Portraitist Photograph credit: Rekontrplan Film Group

A 52-minute Polish documentary film about his life and work, The Portraitist (Portrecista, Poland, 2005), directed by Irek Dobrowolski and produced by Anna Dobrowolska, was first shown on Polish television station TVP1 on 1 January 2006, in the "Proud to present" series. It premiered at West London Synagogue in London on 19 March 2007, with a second screening by popular demand on 22 April 2007. In the film Brasse relates the "story behind some pictures in the Auschwitz museum archives that he remembers taking."

As the synopsis for the film emphasizes, after taking thousands of photographs from 1940 until 1945, documenting "cruelty which goes beyond all words ... for future generations," Brasse could no longer continue with his profession.

== Filmography ==
- Auschwitz: Inside the Nazi State (BBC and PBS, 2005), episodes 1 and 2 ("Surprising Beginnings" and "Orders & Initiatives") ["Auschwitz: 1940–1945"].
- The Portraitist (Polish: Portrecista, TVP1, 2005; original language: Polish, subtitles: English; official trailer).

== See also ==
- Expulsion of Poles by Germany
- The Holocaust
- Kidnapping of Polish children by Nazi Germany
- Nazi crimes against ethnic Poles
- The Portraitist
