= Wólka Złojecka =

- Village
- Location within Poland
- Coordinates: 50°48′N 23°8′E
- Country: Poland
- Voivodeship: Lublin
- County: Zamość
- Gmina: Nielisz

Wólka Złojecka [ˈvulka zwɔˈjɛt͡ska] is a village in the administrative district of Gmina Nielisz, within Zamość County, Lublin Voivodeship, in eastern Poland.
